= California Historical Landmarks in Nevada County =

List table of the properties and districts listed as California Historical Landmarks within Nevada County, Northern California.

- Note: Click the "Map of all coordinates" link to the right to view a Google map of all properties and districts with latitude and longitude coordinates in the table below.

== Listings ==
Image		Landmark name	Location	City or town	Summary
Alpha Hydraulic Diggings	628	Alpha Hydraulic Diggings	Omega Rest Area; 39°20′08″N 120°47′14″W	Washington	
Bridgeport Covered Bridge	390	Bridgeport Covered Bridge	Pleasant Valley Rd. and Yuba River; 39°17′34″N 121°11′42″W	French Corral	
Discovery of Gold at Gold Hill	297	Discovery of Gold at Gold Hill	Jenkins St. & Hocking Ave. 39°12′47″N 121°04′09″W	Grass Valley	
Donner Monument	134	Donner Monument	Donner Memorial State Park; 39°19′12″N 120°14′30″W	Truckee	
Empire Mine	298	Empire Mine	Empire Mine State Historic Park; 39°12′13″N 121°02′34″W	Grass Valley	
First Manufacturing Site of the Pelton Wheel	1012	First Manufacturing Site of the Pelton Wheel	325 Spring St. 39°15′44″N 121°01′11″W	Nevada City	
First Transcontinental Railroad-Truckee	780	First Transcontinental Railroad-Truckee	70 Donner Pass Rd. 39°19′39″N 120°11′07″W	Truckee	
Holbrooke Hotel	914	Holbrooke Hotel	212 W. Main St. 39°13′08″N 121°03′48″W	Grass Valley	
Home of Lola Montez	292	Home of Lola Montez	248 Mill St. 39°13′00″N 121°03′50″W	Grass Valley	
Home of Lotta Crabtree	293	Home of Lotta Crabtree	238 Mill St. 39°13′00″N 121°03′50″W	Grass Valley	
Mount Saint Mary's Convent and Academy	855	Mount Saint Mary's Convent and Academy	Church St. between Chapel and Dalton Sts. 39°12′53″N 121°04′03″W	Grass Valley	
National Exchange Hotel	899	National Exchange Hotel	211 Broad St. 39°15′45″N 121°01′01″W	Nevada City	
Nevada Theatre	863	Nevada Theatre	401 Broad Street; 39°15′47″N 121°01′09″W	Nevada City	
North Bloomfield Mining and Gravel Company	852	North Bloomfield Mining and Gravel Company	Malakoff Diggins State Historic Park; 39°22′07″N 120°54′49″W		
North Star Mine Powerhouse	843	North Star Mine Powerhouse	Mining and Pelton Wheel Museum; 39°12′31″N 121°04′11″W	Grass Valley	
Omega Hydraulic Diggings	629	Omega Hydraulic Diggings	Omega Rest Area; 39°20′00″N 120°44′54″W	Washington	
Overland Emigrant Trail	799	Overland Emigrant Trail	Wolf Creek Bridge; 39°03′43″N 121°05′19″W	Grass Valley	
Rough and Ready	294	Rough and Ready	State Hwy 20 and Mountain Rose Rd. 39°13′49″N 121°08′06″W	Rough and Ready	
South Yuba Canal Office	832	South Yuba Canal Office	134 Main St. 39°15′47″N 121°01′01″W	Nevada City	
World's first long-distance telephone line	247	World's first long-distance telephone line	Pleasant Valley Rd. 39°18′24″N 121°09′46″W	French Corral	

== See also ==
- National Register of Historic Places listings in Nevada County, California
- History of Nevada County, California
- List of California Historical Landmarks
