= Omega, California =

Omega
- Former settlement
- Location in California
- Coordinates: 39°20′00″N 120°44′58″W
- Country: United States
- State: California
- County: Nevada County
- Elevation: 4,304 ft (1,312 m)

Population (1880)
  - Total: 50
- Time zone: UTC-8 (Pacific (PST))
  - Summer (DST): UTC-7 (PDT)

Omega (originally, Delerium Tremens) was a former settlement in Nevada County, California, United States, first populated in 1850 by a single miner, J.A. Dixon, working a claim during the California Gold Rush. The town was located 3.25 miles (5.2 km) east-southeast of the present-day unincorporated town of Washington, California. A sister town, Alpha, located at what is now the site of the historical Omega Hydraulic Diggings, was about 1 mi (1.6 km) north of Omega. In the mid 1850s, following the introduction of hydraulic mining operations nearby, the town prospered. Omega had a post office (which operated from 1857 to 1891), and needed to convert a residence into a jail in late 1858.
