= Omega Hydraulic Diggings =

- Location within California
- 39.333°N 120.748°W
- Location: Omega Rest Area, California State Route 20 (P.M. 35. 7), 6 miles east of Washington Road; Washington, California

California Historical Landmark
- Designated: 1958-01-29
- Reference no.: 629

The Omega Hydraulic Diggings are located 1 mile (1.6 km) north of what was the town of Omega, California during the California Gold Rush. The site is southeast of the unincorporated town of Washington, California. From SR 20, the diggings are reachable via the gravel Omega Road which merges with Forest Route 29 in small sections.

The hydraulic diggings became a registered California Historical Landmark (No. 629) on January 1, 1958. The plaque's inscription reads:

ALPHA AND OMEGA

One mile north of here were the towns of Alpha and Omega, named by gold miners in the early 1850s. The tremendous hydraulic diggings, visible from near this point, engulfed most of the original townsites. Alpha was the birthplace of famed opera singer Emma Nevada. Mining at Omega continued until 1949, and lumbering operations are carried on there today (1958).

California Registered Historical Landmarks Nos. 628-629

== See also ==
- Alpha Hydraulic Diggings
- California Historical Landmarks in Nevada County
