= Nevada City City Hall =

City Hall in Nevada City, California

- U.S. Historic district – Contributing property
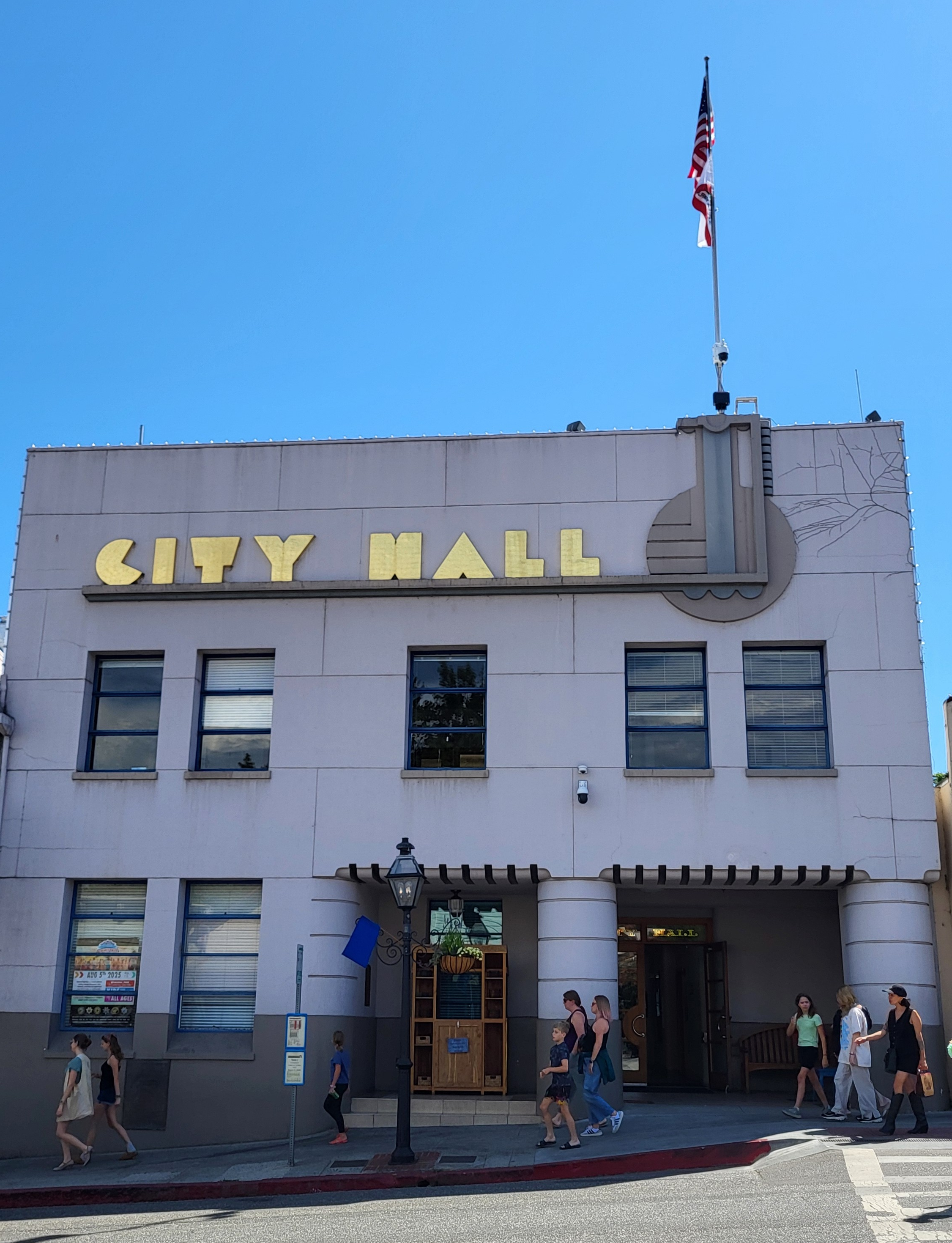
- The building in 2025

- Location within California
- Location: 317 Broad St, Nevada City, California
- Coordinates: 39.2629°N 121.0196°W
- Built: 1937
- Architect: George C. Sellon
- Architectural style: Art Moderne
- Part of: Nevada City Downtown Historic District (ID85002520)
- Designated CP: September 23, 1985

Nevada City City Hall is the city hall for Nevada City, California.

== History ==
Nevada City's previous city hall was built in 1878 and demolished to make way for the current city hall in 1935.

Nevada City City Hall was designed by George C. Sellon, the architect also responsible for the nearby Nevada County Superior Courthouse. It was built as part of the Works Progress Administration in 1937. Congressman and Nevada City native Harry Englebright helped secure funding for the new building.

The building was listed as a contributing property in the Nevada City Downtown Historic District in 1985. The listing states that the building has "exceptional value for its architectural styling and its role as City Hall."

In 1992, the city planned a $854,000 ($1.96 million in 2025) remodel for the building but could not raise the necessary funds. In 1998, the building was deemed inadequate in both serving the needs of the community and providing an efficient environment for city employees to work.

== Architecture and design ==
Nevada City City Hall is a two-story building built with reinforced concrete. It features an Art Moderne design that includes emphatic horizontal lines, smooth surfaces, and large rounded pillars that frame the entrance to the fire department garage on the ground floor.
