= Powell House (California) =

Historic building in Nevada City, California

- U.S. Historic district – Contributing property
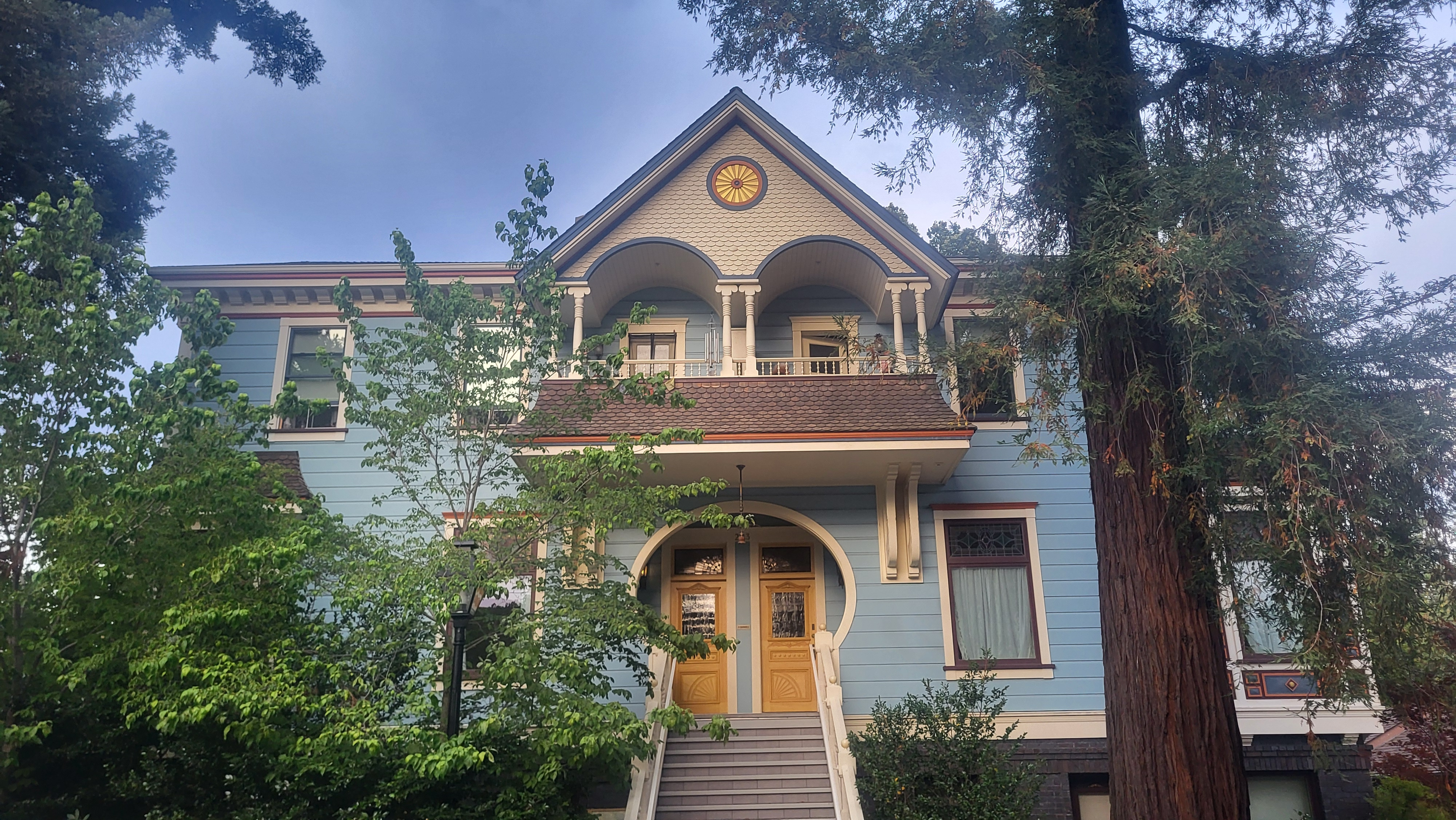
- The building in 2025

- Location within California
- Location: 203 S. Pine St, Nevada City, California
- Coordinates: 39.2621°N 121.0188°W
- Built: 1855 or 1860
- Part of: Nevada City Downtown Historic District (ID85002520)
- Designated CP: September 23, 1985

Powell House, formerly Nevada City Baptist Church, is a historic residence and former church in Nevada City, California.

== History ==
Powell House, originally Nevada City Baptist Church, was built as a one-story frame structure in 1855 or 1860. It was not damaged during the Nevada City fire of 1863, the city's last citywide fire, and provided facilities for the other congregations that did sustain losses.

Emma Nevada made her singing debut in the church either at age three in 1862/63 or age five in 1864/65.

E. T. R. Powell, operator of Nevada City Soda Works, bought the building in 1886 and enlarged it significantly. He also divided the building into two living quarters, divided the congregation room into sixteen rooms, and manufactured soda in the ground-floor basement.

The building was later bought by Charles Woods and David Osborn, founders of the nearby American Victorian Museum, who used this building as a residence and boarding house. They later converted the building into a "teddy bear castle" with 3,000 teddy bears on display.

The building was listed as a contributing property in the Nevada City Downtown Historic District in 1985.

Powell House was bought for $730,000 in 2006 ($1.17 million in 2025) and reopened in 2011 as a five-unit apartment complex. The building had previously been converted to a ten-room hotel.

== Architecture and design ==
Powell House was originally a one-story frame that featured a tall steeple over a gable. The building was later expanded to two-stories.

The building's entrance is elevated, framed by an archway, topped by a transom, and features two doors carved in their lower panel with a glass panel above. The second story features a balustraded balcony on top of heavy double brackets, above which a gabled shingled roof is supported by two arches, the arches supported by ornamental posts.

The building features single glass pane windows with original 1860 stained glass panels above.
