= Nevada Theatre =

- U.S. National Register of Historic Places
- U.S. Historic district – Contributing property
- California Historical Landmark
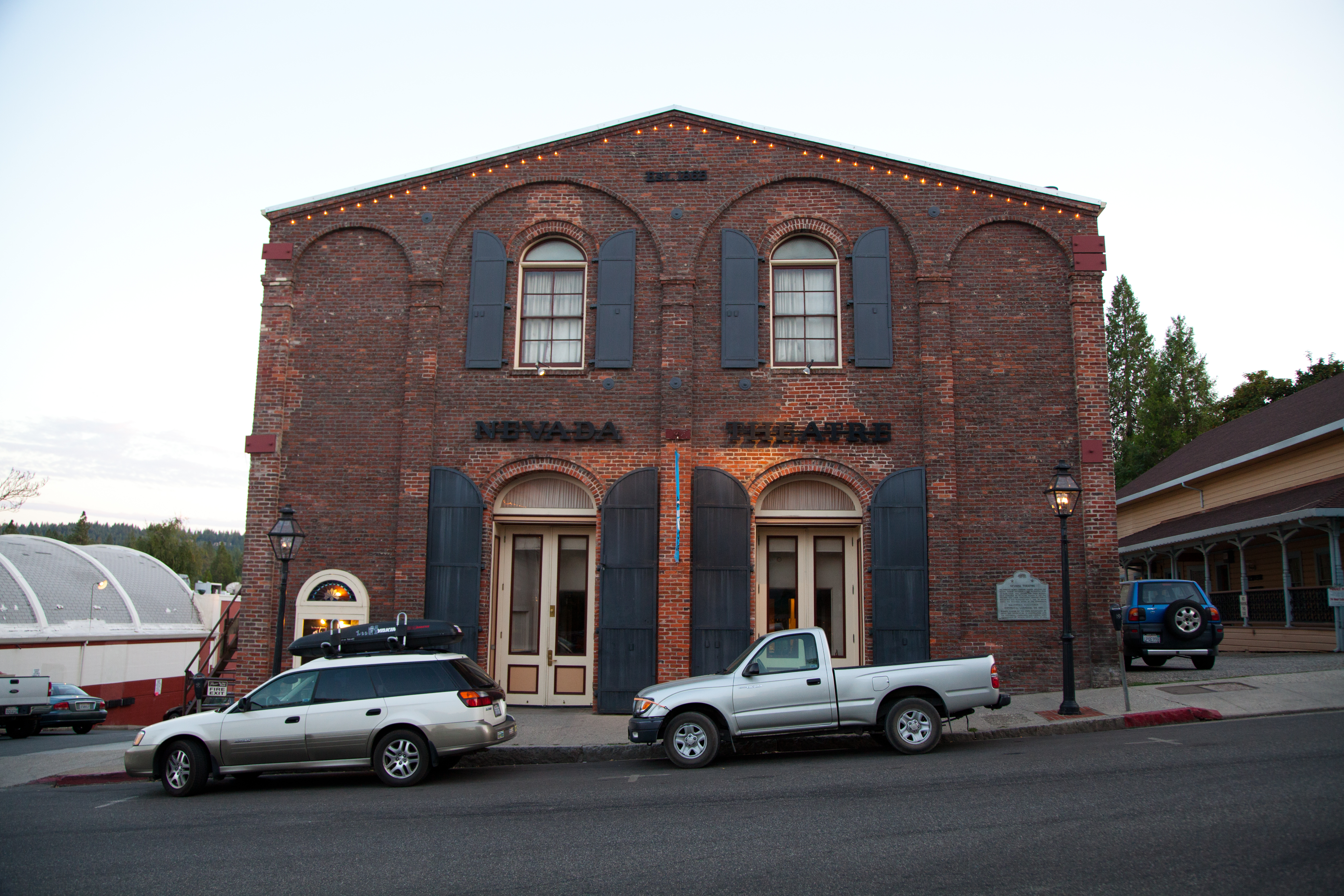

- Location within California Location within the United States
- Location: 401 Broad Street, Nevada City, California
- Coordinates: 39°15′47″N 121°1′9″W
- Built: 1865
- Part of: Nevada City Downtown Historic District (ID85002520)
- NRHP reference No.: 73000417
- CHISL No.: 863

Significant dates
- Added to NRHP: March 14, 1973
- Designated CP: September 23, 1985
- Designated CHISL: September 13, 1973

The Nevada Theatre, also known as the Cedar Theatre, located in downtown Nevada City, California, is California's oldest existing theater building. Its principal periods of significance were 1850–1874, 1875–1899, 1900–1924, and 1925–1949. It is situated on ancestral Nisenan land.

== History ==
After the three-story Bailey House Hotel, at Broad and Bridge Streets, burned down in 1863, the Nevada Theatre Association began fundraising for a new building. Stock was sold at $100 a share, and a ball was held June 1865 to cover the remaining costs for the rustic vernacular Victorian building. The building's architect, builder, and engineer are unknown. When the theater opened on September 9, 1865, the first performance was the John Poole two-act comedy entitled The Dutch Governor, or 'Twould Puzzle a Conjurer.

Silent films were screened as early as 1908, and the theater underwent a remodel in 1909, retrofitted as a movie house. A slanted floor and electric lights were added in 1915. By 1957, it closed because of a sluggish economy, but it was later purchased through public donations and reopened in 1968.

== Building ==
With over 200 seats, including balcony seating, the theater is in use year round for both live performance and movies. It is wheelchair accessible.

The backstage area is located under the stage and is painted baby blue. It includes a small room with makeup mirrors.

== Mural ==
During the COVID-19 closure, the theatre was painted with an original mural spanning the entire auditorium by local artist Sarah Coleman, with Brianna French and Miles Toland. Coleman explained much of the symbolism in a short film called A VISION OF HERE (2022). The artists were awarded the Dr. Leland and Sally Lewis Award for Visual Arts for the mural.

== Performers ==
Notable past performers include Lotta Crabtree, Mötley Crüe, Jack London, Emma Nevada, Mark Twain, and The Second City comedy troupe.

Present day main users include:

- LeGacy Productions
- Nevada Theatre Film Series
- Sierra Stages
- Community Asian Theatre of the Sierra
- Wild & Scenic Environmental Film Festival

== Commissions ==
The Nevada County Liberal Arts Commission was formed in the 1960s to purchase the building from United Artists. The Nevada Theatre Commission, a 501(c)(3) nonprofit corporation, followed the first commission and, with a Board of Directors, is the governing body of the Nevada Theatre. It owns, operates, restores, and uses the theater "To preserve and develop the historic Nevada Theatre and its other historic properties in order to provide the community with an accessible, usable and valuable cultural asset" (Mission Statement).

== Landmark ==
In 1968, the theater was included by the city of Nevada City in its historic district, where it was mentioned as an example of a building that has "great historical interest and esthetic value", contains "important historical exhibits and unique architectural specimens", and is "symbolic of the City's historical past."

The theater is registered as California Historical Landmark No. 863, and was listed in the National Register of Historic Places on March 14, 1973. The landmark plaque reads:

California's oldest existing theatre building, the Nevada, opened September 9, 1865. Celebrities such as Mark Twain, Jack London, and Emma Nevada have appeared on its stage. Closed in 1957, the theatre was later purchased through public donations and reopened May 7, 1968 to again serve the cultural needs of the community.
California Registered Historical Landmark No. 863.

Plaque placed by the State Department of Parks and Recreation in cooperation with the Historical Landmarks and Liberal Arts Commissions of Nevada County, April 27, 1974.

== See also ==
- National Register of Historic Places listings in Nevada County, California
- California Historical Landmarks in Nevada County
