= Doris Foley Library for Historical Research =

- Nevada City Free Public Library
- U.S. National Register of Historic Places
- U.S. Historic district – Contributing property
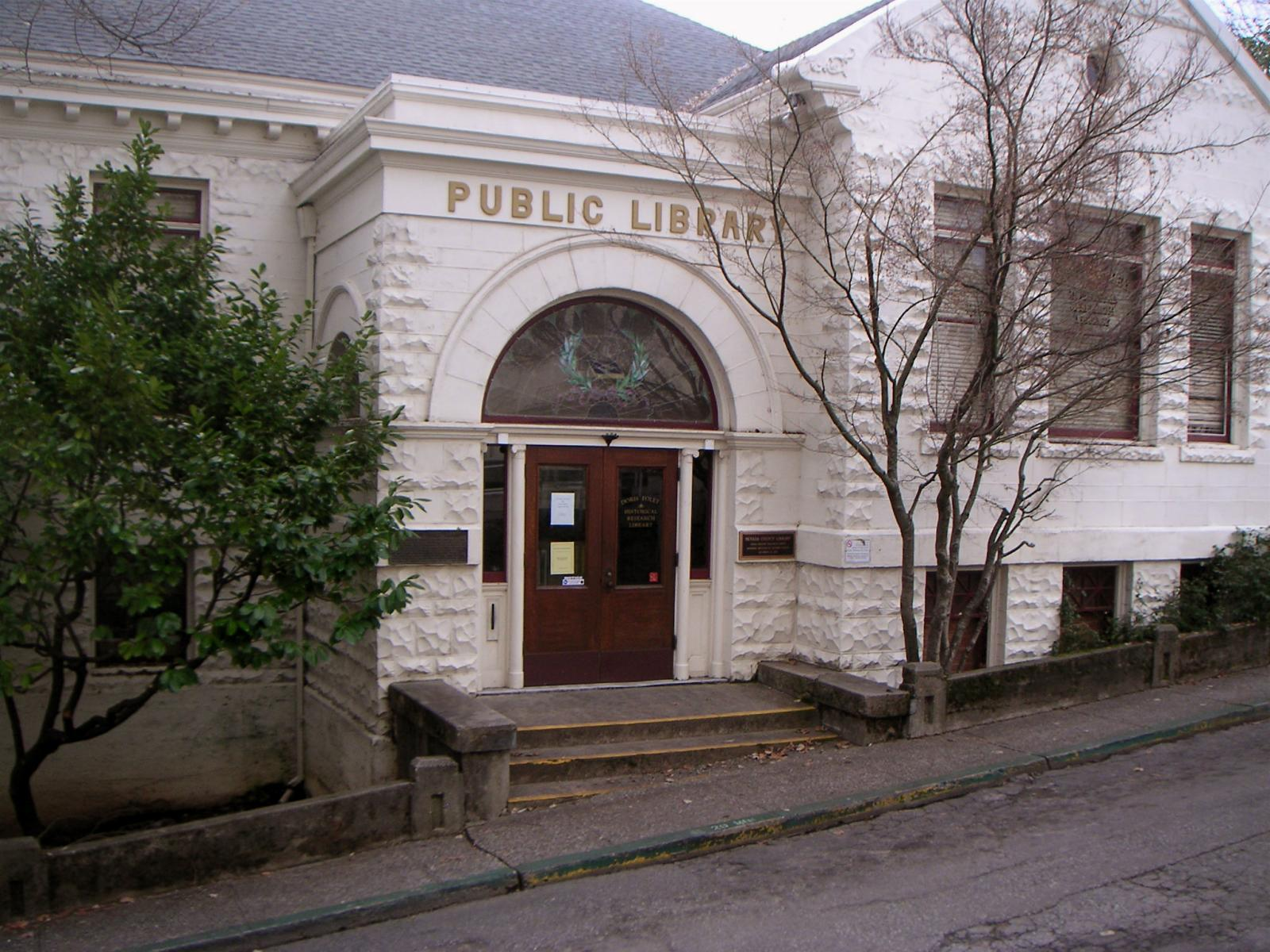
- Library in 2010

- Location within California Location within the United States
- Location: 211 N. Pine St., Nevada City, California
- Coordinates: 39°15′52″N 121°0′59″W
- Built: 1907
- Architect: William H. Weeks
- Architectural style: Romanesque Revival
- Part of: Nevada City Downtown Historic District (ID85002520)
- MPS: California Carnegie Libraries MPS
- NRHP reference No.: 90001809

Significant dates
- Added to NRHP: December 10, 1990
- Designated CP: September 23, 1985

The Doris Foley Library for Historical Research (formerly, Nevada City Free Public Library and Nevada City Library; colloquially: Carnegie Library or Foley) is a reference and research library in Nevada City, in Nevada County, California. Built in 1907, the Romanesque Revival style building is currently a branch of the Nevada County Library System.

== History ==
With beginnings as an 1849 mining town, Nevada City had a reading room as early as 1850. Becoming a settlement, it boasted a library association in less than a decade, followed by a YMCA reading room and library in 1869. Ownership of an Odd Fellows Library that was established 1874, was transferred to the city in 1902, and the library was moved to the Corcoran Building next to the historic Nevada Theatre.

The women of Nevada City urged the library trustees to seek Carnegie funds, and, in 1904, the trustees received a grant for $10,000. Bids were opened the following year, and the estimated completion date of a new library was 1906. As the library committee believed it might receive an additional $5,000 from Carnegie, plans were made for a more elaborate building, but on October 13, 1905, the trustees were notified there would be no additional funding, necessitating changes to the plans. William H. Weeks was the architect, while Watsonville's W.J. Wilkerson of Graniterock was the builder. Organized as the Civic Improvement Club, the city's women were the landscape planners. Furnishings cost $1,000. The library was dedicated on October 4, 1907.

Miss Annie James was the librarian in 1919. By 1923, the Nevada City Free Library had 1,782 volumes, increasing to 7,555 volumes by 1927, when Iva Williamson was the librarian.

=== Landmark ===
The library was listed in the National Register of Historic Places as a contributing property in the Nevada City Downtown Historic District in 1985. It was also individually listed in 1990.

== Architecture ==
The building was designed in a Romanesque Revival architectural style by Weeks, the architect of several other Northern California Carnegie libraries. The seven room, single story plus basement building was constructed by Wilkerson using dark gray man-made stone, plus both rough and smooth concrete blocks, fabricated on location. It features a dark brick facade, now painted white, and a partially exposed cement foundation. A cement stairway leads from the road to the arched doorways.

Two arched windows are situated in the foyer, the side one being smaller, and the larger front one being of stained glass depicting the lamp of knowledge. There are numerous other windows, rectangular in shape.

The interior has not changed much in layout. It includes a black and white checkered floor.

== Library ==
=== Gold Rush reference library ===
After the Madelyn Helling Library was built in the Nevada County's Rood Administrative Center in the late 1990s, the Carnegie library became a research and reference library for local history and the California Gold Rush. On May 17, 1997, it was renamed the Doris Foley Library for Historical Research in honor of local teacher, historian and writer, Doris Foley, the wife of a gold-mining engineer.

==== Signage ====
There are several signs and plaques on the outside of the building noting the library's various names:

- "Public Library": large, block letters above the front door; part of the original design.
- "Doris Foley Library for Historical Research": lettering on the glass of the front door.
- "Nevada County Library, Local History Research Center, National Register of Historic Places, December 10, 1990": plaque to the right of the front door
- "Nevada City Public Library": plaque to the left of the front door. In total, it states: Library Association formed December 19, 1857. First library was in Kidd-Knox Bldg. 228 Broad St. It was moved to Oustomah Lodge I.O.O.F. No. 16, June 3, 1874. Nevada City Trustees assumed responsibilities Oct. 1, 1902 and was moved into the Corcoran Bldg. next to the Nevada Theatre. The Carnegie Endowment was given to the city in 1904. The present library was dedicated Oct. 4, 1907. City groups raised funds for furnishings and beautified grounds 1911.

=== Materials ===
Book capacity is 8,000, and the current automation system is Horizon. There are maps and records dating back to 1856, a Genealogy Room and an Assessor's Books area.

In October 2003, the library received the Arthur Cecil Todd Cornish Studies Collection, named in honor of Dr. Todd, author of The Cornish Miner in America: The Contribution to the Mining History of the United States by Emigrant Cornish Miners--The Men Called Cousin Jacks.

==== Friends of the Library ====
Though the Foley was in jeopardy of closing in July 2009 because of county budget cuts, financial support from the Friends of the Library allows it to remain open to the public Thursday, Friday and Saturday 10am-4pm.

== See also ==
- National Register of Historic Places listings in Nevada County, California
