= Miners Foundry =

- First Manufacturing Site of the Pelton Wheel
- U.S. Historic district – Contributing property
- California Historical Landmark
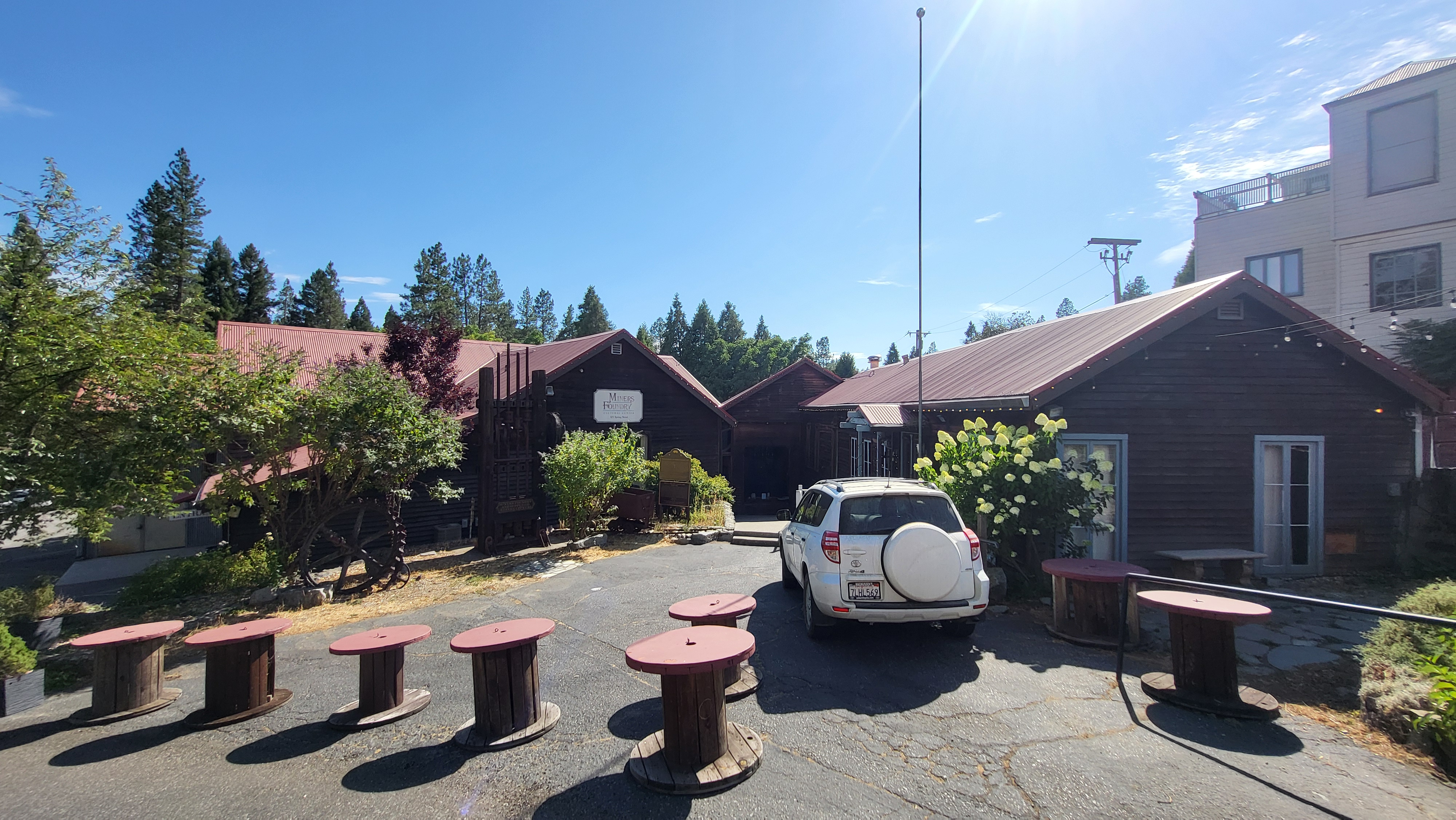
- The foundry in 2025

- Location within California
- Location: 325 Spring Street; Nevada City, California, USA
- Coordinates: 39°15′44″N 121°1′11″W
- Built: 1856
- Part of: Nevada City Downtown Historic District (ID85002520)
- CHISL No.: 1012

Significant dates
- Designated CP: September 23, 1985
- Designated CHISL: May 11, 1994

The Miners Foundry (previously Nevada Foundry; Nevada Iron Foundry and Machine Shop, George Allan's Foundry and Machine Works, American Victorian Museum, Miners Foundry and Supply Company; currently Miners Foundry Cultural Center) is located at 325 Spring Street, Nevada City, California, USA. Built in Nevada County in 1856, it is a California Historical Landmark as, in 1879, the foundry became the first manufacturing site of the Pelton wheel.

== History ==
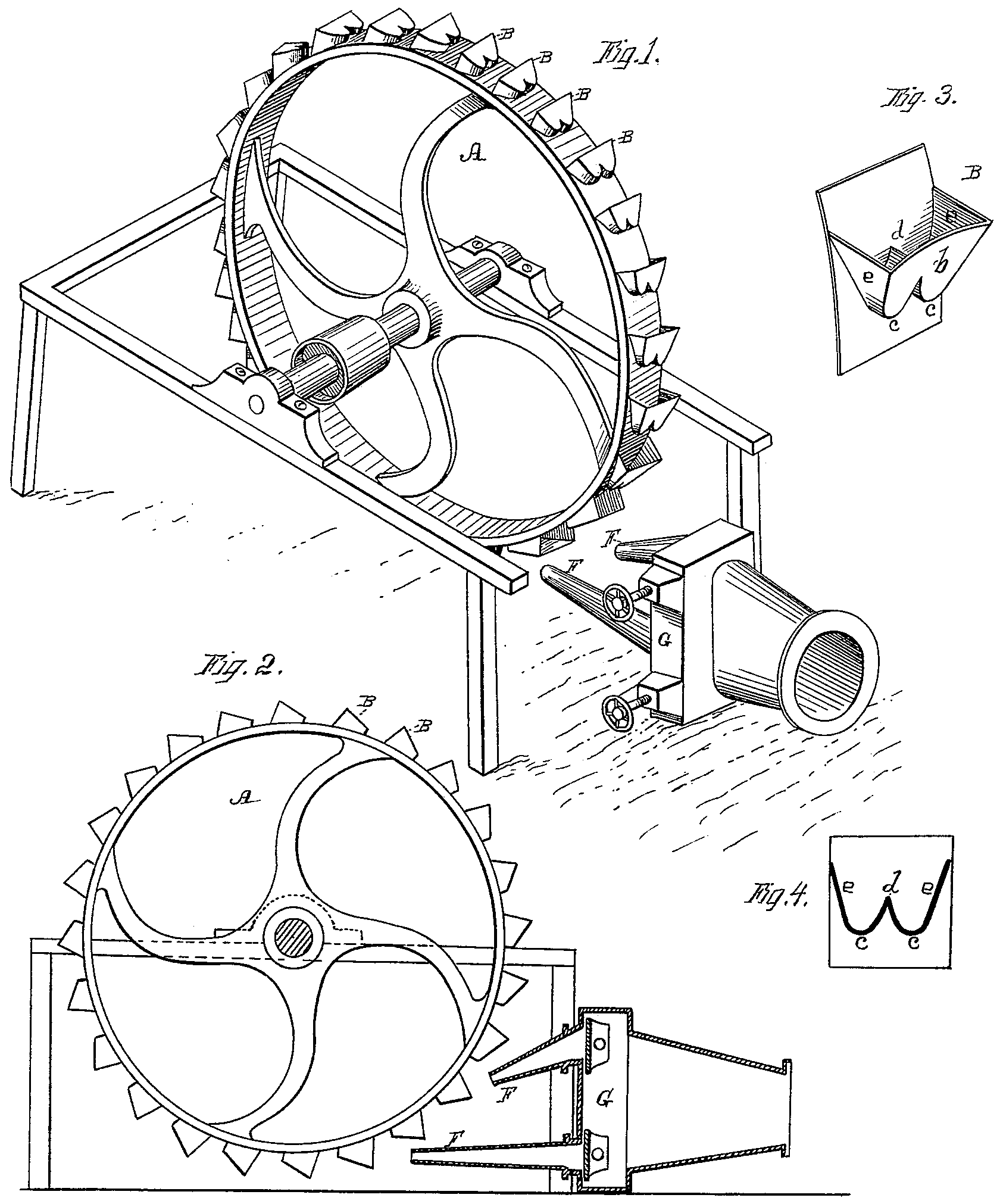
Figure from Pelton's original patent (October 1880)

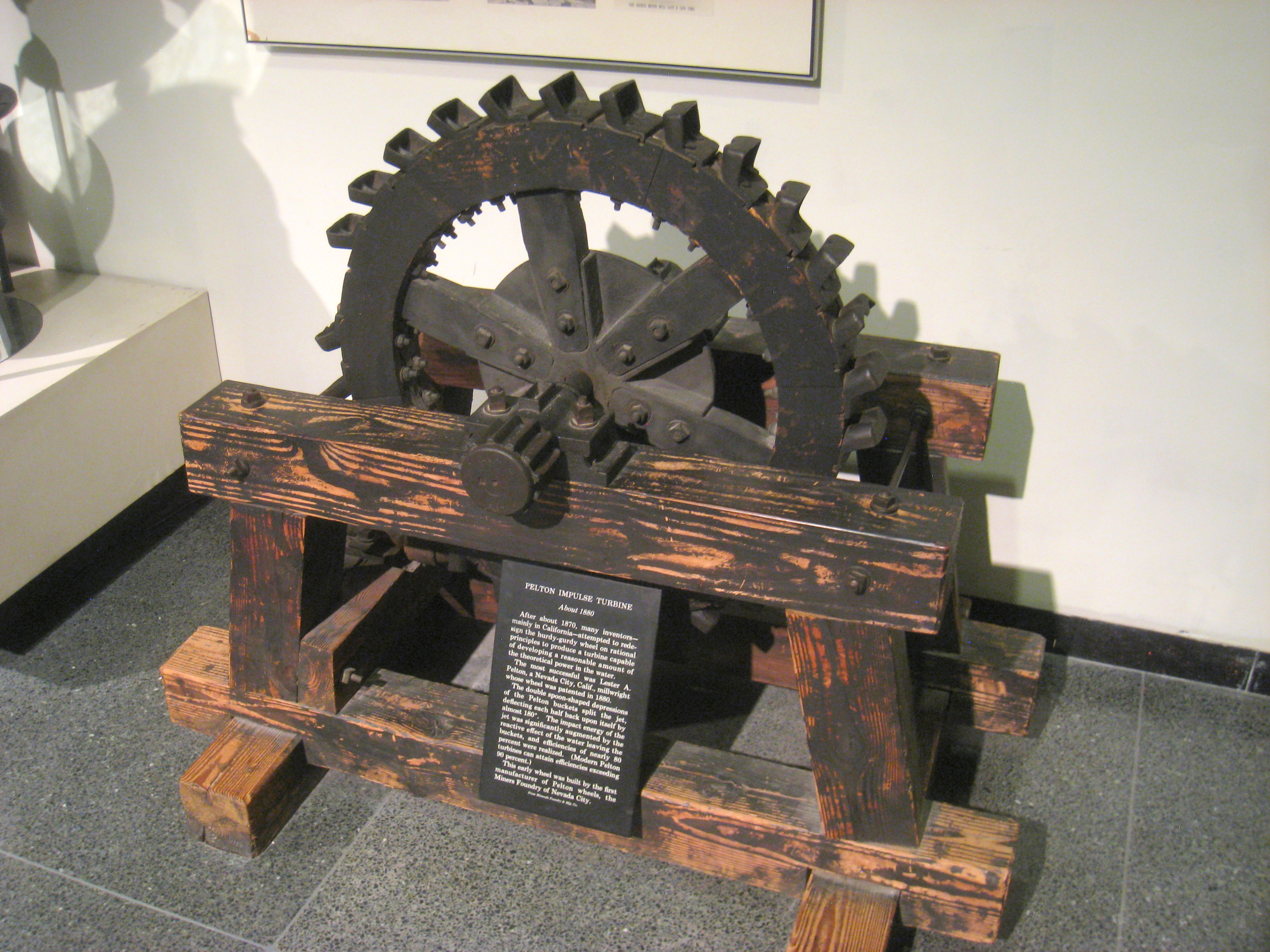
Pelton wheel, circa 1880, built by the Miners Foundry

Edward Coker started the Nevada Iron Foundry and Machine Shop in 1855. The ironworks foundry and blacksmith shop was situated in a rented building on Spring Street behind the National Exchange Hotel. The Nevada Foundry was built to serve the needs of loggers and California Gold Rush miners who were working mines in the Sierra Nevada foothills. Nevada City's fire of July 1856 destroyed the small foundry operated by Coker. Afterwards, he acquired a new site on the corner of Bridge and Spring streets and began construction on a new building, constructed of native timber and stone. In 1857, the Nevada Foundry had built its first entire steam engine. But before the new building was completed, Coker lost interest in the business and sold the machinery to David Thom, Thomas J. Williams and J. Jones. By 1859, Jones was no longer associated with the business, and Williams had sold out to William Heugh, leaving William Heugh and David Thom as proprietors of the Nevada Iron and Brass Foundry and Machine Shop. In 1866, they employed approximately 22 men. In the following year, the largest casting made at their foundry was the mortar of a quartz mill weighing 5,600 pounds, and thought to be the heaviest mortar in the state of California.

Heugh died in 1867 and his business interests were acquired by George Grant Allan who became a partner of David Thom, though Allan's ownership was not established until 1871. Their foundry fabricated mining equipment, stamp mills, and mining tools. By 1868, it employed approximately 150 men. There were machine shops and boiler works. The works, driven by a 60 horse power steam engine, consumed 1800 tons of pig iron, 300 tons of wrought iron, and 700 tons of coal. In one month of 1872, the North Bloomfield Mining and Gravel Company made a $30,000 purchase.

=== Pelton wheel ===
In 1876, Allan bought out Thom and changed the business name to George Allan's Foundry and Machine Works. It was during Allan's ownership of the foundry that Lester Allan Pelton of Camptonville invented a new type of water wheel in the late 1870s. He brought it to Allan's foundry, where he and Allan tested it before manufacturing the first Pelton wheel. When the foundry could not keep up with Pelton wheel orders, production for the Pelton wheel was moved to San Francisco, though limited production of it continued at Allan's foundry. In 1892, Allan brought his son, Albert D. Allan, into the business as his partner and the younger Allan became the successor sole proprietor.

William H. Martin also owned a foundry higher up on Spring Street, at Bennett Street. In 1906, W.H. Martin, W.R. Martin, Miss May C. Martin, B.J. Hall, and J.G. O'Neill incorporated the Miners Foundry Co. W.H. Martin purchased Allan's Foundry from the estate in 1907 and renamed it Miners Foundry and Supply Co. He was the sole proprietor until 1921 when, in that year, he transferred ownership to his son-in-law, Richard Goyne. Under Goyne, times changed and the foundry began fabricated steel. It built mining tools, equipment, and vehicles, such as the side-dump ore car, ball mill, and scoop feed. It also built non-mining commercial vehicles. In 1947, it diversified. A new division began selling welding supplies, legging supplies, rubber products, and Bethlehem Steel wire rope while another division began producing a centrifugal juicer

Ray Amick owned the foundry from 1965 until 1974 when manufacturing in the foundry ended. In 1972, the building was purchased by the American Victorian Museum and two years later, it was converted into a non-profit cultural center that is used by 50,000 people each year.

== Landmark ==
For over 110 years, the building was continuously used as a foundry. A California Historical Landmark plaque, No. 1012, and dated May 11, 1994, was added to the site in honor of the Pelton wheel's history associated with the foundry. In 1986, the Nevada City Constitutional Commission and E Clampus Vitus added another marker.

On July 29, 2011, rock band Red Hot Chili Peppers played an invitation-only show at the Miners Foundry Cultural Center.

The Nevada City Winery, the first bonded winery to open in Nevada County following Prohibition in the United States, is located in the Miners Foundry Garage.

== See also ==
- Omega Hydraulic Diggings
- California Historical Landmarks in Nevada County
