= Nevada City Downtown Historic District =

Historic district in California, United States

- U.S. National Register of Historic Places
- U.S. Historic district
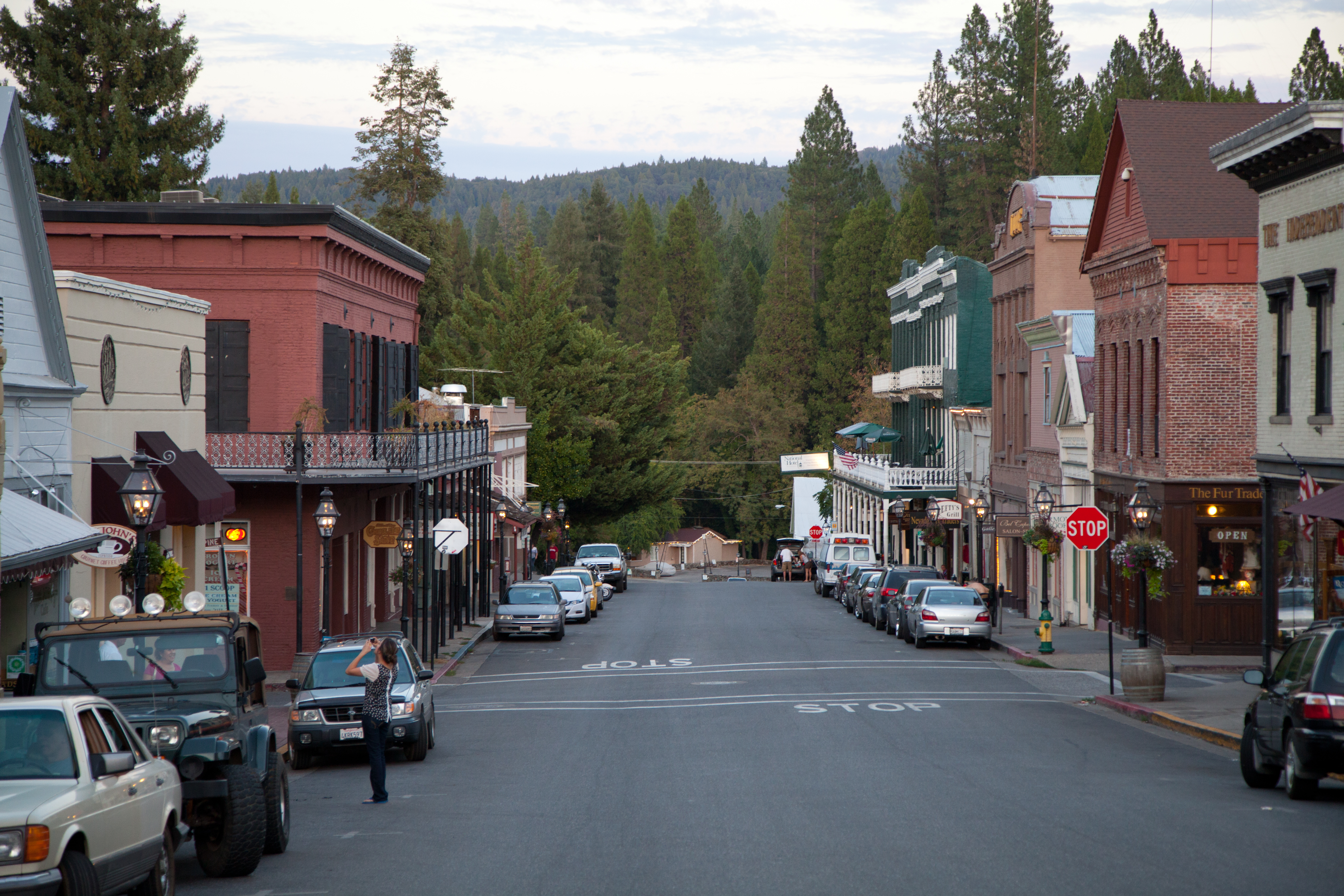
- Broad Street through the district in 2012

- Location within California
- Location: Nevada City, California
- Area: 16 acres (6.5 ha)
- Built: 1856–1917, 1937
- Architect: Multiple
- NRHP reference No.: 85002520
- Added to NRHP: September 23, 1985

The Nevada City Downtown Historic District is a 16-acre (6.5 ha) historic district in Nevada City within the U.S. state of California. Located in Nevada County, it was listed on the National Register of Historic Places in 1985. The period of significance is 1856–1917. The historic district covers the downtown section roughly bounded by Spring, Bridge, Commercial, York, Washington, Coyote, and Main Streets. It includes 70 contributing buildings, several of which have been separately listed on the National Register and as California Historical Landmarks.

== NRHP contributing properties ==
The following buildings are listed in the National Register of Historic Places as contributing properties in the Nevada City Downtown Historic District:

National Register of Historic Places contributing properties

Listed Name	Alternate Name	Image	Address	Type	Style	Architect	Year built	Additional information
National Hotel	National Exchange Hotel, Bicknell Block		211 Broad St.	Hospitality	Brick masonry		1856	CHL No. 899, NRHP No. 73000416
Alpha Hardware			210 Broad St.	Commercial			1917	
Dickerman's Drugs			219 Broad St.	Commercial	Vernacular		1856	
Citizen's Pizza (Citizen's Bank Building)			221 Broad St.	Commercial	Classical		pre-1859	
I.O.O.F. Hall			225 Broad St.	Fraternal hall		William Bettis	1873	
Lowell's Jewelry		Right: 218 Broad; Center: 220 Broad; Left: 222 Broad	218 Broad St.	Commercial, residential			1864	
Family Barber Shop		Right: 218 Broad; Center: 220 Broad; Left: 222 Broad	220 Broad St.				1864	
Mine Shaft		Right: 218 Broad; Center: 220 Broad; Left: 222 Broad	222 Broad St.				1864	
M'Lady's		Far left: 227 Broad; Left: 231 Broad; Center/right: 233 Broad	227 Broad St.				1868	
Fur Trader No. 2		Far left: 227 Broad; Left: 231 Broad; Center/right: 233 Broad	231 Broad St.		Italian Renaissance Revival, Victorian		1865	
Eddy's (Schrieber's Corner)	Flagg Building	Far left: 227 Broad; Left: 231 Broad; Center/right: 233 Broad	233 Broad St.	Hospitality	Italian Renaissance Revival		1856	
Kidd, Knox Building	Brown and Morgan Block, Durbrow Building, Freeman Building, Baker-Tintle Building		228 – 236 Broad St.	Office, commercial	Brick masonry		1856	
Union Building	Independent Building		301 Broad St.			Mr. Burlington (1854), C. E. Wilson (1904)	1854, 1904	
Hartung Building			306 Broad St.				1864	These addresses are listed separately even though they are the same building
Hartung Building			308 and 308 ½ Broad St.				1864	These addresses are listed separately even though they are the same building
Prospector's Furniture		Far left: 303 Broad; Left: 305 Broad; Right: 307 Broad; Far right: 309 Broad	303 Broad St.				1856	
Novaks		Far left: 303 Broad; Left: 305 Broad; Right: 307 Broad; Far right: 309 Broad	305 Broad St.				pre-1869	
Apple Faire		Far left: 303 Broad; Left: 305 Broad; Right: 307 Broad; Far right: 309 Broad	307 Broad St.	Office			1895	
Cirino's		Far left: 303 Broad; Left: 305 Broad; Right: 307 Broad; Far right: 309 Broad	309 Broad St.				c. 1890	
Utopian Stone		Right: 310 Broad; Left: 312 Broad	310 – 310 ½ Broad St.	Commercial, office	Victorian remodel c. 1900		1863	
Merril's Real Estate		Right: 310 Broad; Left: 312 Broad	312 – 312 ½ Broad St.			Oscar Brown	1913	
Antique Emporium		Left: 313 Broad; Right: 315 Broad	313 Broad St.				c. 1879	
McGee's		Left: 313 Broad; Right: 315 Broad	315 Broad St.	Food service, residential			c. 1880	
City Hall			317 Broad St.	Government	Art Moderne	George C. Sellon	1937	
Posh–Nosh	Nugget Building		318 Broad St.				c. 1881	
Selay's			320 Broad St.		Vernacular		c. 1880	
New York Hotel			408 Broad St.	Hospitality		George M. Hughes (contractor)	1880	
Nevada Theater	The Cedar Theatre		401 Broad St.	Theater		George Pierce (builder)	1865	CHL No. 863, NRHP No. 73000417
Darlene Crovley Residence		Right: 414 Broad; Center: 416 Broad; Left: 418 Broad	414 Broad St.	Residential			1880	
Nevada City Engineering Co.		Right: 414 Broad; Center: 416 Broad; Left: 418 Broad	416 Broad St.			L. N. Nihell	1881	
Antiques/American Art		Right: 414 Broad; Center: 416 Broad; Left: 418 Broad	418 Broad St.	Commercial, residential		L. N. Nihell	1881	
Pennsylvania Engine Co. No. 2	Nevada City Firehouse No. 2		420 Broad St.	Fire station	Classical Revival	Kent and Mackay	1861	NRHP No. 74000544
Love Your Feet			228 Commercial St.				pre-1885	
Chief Crazy Horse			230 Commercial St.				c. 1863	
Sitting Bull Leather			232 Commercial St.	Commercial, residential			c. 1863	
Gray Goose			234 – 234 ½ Commercial St.				c. 1863	
Transcript Building			244 Commercial St.				c. 1862	
Osborn and Woods			244 Commercial St.				c. 1863	
Royal Gardens			300 Commercial St.				1861	
Vacant Building		Far left: 309 Comm. 2nd left: 311 Comm. 2nd right: 313 Comm. Far right: 315 Comm.	309 Commercial St.				1890s	
Vacant Building		Far left: 309 Comm. 2nd left: 311 Comm. 2nd right: 313 Comm. Far right: 315 Comm.	311 Commercial St.				1881	
Vacant Building		Far left: 309 Comm. 2nd left: 311 Comm. 2nd right: 313 Comm. Far right: 315 Comm.	313 Commercial St.				1881	
Vacant Building		Far left: 309 Comm. 2nd left: 311 Comm. 2nd right: 313 Comm. Far right: 315 Comm.	315 Commercial St.				1880	
The Gallery	Old Chinese Laundry	Right: 312 Comm. Left: 316 Comm.	312 Commercial St.	Commercial, residential			1884	
Sierra Mountain Coffees		Right: 312 Comm. Left: 316 Comm.	316 Commercial St.				1896	
Victorian Christmas (Ott Assay Office)		Right: 30 Main; Left: 132 Main	30 Main St.	Commercial			1855	County Historical Registered Landmark No. 1
Chamber of Commerce (South Yuba Canal Building)	Potter Building	Right: 30 Main; Left: 132 Main	132 Main St.	Commercial then office			1855	CHL No. 832
Westamerica Bank			206 – 208 Main St.	Commercial, residential			c. 1864	
Shaw's Antiques			210 Main St.				pre-1870	
Firehouse Museum	Nevada City Firehouse No. 1	Right: 214 Main; Left: 216 Main	214 Main St.	Fire station	Eastlake movement		1861	
Antiques		Right: 214 Main; Left: 216 Main	216 Main St.	Commercial			c. 1861	
Michael's Garden Restaurant		Right: 216 Main; Left: 220 Main	216 Main St.	Food service	Victorian		1870/1890	
Mackay's Reality, et al.		Right: 216 Main; Left: 220 Main	220 Main St.	Residential then hospitality then office			pre-1880	
Berliner Office Building			224 Main St.	Residential then commercial then office			1890s	
Hatfield Offices			230 Main St.	Office, residential			c. 1870	
First Baptist Church	Old Brick Gothic Building		300 Main St.	Religious	Gothic		1857	
Waggoner House			308 Main St.	Residential			1874	
Nevada City Baptist Church	Powell House		203 S. Pine St.	Religious then residential			1860	
Mama Sue's Restaurant			108 S. Pine St.	Food Service			c. 1900	
Elk's Club			109 ½ N. Pine St.			J. H. Rogers	c. 1900	
Masonic Hall			108 ½ N. Pine St.			Brown and Palmer	1864/1900	
John L. Larue Building			205 – 207 N. Pine St.	Residential			1881	
Nevada City Public Library	Carnegie Library, Doris Foley Library		231 N. Pine St.	Library	Romanesque	William H. Weeks	1904 or 1907	NRHP No. 90001809
Spring Street Cafe			315 Spring St.	Food service			1884	
Heidelberger's Law Office			317 Spring St.	Office			1884	
Vacant Residence			320 Spring St.	Residential			1885	
American Victorian Museum	Miner's Foundry		325 Spring St.	Industrial			1859–1900	CHL No. 1012
Searls Historical Library	Searls Law Office		214 Church St.	Office			1872	
Nevada County Courthouse			Courthouse Square	Government	Art Moderne	George C. Sellon	1937	
St. Canice's Catholic Church			317 Washington St.	Religious	Gothic		1864	

== Additional buildings ==
The city of Nevada City, when they designated their own historic district in 1968, included buildings not listed by the NRHP. Even more buildings were listed by Nevada County in 1975. These buildings include:

Additional properties recognized by Nevada City and County

Listed Name	Alternate Name	Image	Address	Type	Style	Architect	Year built	Additional information
Methodist Church			433 Broad St.	Religious				
Trinity Episcopal Church			226 Nevada St.	Religious			1873	
Emil Ott House				Residential			1890s	
E. E. Berggron House				Residential				
Englebright House				Residential			Between 1856 and 1860	CPHI No. P326
Searls House				Residential				
Rector House			316 Nevada St.	Residential	Victorian		1888	
Nafziger House				Residential				
Martin Luther Marsh House			254 Boulder St.	Residential	Georgian		1873	CPHI No. P241; NRHP No. 73000415
Red Castle			109 Prospect St.	Residential	Carpenter Gothic		1862	CPHI No. P191
William Morris Stewart House			416 Zion St.	Residential			1855	CPHI No. P272
Aaron A. Sargent House			449 Broad St.	Residential	Italianate		prior to 1856	CPHI No. P305; NRHP No. 80000825
Aaron Baruh House			516 Main St.	Residential			1852	CPHI No. P382
Mr and Mrs W. Lon Cooper Residence				Residential			pre-1855, possible 1853	
Plaza Grocery			101 Broad St.	Commercial			1882	CPHI No. P325

== Additional sites ==
Additional sites mentioned by the city, county, or NRHP include:

- Calanan Park, 210 Broad St.
- Pioneer Cemetery, West Broad St.
- Medicine Rock, East Broad St.
- Ghidotti Gold Collection
