= Holbrooke Hotel =

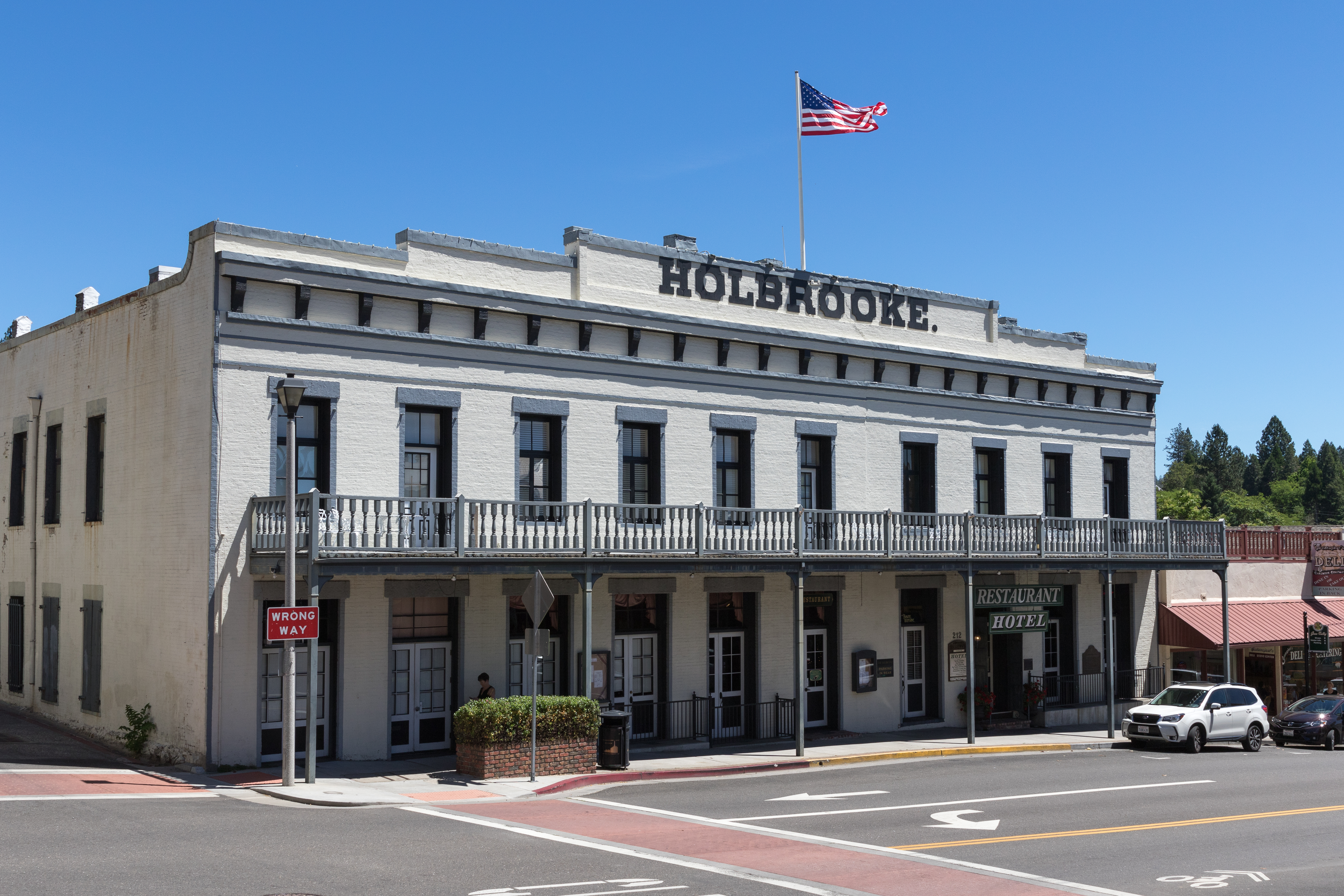

- Location within California
- 39°13.133′N 121°3.8′W
- Location: 212 West Main Street; Grass Valley CA 95945 USA

History
- Built: 1862

Site notes
- Architectural style: Mid-19th century Mother Lode masonry
- Governing body: Privately owned

California Historical Landmark
- Designated: March 18, 1978
- Reference no.: 914

The Holbrooke Hotel is located in Grass Valley, California, USA. It is notable as the oldest hotel that has been in continuous operation in California's Mother Lode. The hotel was built in 1862 in mid-19th century Mother Lode masonry architectural style, and incorporated the Golden Gate Saloon which has been in continuous operation since 1852.

== History ==
The original building, constructed in 1851 by Stephen and Clara Smith, was a saloon, the Golden Gate Saloon. The following year, a single-story annex, the Exchange Hotel, was added at the back of the saloon. The fire of 1855 burned down the saloon, but it was rebuilt with fieldstone and a brick facade. The Exchange Hotel was caught in a fire in 1862, after which it was renovated into a two-story structure. In 1879, it was named the Holbrooke Hotel after the owner, D. P. Holbrooke. The hotel continues to be privately owned.

Several notable people stayed at the hotel including “Gentleman Jim” Corbett, Lotta Crabtree, Bob Fitzsimmons, Bret Harte, Jack London, Lola Montez, Emma Nevada, Mark Twain, and five US Presidents: Grover Cleveland, James Garfield, Ulysses S. Grant, Benjamin Harrison, and Herbert Hoover.

== Description ==
The hotel has 28 rooms and is 19,400 square feet (1,800 m^{2}) in size. The interior includes copper clad walls, mahogany wood, Italian alabaster, and marble. It is furnished with globe chandeliers, green library lamps, and clawfoot bathtubs. The bar in the saloon was shipped around Cape Horn. The hotel was featured on a September 2013 episode of Hotel Impossible and an April 2016 episode of The Dead Files.

== Historical landmark ==
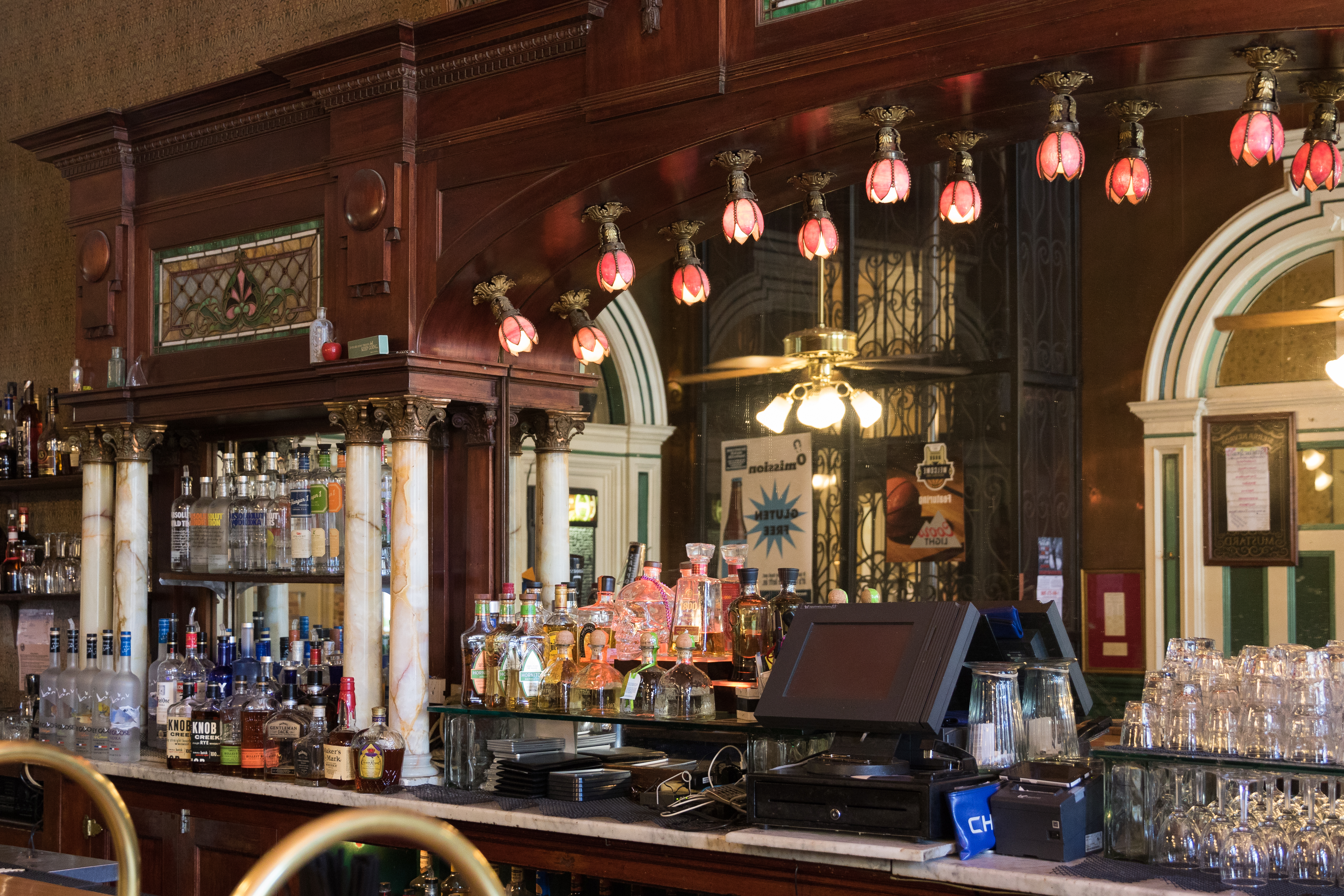
Formerly known as the Golden Gate Saloon, the bar at the Holbrooke Hotel has been in continuous operation since 1852

The Nevada County hotel became a California Historical Landmark, #914, on March 18, 1978. Another historical marker was placed on the building on September 25, 1965, by E Clampus Vitus.

== See also ==
- California Historical Landmarks in Nevada County
