= Alpha Hydraulic Diggings =

- Location within California
- 39.335454°N 120.7871621°W
- Location: Omega Rest Area, California State Route 20 (P.M. 35. 7), 6 miles east of Washington Road; Washington, California

California Historical Landmark
- Designated: January 29, 1958
- Reference no.: 628

The Alpha Hydraulic Diggings are located one mile north of what was the town of Alpha during the California Gold Rush in 1850, but the site is now near the unincorporated town of Washington, California. The diggings became a registered California Historical Landmark (No. 628) on January 29, 1958.

== Inscription ==
The plaque's inscription reads:

ALPHA AND OMEGA

One mile north of here were the towns of Alpha and Omega, named by gold miners in the early 1850s. The tremendous hydraulic diggings, visible from near this point, engulfed most of the original townsites. Alpha was the birthplace of famed opera singer Emma Nevada. Mining at Omega continued until 1949, and lumbering operations are carried on there today (1958).

California Registered Historical Landmarks Nos. 628-629
