= Kidd, Knox Building =

Historic building in Nevada City, California

- U.S. Historic district – Contributing property
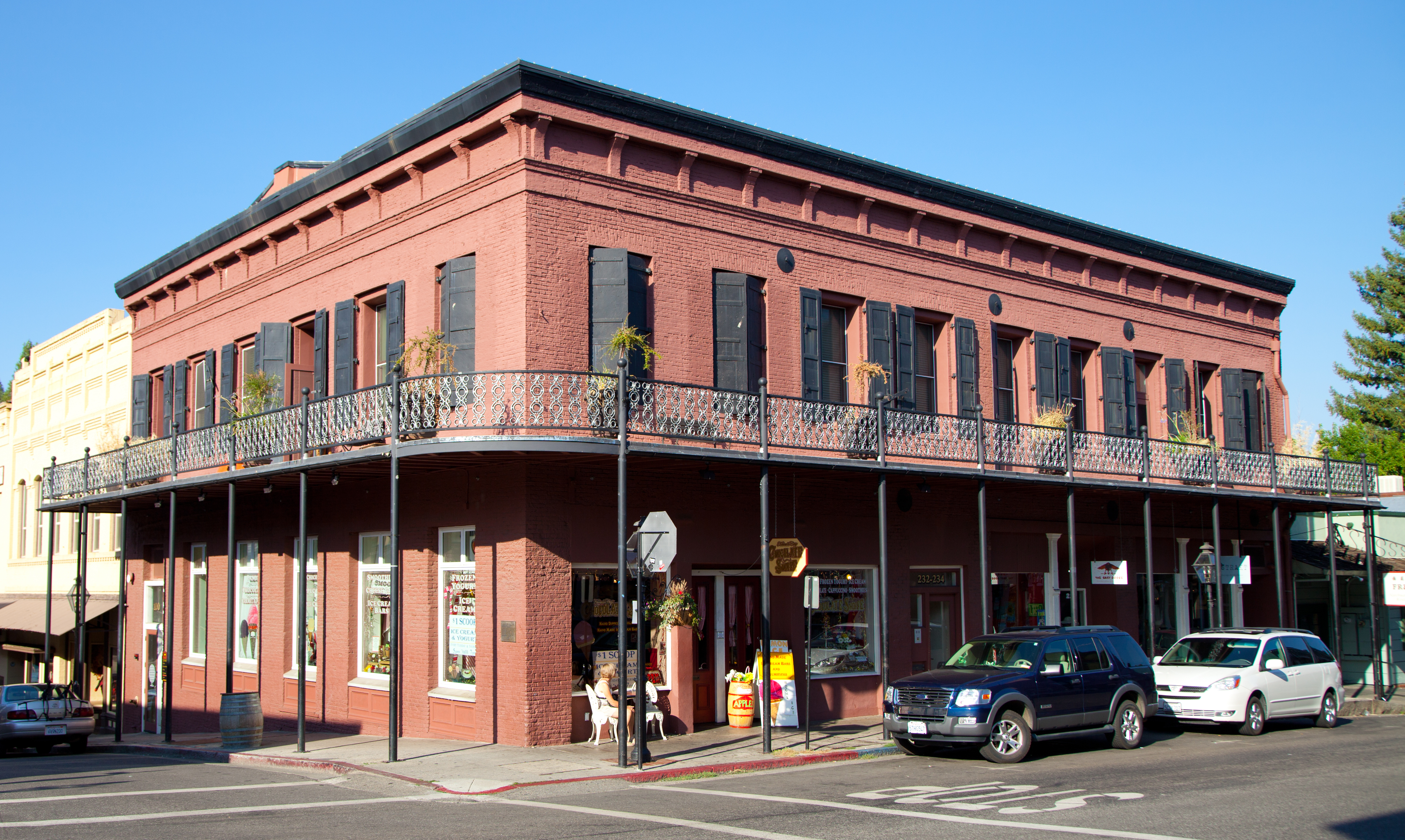
- The building in 2012

- Location within California
- Location: 228 – 236 Broad St.m, Nevada City, California
- Coordinates: 39.26285°N 121.01855°W
- Built: 1856
- Architectural style: brick masonry
- Part of: Nevada City Downtown Historic District (ID85002520)
- Designated CP: September 23, 1985

Kidd, Knox Building, also known as Kidd & Knox Building, Brown and Morgan Block, Durbrow Building, Freeman Building, and Baker-Tintle Building, is a historic building in Nevada City, California.

== History ==
The site of Kidd, Knox Building was previously home to Nevada City's first brick building. Kidd, Knox Building was built in 1856 after a fire damaged the previous building in this location as well as much of the rest of the city. Captain George Kidd and Dr. William Knox were the new building's owners.

Nevada City's Library Association, formed in December 1857, had their first library in this building until 1874. Numerous judges, lawyers, and statesmen have had offices in this building over the years, including senators Aaron A. Sargent and William M. Stewart and California Supreme Court chief justices Niles Searls and Lorenzo Sawyer. Native Sons of the Golden West formerly conducted business in the building's upper lodge rooms and performers Edwin Booth, Lola Montez, and Kate Hayes have performed in the dramatic hall as well.

The building was renamed Brown and Morgan Block at some point before 1900. It was known as Durbrow Building in the 1960s, named after the building's owner at the time: William Durbrow. By 1980, the building was owned by John and Christine Freeman and known as Freeman Building.

By the 1930s, the building's balcony and porches had been removed, while in 1985 the building had porches but no balcony. The Freemans would later restore the building's facades and rebuild its porches and balcony to closely resemble the originals.

The building was listed as a contributing property in the Nevada City Downtown Historic District in 1985.

The building was owned by Ken and Kay Baker and Gary and Patti Tintle and known as Baker-Tintle Building as of 2002.

== Architecture and design ==
Kidd, Knox Building is two-stories tall. Its exterior walls are made of 18 inch thick Flemish bond brick and are capped by a corbeled parapet that conceals a slightly sloping roof. Fenestration on the second story is accompanied by shutters made of iron, while the building's floors are made of wood and the roof is made of wood, gravel, and asphalt.

The building's front facade faces Broad Street, is 78 feet (24 m) in length, and is broken into nine bays, while the shorter Pine Street facade features six bays. An ornamental cast iron railing frames the second story balcony; it and the balcony run the length of the two facades and both feature a curved corner where the facades meet. The balcony itself is supported by wood columns that extend to the sidewalk outside the building.

== In popular culture ==
In the 1980s, Kidd, Knox Building was featured in a television commercial for a Midwestern savings and loan association.
