= Nevada City Winery =

Defunct winery in California, US

Coordinates: 39.2621°N 121.0198°W

Nevada City Winery was a winery in Nevada City, California. It was located in a small area of defunct City Brewery on Spring street three blocks west of Deer Creek. It was founded July 26, 1888 with a capital of $100,000. A year later produced 8,000 gallons of wine, enough to require it to buy up all the empty liquor casks in town to hold it. Despite enthusiastic newspaper coverage, locals favored beer at least as well and prohibition further suppressed winemaking in Nevada City. However Nevada City Winery did become the first bonded winery to open in Nevada County following Prohibition in the United States. But the mass production of cheap wines elsewhere in California, as well as the abundant grapes grown in that state's central valley, put a decades-long halt to wine-making and the last winery closed in the early 1950s.

Snow Mountain Winery opened in 1980, the first to bring professional winemaking back to the city. It named itself for the original Nevada City Brewery and moved to the Miners Foundry Garage in 1982. In 1990, its production was estimated at 8,000 cases per year, while in 1998, its production was estimated at 9,000 cases.

== See also ==
Sanborn Fire Map, Nevada City, 1891.
Sheet 1
Sheet 2
Sheet 3
