= South Yuba Canal Office =

Coordinates: 39.2629°N 121.0169°W

- U.S. Historic district – Contributing property
- California Historical Landmark
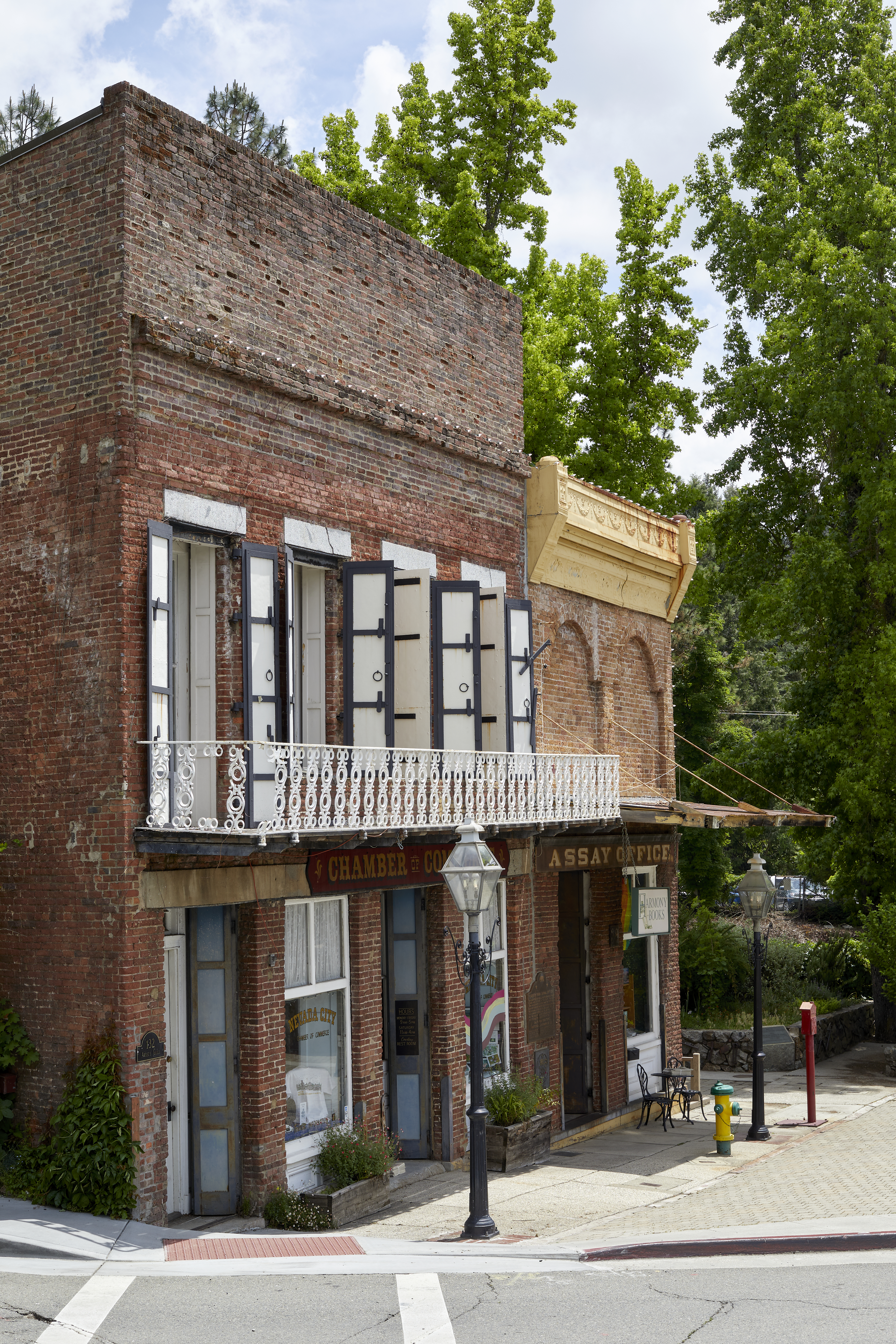
- South Yuba Canal Office in 2020
- Location: 134 Main Street; Nevada City, California, USA
- Built: 1855
- Part of: Nevada City Downtown Historic District (ID85002520)
- CHISL No.: 832

Significant dates
- Designated CP: September 23, 1985
- Designated CHISL: May 16, 1970

The South Yuba Canal Office was the headquarters for the largest network of water flumes and ditches in California. It is located at 134 Main Street, Nevada City, California, USA.

== Structure ==
Built in 1855, it was originally known as the Potter Building. A two-story brick structure, it was fitted with iron doors and shutters, plus a filigree balcony railing.

The space was first used as a drug store. From 1857 to 1880, it functioned as the South Yuba Canal Office. The Nevada City Chamber of Commerce is the building's current occupant. It is the oldest business building in Nevada City.

== South Yuba Canal Water Company ==
The South Yuba Canal Water Company that was run from this office was the first incorporated to supply water for hydraulic mining. Originally named in 1854 as the Rock Creek, Deer Creek, and South Yuba Canal Company as a consolidation of three rival ditch companies, the name was shortened in 1870 to the South Yuba Canal Company. Charles Marsh was the chief engineer and, it seems, one of the principals of the Rock Creek, Deer Creek, and South Yuba Canal Company (and was known as the "Father of Ditches"). The company built and operated flumes, reservoirs, and water ditches that carried water to connecting water systems that supplied hundreds of hydraulic mines in the area. In 1882, the company built a dam at Lake Fordyce to trap snowmelt and runoff for release in the dry season. The company later entered the utility business, and in 1905, its holdings went on to become a part of the Pacific Gas and Electric Company's hydroelectric system.

== South Yuba Canal ==
The company's original ditch was put into use in 1850. The South Yuba Canal is now part of the public lands of the Tahoe National Forest. The South Yuba Canal System is used for delivering domestic and agricultural water to Nevada City and its neighbor Grass Valley. The water also generates electricity in Northern California. It is approximately 18 mi (29 km) in length. Crossing private and National Forest lands, the canal is bordered by conifers and hardwoods.

== Landmark ==
In 1968, the building was included by the city of Nevada City in its historic district, where it was mentioned as an example of a building that has "great historical interest and esthetic value", contains "important historical exhibits and unique architectural specimens", and is "symbolic of the City's historical past."

The building is designated as California Historical Landmark No. 832. The plaque's inscription reads:

SOUTH YUBA CANAL OFFICE
Headquarters for the largest network of water flumes and ditches in the state. The South Yuba Canal Water Company was the first incorporated to supply water for hydraulic mining. The original ditch was in use in May 1850, and this company office was in use from 1857 to 1880. The holdings later became part of the vast PG&E hydroelectric system...California Registered Historical Landmark No. 832..Plaque placed by the State Department of Parks and Recreation in cooperation with the Nevada County Historical Landmarks Commission and the California Heritage Council, May 16, 1970.

== See also ==
- California Historical Landmarks in Nevada County
