= John Poole =

John Poole may refer to:

== Politicians ==
- John Poole (Canadian politician) (1872–1963), member of the Legislative Assembly of Manitoba
- John Poole (died 1601), MP for Liverpool
- Sir John Poole, in 1593, MP for Much Wenlock (UK Parliament constituency)

== Others ==
- H. John Poole, military author
- Jack Poole (1933–2009), Canadian businessman
- John Poole (footballer, born 1892) (1892–1967), English football defender and manager
- John Poole (footballer, born 1932) (1932–2020), English football goalkeeper for Port Vale
- John Poole (playwright) (1786–1872), English playwright
- John Poole (sculptor) (1926–2009), British sculptor
- John C. Poole (1887–1926), American etcher and wood engraver
- Jon Poole (born 1969), British singer-songwriter
- Jon Poole or John Poole, drummer of the American Christian rock band Echoing Angels

== See also ==
- John Pool (1826–1884), US Senator
- John Pool (MP) for Wycombe (UK Parliament constituency)
