= National Exchange Hotel =

- U.S. National Register of Historic Places
- U.S. Historic district – Contributing property
- California Historical Landmark No. 899
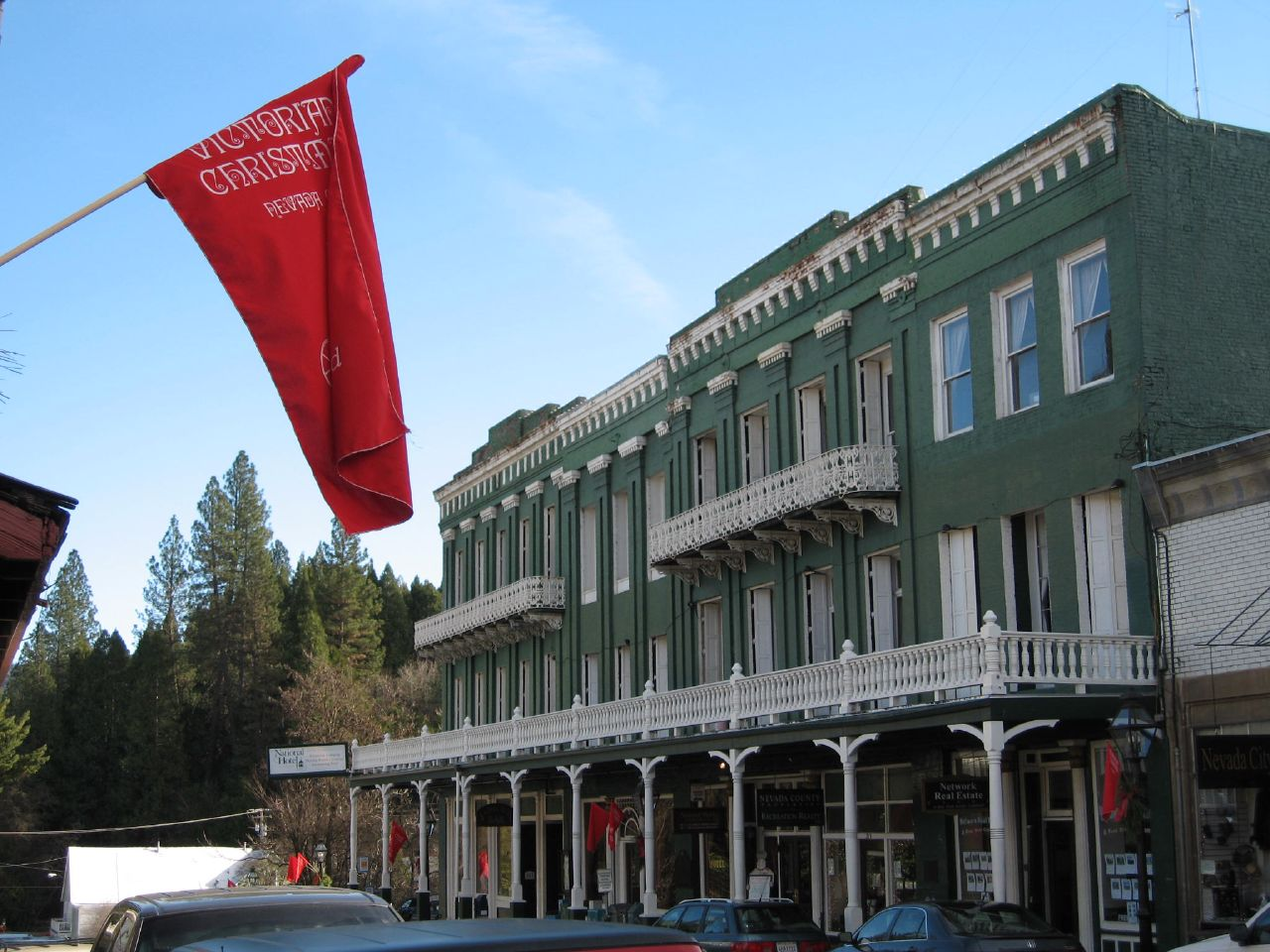
- The building in 2007
- Location: 211 Broad St., Nevada City, California
- Coordinates: 39.2622°N 121.01790°W
- Built: 1856
- Architectural style: Brick masonry, Classical Revival
- Part of: Nevada City Downtown Historic District (ID85002520)
- NRHP reference No.: 73000416
- CHISL No.: 899

Significant dates
- Added to NRHP: October 25, 1973
- Designated CP: September 23, 1985
- Designated CHISL: June 16, 1976

National Exchange Hotel, formerly Bicknell Block, also known as National Hotel, is a historic hotel located in Nevada City, California. It is the most imposing building in downtown Nevada City and one of the oldest continuously operating hotels west of the Rockies.

== History ==
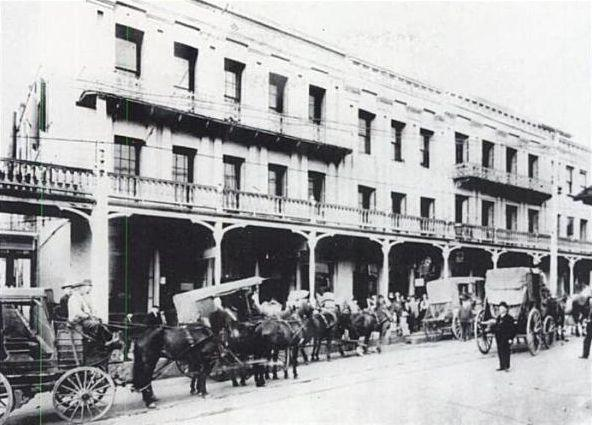
The hotel in 1894

The building that would become the National Exchange Hotel was originally built in 1856 by an architect with the surname of Todd for a dentist whose surname was Bicknell. The building originally consisted of three storefronts with rooms for rent above, all connected by common walls. Originally, the southern storefront was occupied by a store, the center by Bicknell, and the northern by a gun shop. The building's original name was Bicknell Block.

After a citywide fire in 1856 in which Bicknell Block was unharmed, the entirety of Bicknell Block was leased by Pearson and Healy, whose nearby United States Hotel had been destroyed. On August 20 1856, Pearson and Healy reopened the building as the National Exchange Hotel, which in addition to hotel service, also served as the city's center of communications and travel. It also was the site of California's first whipping post.

Another citywide fire in 1863 shut down the hotel, which reopened after rehabilitation in April 1864. Brothers John and Bayliss Rector bought the hotel in 1882 and owned it until their deaths in 1914 and 1915, respectively. A new balcony was added to the building sometime before 1894 and an annex connected by a second-story glass encased passageway was added c. 1890, then torn down in 1968.

In 1925, Fred C. Worth assumed control of the hotel from descendants of the Rector brothers, after which he modernized it, adding amongst other items electricity and central heating. George Murphy then bought the hotel in 1946 and Tom Coleman took over ownership in 1979.

In 1968, the hotel was included by the city of Nevada City in its historic district, where it was mentioned as an example of a building that has "great historical interest and esthetic value", contains "important historical exhibits and unique architectural specimens", and is "symbolic of the City's historical past." The building was also included in the National Register of Historic Places in 1973, designated a California Historic Landmark in 1976, and included as a contributing property in the Nevada City Downtown Historic District in 1985.

The hotel was bought by Jordan Fife in 2018 and put up for sale again in 2024.

=== Guests ===
Nevada City businessman John J. Jackson claimed an 1898 meeting at the National Hotel resulted in the creation of Pacific Gas and Electric. Other notable figures who've stayed in the hotel include Mark Twain, Herbert Hoover, and Andrew Johnson.

== Architecture and design ==
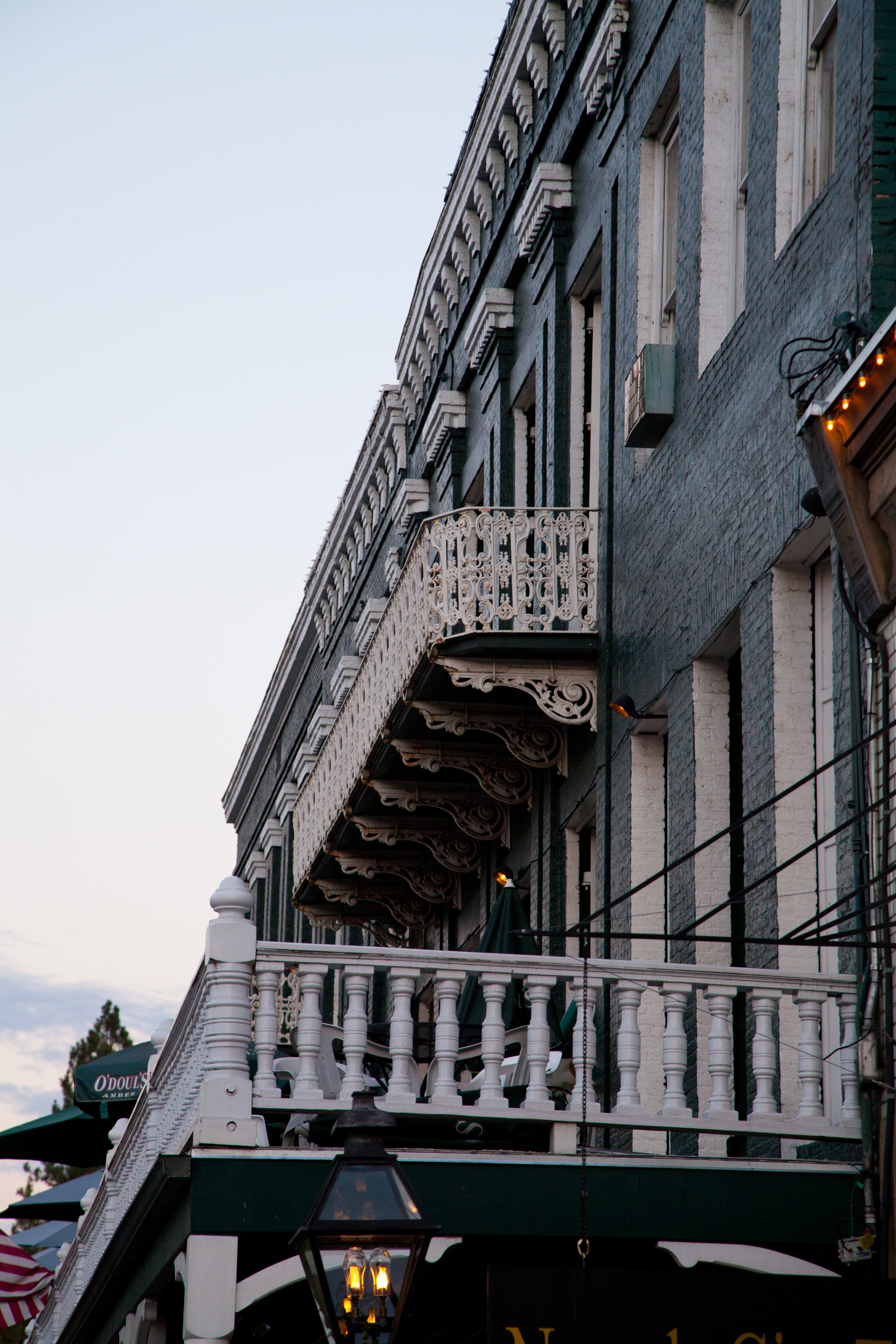
The hotel's balustraded veranda, ornamental balcony, corbeled parapet, and brick facade with double pilasters, capitals, cornice, dentils, and metopes, 2012

National Exchange Hotel, a three-story brick masonry commercial structure that was originally built as three buildings with common walls, has been described as possessing "dignity", "charm", and "elegance."

The building's exterior English-bond brick walls are 18 inches (46 cm) thick and rise to a corbeled parapet that conceals a separate wood-framed gabled roof. The building's floors are wood-framed as well. Windows on the upper two stories are separated by double pilasters topped by a capital embellished by cornice formed by dentils and modeled with metopes.

The building's facade is divided into sections that alternate wide and narrow. Cast iron framed balconies extend from the wide sections of the third story and feature Classical Revival railings and brackets made of ornamental iron. The second story features a wood-column-supported balustraded veranda that runs the entire width of the building and extends over a "handsome" wood portico and the sidewalk below. The first floor consists of offices, shops, and two entrances: one to the hotel's dining room and another to a stairway that leads to the hotel lobby on the second floor.

At the rear of the building, the ground is even with the second floor, allowing for an additional entrance. Also at the rear is a two-story apartment section that features a belvedere.

Inside, the building features its original structural walls and high ceilings throughout.

== In popular culture ==
The hotel was the subject of an episode of Ghost Adventures in 2012.

== See also ==
- National Register of Historic Places listings in Nevada County, California
- California Historical Landmarks in Nevada County
