= Alpha, California =

Alpha
- Former settlement
- Location in California
- Coordinates: 39°19′50″N 120°46′53″W
- Country: United States
- State: California
- County: Nevada County
- Elevation: 4,120 ft (1,260 m)
- Time zone: UTC-8 (Pacific (PST))
  - Summer (DST): UTC-7 (PDT)

Alpha was a gold mining town in Nevada County, located about 2 miles southeast of the town of Washington, California and about 15 miles northeast of Nevada City, California. It lay at an elevation of 4120 feet, about 2 miles below the South Yuba River and just west of Scotchman Creek.

== Early history ==
Miners begin to explore the area around Alpha in 1850 but the town began in 1852 when Charles Phelps and a Mr. McVey "struck it rich on what became the townsite itself." Supposedly originally named “Hell-out-for-noon,” the name was soon changed to Alpha, the first letter in the Greek alphabet. The origin of the original name does not appear to be known, but Alpha was believed to be the start of a rich channel of gold which stretched a mile or so to the east and ended in the town of Omega, the last letter in the Greek alphabet. The Alpha Diggings, as the area was commonly called, was routinely described as having very rich gold deposits. As one newspaper observed: "There is no doubt but that the miners of this section are doing, on average, as well as any other part of the country.... We have no doubt that Alpha will yet prove one of the richest mining sections of the country." A year later, that paper announced that "Alpha contains one of the richest auriferous deposits to be found."

The area quickly attracted many miners and its heyday is generally reckoned to have been in the mid-1850s. During that period, it developed a reputation as "one of the liveliest mining towns in the county." It had several hundred inhabitants, at least two hotels, saloons, gambling houses, a clothing store and a blacksmith shop. It had its share of traveling entertainments and balls. It had an election precinct, with votes generally cast at the Alpha Hotel or at Wixom's Hotel. In 1860, 66 votes were cast, 26 for Lincoln, 21 for Douglas and 19 for Breckenridge.

A post office was established at Alpha in 1855. Andrew J. Alston, a sawmill owner, was the first postmaster. The post office closed in 1862 and residents had to get their mail in Washington. Alpha had a Masonic Lodge, Dibble No. 109 which opened in 1856, as well as a Sons of Temperance center. It was connected by stage to Washington, which ran daily, and to Nevada City. During winter, when the snow could reach 9 feet deep, passengers often had to shift to horse-drawn sleighs for the last part of their journey. And it had a telegraph line. It did not have a school for children, though it had a whistling school, a singing school and a dancing school. Nor did it have a church, though there are reports of occasional services at the temperance hall by traveling ministers. Alpha also experienced what seems like an above average amount of robberies and murders.

== Mining ==
Contemporary accounts agree that Alpha was the site of a rich gold mining field. At times, miners could regularly make $20–50 a day. An early problem was a scarcity of water during the summer. This meant that the area was busy and populated during the winter but largely deserted during the summer. That gradually changed with the arrival of ditches and canals. The Buckeye Ditch was first, bringing water from nearby Scotchman Creek. It was followed by the Virginia Ditch, owned by Harbin and Cuthbertson, which brought water from the South Yuba, and the Omega Ditch. Finally, in January 1858, the South Yuba Canal arrived, bringing a substantial supply of water through an extensive and expensive series of flumes and ditches. With a reliable source of water, hydraulic mining soon blossomed. However, the mines quickly became depleted and by the mid-1860s, only Captain Merriman's mine was still operating. In the 1870s and early 1880s, some mining continued. Many of the sites were being worked by Chinese miners who were sifting through the tailing deposits to reclaim gold that had been missed. At the same time, the Alpha Hydraulic Mining Company, which had bought all the mining land around Alpha, continued hydraulic mining. That pretty much ended after the Woodruff v. North Bloomfield Gravel Mining Company court decision prohibited the discharge of mining debris into the South Yuba River or its tributaries. Some illegal mining continued, often by Chinese miners who were periodically arrested and fined for violating the Sawyer injunction.

== Lumbering ==
The other important industry around Alpha was lumbering. In the 1850s, it had at least three sawmills: McWorthey's, Skillman's and Murdock's. Skillman's was located about 1 mile west of Alpha and burned in 1858 with a loss of 300,000 feet of lumber. Murdock's mill burned in 1859. It is not clear whether either mill was rebuilt. The sawmills provided Alpha with a readily source of lumber for home building which meant that unlike many gold rush towns, it was not full of canvas stores and buildings. As one historian put it, "board was cheaper than canvas." Later, the Towle Bros. built a narrow gauge railroad which ran from their base north of Alta to their sawmill about 2 miles south of Alpha. This gave Alpha an additional advantage, allowing supplies to be brought by rail from Alta, rather than by wagon from Nevada City. Lumbering operations continued well into the 20th century.

== The Wixom Family ==
One of the leading families in Alpha was that of Dr. William and Marie Wixom. In addition to practicing medicine, William Wixom was elected justice of the peace for Washington Township, operated the Wixom hotel, and served as agent for the Langton Express Company. He was a member of the Dibble Masonic lodge. In 1859, their daughter Emma was born at Alpha. In the 1860s, Dr. Wixom and his family moved first to Omega and then to Austin, Nevada, where Emma gained fame for her singing, earning the sobriquet "the Alpha Nightingale." She moved on to perform in Europe then in America under the stage name Emma Nevada.

== Decline ==
As the mines declined and people left, Alpha quickly became essentially a ghost town. A resident wrote in his diary on November 6, 1863, that there were "only a few people left in Alpha." Many residents moved one mile east to Omega, which continued to flourish for many years. The Masonic Lodge was moved to Omega. Other residents followed new strikes in Nevada. In 1864, only 19 people voted in the presidential election. Gradually, empty buildings were torn down and they would be used for firewood or to build in Omega. By 1880, an historian noted that "Alpha is now worked out and abandoned." During its brief period, it is estimated that $2 million in gold was produced in the Alpha diggings. In 1924, an historian observed that "Alpha and Omega have long since passed into oblivion, save as a memory of the thriving settlements of the early 50s and 60s."
