= Nevada County Superior Court =

California superior court with jurisdiction over Nevada County

Superior Court of California, County of Nevada
- Interactive map of Superior Court of California, County of Nevada
- Established: 1850
- Jurisdiction: Nevada County, California
- Location: Nevada City (county seat); Truckee
- Appeals to: California Court of Appeal for the Third District
- Website: nevada.courts.ca.gov

Presiding Judge
- Currently: Hon. S. Robert Tice-Raskin

Assistant Presiding Judge
- Currently: Hon. B. Scott Thomsen

Court Executive Officer
- Currently: Laila A. Waheed

The Superior Court of California, County of Nevada, also known as the Nevada County Superior Court or Nevada Superior Court, is the California superior court with jurisdiction over Nevada County.

== History ==
Nevada County was partitioned from Yuba County in 1851. Thomas H. Caswell was elected the first County Judge in May 1851 and Nevada City was named the county seat. The first courthouse was a log building completed in 1851 on Broad Street.

In its early years, Nevada City was regularly swept by fires, including March 1851, September 1852, November 1854, and February 1855; a particularly disastrous fire, fanned by winds on July 19, 1856, destroyed most of the city, including the first county courthouse. A second courthouse was built in 1856 as a two-story granite and brick building in the Greek Revival style; it occupied the block bounded by Church, Pine, Washington, and Main overlooking the city's retail district on Broad. It was saved from destruction in the fire of May 23, 1858, by wet blankets and bucket brigades; however, another disastrous fire on November 8, 1863, destroyed the second courthouse. Some of the bricks were reused in the city's Masonic Hall.

The third courthouse was built on the same site in 1864. The 1864 courthouse was remodeled in 1900 to add a third storey. In 1937, it underwent a more thorough remodeling under the guidance of architect George C. Sellon, funded by the Works Progress Administration and gaining an Art Deco / Streamline Moderne facade. An annex was added in 1964, designed by Mau & Barnum to expand County office space and the jail.

In 1985, the courthouse was listed as a contributing property in the National Register of Historic Places-listed Nevada City Downtown Historic District, while the courthouse annex was listed as non-contributing.

== Venues ==
Nevada County Superior Court locations:
1 201 Church St (Nevada City)
2 10075 Levon Ave (Truckee)

- Nevada County Courthouse
- U.S. Historic district – Contributing property
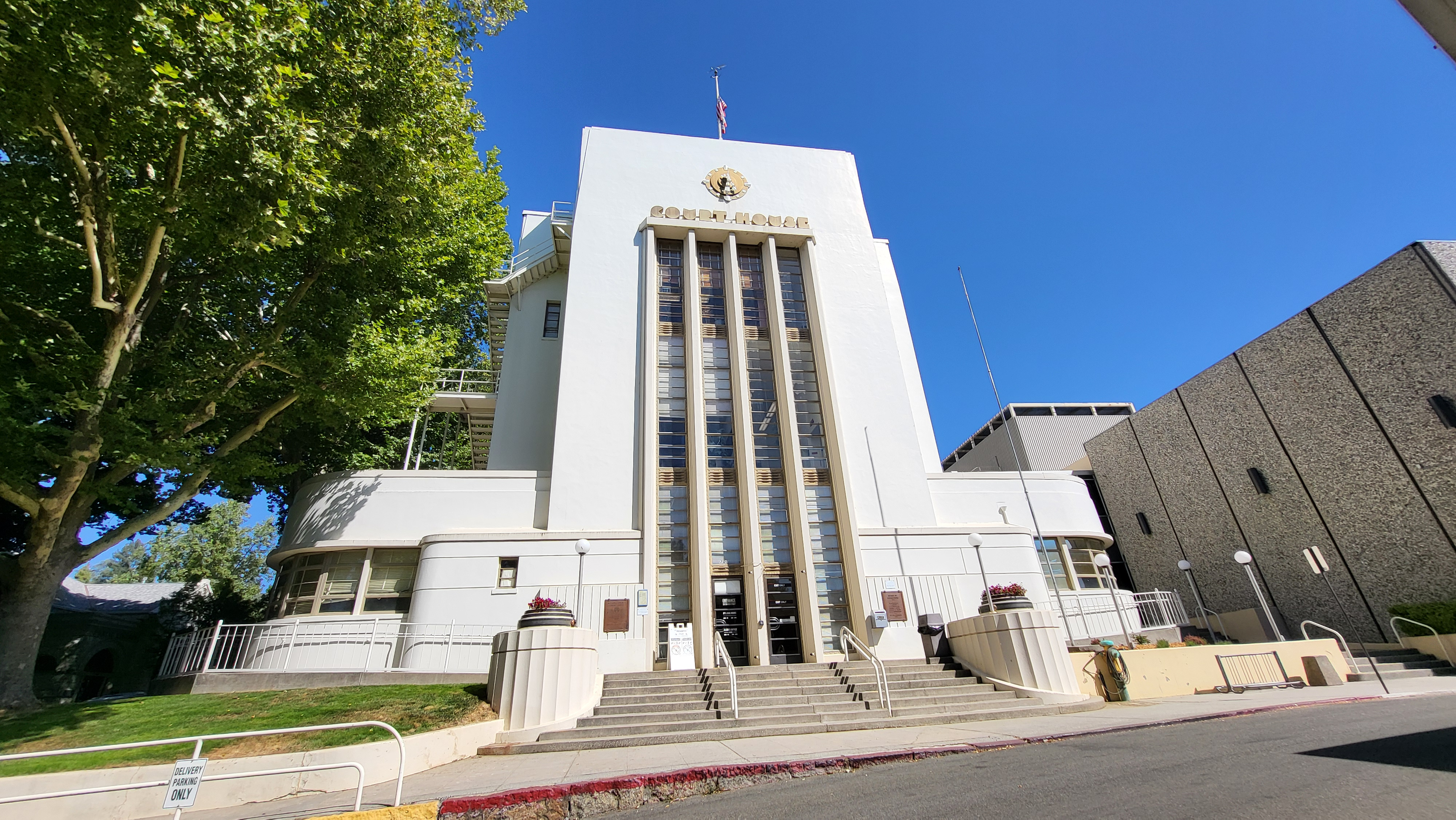
- The building in 2025
- Location: Courthouse Square; Nevada City, California
- Coordinates: 39.26390°N 121.01814°W
- Built: 1864, 1900, 1937; 1964 (annex)
- Architect: George C. Sellon; Mau & Barnum (annex)
- Architectural style: Art Moderne
- Part of: Nevada City Downtown Historic District (ID85002520)
- Designated CP: September 23, 1985

The existing Nevada City courthouse complex, built and remodeled between 1864 and 1964, is approximately 70,000 ft^{2} (6,500 m^{2}) in total; it is considered "unsafe, undersized, substandard, overcrowded, lacks parking, and is functionally deficient", being non-compliant with seismic and fire codes and fails to comply with Americans with Disabilities Act standards. A planning study was completed in June 2022 to examine options to bring the Nevada City courthouse into compliance, including remodeling the existing complex or building a new courthouse, either at the existing site or at a new site near the County Government Center in Nevada City. The judges of the Nevada County Superior Court expressed their support for option 2, which would be a new building at the existing site.

The branch in Truckee handles all judicial affairs for the eastern part of the county except juvenile justice.

=== Architecture and design ===
Nevada City's county courthouse building is considered "an outstanding example of the Art Moderne style," so much so that architecture students have come from as far as the East Coast to study it. The building features a tall center section and emphatic vertical lines, all of which emphasize the verticality of the building. Sweeping curved one-story wings are located on either side of the center, and ornamentation is sparse for the entire building.

The courthouse annex was built of reinforced concrete, glass, and steel. It is considered non-conforming with respect to the courthouse and the downtown historic district.

== Gallery ==
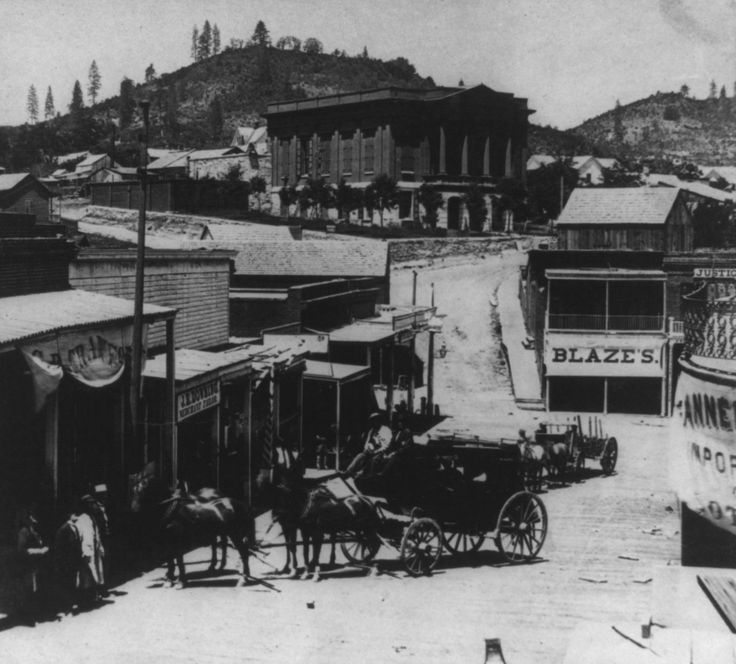
Nevada City venue's original appearance (c. 1868)

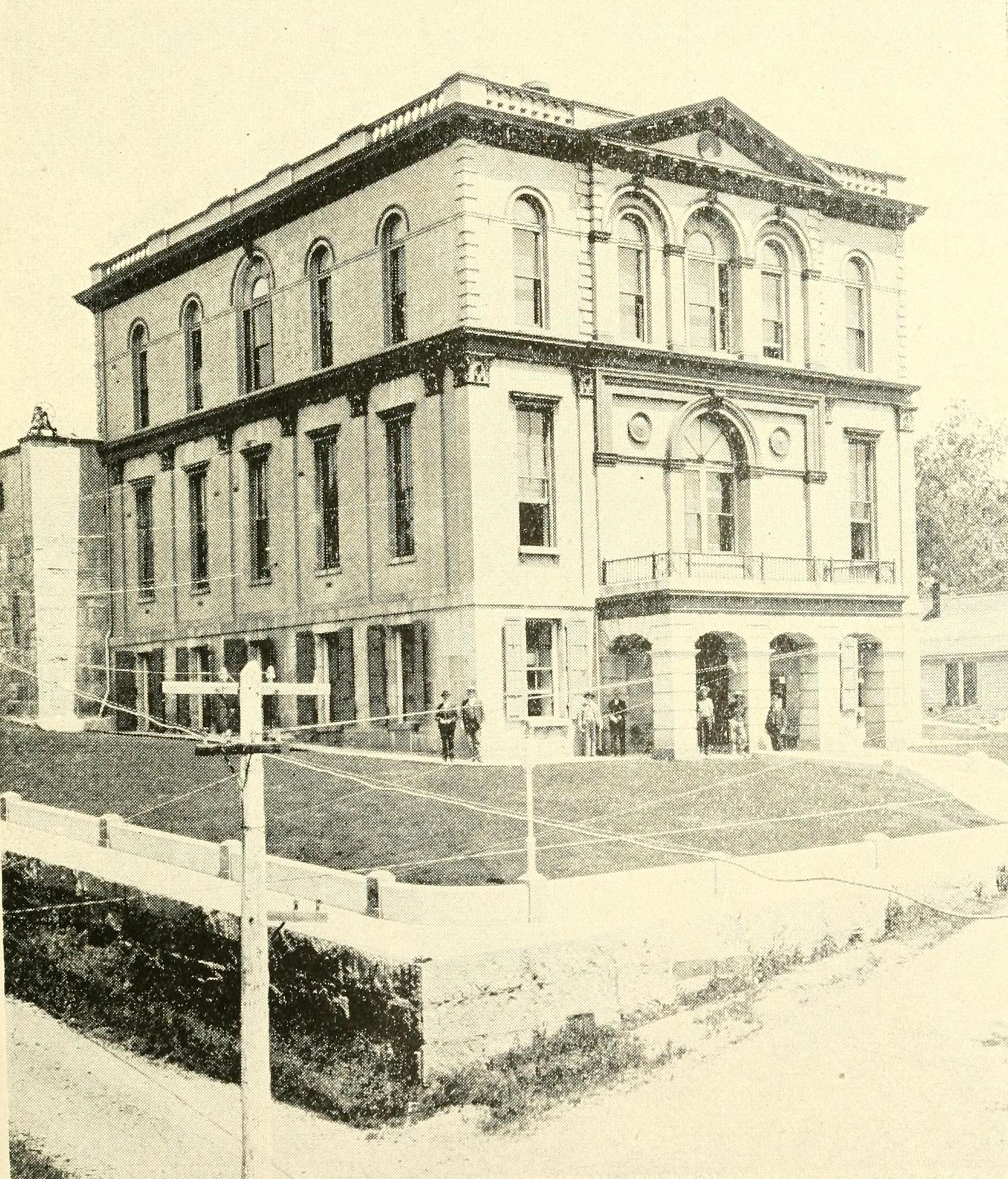
Appearance after 1900 addition (c. 1904)

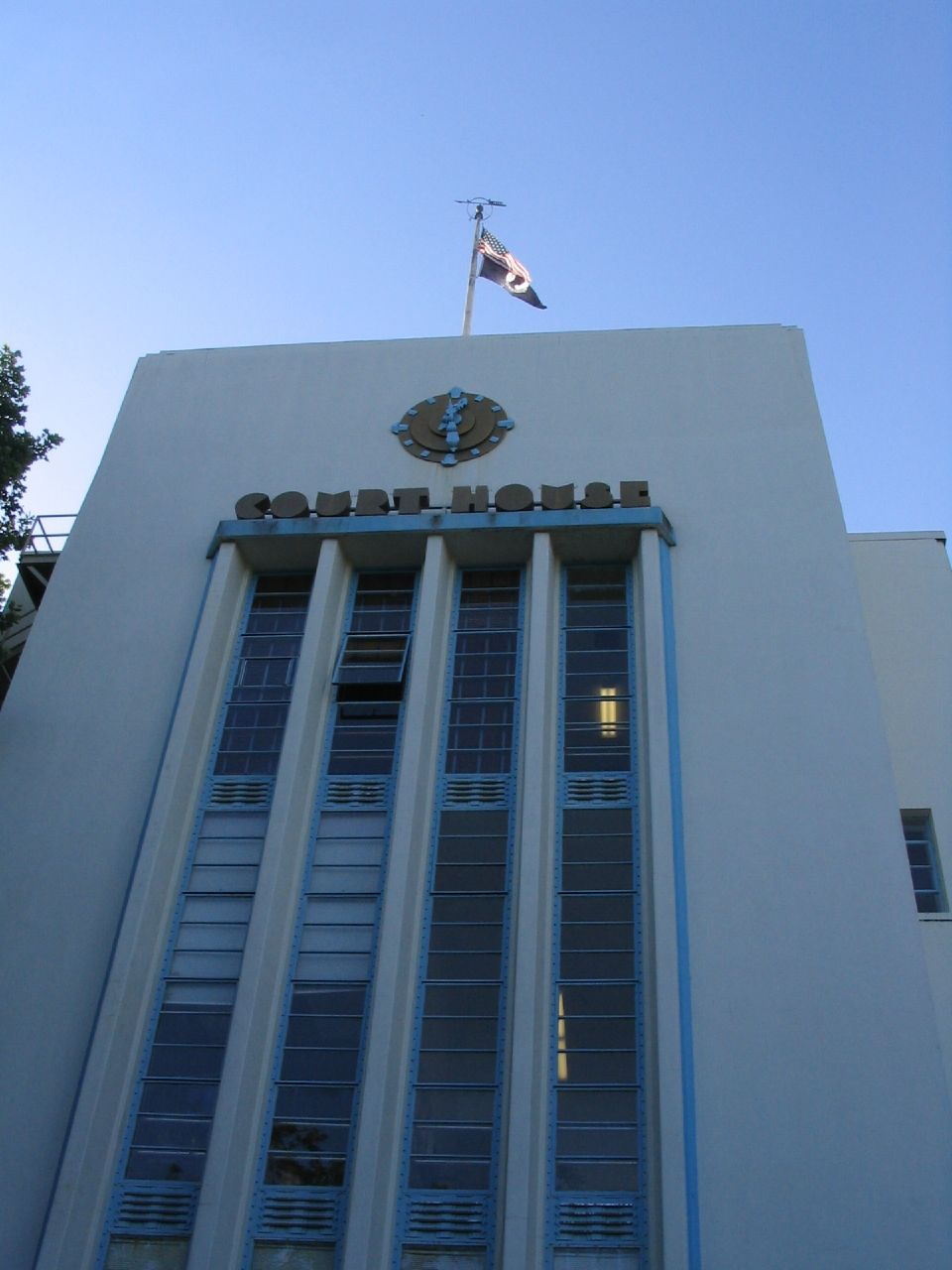
Appearance after 1937 remodel (2010)
