= Trinity Church (Nevada City) =

Church in California, United States

Coordinates: 39.263399°N 121.015835°W

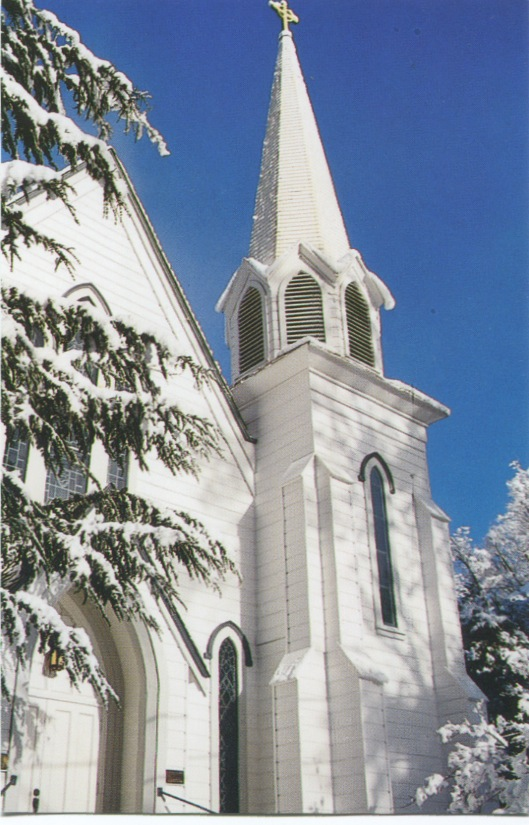
Trinity Church, Nevada City, California

Trinity Church is an Episcopal Church located in Nevada City, California, within the Episcopal Diocese of Northern California.

== History ==
On April 21, 1854, The Right Reverend William Ingraham Kip, Bishop of California, held the first Episcopal Church service in Nevada City. A group of Episcopalians formed a congregation and a year and a day later, the Parish of the Holy Trinity was formally organized and incorporated.

The first Trinity Church was constructed at the corner of Main and Church Streets at a cost of $4000. It was dedicated in March 1863. During a conflagration in November of the same year, Trinity Church caught fire and only the bell and stained glass window could be salvaged.

The congregation decided that their church must be moved away from the centre of the city to avoid any more fires. In 1869 a new site was purchased on Aristocracy Hill, a few hundred yards away across a valley from the former site and which was never affected by Nevada City's fires. It had been the site of Washington School, the first school in Nevada City when it was little more than a mining camp, but the growing population made a new school necessary.

Built in a New England style at a cost of $5000, Trinity Church was dedicated on November 2, 1872. The stained glass window rescued from the fire was installed above the altar, and the bell was hung in the tower. The church has been at this new location at the corner of Nevada and High Streets ever since. It is said to have been modeled on St. James's Episcopal Church in Sonora, California.
