= Emma Nevada =

American opera singer

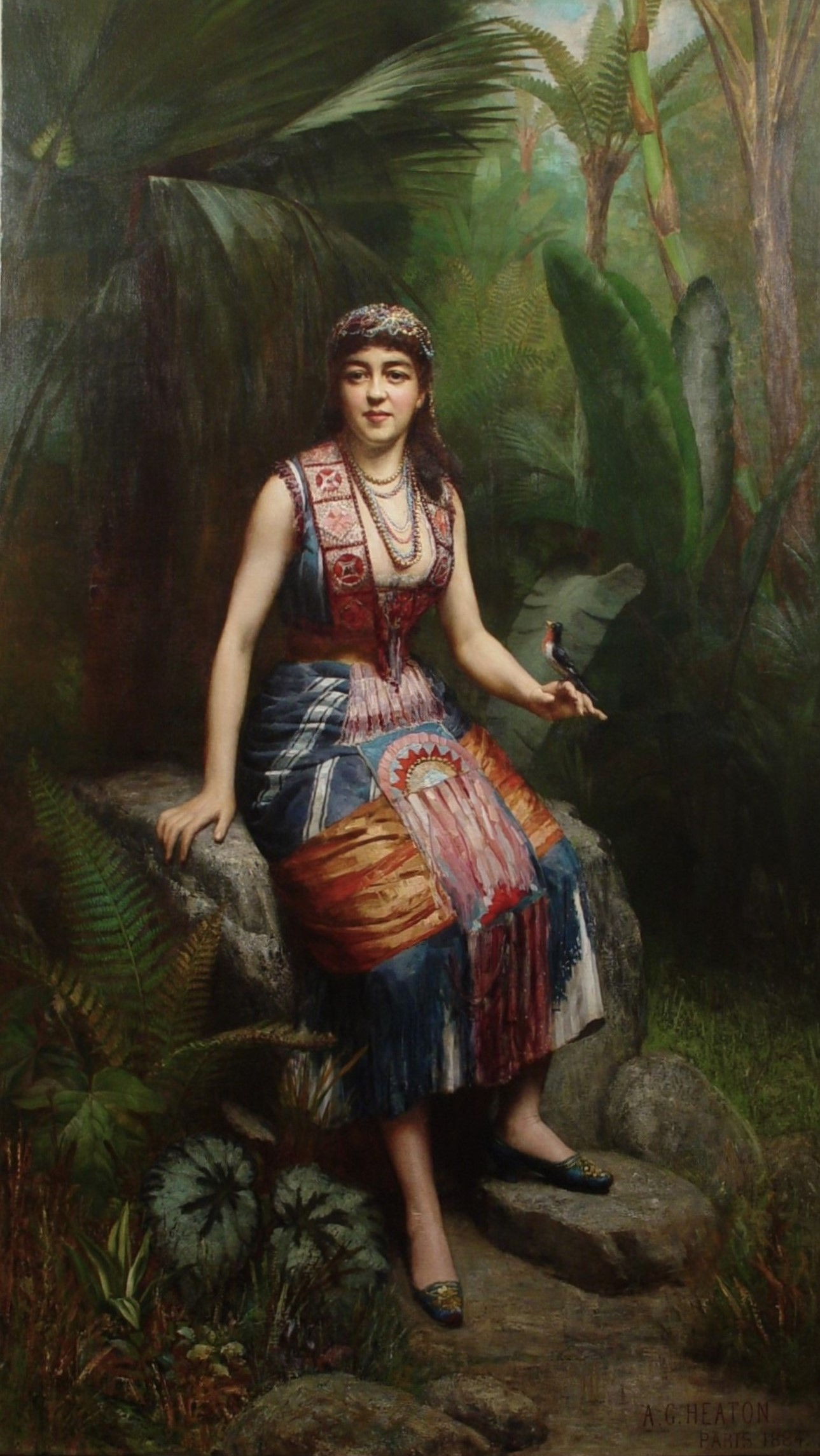
Emma Nevada as Nora in The Pearl of Brazil, by Augustus Goodyear Heaton in Paris 1884. This portrait hangs at the Academy of Music in Philadelphia

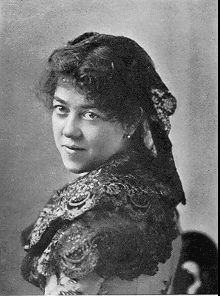
Emma Nevada in 1885.

Emma Nevada (née Wixom) (7 February 1859 – 20 June 1940) was an American operatic coloratura soprano particularly known for her performances in operas by Bellini and Donizetti and the French composers Ambroise Thomas, Charles Gounod, and Léo Delibes. Considered one of the finest coloratura sopranos of the late 19th and early 20th centuries, her most famous roles were Amina in La sonnambula, and the title roles in Lakmé, Mignon, Mireille, and Lucia di Lammermoor.

== Biography ==
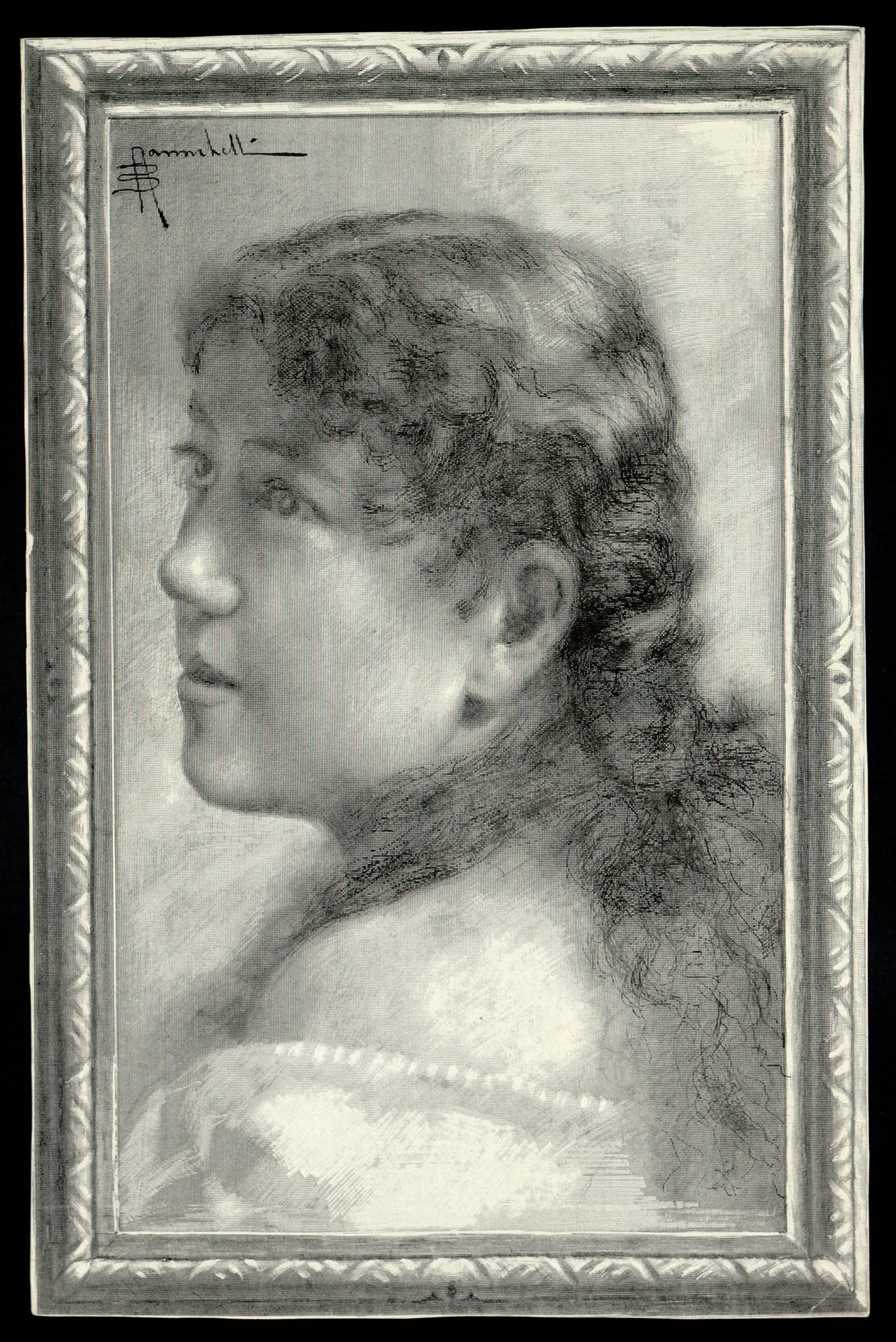
Portrait of Emma Nevada, soprano (1859-1940), before 1917.

Emma Nevada was born in Alpha, California, to Maria O'Boy Wixom and Dr. William Wallace Wixom, who was the physician for the gold mine camp there. She spent her early childhood in nearby Nevada City (from which she took her stage name) and made her public singing debut at Nevada City Baptist Church at age three or five. She and her family then moved to Austin, Nevada. A gifted linguist who learned sign language for the deaf and spoke Paiute, Washoe and Shoshone, she studied Spanish, Italian, French and German at Mills College in California as well as music. She then studied singing for three years in Vienna with Mathilde Marchesi before making her stage debut at Her Majesty's Theatre in London as Amina in La sonnambula on 17 May 1880. She was an adept fencer and also practiced with Indian clubs to maintain her physical stamina for singing opera.

Debuts followed at La Scala in Milan in 1881 and the Opéra-Comique in Paris in 1883 when she sang Zora in Félicien-César David's La perle du Brésil. In 1884 she toured the United States with Mapleson's opera company, after which she returned to Europe where she continued to sing in leading opera houses and concert halls. The Mapleson tour was the only time she sang on the opera stages of her native country, although she did return to the United States for concert tours in 1885, 1899, and 1901. Pablo Casals was one of the trio of musicians accompanying her in the 1901 concerts.

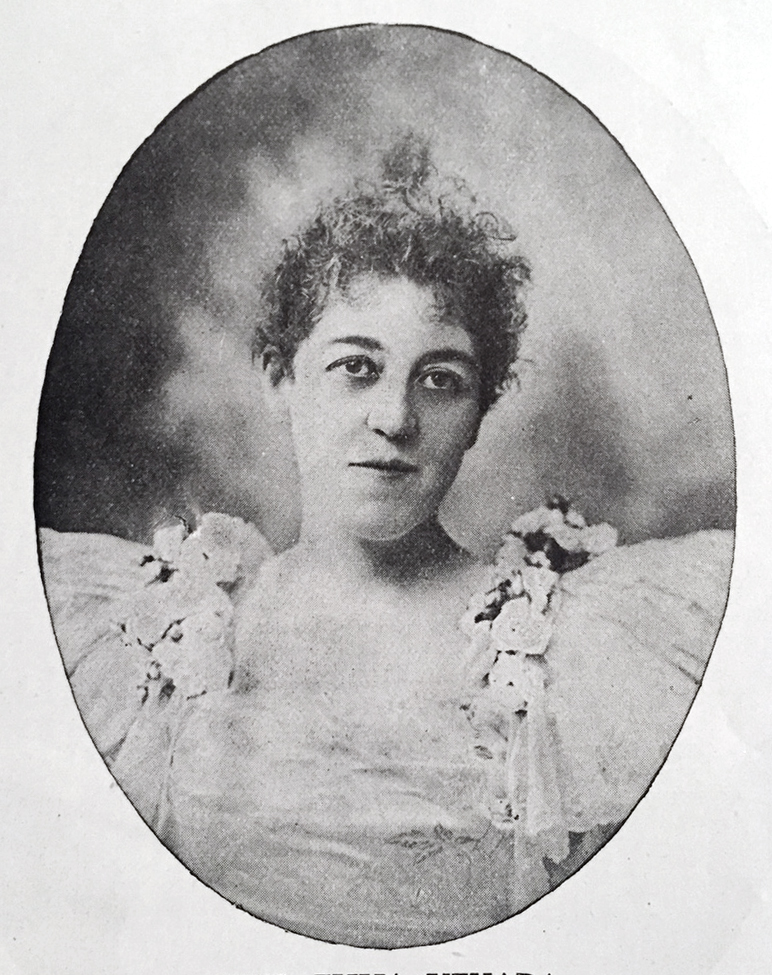
Emma Nevada, 1899.

In October 1885, Nevada married Raymond Palmer, an English physician, who was to become her manager. The wedding took place in Paris with Ambroise Thomas giving the bride away. The couple settled in Paris and had one daughter, Mignon, who also became an opera singer under the stage name of Mignon Nevada. Mignon's godparents were Ambroise Thomas and Mathilde Marchesi.

Nevada's last performance was in Lakmé in Berlin in 1910, after which she retired from the stage and taught singing in England. Emma Nevada died near Liverpool at the age of 81. A medallion with her portrait, along with those of Giuditta Pasta and Maria Malibran, adorns Bellini's monument in Naples.

Her flute-like voice was small but she used it expertly—Sir Thomas Beecham immediately christened her "a natural coloratura equal to any of her contemporaries."

The actress Erin O'Brien was cast as Emma Nevada in the 1960 episode, "Emma Is Coming", on the syndicated anthology series, Death Valley Days, hosted by Stanley Andrews. The episode is set in Austin, Nevada, where she was reared. Rick Jason was cast as Duke Clayton, a local tough-guy who developed a fond interest in Emma, and Alan Reed played Emma's manager, James Henry Mapleson.

In the 1930s, Disney animator Ward Kimball purchased Nevada Central Railroad Engine #2, and restored it. He named the 1881 engine the "Emma Nevada," since she was from Austin, Nevada and the railroad was built to serve the mines there. Later, he donated the engine (and a large collection of other rolling stock) to the Southern California Railway Museum.

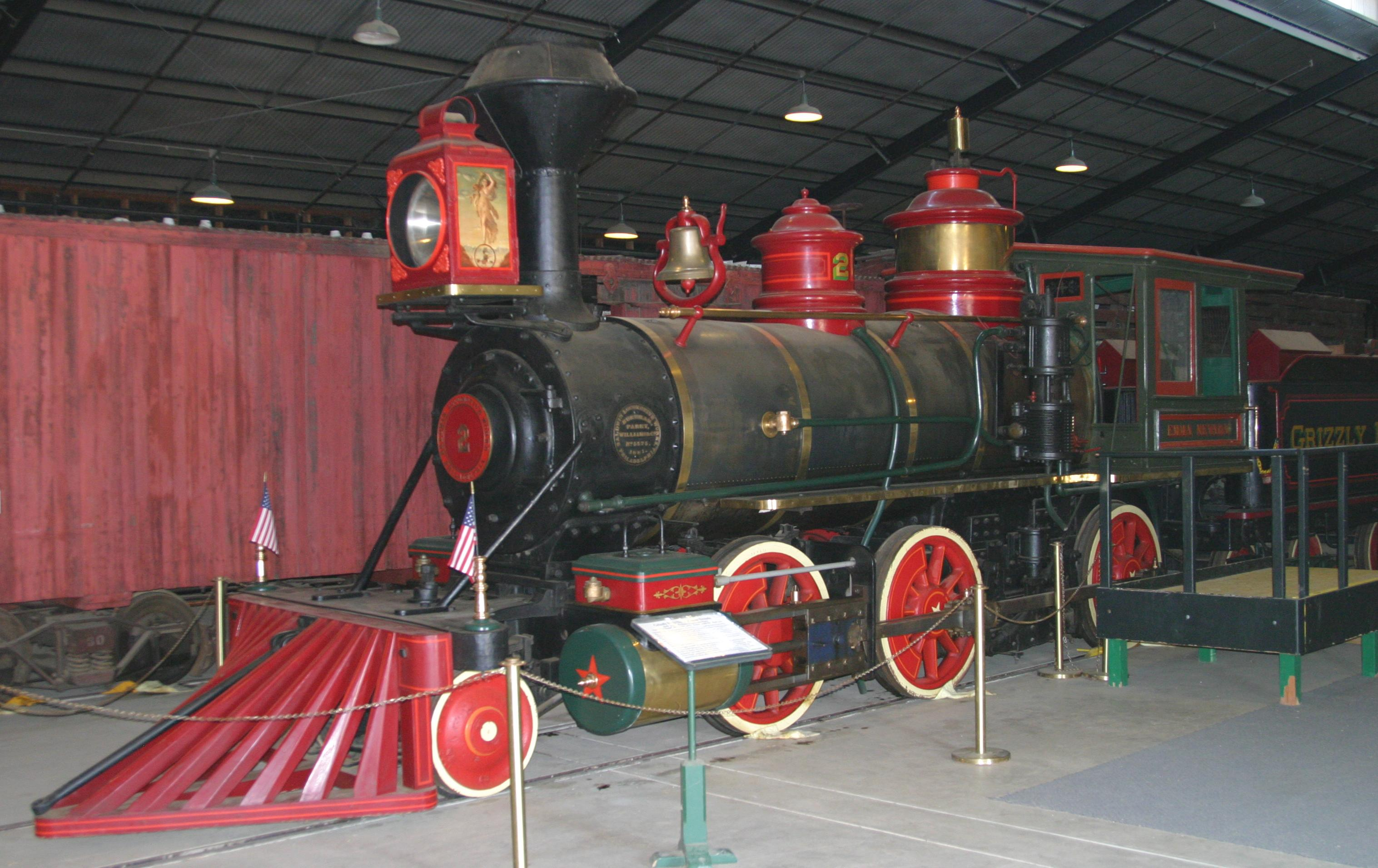
The "Emma Nevada" at the Southern California Railway Museum.

== Sources ==
- De Bekker, L. J., "Nevada, Emma", Stokes Encyclopedia of Music and Musicians, Volume 2, pp. 433–434. Originally published in 1908, published in facsimile by Read Books, 2007. ISBN 1-4067-7179-1
- Encyclopædia Britannica, "Emma Nevada", 2009. Encyclopædia Britannica Online accessed 6 September 2009.
- The New York Times, "Mignon Nevada A Success; Has Scored Big Triumph in Rome as an Operatic Star", 15 March 1908, p. C2.
- Pryor, Alton, Fascinating Women in California History, Stagecoach Publications, 2003, pp. 109–110. ISBN 0-9660053-9-2
- Rosenthal, H. and Warrack, J., "Nevada, Emma", The Concise Oxford Dictionary of Opera, 2nd Edition, Oxford University Press, 1979, pp. 345–346. ISBN 0-19-311321-X
- Watson, Anita Ernst, Into their own: Nevada women emerging into public life, University of Nevada Press, 2000. ISBN 1-890591-06-8,
