= Washington, California =

Washington
- census-designated place
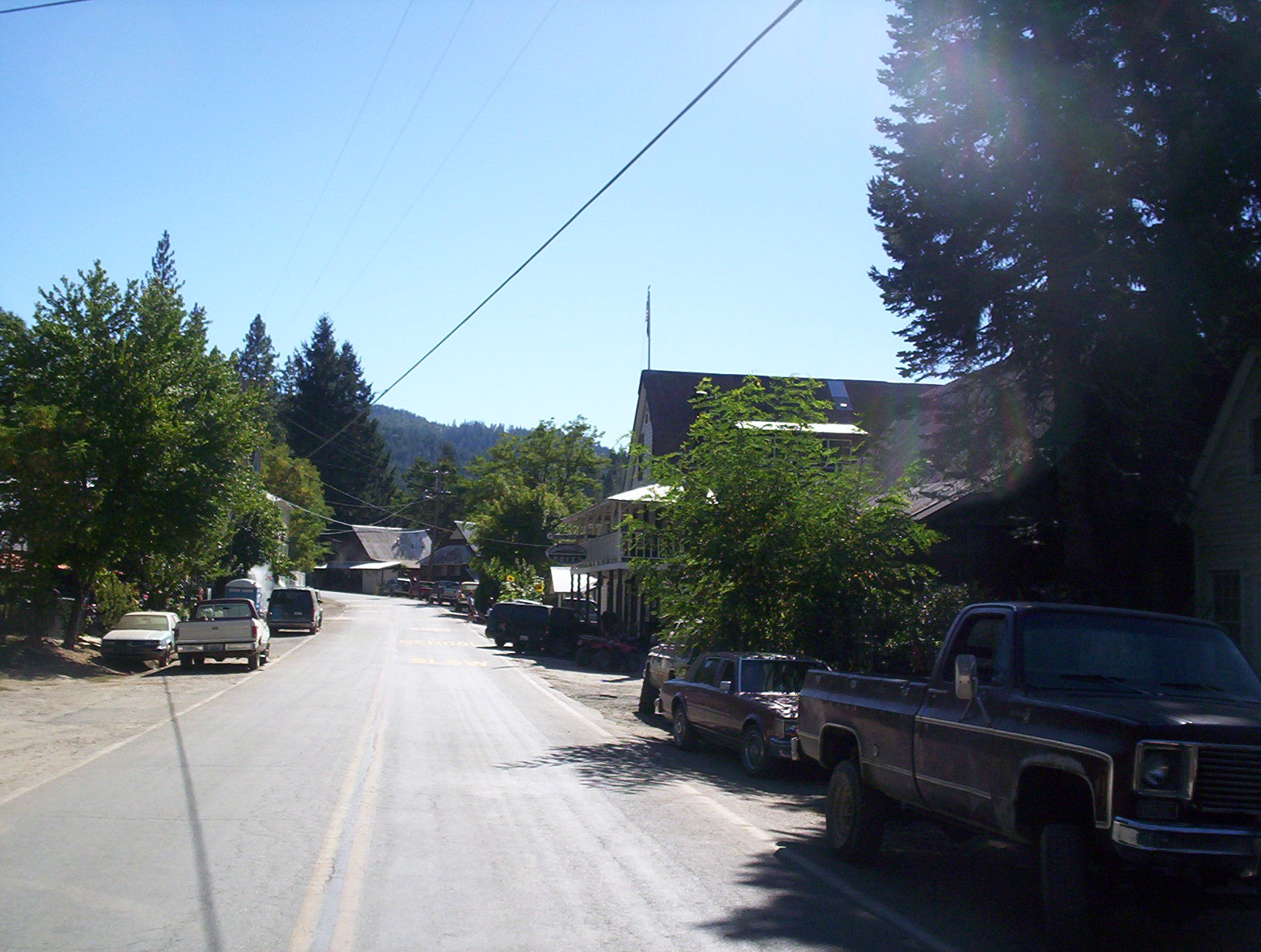
- Main Street in Washington

- Location within the state of California Washington (the United States)
- Coordinates: 39°21′34″N 120°47′53″W
- Country: United States
- State: California
- County: Nevada

Area
  - Total: 1.901 sq mi (4.923 km^{2})
  - Land: 1.901 sq mi (4.923 km^{2})
  - Water: 0 sq mi (0 km^{2}) 0%
- Elevation: 2,612 ft (796 m)

Population (2020)
  - Total: 101
  - Density: 53.1/sq mi (20.5/km^{2})
- Time zone: UTC-8 (Pacific (PST))
  - Summer (DST): UTC-7 (PDT)
- ZIP codes: 95986
- Area codes: 530, 837
- GNIS feature ID: 2628797

Washington (originally, Indiana Camp) is a census-designated place located in Nevada County, California. Washington is located on the banks of the South Yuba River and has a population of approximately one hundred people. There is a hotel/bar and restaurant, grocery store, a one-room schoolhouse that has educated students continuously for one hundred years, and two trailer park campgrounds. The elevation is 2,612 feet (796 m). The population was 185 at the 2010 census. According to the 2020 census, the population was 101 with a median age of 59.9.

The population fluctuates seasonally and the town businesses rely on the tourist trade as the population increases in the summer. It was settled during the California Gold Rush in 1849 and produced a large amount of placer gold. Hard rock mines were established soon afterward and were very productive. Washington is the only settlement in the vicinity to have survived to this day. There remains today much evidence of placer gold mining, hydraulic mining, and hard-rock mining. During the mining period, many Chinese lived there.

Washington's biggest businesses are its two campsites, Little Town Campground (formerly Gene's Pine Aire Campground) and the River Rest, which has been in business since the 1960s through different owners. Filmmaker Sara Ross-Samko is making a feature-length documentary portrait of the town.

The ZIP Code is 95986. The community is inside area code 530.

== History ==
The place was founded in 1849 by miners from Indiana and was originally named Indiana Camp. It was renamed Washington in 1850.

The Washington South Yuba post office operated here from 1852 to 1854. The Washington post office opened in 1862.

== Geography ==
According to the United States Census Bureau, the CDP covers an area of 1.9 square miles (4.9 km^{2}), all of it land.

== Demographics ==
Historical population
Census	Pop.	Note	%±
2010	185		—
2020	101		−45.4%
U.S. Decennial Census; 2010

The 2020 United States census reported that Washington had a population of 101. The population density was 53.1 inhabitants per square mile (20.5/km^{2}). The racial makeup was 97 (96.0%) White, and 4 (4.0%) Native American. No residents were Hispanic or Latino.

There were 53 households, out of which 14 (26.4%) had children under the age of 18 living in them, 13 (24.5%) were married-couple households, 3 (5.7%) were cohabiting couple households, 18 (34.0%) had a female householder with no partner present, and 19 (35.8%) had a male householder with no partner present. 26 households (49.1%) were one person, and 17 (32.1%) were one person aged 65 or older. The average household size was 1.91. There were 26 families (49.1% of all households).

The age distribution was 10 people (9.9%) under the age of 18, 1 person (1.0%) aged 18 to 24, 23 people (22.8%) aged 25 to 44, 25 people (24.8%) aged 45 to 64, and 42 people (41.6%) who were 65 years of age or older. The median age was 59.9 years. There were 57 males and 44 females.

There were 92 housing units at an average density of 48.4 units per square mile (18.7 units/km^{2}), of which 53 (57.6%) were occupied. Of these, 52 (98.1%) were owner-occupied, and 1 (1.9%) was occupied by renters.

== Politics ==
In the state legislature, Washington is in the 1st senatorial district, represented by Republican Megan Dahle, and the 1st Assembly district, represented by Republican Heather Hadwick.

Federally, Washington is in California's 3rd congressional district, represented by Independent Kevin Kiley.

== Education ==
It is in the Twin Ridges Elementary School District and the Nevada Joint Union High School District.

== Notable townspeople ==
- Alice Fong Yu
