= Fire museum =

Type of museum covering firefighting services

Fire museums, also known as firefighting museums, are prevalent throughout the world.

== Australia ==
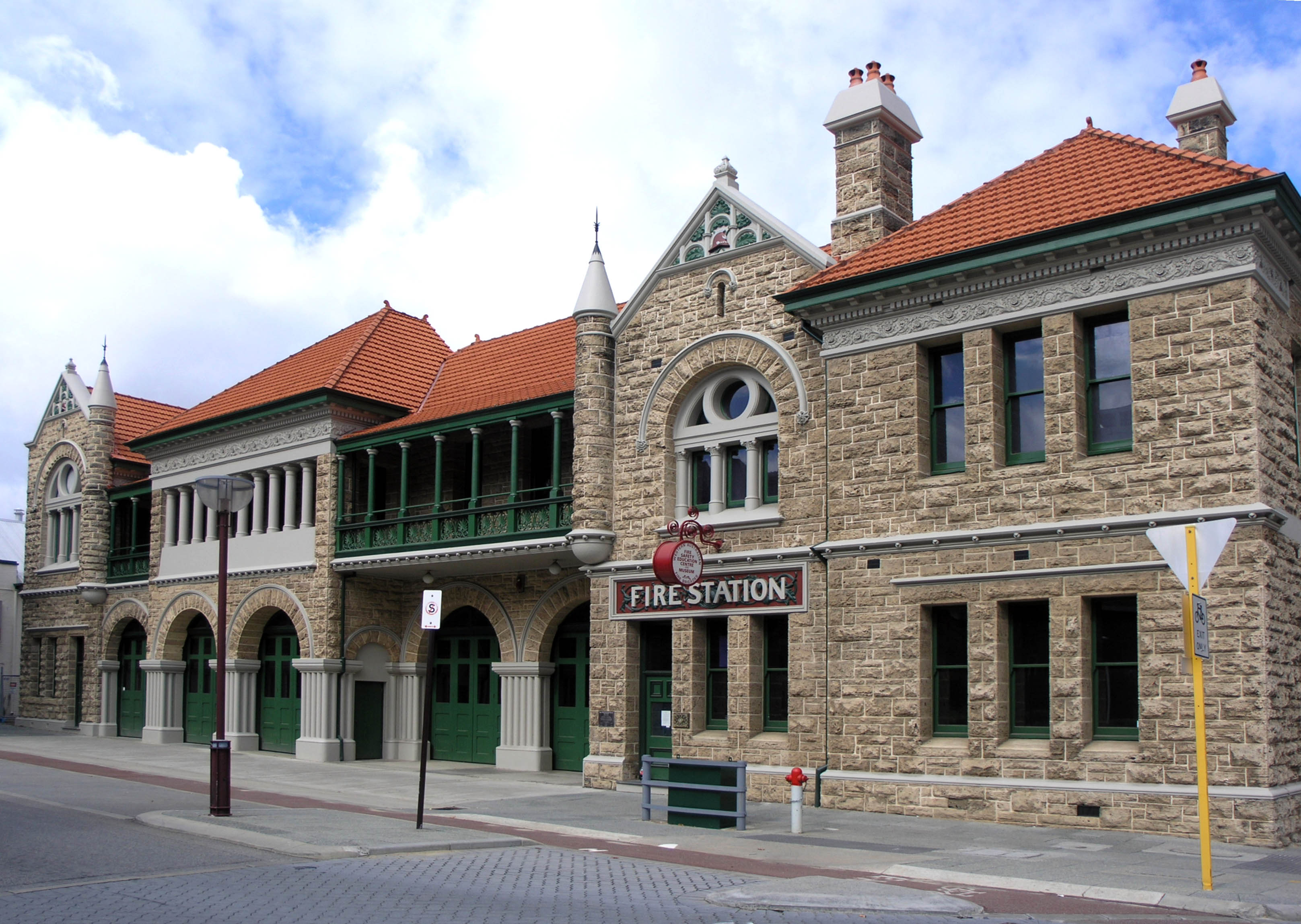
Old Perth Fire Station in Perth, which houses the Fire Safety Education Centre and Museum

Fire museums in Australia include:

- Coolamon Fire Museum, located in Coolamon, New South Wales
- Fire Safety Education Centre and Museum, located in Perth, Western Australia
- Fire Services Museum of Victoria, located in Melbourne, Victoria.
- Penrith Museum of Fire, located in Sydney, New South Wales.

== Canada ==
Fire museums in Canada include:

- Canadian Fire Fighters Museum, located in Port Hope, Ontario.
- Fire Hall Museum & Education Centre, located in Cambridge, Ontario
- Fire Fighters Museum, located in Winnipeg, Manitoba
- Firefighters' Museum of Nova Scotia, located in Yarmouth, Nova Scotia.

== China ==
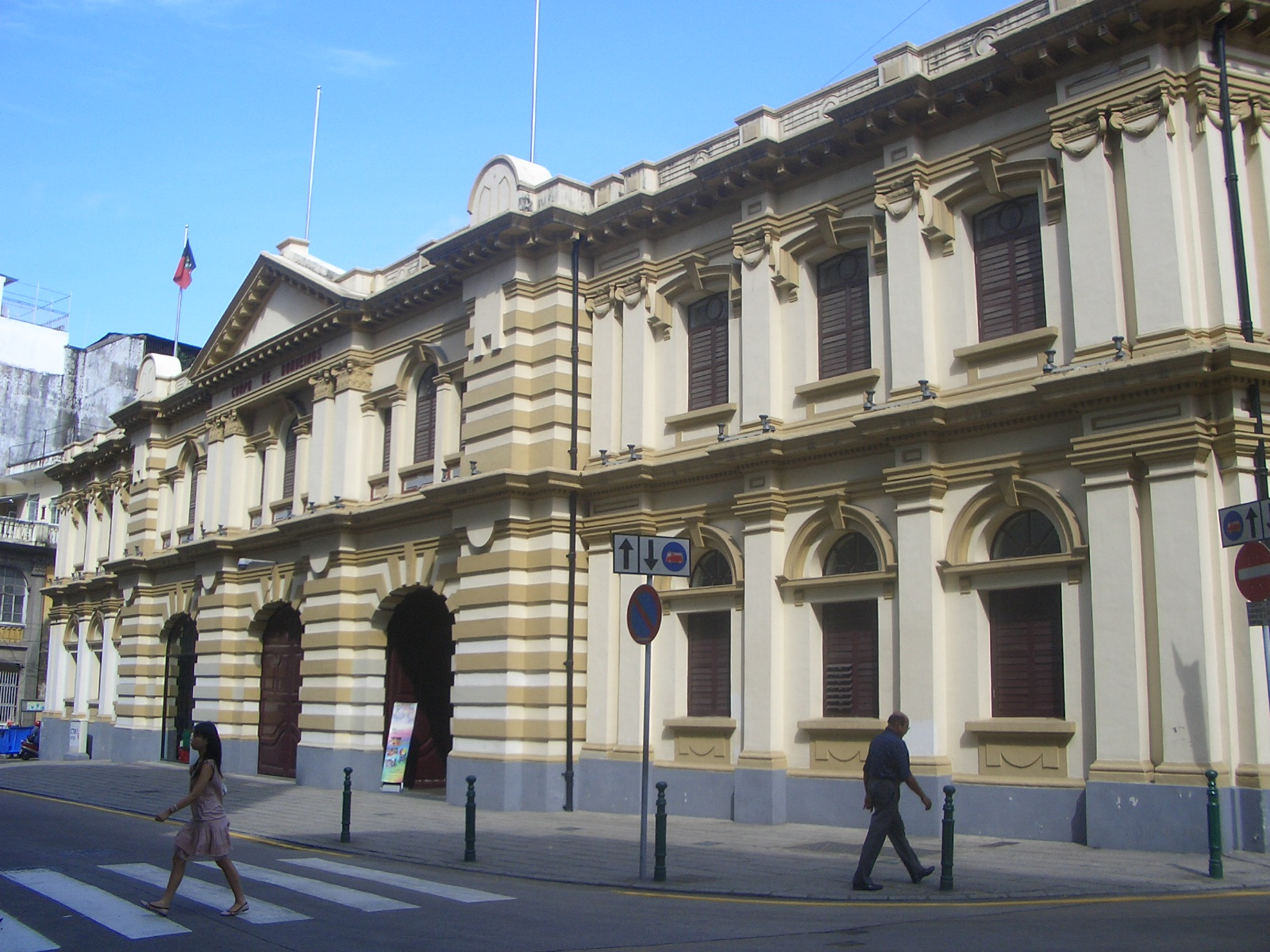
Fire Services Museum in Macau

The Fire Services Museum in Santo António, Macau opened in 1999.

== Denmark ==
Fire museums in Denmark include:

- Brandmuseet, located in Copenhagen
- Brandmuseet, located in Nykøbing Falster
- Dansk Brandværnshistorisk Museum, located in Præstø
- Frederiksværk Brandværnsmuseum, located in Frederiksværk
- Gentofte Brandmuseum, located in Gentofte
- Jysk Brandmuseum, located in Kjellerup
- Nakskov Brandmuseum, located in Nakskov
- Odsherred Brandmuseum, located in Asnæs
- Sønderho Brandmuseum, located in Sønderho

== Estonia ==
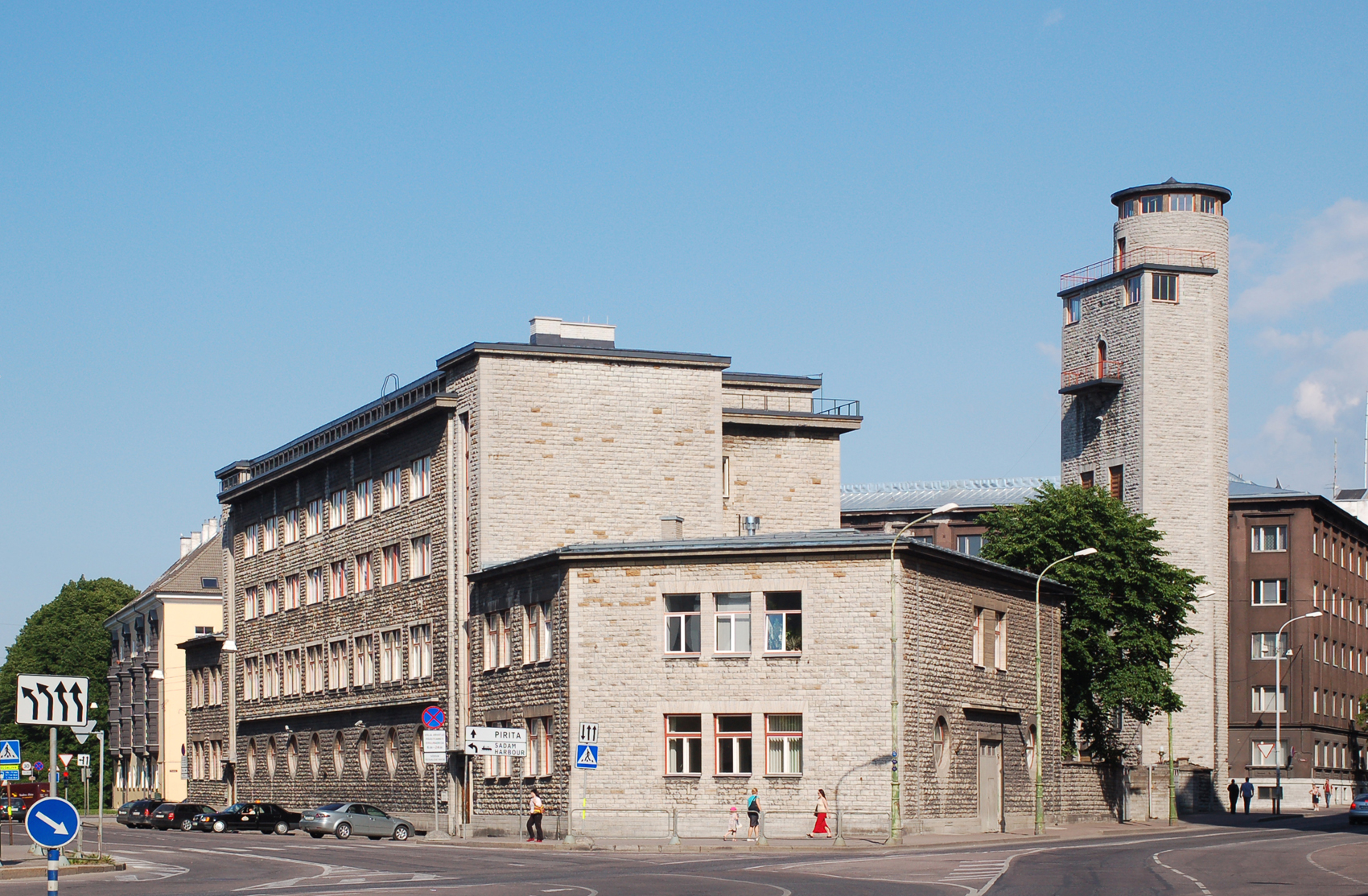
Estonian Firefighting Museum in Tallinn

The Estonian Firefighting Museum in Tallinn was established in 1974.

== Finland ==
The Erottaja Fire Station in Korkeavuorenkatu, Helsinki houses the Helsinki City Rescue Department's Fire Museum.

== France ==
Fire museums in France include:

- Musée des Sapeurs-Pompiers, located in 9th arrondissement, Lyon
- Musée des Sapeurs Pompiers de France, located in Montville, Normandy
- Musée du Sapeur-Pompier d'Alsace, located in Vieux-Ferrette, Alsace
- Musée du Camion de Pompiers, located in Savigny-lès-Beaune, Bourgogne-Franche-Comté

== Ireland ==
The Dublin Fire Brigade has a museum in the O'Brien Institute

== Japan ==
The Yotsuya firefighting station in Shinjuku City houses an extensive museum spread over several floors. The 5th and 4th floors cover the history of firefighting in Tokyo, whereas the 3rd floor is dedicated to modern firefighting. The basement has several historical firefighting vehicles.

== Netherlands ==
Fire museums in the Netherlands include:

- Brandweermuseum, located in Hellevoetsluis, South Holland
- Brandweermuseum Borculo, located in Borculo, Berkelland
- Brandweermuseum Wassenaar, located in Wassenaar, South Holland
- Internationaal Brandweermuseum, located in Rijssen, Overijssel

== Poland ==
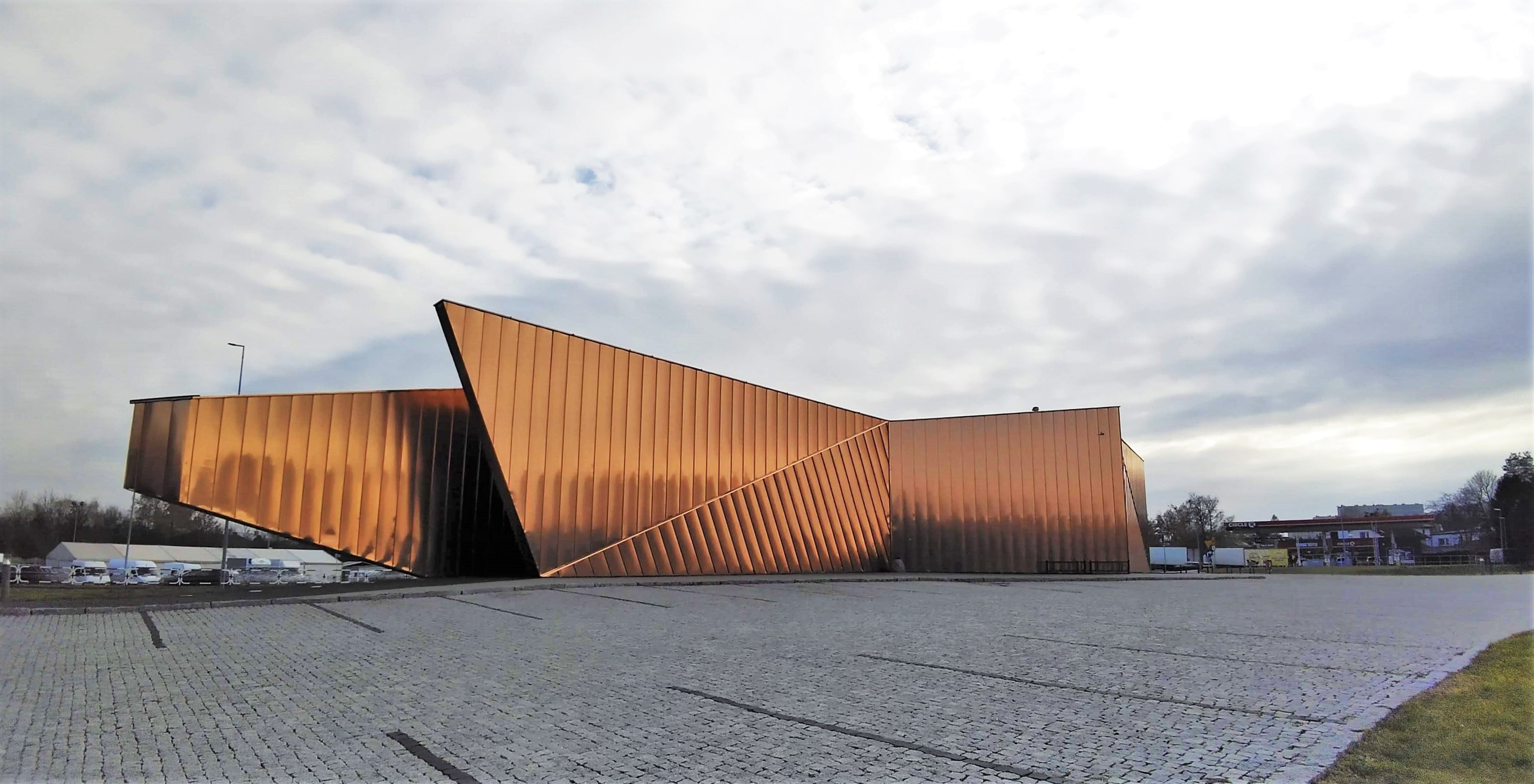
Museum of Fire in Żory

Fire museums in Poland include:

- The Małopolska Museum of Fire Fighting, located in Alwernia
- Museum of Firefighting, located in Kotuń
- Museum of Firefighting, located in Krasnik
- Warmia and Mazury Museum of Firefighting, located in Lidzbark
- Pomeranian Land Fire Fighting Museum, located in Łasin
- Central Museum of Firefighting, located in Myslowice
- Museum of Firefighting of Olkusz Land, located in Olkusz
- Museum of Firefighting, located in Oseredek
- Museum of Firefighting, located in Przeworsk
- Museum of Fire Fighting, located in Przodkowo
- Wielkopolskie Museum of Firefighting, located in Rakoniewice
- Fire Fighting Museum, located in Szczuczyn
- Fire Fighting Museum of TSO, located in Świecie
- Fire Fighting Museum, located in Warsaw
- Fire Fighting Historical and Educational Centre of Lodz Region, located in Wolborz
- Museum of Fire, located in Żory.

== Puerto Rico ==
Museo Parque de Bombas in Ponce, Puerto Rico, founded in 1990, is housed in a structure built in 1882.

== Romania ==
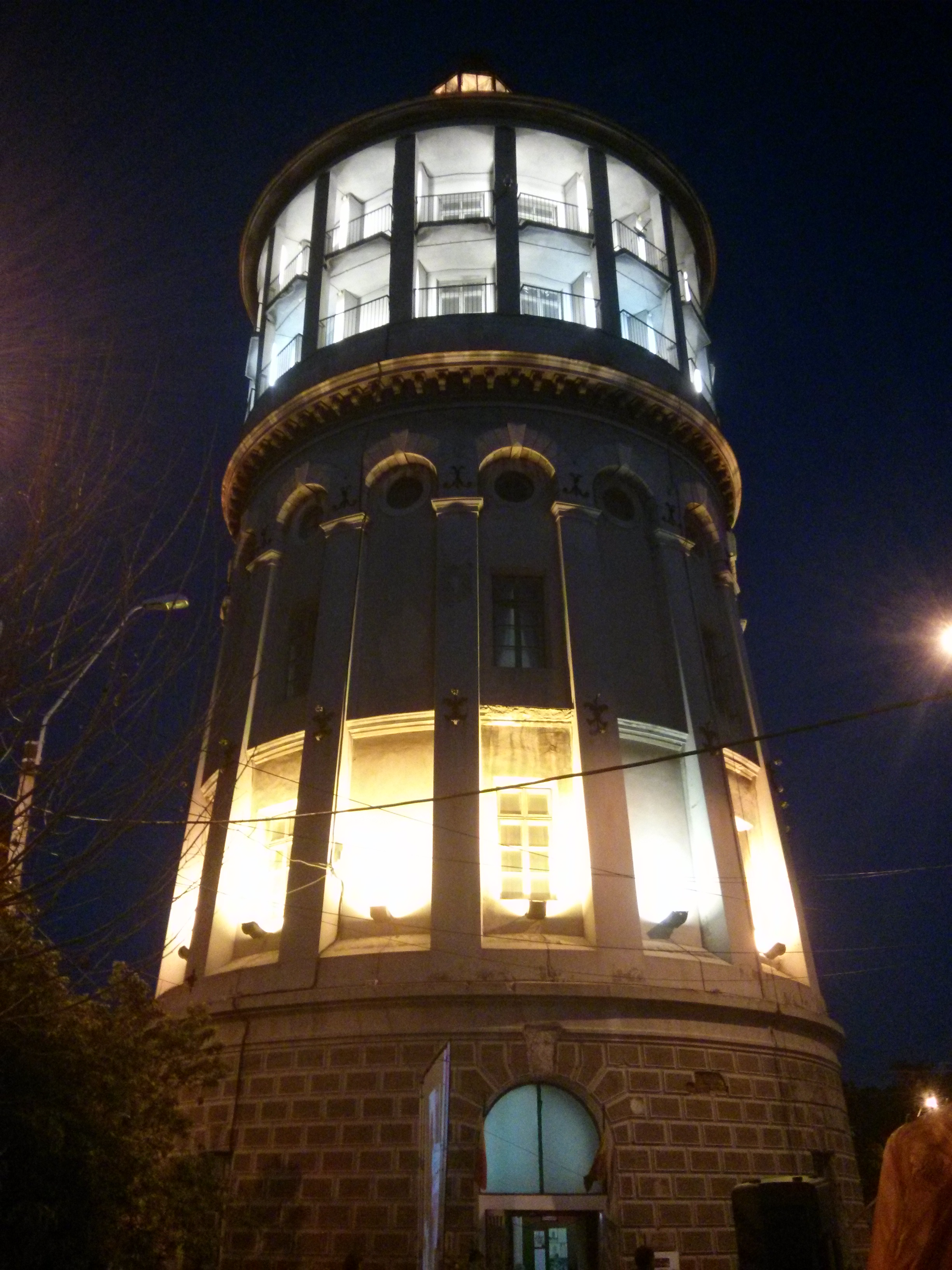
Foișorul de Foc in Bucharest

Foișorul de Foc (named as National Museum of Firefighters) in Bucharest, Romania, founded in 1963 in a fire lookout tower built in 1892.

== Spain ==
The Firefighters Museum of Alcoy is located in Alcoy, Alicante Province.

== Taiwan ==
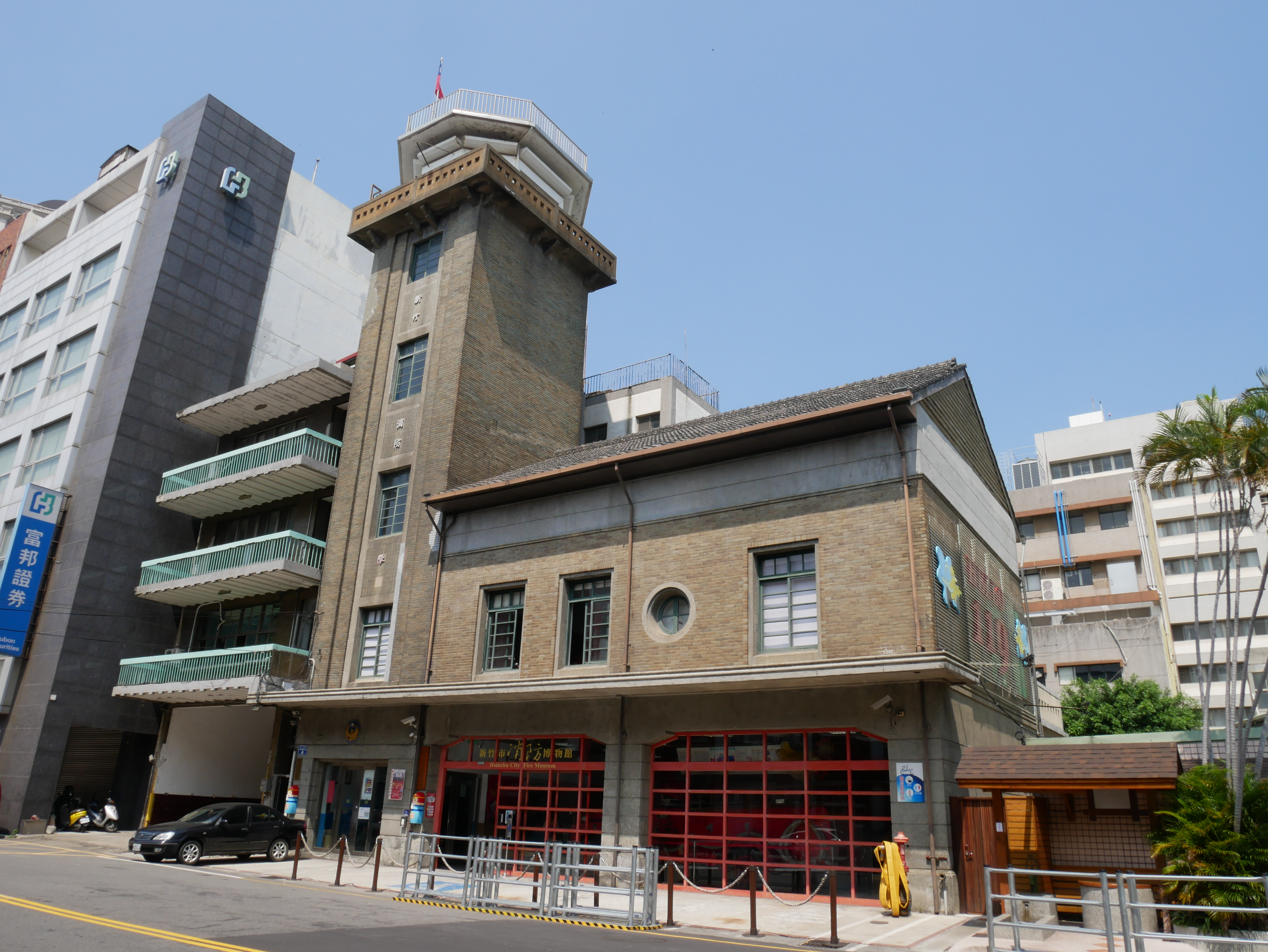
Hsinchu City Fire Museum in Hsinchu

Fire museums in Taiwan include:

- Fire Safety Museum of Taipei City Fire Department, located in Neihu District, Taipei City
- Hsinchu City Fire Museum, located in North District, Hsinchu City.
- Tainan City Fire Museum, located in West Central District, Tainan City

== United Kingdom ==
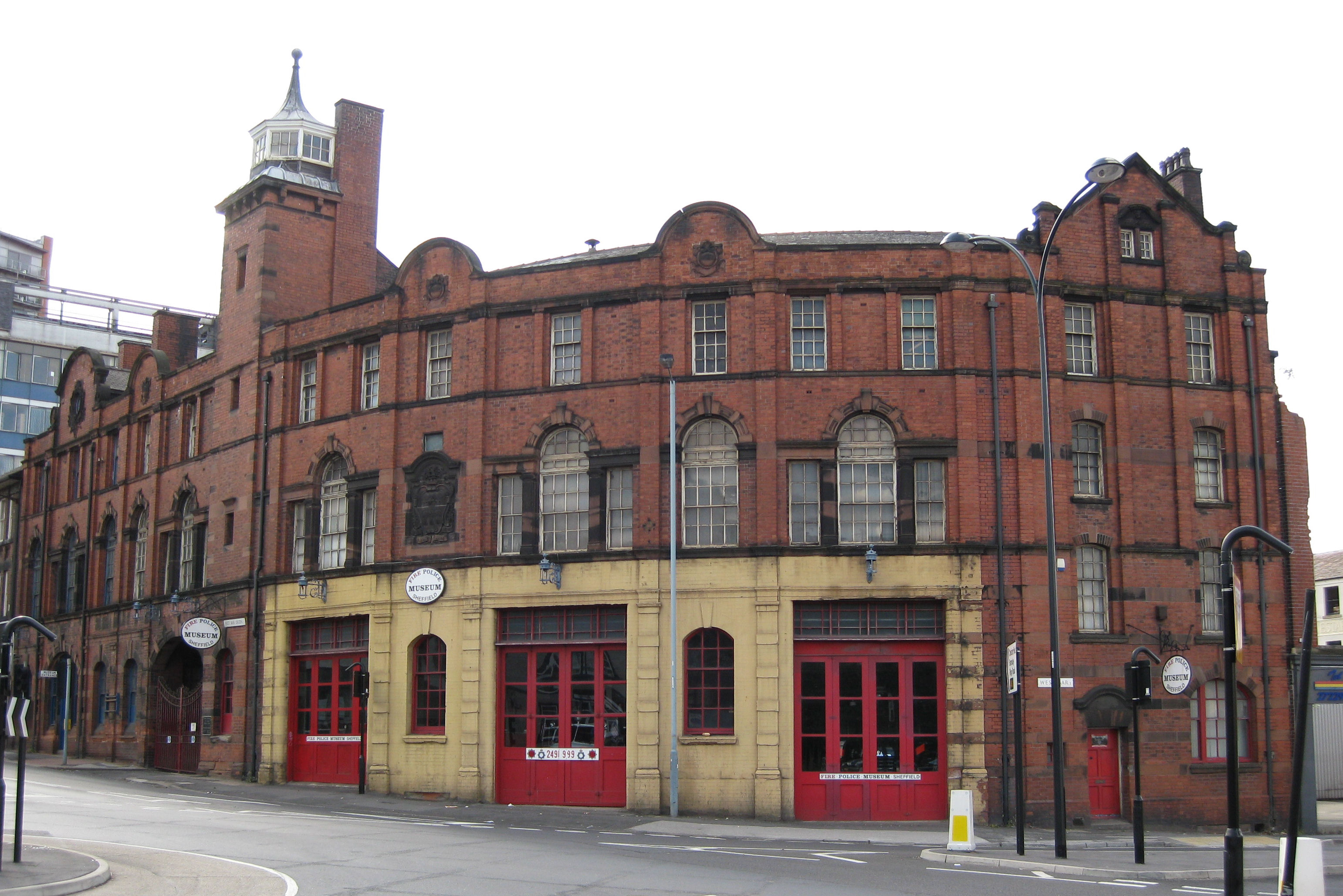
National Emergency Services Museum in Sheffield

Fire museums in the UK include:

=== England ===
- Essex Fire Museum, located in Grays, Essex
- Fire Brigade Museum, located in Romsey, Hampshire
- Fireground, located in Rochdale, Greater Manchester
- Kent Firefighting Museum, located in Sevenoaks, Kent
- London Fire Brigade Museum, located in Lambeth, London
- National Emergency Services Museum, located in Sheffield, South Yorkshire
- Norfolk Fire Museum, located in Great Yarmouth, Norfolk
- Stalham Firehouse Museum, located in Stalham, Norfolk

=== Scotland ===
- Museum of Scottish Fire Heritage, located in Leith, Edinburgh
- Scottish Fire and Rescue Service Museum and Heritage Centre, located in Greenock, Inverclyde

=== Wales ===
- Welsh Museum of Fire, located in Neath, Neath Port Talbot

== United States ==
Fire museums in the US include:

=== Arizona ===
- Hall of Flame Fire Museum

=== California ===
- African American Firefighter Museum
- Los Angeles Fire Department Museum and Memorial
- Plaza Firehouse Museum
- Nevada City Firehouse No. 1
- Nevada City Firehouse No. 2

=== Colorado ===
- Denver Firefighters Museum

=== Connecticut ===
- Connecticut Fire Museum
- Fireboat Fire Fighter Museum, Mystic Seaport, Mystic
- Mystic Seaport Museum Firehouse, Mystic Seaport, Mystic

=== Florida ===
- Jacksonville Fire Museum permanently closed
- Tampa Fire Museum
- Orlando Fire Museum

=== Illinois ===
- Aurora Regional Fire Museum
- Fire Museum of Greater Chicago
- Illinois Fire Museum, Springfield

=== Iowa ===
- International Fire Museum

=== Maine ===
- Hose 5 Fire Museum
- Portland Fire Museum

=== Maryland ===
- Fire Museum of Maryland

=== Massachusetts ===
- Boston Fire Museum
- Falls Fire Barn Museum
- New Bedford Fire Museum

=== Michigan ===
- Michigan Firehouse Museum
- Upper Peninsula Fire Fighters Memorial Museum

=== Minnesota ===
- Hinckley Fire Museum

=== New Jersey ===
- Hoboken Fire Department Museum
- Somerville Fire Department Museum

=== New York ===
- Buffalo Fire Historical Museum
- FASNY Museum of Firefighting, Hudson
- New York City Fire Museum

=== Ohio ===
- Fire Museum of Greater Cincinnati

=== Oklahoma ===
- Oklahoma State Firefighters Museum

=== Oregon ===
- Uppertown Firefighter's Museum

=== Pennsylvania ===
- Pennsylvania National Fire Museum
- Reading Area Fire-Fighters Museum

=== South Carolina ===
- North Charleston Fire Museum

=== Tennessee ===
- Fire Museum of Memphis

=== Texas ===
- Austin Fire Museum
- Fire Museum of Texas
- Houston Fire Museum

== See also ==
- List of fire stations (which includes many fire museums)
