= Museum of the Ecuadorian Fireman =

- Museo del Bombero Ecuatoriano "Jefe Félix Luque Plata"
- Established: July 25, 1982; 44 years ago
- Location: Guayaquil, Ecuador
- Coordinates: 2.182822°S 79.876740°W
- Type: Firefighting museum
- Owner: Guayaquil Fire Department

The Museum of the Ecuadorian Fireman (Full Spanish name: El Museo del Bombero Ecuatoriano "Jefe Félix Luque Plata") or also known as the Museum of the Meritorious Fire Department of Guayaquil (Spanish: Museo del Benemérito Cuerpo de Bomberos de Guayaquil), is a firefighting museum in Guayaquil, Ecuador.

== History ==
On March 12, 1982, the Board of Directors and Discipline unanimously decided that the museum should be named the "Colonel Félix Luque Plata" museum, in honor of the first chief who inaugurated the plant, but the museum as such would not open its doors until its inauguration on July 25, 1982. It retains its original structure from the beginning of the 20th century.
