= Hsinchu City Fire Museum =

Museum in North District, Hsinchu City, Taiwan

- 新竹市消防博物館
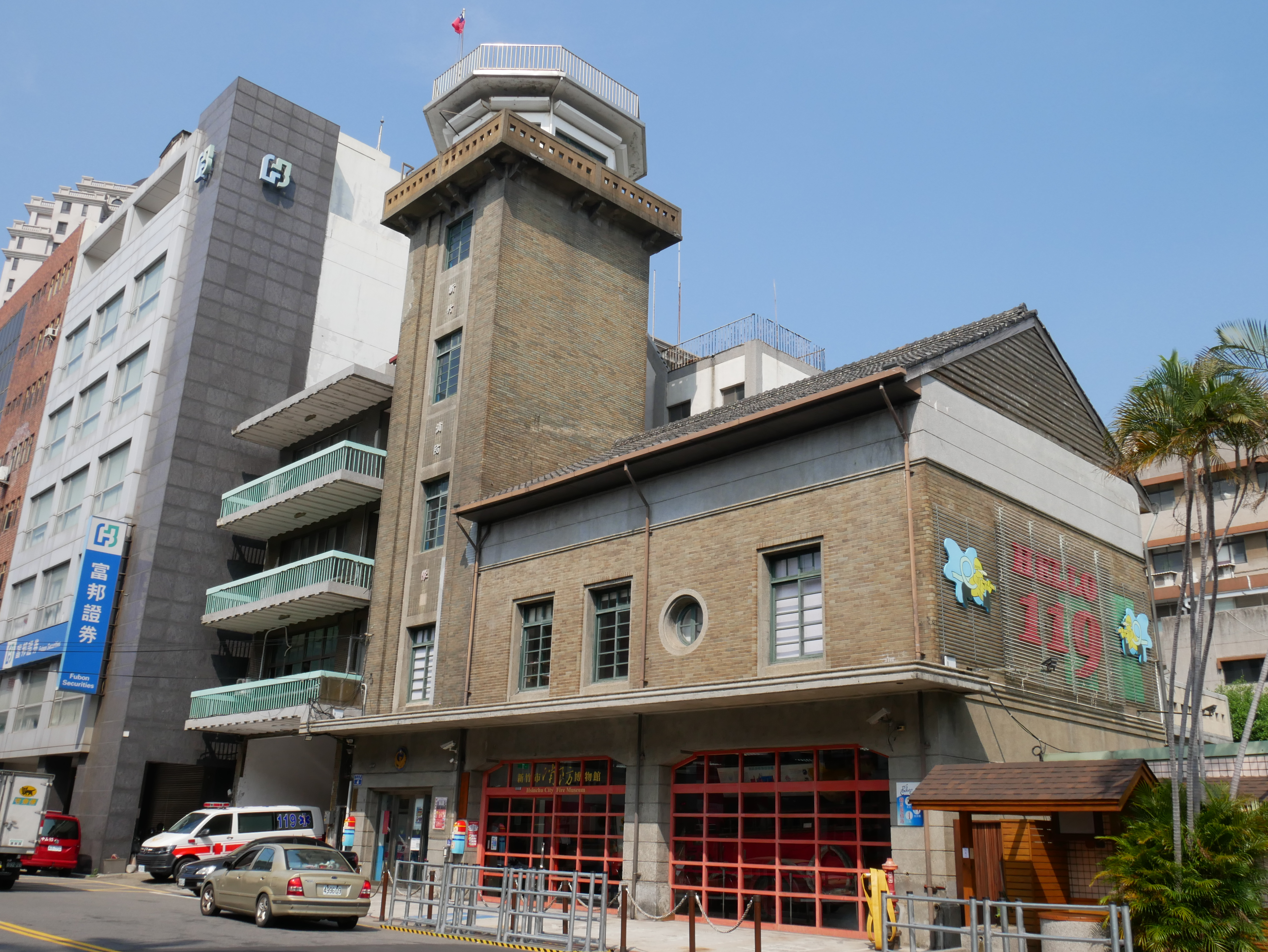
- Established: 7 June 2002
- Location: North, Hsinchu City, Taiwan
- Coordinates: 24°48′23″N 120°58′05″E
- Type: museum

The Hsinchu City Fire Museum (traditional Chinese: 新竹市消防博物館; simplified Chinese: 新竹市消防博物馆; pinyin: Xīnzhúshì Xiāofáng Bówùguǎn) is a museum about firefighting in North District, Hsinchu City, Taiwan.

== History ==
The museum building was originally built as a fire station in 1937. The building was then converted into a museum in order to preserve the historic value of the fire station as well as to introduce a series of historical and cultural relics related to fire safety. It was opened to the public on 7 June 2002.

== Exhibitions ==
=== First floor ===
- Service Counter
- Exhibition Hall
- Area of Fire Fighting
- Area of Fire System
- Area of Escape Experiences

=== Second floor ===
- Exhibition Hall
- Display of Ignition Sources
- Multimedia Area
- Dynamic Exhibitions of Life Saving Models

== Transportation ==
The museum is accessible within walking distance northwest from Hsinchu Station of the Taiwan Railway.

== See also ==
- List of museums in Taiwan
- Fire museum
