= Museum of Scottish Fire Heritage =

Museum in Edinburgh, Scotland

- Established: 1968
- Location: Leith, Edinburgh, Scotland
- Coordinates: 55°57′49″N 3°11′02″W
- Type: Heritage centre
- Owner: Scottish Fire and Rescue Service
- Public transit access: Lothian Buses, Edinburgh Trams
- Parking: Dryden Terrace (On-street parking)
- Website: museumofscottishfireheritage.org

The Museum of Scottish Fire Heritage is a museum of firefighting located at the McDonald Road Community Fire Station in Leith, Edinburgh. It covers the history of firefighting in Scotland and houses old fire appliances and other equipment.

== History ==
The museum first opened as the Braidwood and Rushbrook Museum in 1968. It was housed in the former engine room of the Auxiliary Fire Service at the McDonald Road Fire Station.

In 1985, the museum was relocated to the former engine room of the Lauriston Place Fire Station. It was renamed to the Edinburgh Museum of Fire and it remained there until 2016, when the building was purchased by the University of Edinburgh.

The collection was then moved into storage, whilst a new location was under development. It was decided that the museum would return to its original home at McDonald Road. In April 2022, 5 appliances were moved to the new exhibition gallery. The museum opened in 2023 as the Museum of Scottish Fire Heritage.

== Exhibits ==
The museum is split across five themes, showing the evolution of firefighting throughout Scotland.

=== Scotland's Challenges ===
Scotland's firefighters have faced many challenges, shaped by our history, our industry and our landscape. This section includes:

- Speaking our language

=== Heritage ===
Scotland became the home of modern firefighting after Edinburgh set up the first municipal fire service in 1824. This section includes:

- Early Days
- Duns Fire Appliance
- James Braidwood
- Manual Pump Appliance

=== On the Run ===
Firefighters share a common goal - to get to a fire quickly with the best equipment to help them fight a fire and stay as safe as possible. This section includes:

- Fire Service Horses
- Greenwich Gem Appliance
- Halley Appliance
- Communications
- Uniforms
- Equipment
- Dennis Limo Appliance

=== Being a Firefighter ===
Firefighting is a demanding, exciting and varied job - whether firefighters are full-time, retained or volunteers. This section includes:

- Viewing Gallery
- Training
- Canine Crews
- Firefighting Family
- A Dangerous Job

=== Your Safety ===
Advice about tackling and preventing fires at home has changed as technology and our lives have changed. This section includes:

- Safety
- Temporary Exhibition

== Collection ==
A complete list of the appliances present in the museum gallery is below:

Date	Description	Notes
1806	Duns Fire Appliance	Manufactured by Bristow & Sons, London
1824	Manual Pump Appliance	Manufactured by Tilley & Co, London
1901	Greenwich Gem Appliance	Manufactured by Merryweather, London
1910	Halley Appliance	Manufactured by Halley, Yoker
1939	Dennis Limo Appliance	Manufactured by Dennis, Surrey

== See also ==
- Fire museum
- Scottish Fire and Rescue Service
