= Buffalo Fire Historical Museum =

Coordinates: 42.884942°N 78.802255°W

The Buffalo Fire Historical Museum is located in Buffalo, New York at William and North Ogden Streets. Established and staffed by retired members of the Buffalo Fire Department, the museum seeks to preserve the history of the BFD since its inception in the mid-to-late 19th century. Exhibits include photos of historic Buffalo Fire apparatus, several pieces of apparatus including an Ahrens-Fox pumper, and a horse-drawn steamer.

Also included are pictures, accounts, and artifacts from the December 27, 1983 North Division Street explosion that killed five firefighters, two civilians, destroyed about a million in fire equipment, and leveled several city blocks, as well as the infamous fire alarm box # 29 also known as the Hoodoo Box. It was so called because whenever this particular box, located at Seneca and Wells streets in Buffalo, New York was used, the call would usually end up tragic for the Buffalo Fire Department.
