= Pennsylvania National Fire Museum =

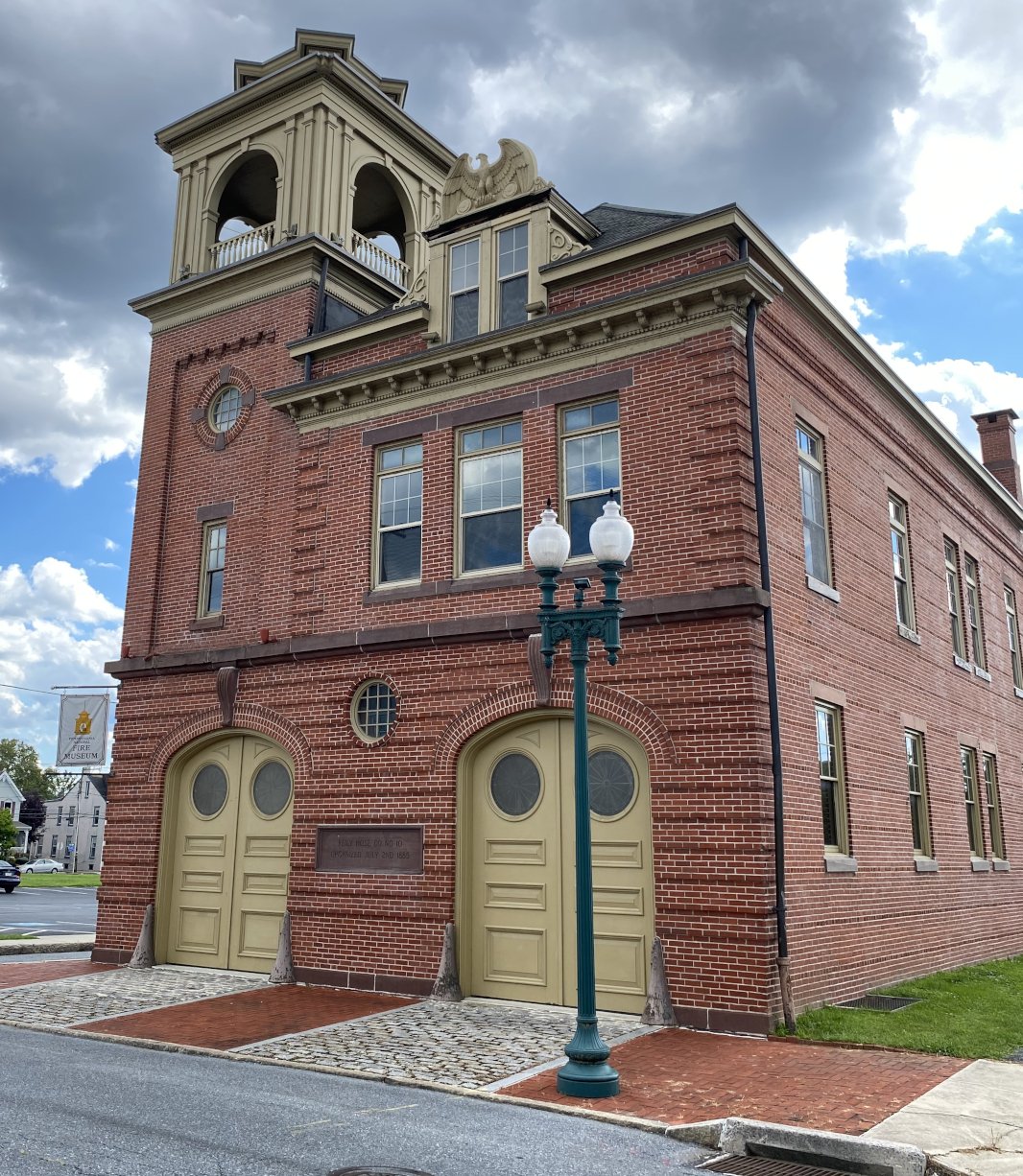
- Pennsylvania National Fire Museum
- Former name: The Fire Museum of Greater Harrisburg
- Established: 1993
- Location: 1820 North 4th Street Harrisburg, Pennsylvania 17102
- Coordinates: 40.2764°N 76.8923°W
- Type: Fire museum
- Director: Kevin Gill
- Website: Museum website

The Pennsylvania National Fire Museum is a museum devoted to fire fighter heritage in Harrisburg, Pennsylvania, United States. The museum has a collection of artifacts from the hand-drawn equipment, vintage fire apparatus, pictures, and information about the history of fire fighting in Pennsylvania and throughout the United States.

The museum is housed in the former 1899 Victorian firehouse Reily Hose Company No. 10, of the Harrisburg Bureau of Fire. After being sold in 1980 and subsequently falling into disrepair, the firehouse was purchased in 1993 and renovated as accurately possible and an added wing in the rear was added for additional exhibit room. It formally opened in 1995 and by its 10 year anniversary, the Museum was considered to be in the top five in the nation, as ranked by the Fire Museum Network.
