= Firefighters' Museum of Nova Scotia =

Museum in Canada

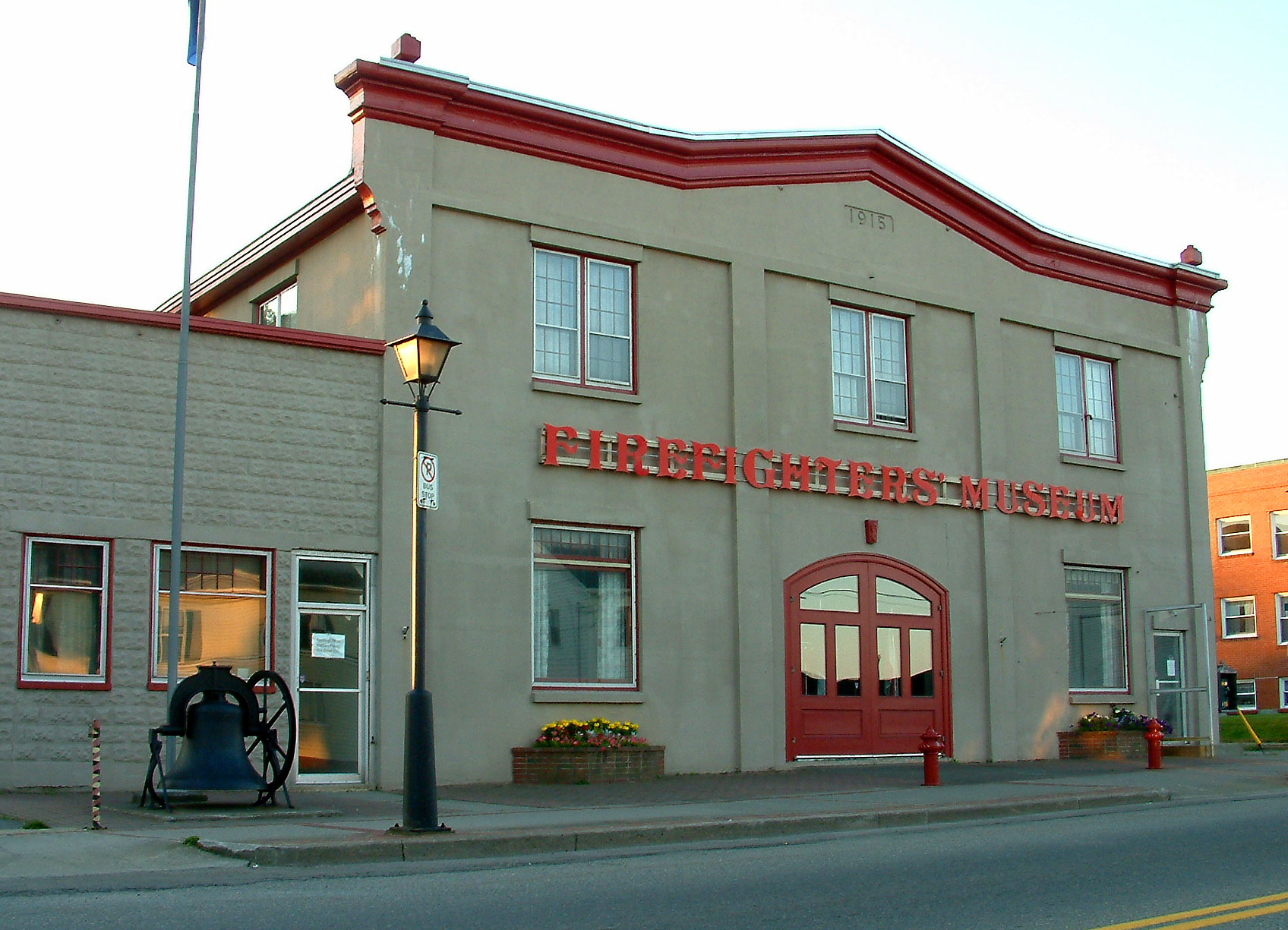
- The museum in 2007
- Established: 1962
- Location: Yarmouth, Nova Scotia, Canada
- Coordinates: 43.8403986°N 66.1189073°W
- Type: Firefighting museum
- Website: firefightersmuseum.novascotia.ca

The Firefighters' Museum of Nova Scotia is the provincial firefighting museum of the Canadian province of Nova Scotia. Located in Yarmouth, the museum features an extensive collection of firefighting artifacts and vehicles spanning three centuries. Established in 1962, the museum became the official firefighting museum of Nova Scotia in 1968.

== History ==
The Firefighters' Museum of Nova Scotia began taking shape in the early 1920s, when Yarmouth resident Ken Allen started collecting firefighting memorabilia. The museum officially opened in 1962, located in part of the Yarmouth North Fire Station. In 1968, the museum became the official firefighting museum of Nova Scotia, subsequently moving to its own building in 1973, becoming a National Exhibit Centre. The museum started operating on a year-round basis in July 1975.

The Firefighters' Museum celebrated its 50th anniversary in 2024. The same year, a mural was painted in the entrance of the museum by the Yarmouth artist Danielle Mahood.

== Exhibits ==
The Firefighters' Museum has an extensive collection of vintage firefighting equipment dating back three centuries. Some equipment housed in the museum includes an 1819 Hopwood and Tilley hand-drawn hand pumper, leather hoses and fire buckets, badges, and brass lanterns. The museum features a variety of firefighting vehicles, including a 1922 Ford Model T hose truck, a 1935 Chevrolet-Bickle, and an 1863 Amoskeag Steamer, the oldest horse-drawn steam engine in Canada. The museum is open to the public year-round.

== Publications ==
- Goodwin, Helen (1977). The Circus Ship Fire. Nova Scotia Museum. Yarmouth, N.S.: Firefighters' Museum of Nova Scotia. OCLC 13147975.

== See also ==
- List of museums in Nova Scotia
