= North Charleston Fire Museum =

- Location in South Carolina Location in United States
- Established: 2007
- Location: 4975 Centre Pointe Dr, North Charleston, SC 29418
- Coordinates: 32.8707°N 80.0184°W
- Type: Fire Museum
- Website: northcharlestonfiremuseum.org

The North Charleston Fire Museum and Educational Center is a fire museum in North Charleston, South Carolina, displaying a collection of fire fighting vehicles dating back to the 1780s.

On permanent loan from the American LaFrance Company, which was headquartered nearby until its closure in 2014, the 20,000 square feet (1,900 m^{2}) facility displays more than 20 restored vehicles, interactive exhibits and simulators.

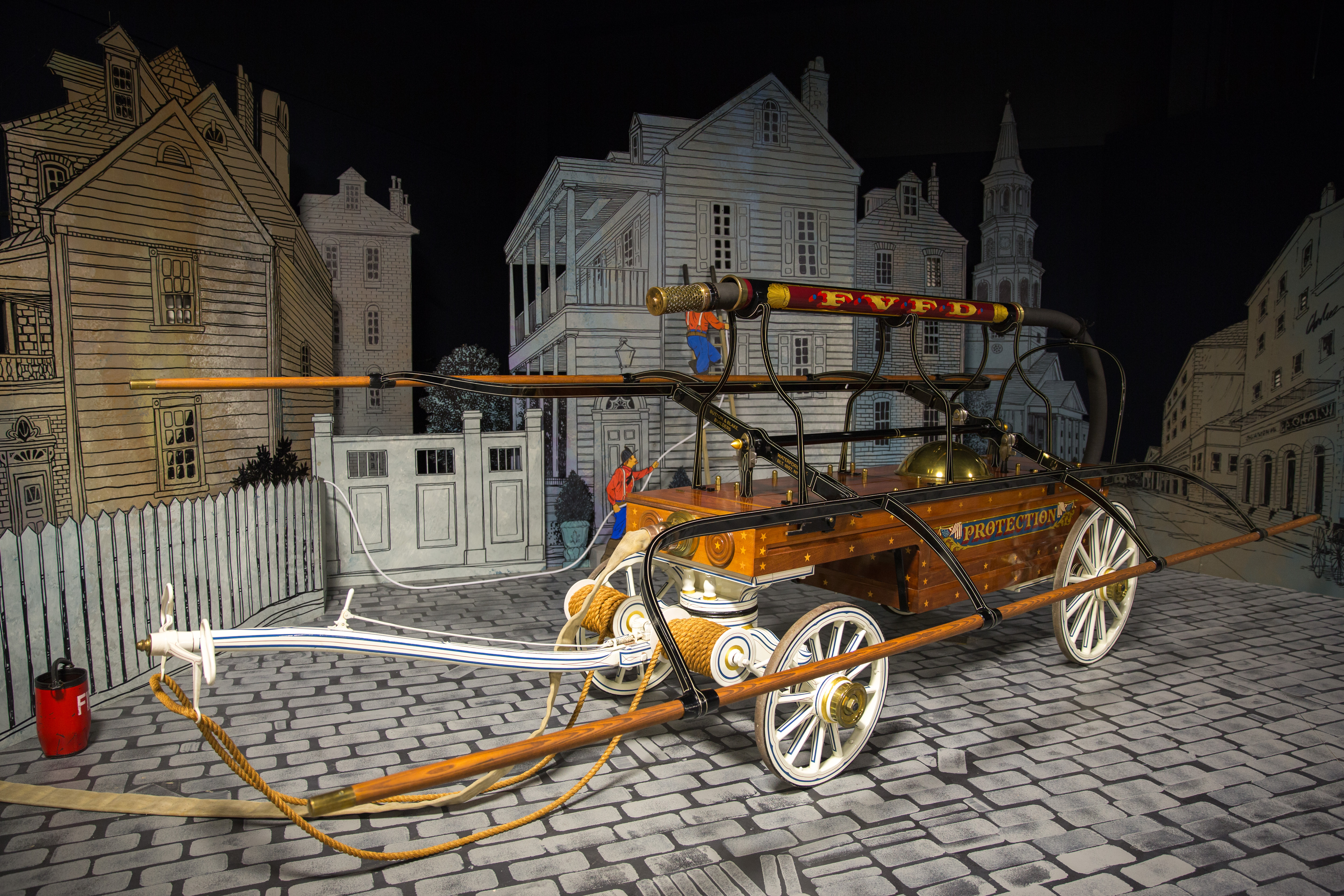
Old apparatus on display at the museum

Established in 2007 by the city of North Charleston, the museum is a popular rainy day activity for tourists.

Retired and active firefighters from the area provide tours for groups and area available to answer questions about the equipment and fire safety. Other exhibits include a 4-D film on the history of firefighting, robotic presentation on fire dangers in the home and a small playground area with a fire-pole and slide.

The Fire Museum is a stop on the route for some shuttle buses that operate between Charleston and its airport.
