= Fire Museum of Greater Cincinnati =

- Court Street Firehouse
- U.S. National Register of Historic Places
- Cincinnati Local Historic Landmark
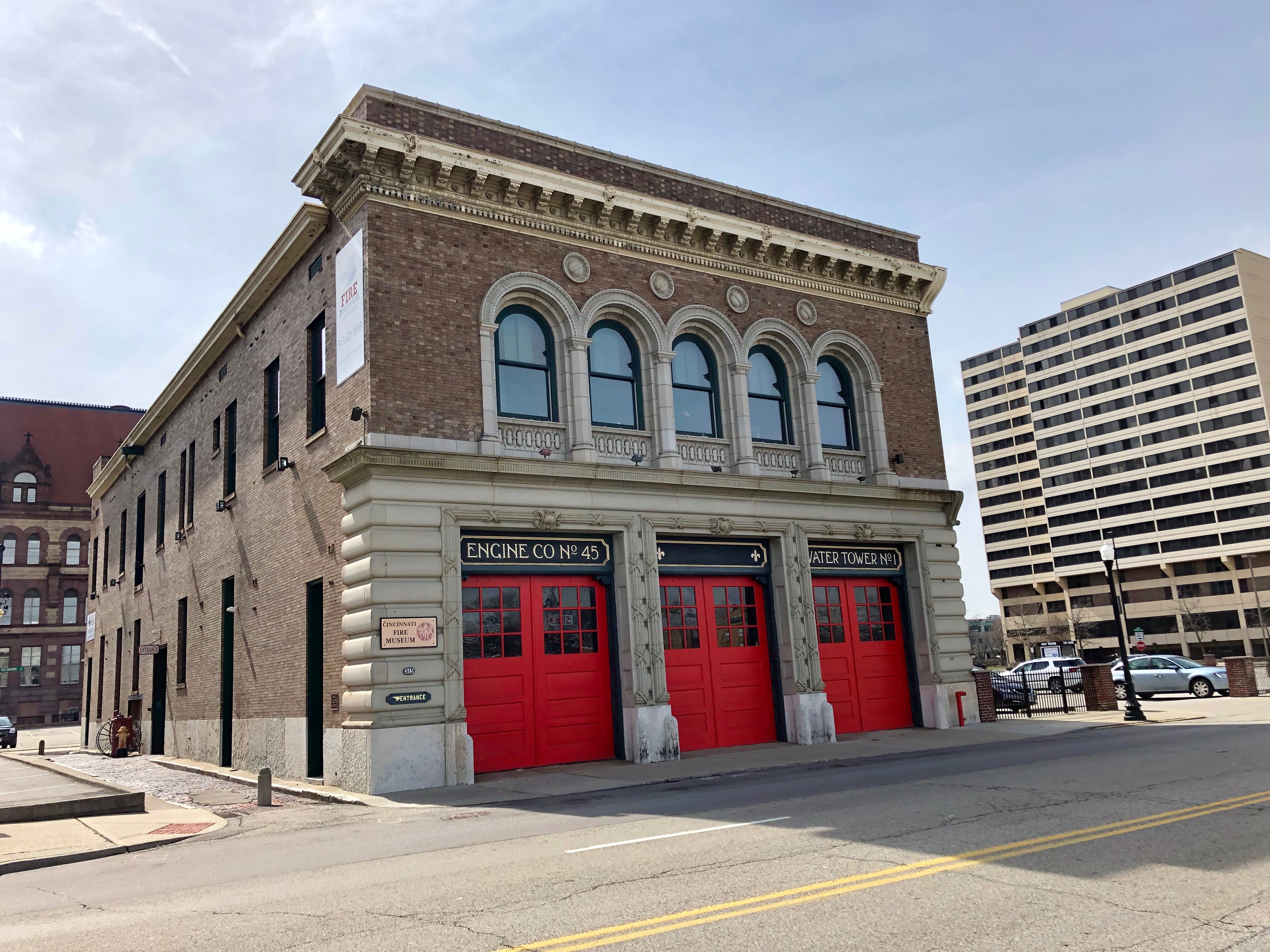
- Main facade

- Location within Ohio Location within the United States
- Location: 311 W. Court St., Cincinnati, Ohio
- Coordinates: 39°6′19″N 84°31′10″W
- Area: less than one acre
- Built: 1906
- Architectural style: Renaissance
- NRHP reference No.: 74001510
- Added to NRHP: July 18, 1974

The Fire Museum of Greater Cincinnati, also known as the Cincinnati Fire Museum, preserves and exhibits Greater Cincinnati, Ohio's firefighting artifacts and honors firefighters, both past and present.

Over 200 years of firefighting history is on display in the Fire Museum of Greater Cincinnati. Exhibits include examples of early leather fire buckets, an 1808 fire drum, the oldest surviving fire engine in Cincinnati, and an 1836 hand pumper. The museum also features and interactive exhibit that allows visitors to experience a modern Emergency-One fire engine cab by wailing the siren, ringing the bell, and flashing the lights.

== Court Street Firehouse ==
The fire museum is housed in the restored 1906 Court Street Firehouse at 315 West Court Street (near Plum Street in Downtown Cincinnati). The firehouse was part of the Cincinnati Fire Department. The Court Street Firehouse is a registered historic building, listed in the National Register on July 18, 1974.
