= 1983 Buffalo propane explosion =

Gas leak and explosion in New York, US

Coordinates: 42.87947°N 78.85191°W

- Date: December 27, 1983
- Time: 8:23 p.m. (Eastern Time Zone)
- Location: Buffalo, New York, U.S.
- Type: Gas explosion
- Cause: Propane leak
- Deaths: 7
- Injuries: ~150

On the evening of December 27, 1983, firefighters in Buffalo, New York responded to a call regarding a propane gas leak. Shortly after their arrival, the propane ignited, leveling a warehouse and causing a wide swath of damage. Five firefighters and two civilians were killed in the blast and dozens more injured. The event remains the largest single day loss of life for the Buffalo Fire Department.

== Explosion ==
At 20:23 hours, the Buffalo (NY) Fire Department responded to a reported propane leak in a four-story radiator warehouse located to the corner of North Division and Grosvenor streets. This building was a combination of Type III ordinary and Type IV heavy timber construction that was approximately 50 feet by 100 feet. Engine 32 was the first to arrive on scene and reported nothing showing. Shortly after Truck 5, Engine 1, and the Third Battalion arrived. Battalion Chief Supple assumed incident command.

Thirty-seven seconds after the chief announced his arrival, the propane tank detonated. The explosion leveled the four-story building and demolished other structures within a four-block radius. Seriously damaged buildings were noted over a half a mile away. The ensuing fireball ignited buildings on a number of streets. A large gothic church on the next block had a huge section ripped out. A ten-story housing project several hundred feet away had every window broken. Engine 32 and Truck 5's firehouse, which was a half mile away from the explosion, had all its windows shattered.

The force of the blast threw Ladder 5, an aerial tiller, nearly 35 feet into the front yard of a dwelling, instantly killing all five crew members (firefighters Mike Austin, Mickey Catanzaro, Red Lickfeld, Tony Waszkielewicz, and Matty Colpoys). Two civilians, Alfred and Jessie Arnold, were also killed as they sat in their living room of their home, which neighbored the warehouse. Engine 1 was thrown across the street, injuring the captain and driver inside the cab and pinning them inside among burning debris. Engine 32 was slammed against the warehouse, and buried in rubble. Eleven firefighters were injured in the initial blast, several of them critically. During the rescue efforts, 19 more firefighters were injured as a result of the adverse weather conditions. Over 150 civilians were transported to hospitals for injuries suffered in the explosion and many more were treated at the scene.

== Cause ==
After an investigation, it was found the warehouse was housing an illegal 500 gallon propane tank. An employee was attempting to move the tank to another part of the warehouse when it slipped off the forklift, breaking the valve. The leaking gas filled the entire structure with propane and the gas found an unknown ignition source.

== Memorial ==
There is now a memorial at fire call box 191 at the intersection of where the tragedy occurred. Each year on December 27, at 20:20 hours, the Fire Department rings out the alarm 1-9-1 to honor the five firefighters of Ladder 5.
