= Nevada City Firehouse No. 1 =

- U.S. Historic district – Contributing property
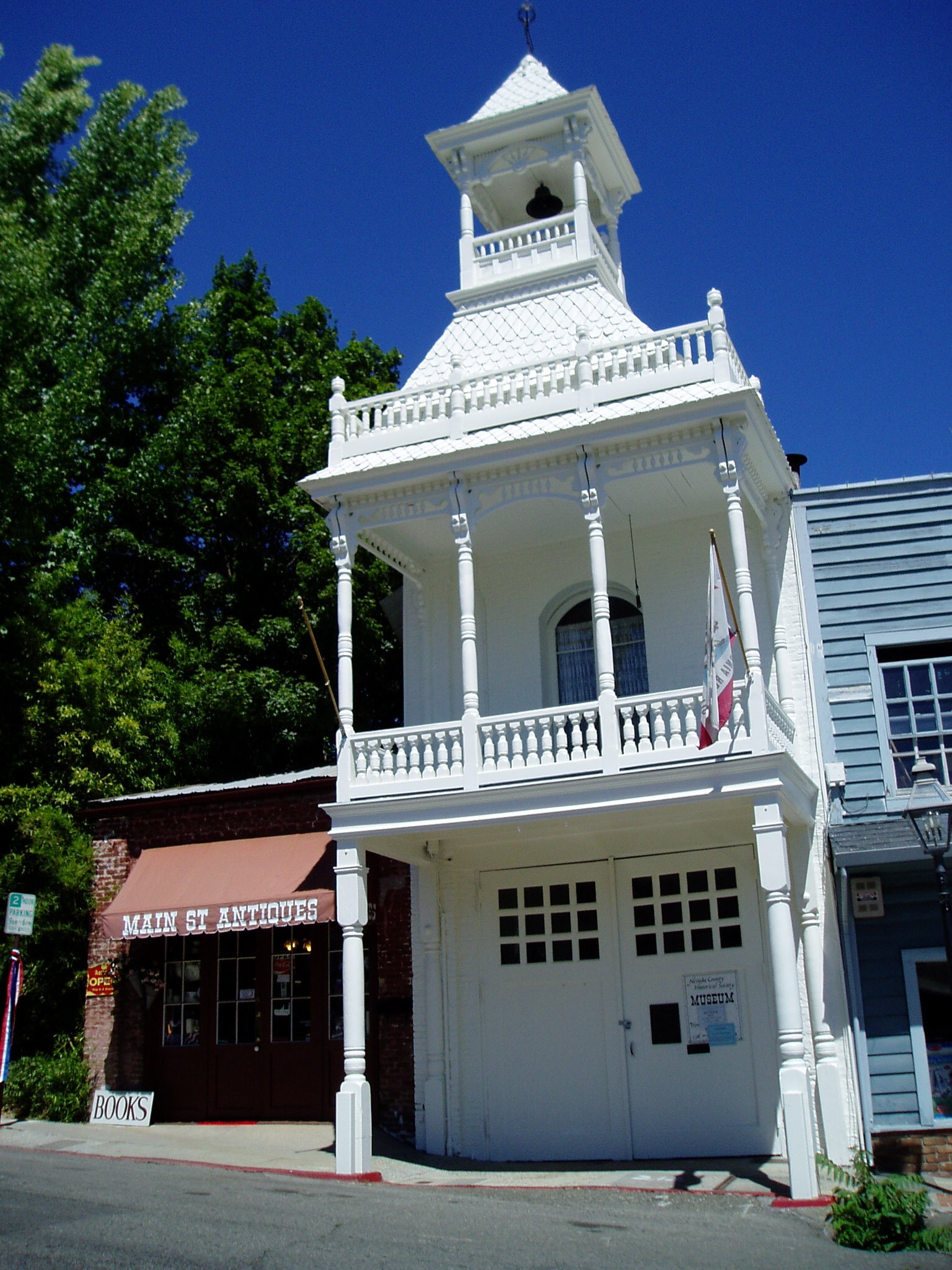
- The firehouse in 2008

- Location within California Location within the United States
- Location: 214 Main Street, Nevada City, California
- Coordinates: 39.2635°N 121.0172°W
- Built: 1861
- Architectural style: originally Greek Revival, now Victorian/Eastlake movement
- Part of: Nevada City Downtown Historic District (ID85002520)
- Designated CP: September 23, 1985

Nevada City Firehouse No. 1 is a historic former firehouse located at 214 Main Street in Nevada City, California. Completed in May 1861 as the city's second firehouse (Nevada City Firehouse No. 2 was the first), it is considered a symbol of the city and "probably the most-photographed building in the entire California Gold Rush country."

Closed in 1938, the building reopened in 1947 as Firehouse No. 1 Museum or simply Firehouse Museum. The museum covers Nevada County history from the late 19th to early 20th century.

== History ==
Nevada City was California's most important mining town during the California gold rush, and by March 1850, it was the third largest city in the state. The first great fire that leveled Nevada City occurred in 1851, and by 1859, the city had been rebuilt and re-leveled by fire four additional times. In December 1859, the women of the city decided to act; on December 26, they raised $923.50 ($33,092 in 2025) from a ball and a week later they raised $149 ($5,339 in 2025) from a theatrical show, all of which were to be put towards the construction of a firehouse.

Nevada City Firehouse No. 1 was the second firehouse built in Nevada City. At the time, the city had three groups competing for firehouse funds: the 37- or 47-member Nevada Hose Company on Main Street (organized June 12, 1860), the 34-member Eureka Hose Company on Broad Street (organized June 13, 1860), and the 37-member Protection Hook & Ladder (organized June 23, 1860). While Nevada Hose Company officially organized a day before Eureka Hose Company, Eureka Hose Company was offered the money raised by the women in the city, allowing them to complete Nevada City Firehouse No. 2 in January 1861, several months before Nevada Hose Company completed Nevada City Firehouse No. 1.

Nevada City Firehouse No. 1 was completed on May 30, 1861 and was home to Nevada Hose Company No. 1 from its completion until the firehouse ceased operations in 1938. The firehouse reopened as a museum in 1947.

In 1968, the firehouse was included by the city of Nevada City in its historic district, where it was mentioned as an example of a building that has "great historical interest and esthetic value", contains "important historical exhibits and unique architectural specimens", and is "symbolic of the City's historical past". In 1985, the firehouse was included as a contributing property in the Nevada City Downtown Historic District, where it was described as "the most photographed building in Nevada City".

The firehouse was overhauled and stabilized in 1988, the work paid for by a grant from the California Department of Parks and Recreation.

== Architecture and design ==
Nevada City Firehouse No. 1 is considered a symbol of Nevada City. The building is two stories, made of brick, and topped by a gabled roof. First-story entry is through two large wood doors, each with twelve small windows near their top. An arched glass door allows entry to the second-story.

Fronting the building is an elaborate Victorian/Eastlake movement double-stacked wood porch. Each stack features balustraded railings and is supported by robust posts, while the porch corners, turns, and projections are decorated with curved brackets, scrolls, and other stylized elements. Numerous spindles are also located along the porch's frieze, while the entire stack is topped by a peaked roof covered in fish-scale shingles, the roof itself topped by a belvedere that is topped by a second fish-scale shingle-peaked roof. A fire bell hangs from the belvedere.

The building originally featured a Greek Revival facade, but this was replaced by the Victorian porch facade in the early twentieth century.

== Firehouse Museum ==
The Firehouse Museum is located inside Nevada City Firehouse No. 1 and covers Nevada County history from the late 19th to early 20th century. The museum groups its displays into four sections: Nisenan Indians of the Nevada City Rancheria, a Chinese display that includes altars from Grass Valley’s Chinatown, Donner Party relics, and Victorian daily-life articles. It is run by the Nevada County Historical Society.

== See also ==
- National Register of Historic Places listings in Nevada County, California
