= Fire Services Museum, Macau =

Museum in Santo António, Macau, China

Fire Services Museum
- 消防博物館; Museu dos Bombeiros
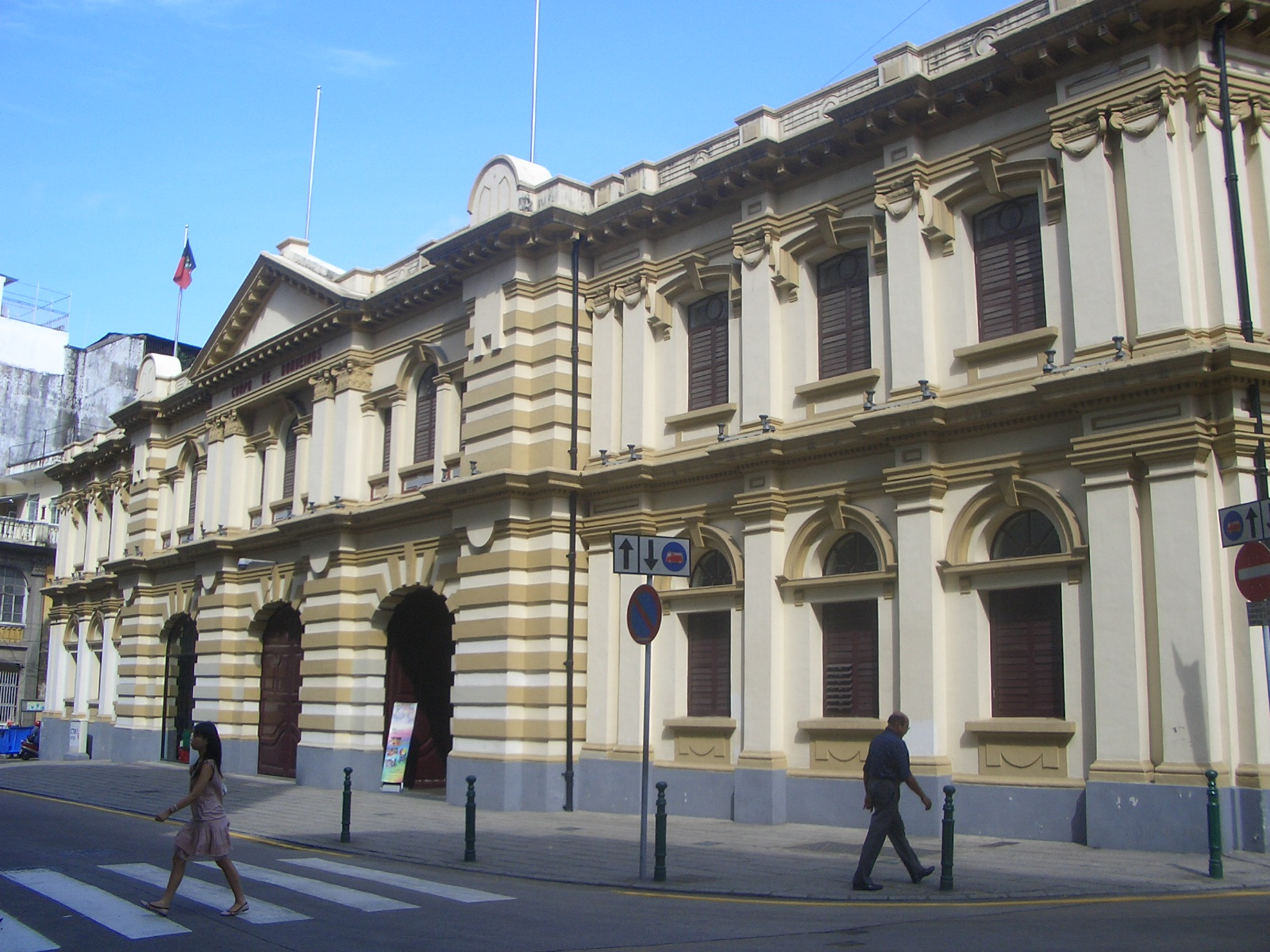
- Established: 11 December 1999
- Location: Santo António, Macau, China
- Coordinates: 22°12′00.4″N 113°32′36.5″E
- Type: museum

Fire Services Museum, Macau

Chinese name
- Traditional Chinese: 消防博物館
- Simplified Chinese: 消防博物馆
Transcriptions
Standard Mandarin
- Hanyu Pinyin: Xiāofáng Bówùguǎn
Yue: Cantonese
- Jyutping: siu1 fong4 bok3 mat6 gun2

Portuguese name
- Portuguese: Museu dos Bombeiros

The Fire Services Museum (Chinese: 消防博物館; Portuguese: Museu dos Bombeiros) is a museum about firefighting in Santo António, Macau, China.

== History ==
The museum building was constructed in 1920. The museum was opened on 11 December 1999.

== Architecture ==
The museum building was built in a European style. It has two exhibition halls with a total area of 350 m^{2}.

== Exhibitions ==
The museum exhibits more than 700 artifacts about fire fighting system, including vehicles and instruments to extinguish fire.

== See also ==
- Fire Services Bureau
