= Hall of Flame Fire Museum =

Museum in Phoenix, Arizona

Coordinates: 33.447385°N 111.95336°W

National Historical Fire Foundation

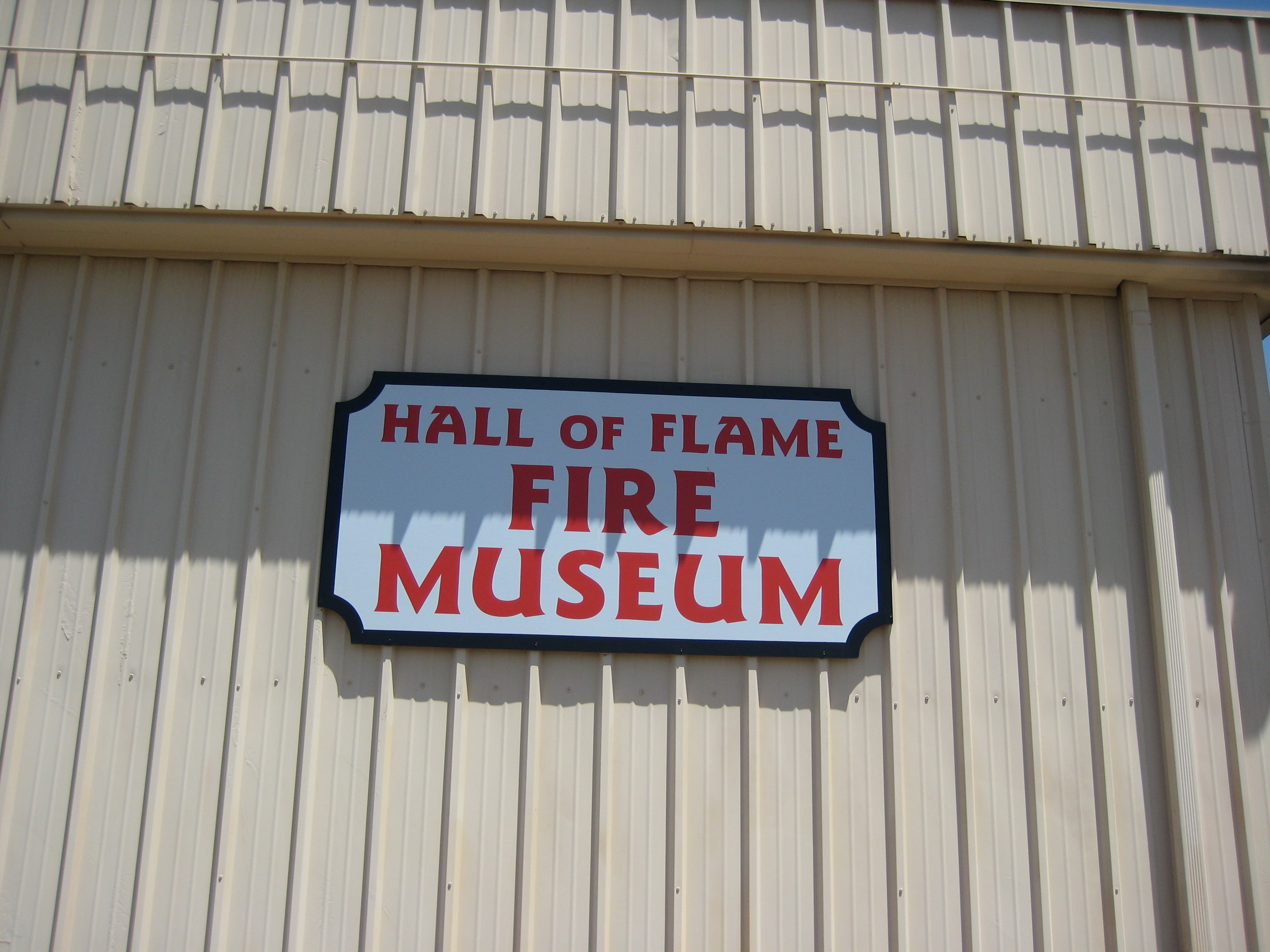
- Established: 1961
- Location: Phoenix, Arizona, United States
- Type: Non-profit: science, industry
- Director: Chuck Montgomery
- Curator: Mark Moorhead
- Website: HallofFlame.org

The National Historical Fire Foundation (better known as the Hall of Flame Museum of Firefighting) is a museum dedicated to the historical preservation of firefighting equipment used through the years around the world.

A number of the collection's vehicles are taken out of the Museum by volunteer operators to participate in Phoenix-area parades and other events.

It is in Phoenix, Arizona at 6101 East Van Buren St across from the Phoenix Zoo and adjacent to the Phoenix Municipal Stadium.

The name is a play on words on "Hall of Fame".

== History ==
The museum's artifacts were originally the private collection of George F. Getz Jr., who opened the original Hall of Flame in Wisconsin in 1961. The collection relocated to Phoenix in 1974, and has since grown into the world's largest historical firefighting museum.

== Exhibits ==
The museum has five large exhibit galleries, a video theater, and the National Firefighting Hall of Heroes, which commemorates U.S. firefighters who have died in the line of duty or have been decorated for acts of heroism. The equipment is grouped as: Gallery One: Hand & Horse Drawn (1725–1908); Gallery Two: Motorized Apparatus (1897–1951); Gallery Three: Motorized Apparatus (1918–1968); Gallery Four: Motorized Apparatus (1919–1950) and a smaller gallery devoted to Wildland Firefighting. It also has a large collection of fire department arm patches, early fire insurance marks, fire helmets, art objects and other types of graphics, as well as a children's play area.

== Gallery ==
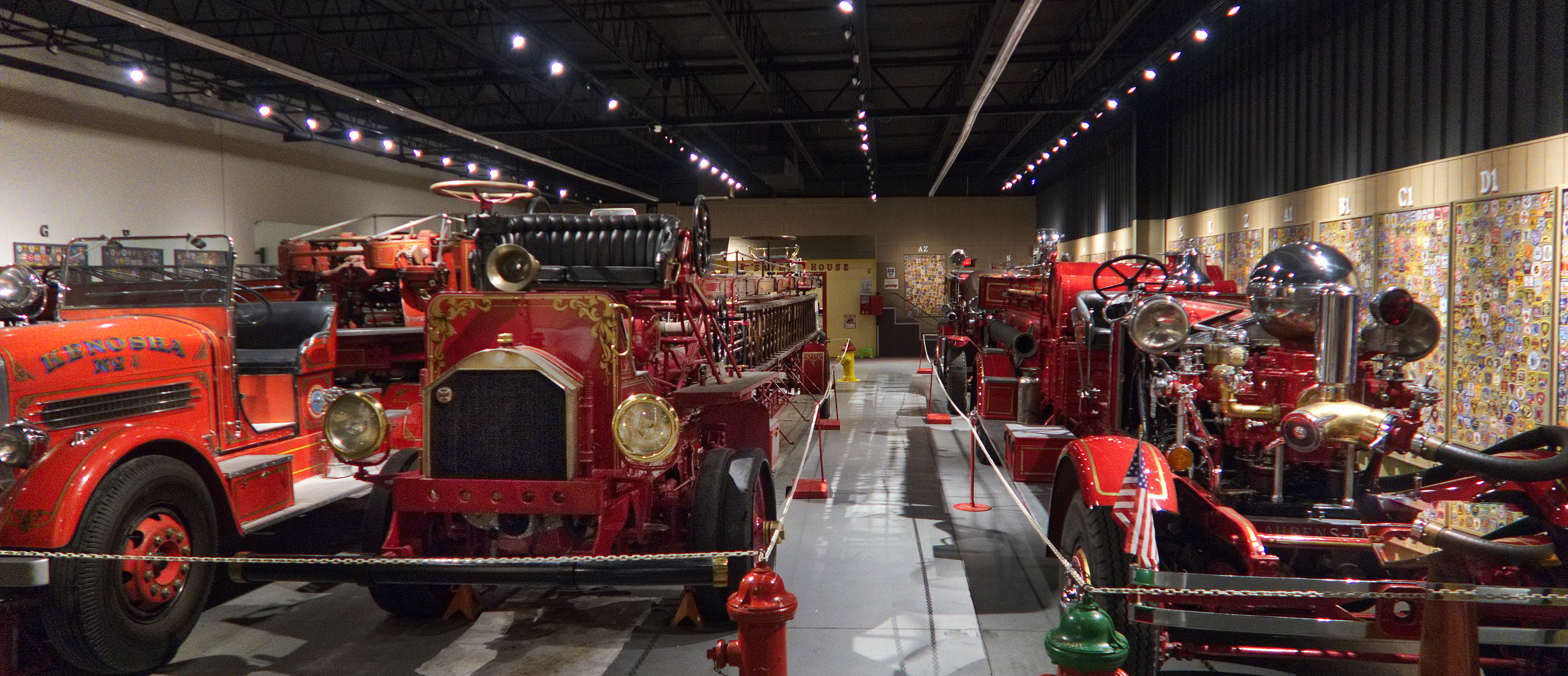
Hook and Ladder vehicles

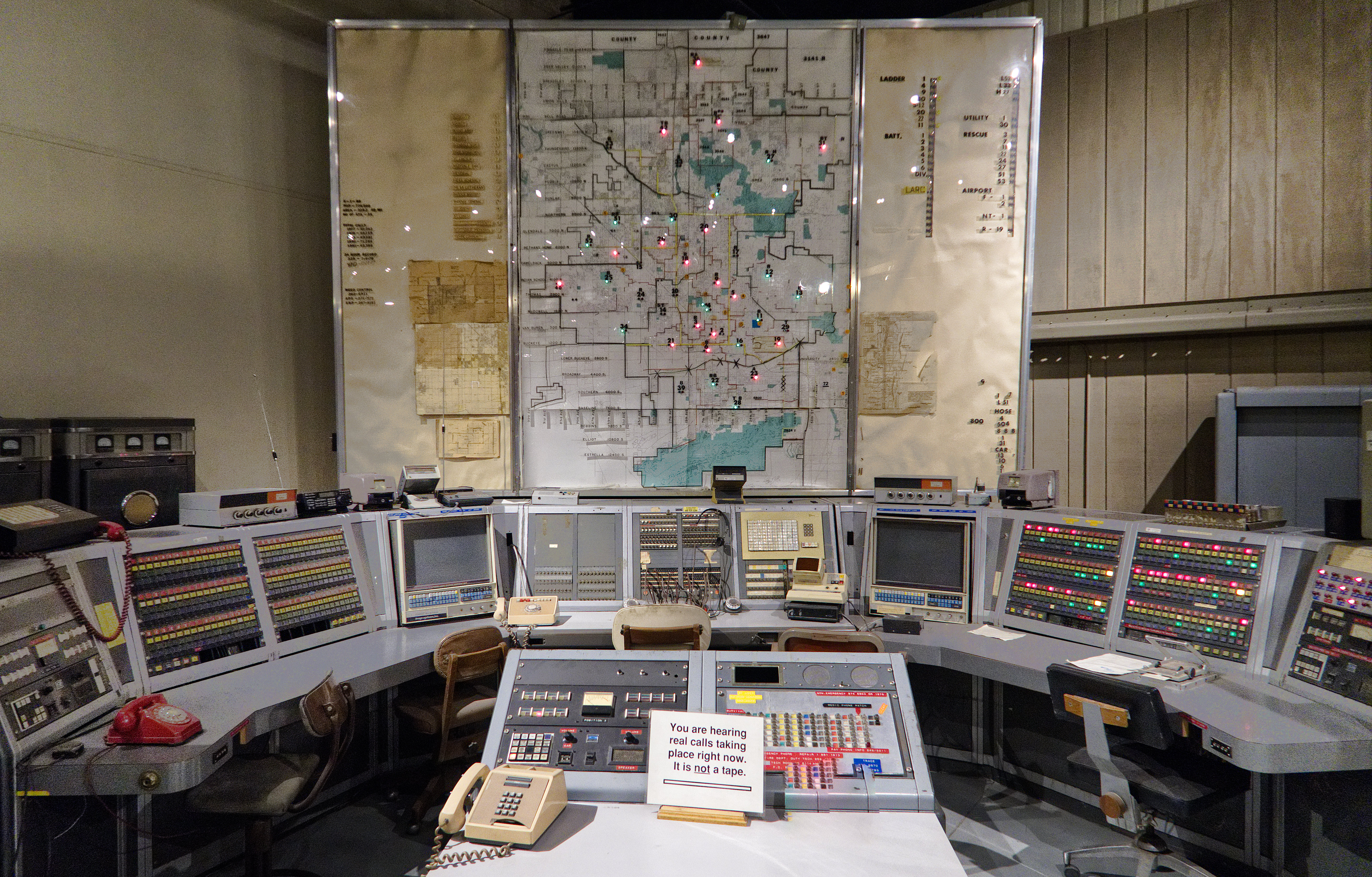
Command Center

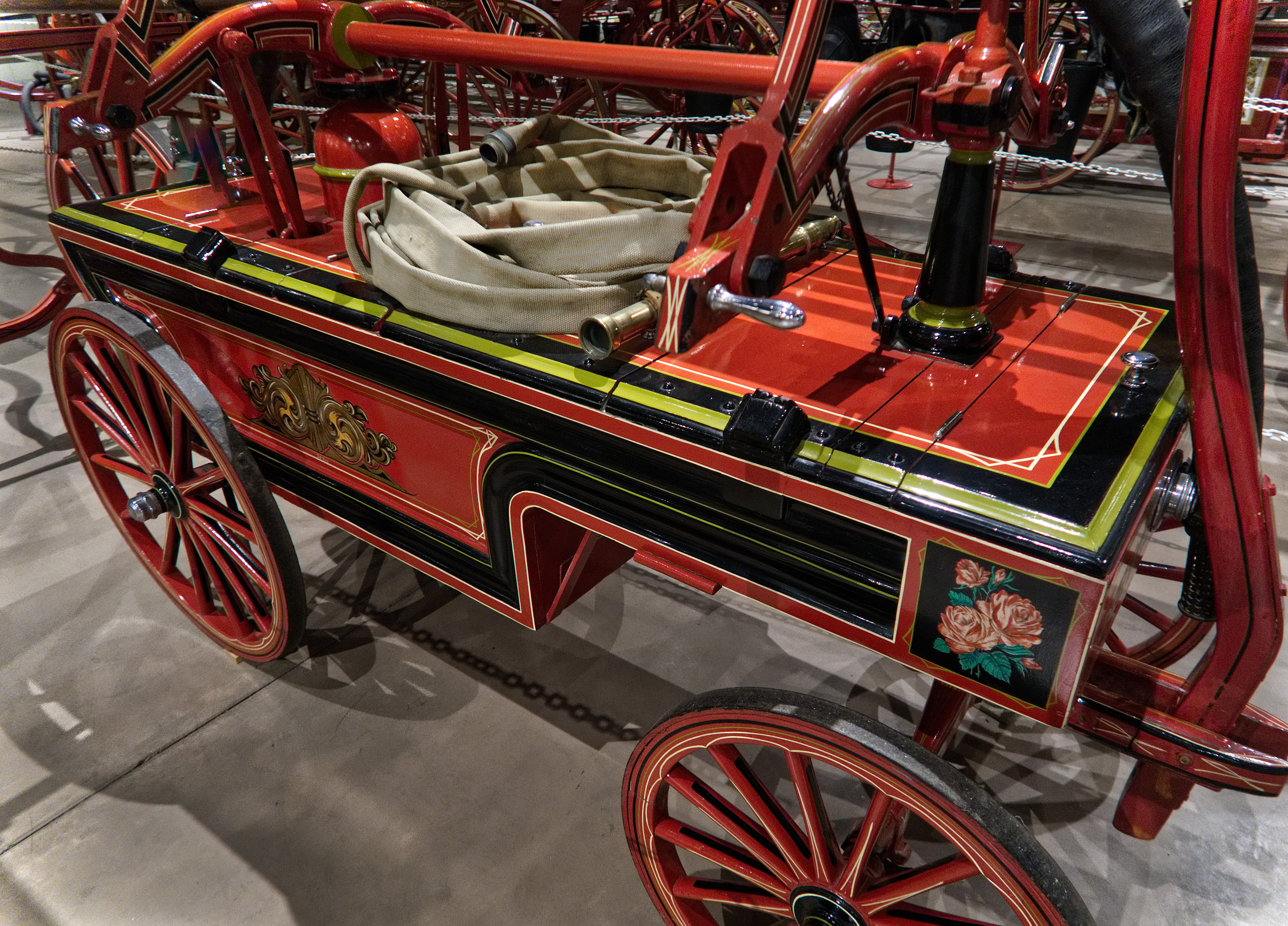
Pumping vehicle - 19th century

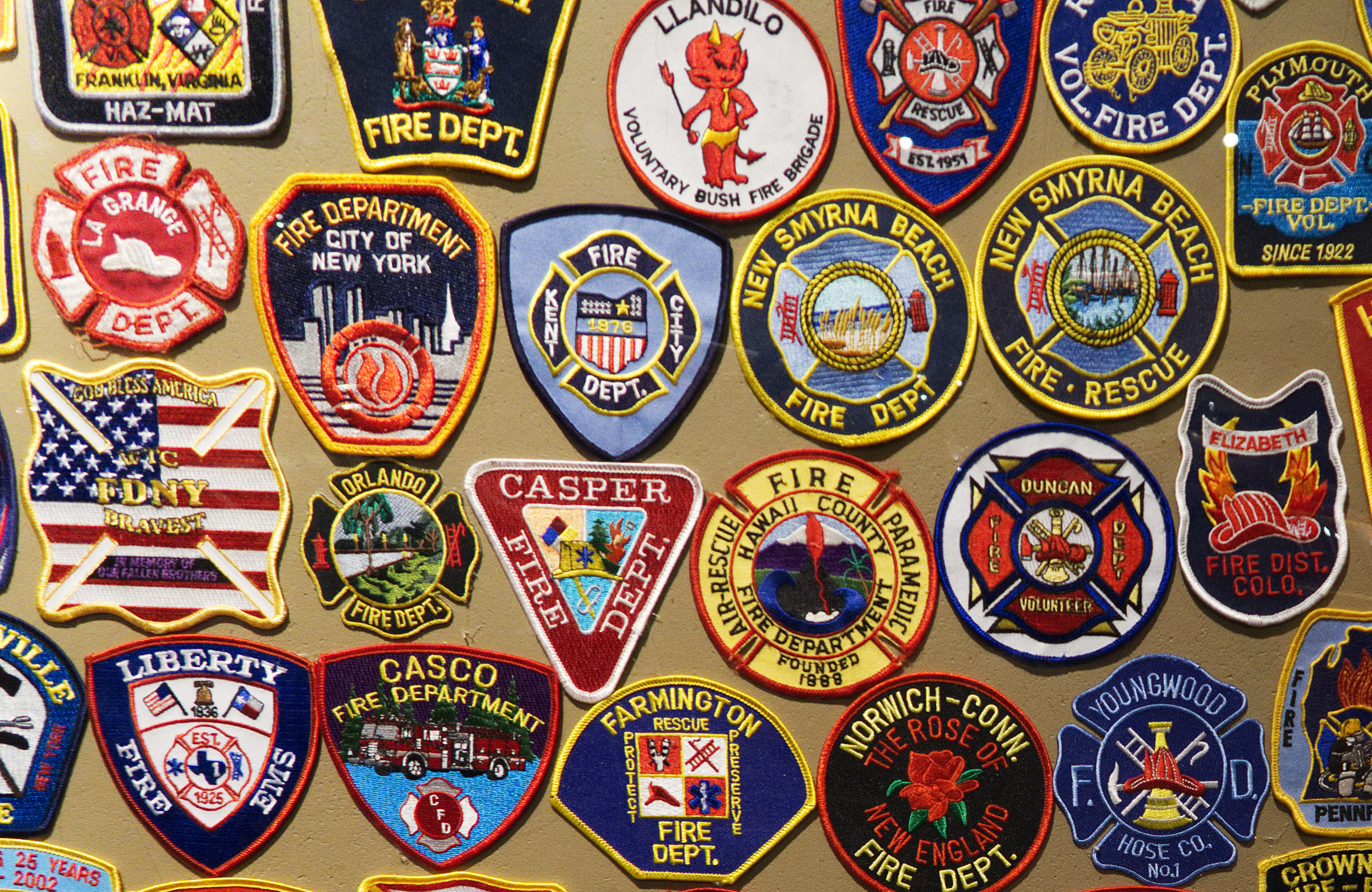
Fire department badges display

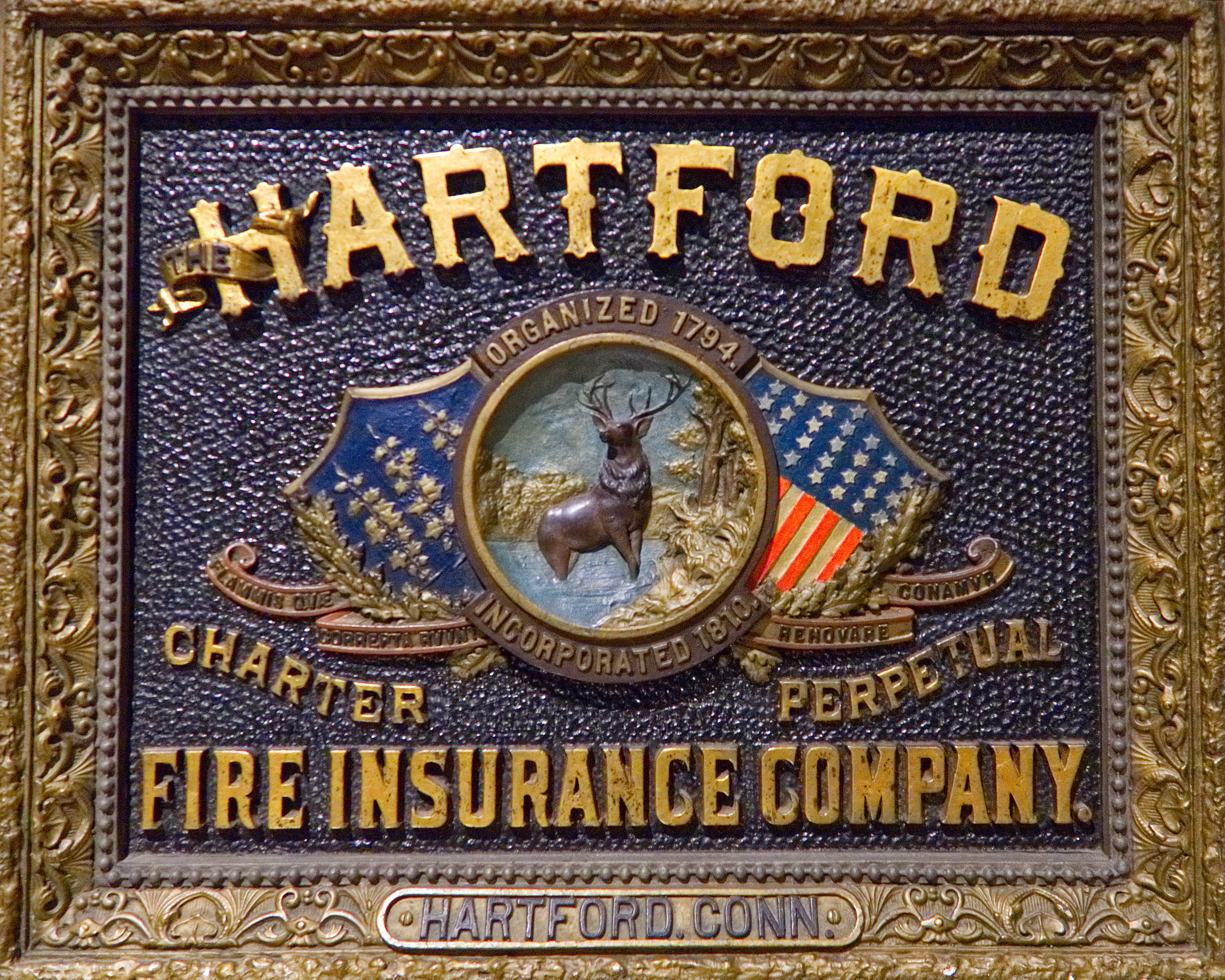
Hartford Fire Insurance plaque

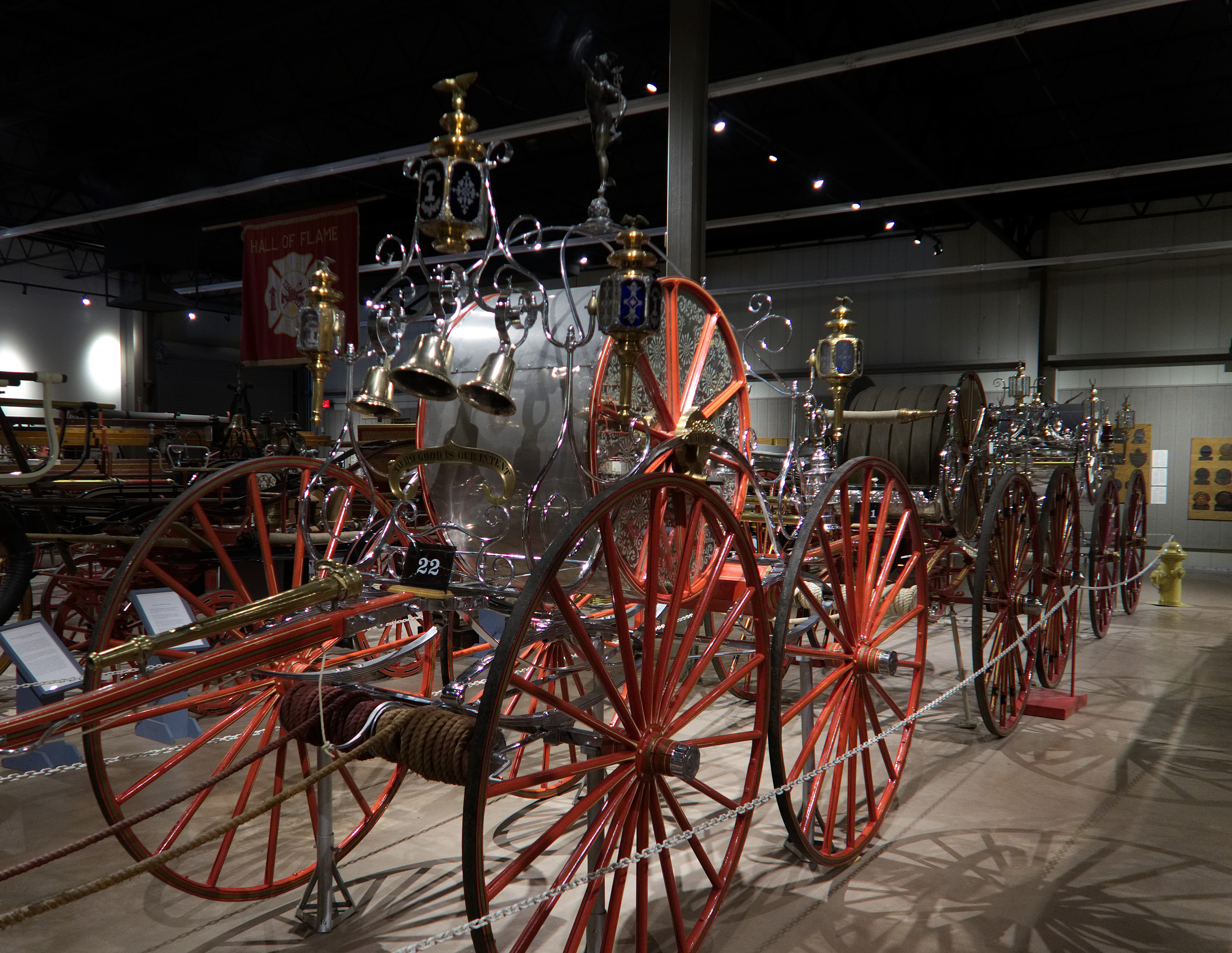
Early fire-fighting vehicles
