= Liberty Fire Company No. 5 =

- U.S. National Register of Historic Places
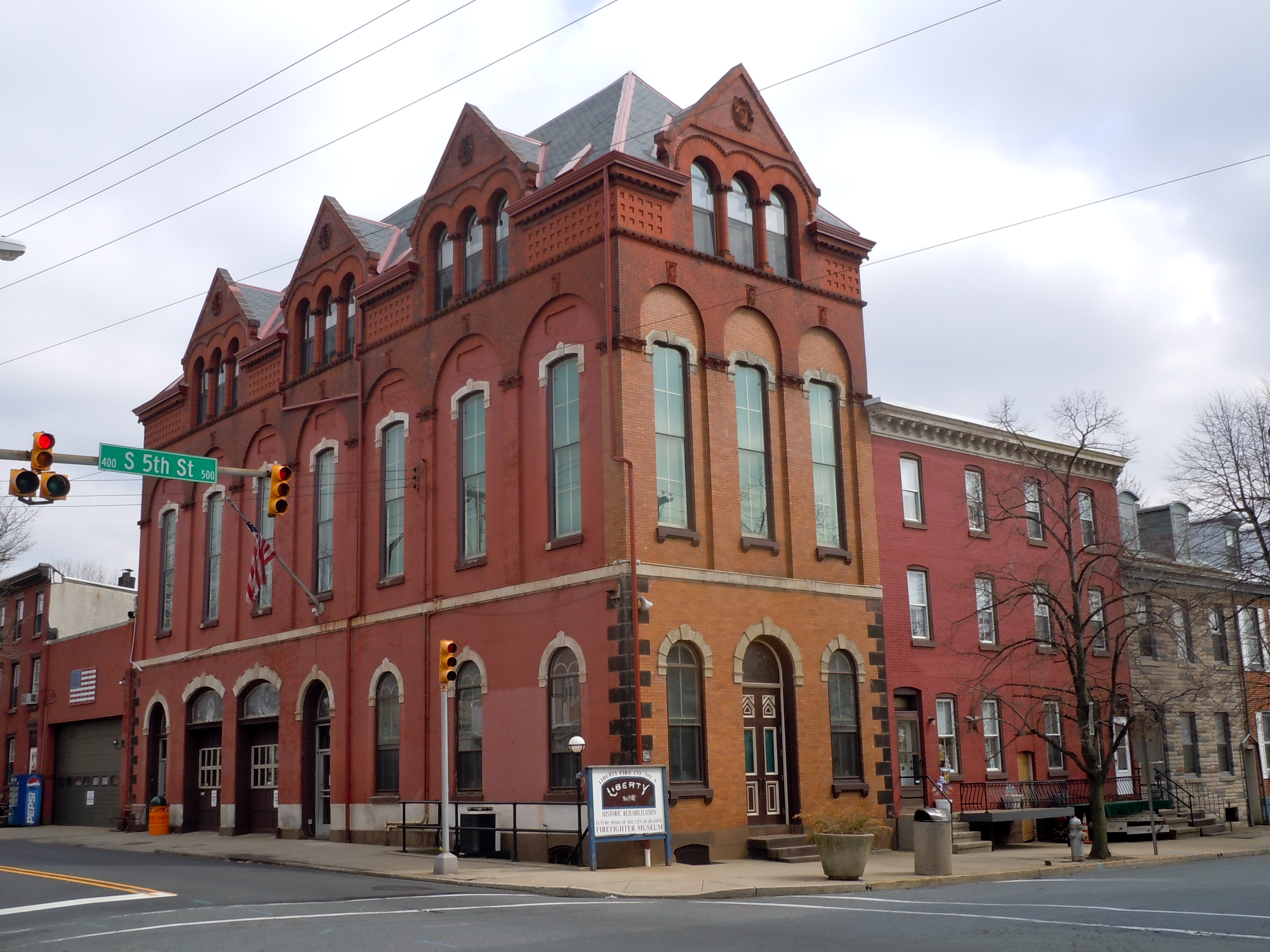
- Reading Area Firefighters Museum, April 2011

- Location within Pennsylvania Location within the United States
- Location: 501 South 5th Street, Reading, Pennsylvania
- Coordinates: 40°19′39″N 75°55′36″W
- Area: 1 acre (0.40 ha)
- Built: 1876
- Architect: Mull, Edward K.; Smith, Alexander F.
- Architectural style: Italianate, Romanesque
- NRHP reference No.: 85000112
- Added to NRHP: January 18, 1985

The Liberty Fire Company No. 5 is an historic fire station in Reading, Berks County, Pennsylvania, United States.

It was listed on the National Register of Historic Places in 1985.

== History and architectural features ==
Built in 1876, this historic structure is a three-story, brick building that was designed in the Italianate style. It was originally two-stories, with the third story added in 1895. The third story and roofline is reflective of the Victorian Romanesque style. The building is now operated as the Reading Area Firefighters Museum.
