= National Emergency Services Museum =

Museum in Sheffield, England

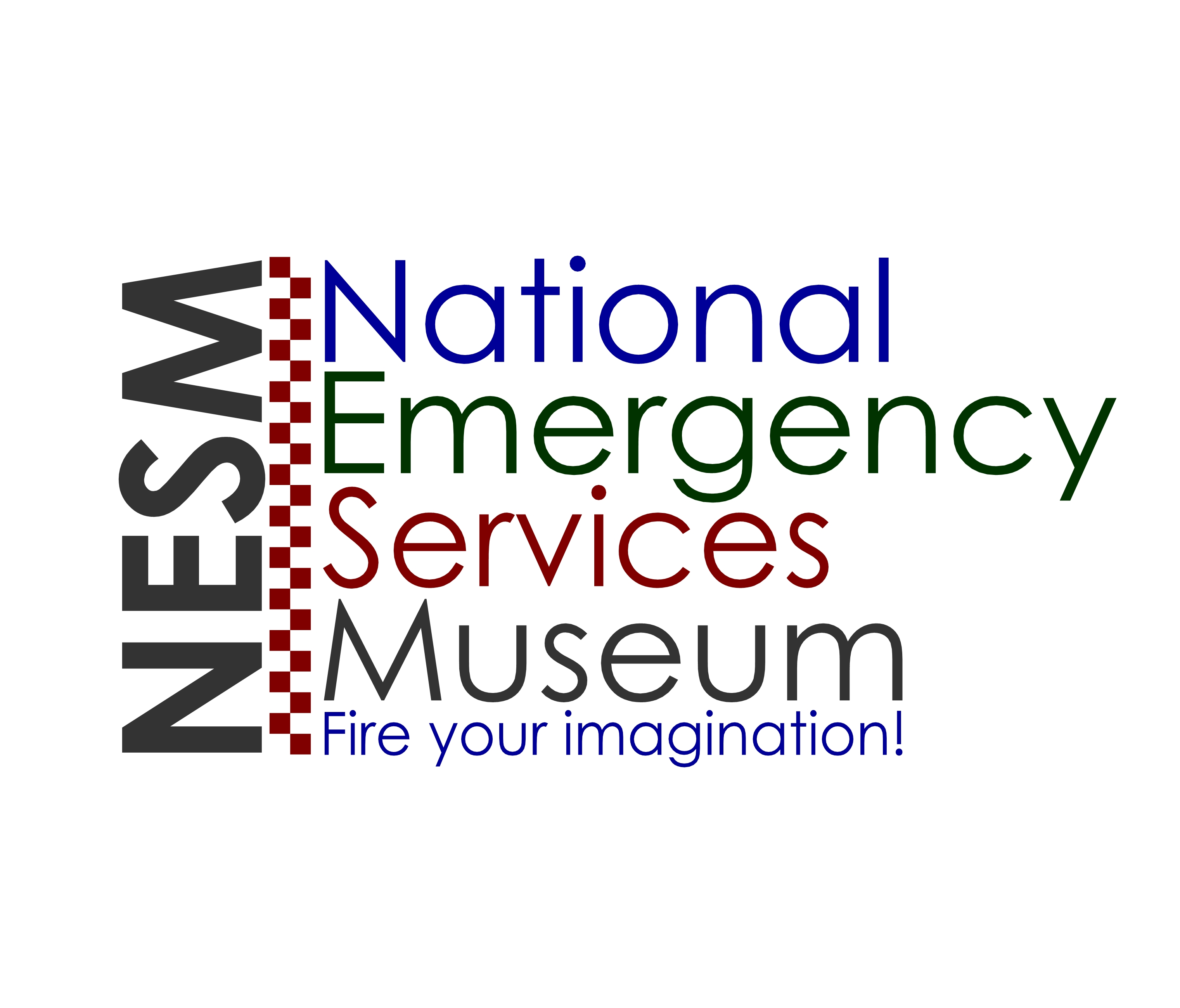
- Established: 8 May 1984
- Location: Sheffield, South Yorkshire, England
- Coordinates: 53.3855°N 1.4707°W
- Type: Heritage centre
- Visitors: 36,000
- CEO: Matt Wakefield
- Curator: Patrick Coleman
- Parking: Workhouse Lane (Council Car Park)
- Website: visitnesm.org.uk

The National Emergency Services Museum is a museum in Sheffield, England. Opened on 8 May 1984 as the Sheffield Fire and Police Museum, it was given its present name on 1 January 2014.

== Building ==
The museum is based at a former combined police, fire and ambulance station, opened in 1900 at the junction of West Bar and West Bar Green near the city centre. The museum has its original Victorian police cells. A notable feature is one of the few remaining Fire Brigade observation towers in the United Kingdom. Others include the headquarters of Liverpool Fire Brigade at Hatton Garden, Liverpool, and the now-closed Woolwich Fire Station.

== Collection ==
The museum's collection covers the history of the Police service, Fire and Rescue Services, Ambulance services and the Coastguard. The museum holds the H.M. Cousturads heritage collection, the Donald Sunderland Swanson collection, and a UK Military police collection. It has exhibitions covering Victorian detective work, the RNLI, Yorkshire Air Ambulance, among others. The museum is a Registered Charity (1161866) run by volunteers, and is open on Wednesday to Sunday, 10 – 4.

== Gallery ==
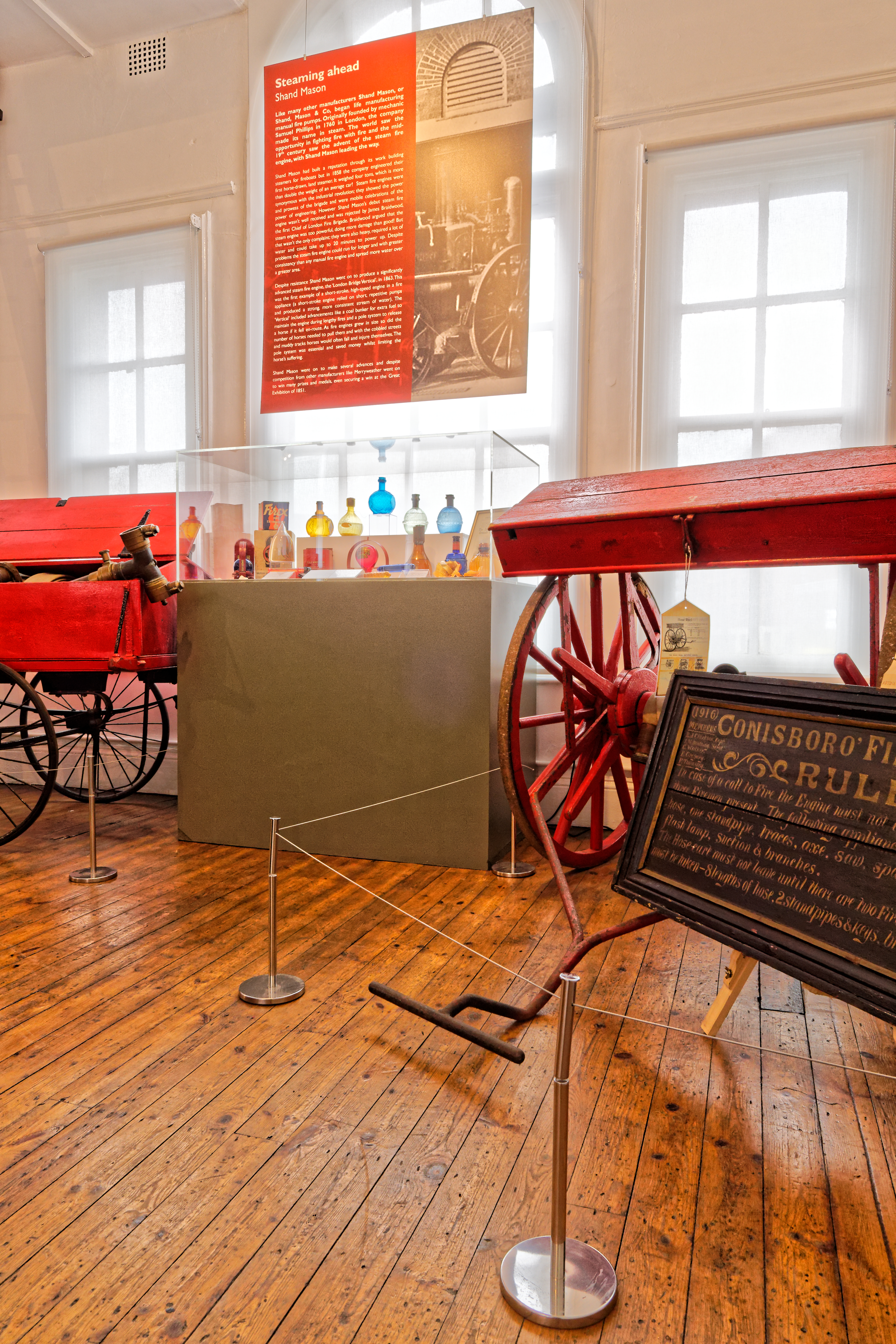

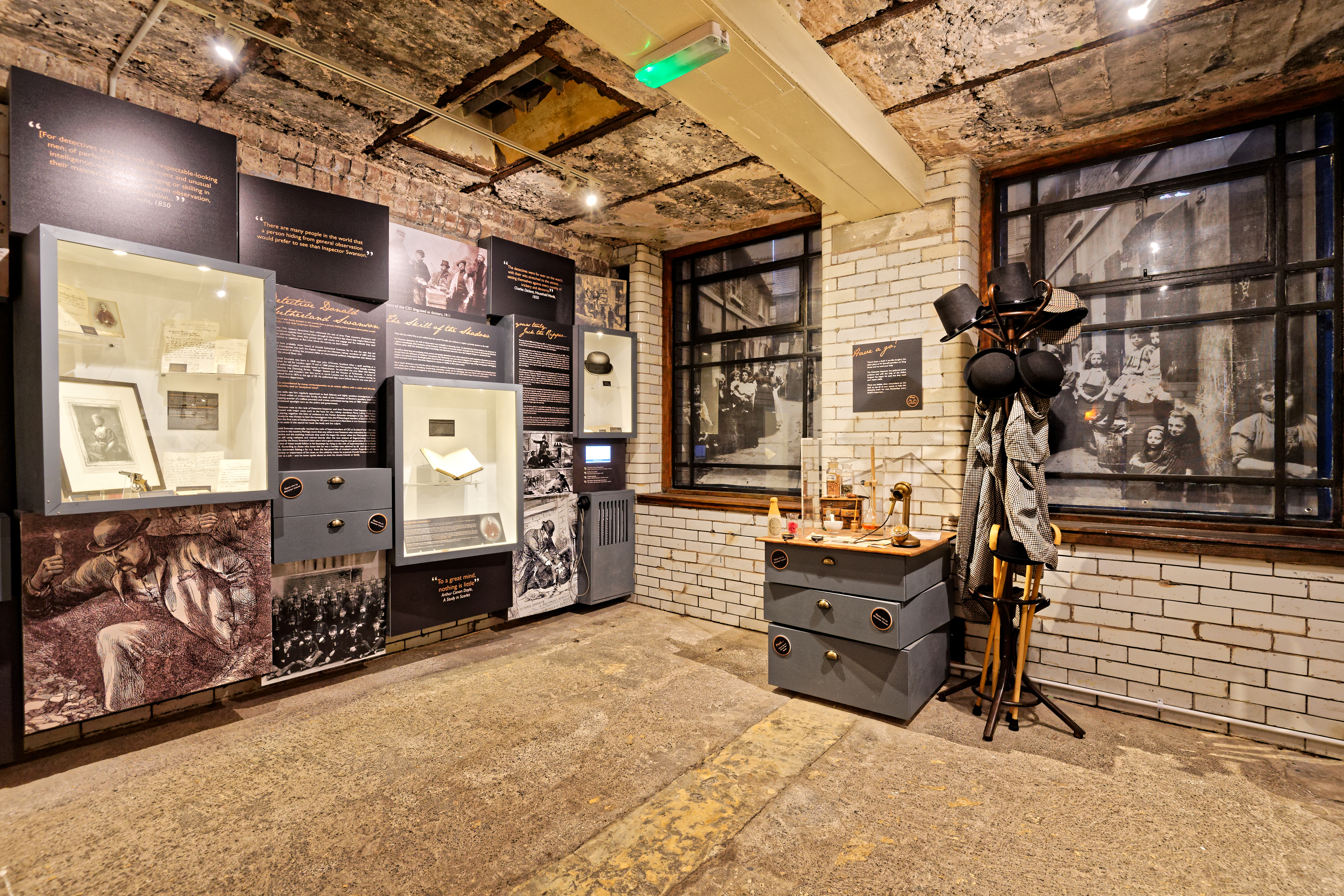

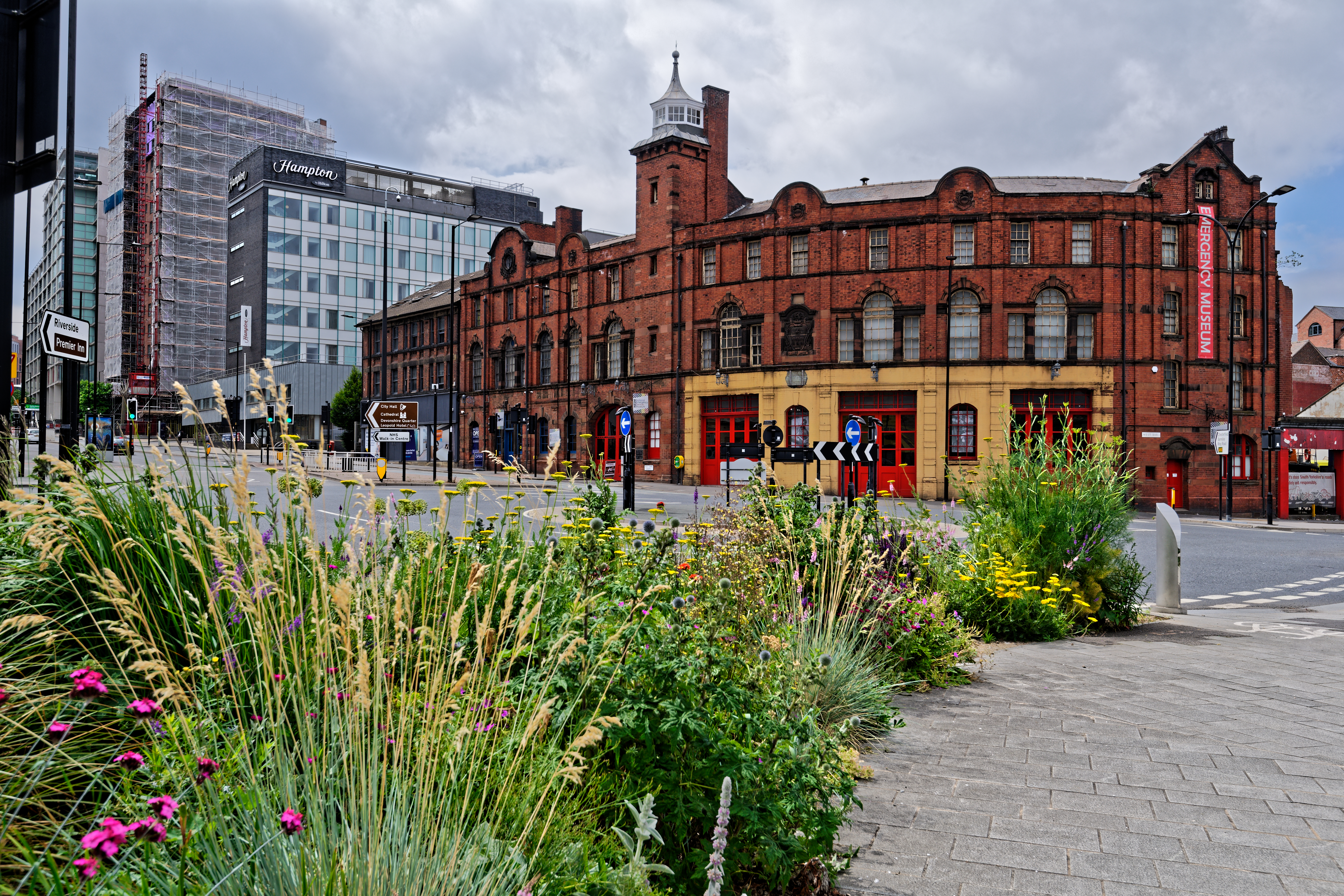

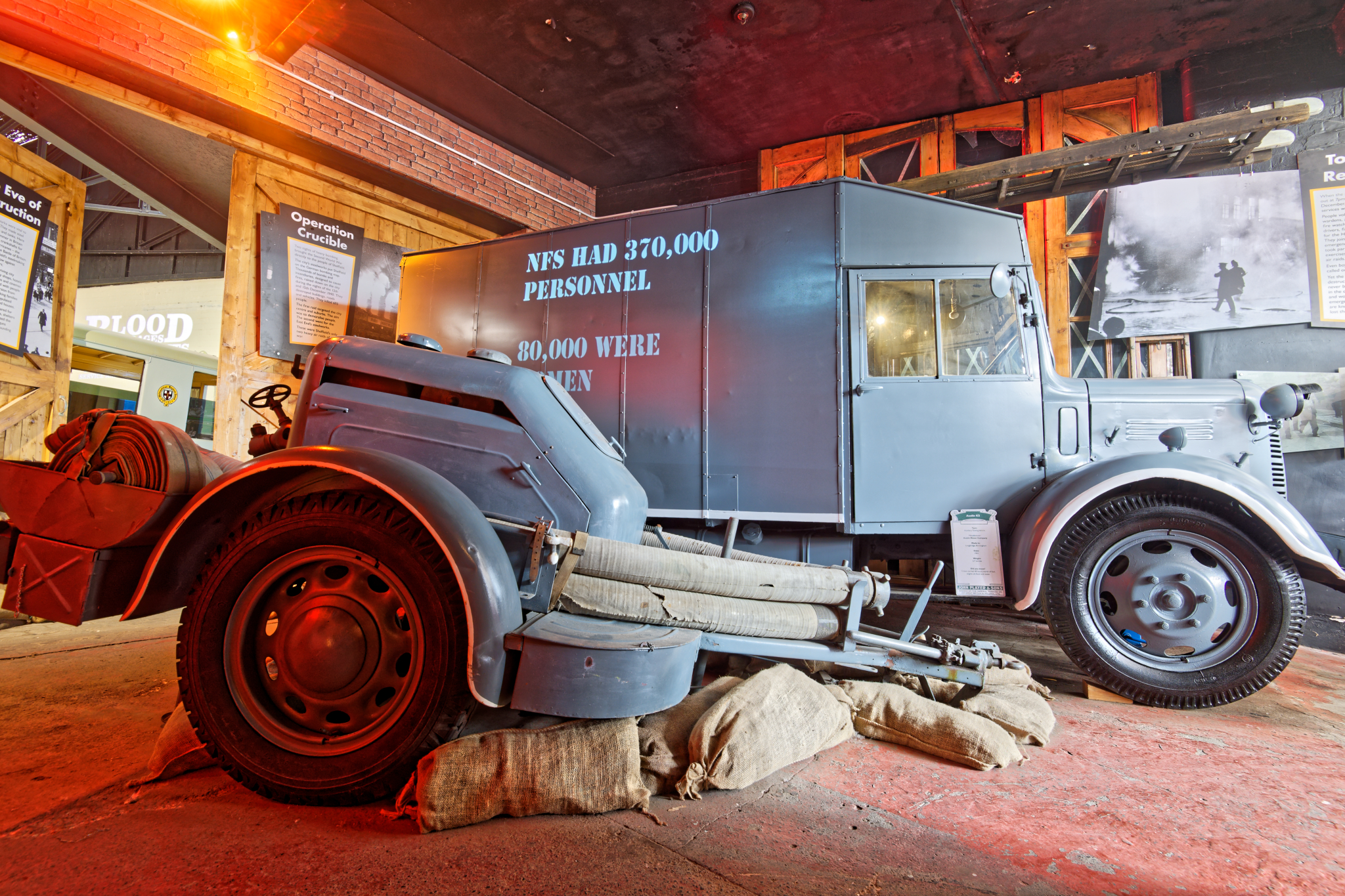

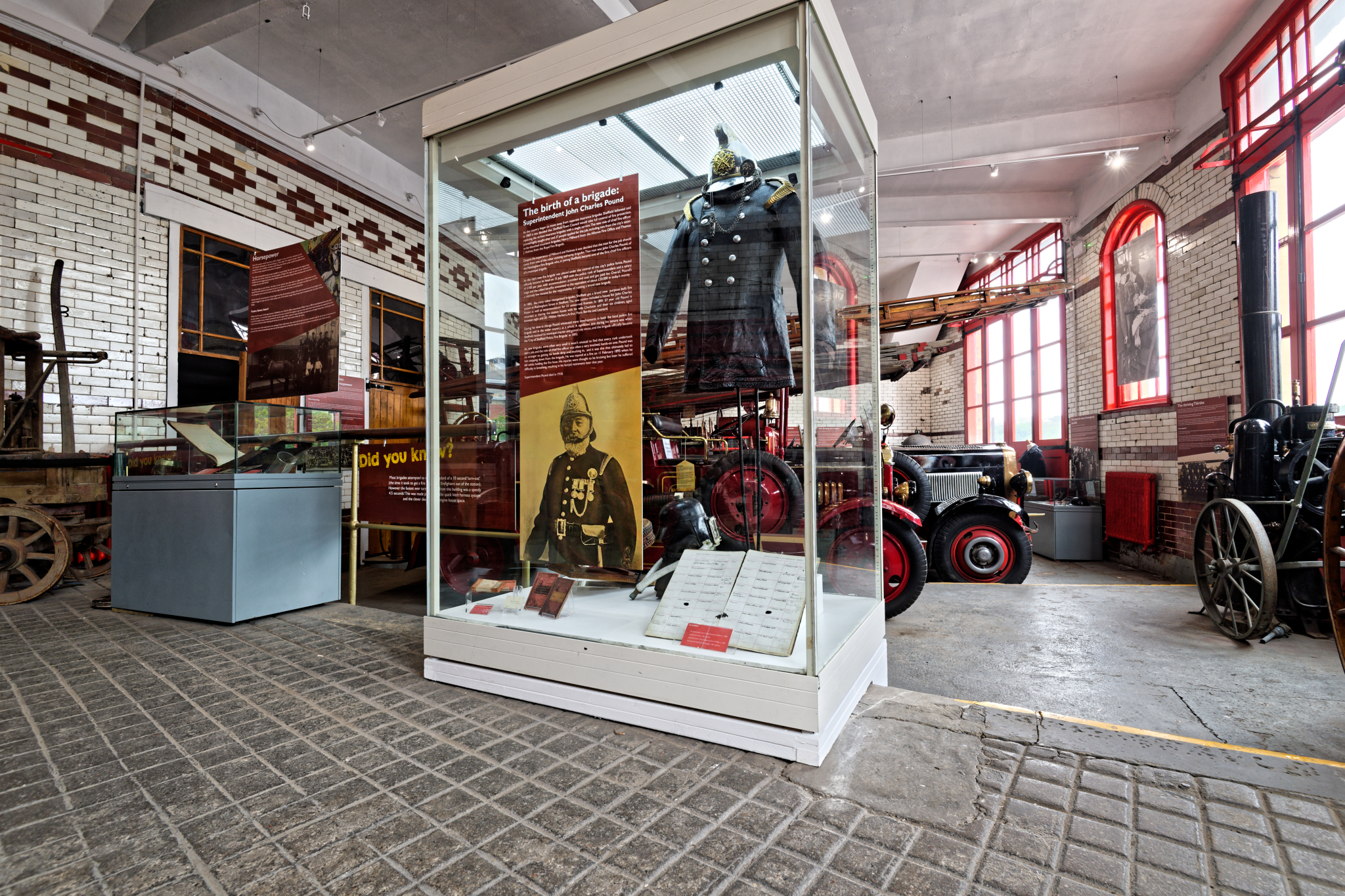

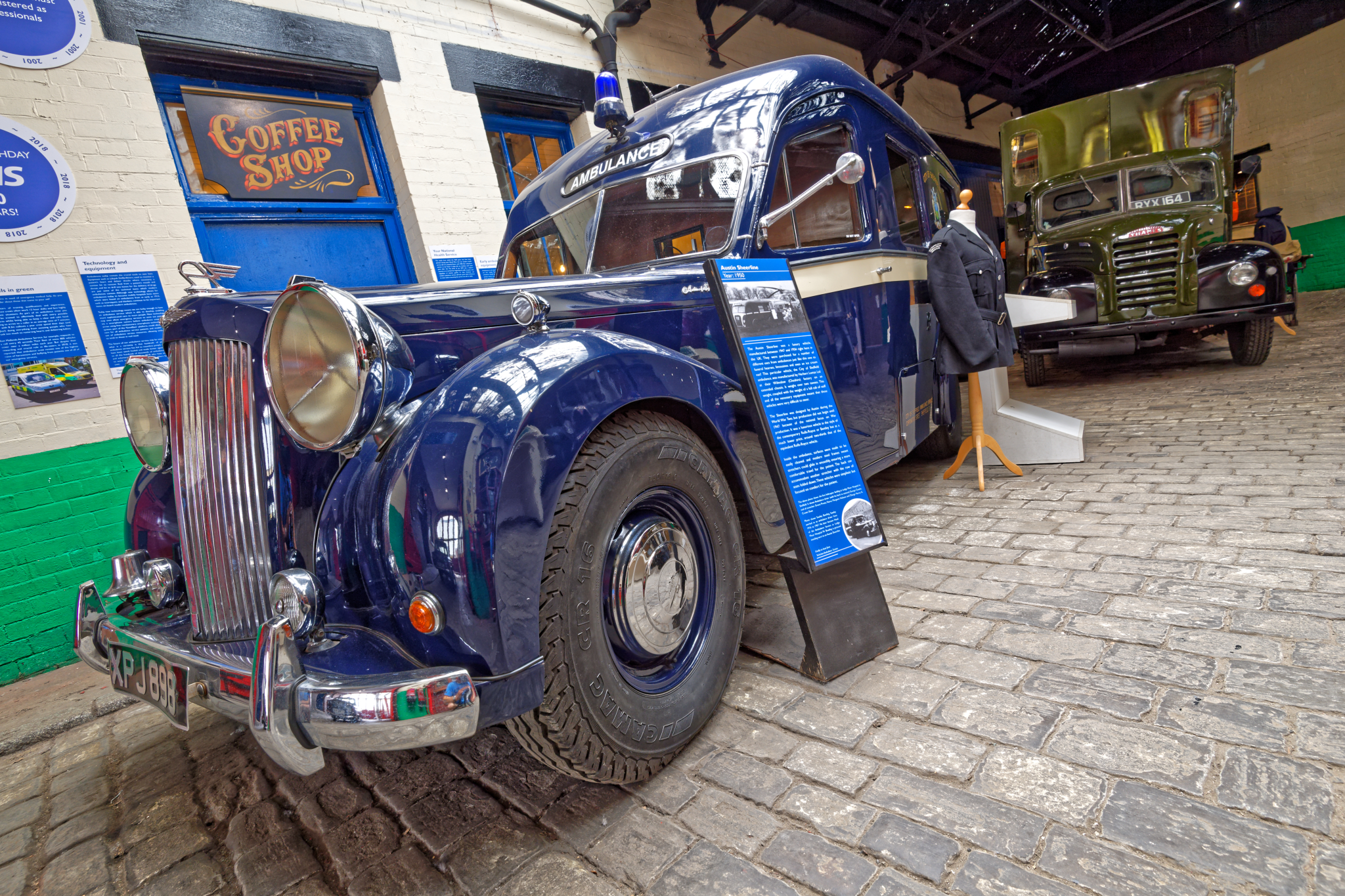
