= Nevada City Firehouse No. 2 =

- U.S. National Register of Historic Places
- U.S. Historic district – Contributing property
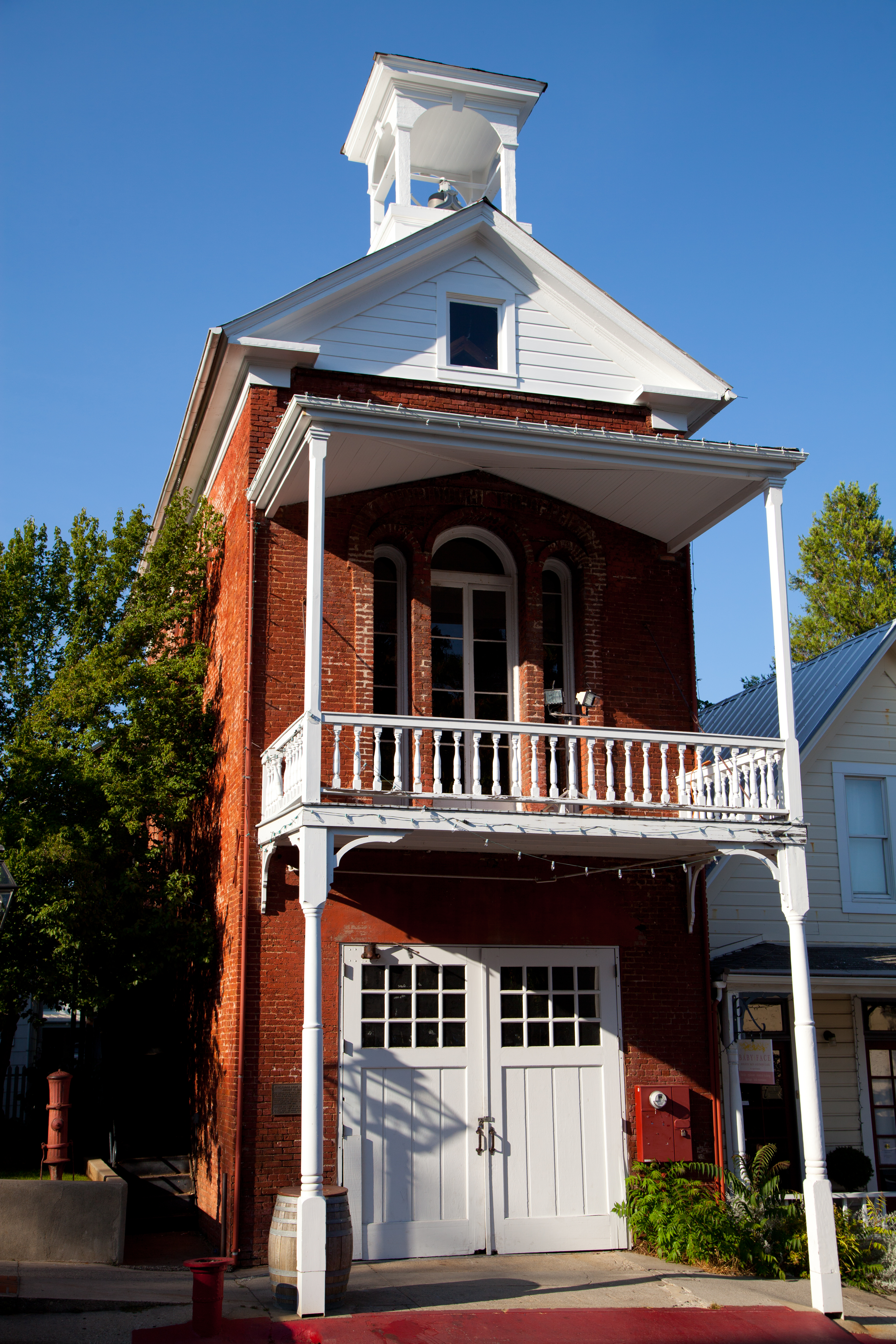
- The firehouse in 2012

- Location within California Location within the United States
- Location: 420 Broad Street, Nevada City, California
- Coordinates: 39°15′47.2″N 121°1′13.3″W
- Area: 0.1 acres (0.04 ha)
- Built: 1860–1861
- Architect: Kent and Mackay
- Architectural style: Classic Revival
- Part of: Nevada City Downtown Historic District (ID85002520)
- NRHP reference No.: 74000544

Significant dates
- Added to NRHP: May 3, 1974
- Designated CP: September 23, 1985

Nevada City Firehouse No. 2, also known as Eureka Hose Company Firehouse No. 2, Pennsylvania Engine Company Firehouse No. 2, and Broad Street Firehouse No. 2, is a historic former firehouse located at 420 Broad Street in Nevada City, California, United States. Completed in January 1861 as the city's first firehouse, it is notable for its architecture and its relation to the California gold rush.

== History ==
=== Construction and use ===
Nevada City was California's most important mining town during the California gold rush, and by March 1850, it was the third largest city in the state. The first great fire that leveled Nevada City occurred in 1851, and by 1859, the city had suffered four additional fires. In December 1859, the women of the city decided to act; on December 26, they raised $923.50 ($33,092 in 2025) from a ball and a week later they raised $149 ($5,339 in 2025) from a theatrical show, all of which were to be put towards the construction of a firehouse.

Nevada City Firehouse No. 2 was the first firehouse built in Nevada City. At the time, the city had three groups competing for firehouse funds: the 37- or 47-member Nevada Hose Company on Main Street (organized June 12, 1860), the 34-member Eureka Hose Company on Broad Street (organized June 13, 1860), and the 37-member Protection Hook & Ladder (organized June 23, 1860). While Nevada Hose Company officially organized a day before Eureka Hose Company, Eureka Hose Company was offered the money raised by the women in the city. These private funds and an additional $1,000 ($35,833 in 2025) in public funds were used to build Eureka Hose Company Firehouse No. 2, which was completed before Nevada Hose Company's firehouse despite it being labeled No. 2.

Eureka Hose Company Firehouse No. 2 was designed by Kent and Mackay. Its cornerstone was laid on October 17, 1860, and it was completed and equipment moved in on January 14, 1861. Soon after, the company discovered the fire engine they purchased was inscribed with the name "Pennsylvania Engine Company No. 12", so they scratched off the "1" and in August 1860 they renamed their firehouse Pennsylvania Engine Company Firehouse No. 2.

Pennsylvania Engine Company Firehouse No. 2's roof and interior were damaged by fire in 1880 and the firehouse's front columns have also been damaged by vehicle accidents. At some point, the firehouse was renamed Broad Street Firehouse No. 2.

=== Historic building ===
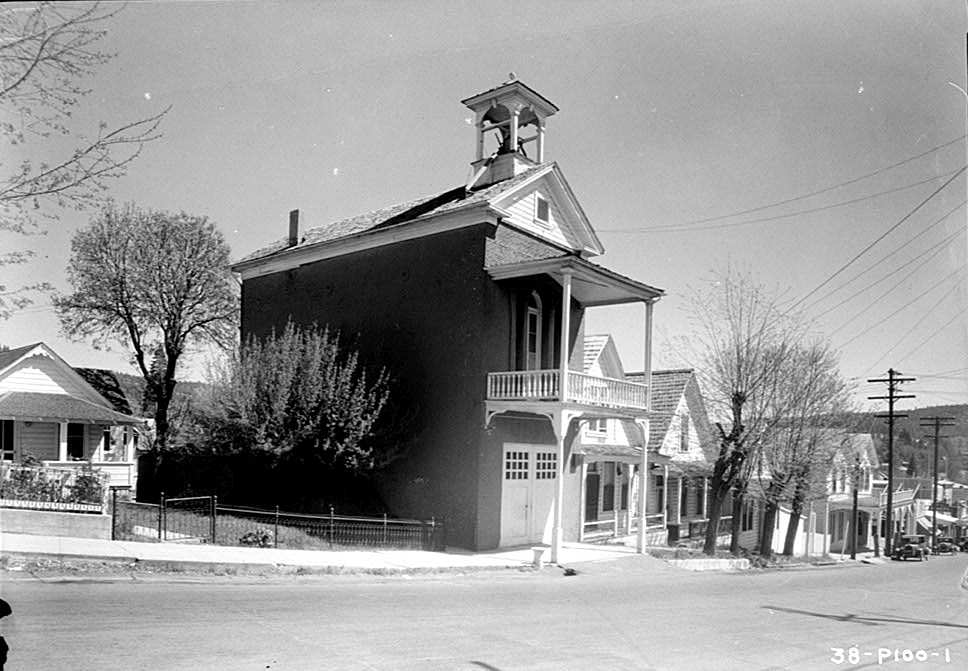
The firehouse in 1936

In 1968, the firehouse was included by the city of Nevada City in its historic district. In 1974, the firehouse was added to the National Register of Historic Places, at which point it was known as Nevada City Firehouse No. 2 and was still in use as a firehouse. In 1985, the firehouse was included as a contributing property in the Nevada City Downtown Historic District, where it was described as "virtually unchanged from [its] earliest available photographs".

By 2002, the firehouse had been converted to a museum, with the original Pennsylvania Engine Company No. 12 fire engine on display. The engine is also occasionally used for Fourth of July parades.

== Architecture and design ==
The firehouse is 16 by 30 feet (4.9 by 9.1 m), two stories, and is made of brick and wood. It features a Classic Revival design that includes a wide ground-level doorway framed by pilasters; two heavy wood doors, each with twelve small windows at the top; a second-story facade with a tall, narrow, arched, glass-paned doorway and narrow sidelights; Greek Revival cornice; a slightly recessed wood pediment; and a wood belvedere containing a fire bell in a square cupola. Additionally, fronting the building is a two-story white wood portico supported by posts and brackets, featuring a second-story balustrade railing, and covered by a shingled roof, all of which provide cover for the sidewalk outside the building's entrance. The building also features an iron open-air stairway to the second floor.

The building is considered "simple," "utilitarian," and "a good example of period and style of architecture."

== See also ==
- National Register of Historic Places listings in Nevada County, California
