= Scottish Fire and Rescue Service Museum and Heritage Centre =

Museum in Greenock, Scotland

Coordinates: 55.948°N 4.755°W

The Scottish Fire and Rescue Service Museum and Heritage Centre is a museum located within the Old Fire Station on Dalrymple Street which is part of the Municipal Buildings in Greenock, Inverclyde, Scotland. It is a museum dedicated to the history of Scotland's fire and rescue service. It houses a wide range of artefacts and stories from the service's long history with displays on the history of firefighting, the development of fire safety in Scotland, and the history of the building. It is open to the public 12 pm to 4 pm on the last Sunday of the month and on days when cruise ships are in port in Greenock.

== History ==
It is operated by the Scottish Fire Brigades Heritage Trust, a registered charity known from 2013 to 2022 as the Scottish Fire and Rescue Service Heritage Trust. The Trust was formally Strathclyde Fire and Rescue Service Preservation Group, who can trace their origins back to 1995.

The Old Fire Station was empty for 52 years before the museum opened and the building is basically as it was when the Fire Station closed in 1960.

The Museum and Heritage Centre opened on the morning of June 28, 2012.

== Collection ==
The building has many original features including hose racks, cobblestones, concrete runs for the horses and also still has the original oak doors. Even the actual gas lamp fittings are still mounted on the walls.

The museum brings to life the stories of the firemen and families who lived and worked there through showcasing a collection of vintage fire engines, uniforms and equipment.

The trust are dedicated volunteers, proactive in restoration, conservation and preservation of these items. They operate a “Preservation Through Operation” policy whereby their appliances and equipment are kept in a mechanically sound and roadworthy condition by operating and maintaining them regularly. This means they can also provide a "Living Museum", taking vehicles and other exhibits to the public.

The Alexander Nisbet Firemarks Collection and the Two Minutes of Silence painting by Peter O’Neill can also be found in the museum.
