= History of education in California =

The history of education in California covers public and private schools and higher education since the colonial era.

The 23 California State University campuses

== Long-term trends ==
=== Colonial era ===
In Alta California (that is, the Spanish and Mexican colony before 1848), the cultural was oral; outside the military written materials were rare. In the Army, a prerequisite for promotion above the rank of corporal was literacy. The Spanish policy at the time, as a means of controlling their citizens, was to oppose popular education. The first school was opened in 1795 by a retired sergeant, in San Jose. Small schools taught by retired soldiers operated from time to time. José Antonio Carrillo is one of the few school teachers known by name. Governor Pablo Vicente de Solá (1815-1821) planned to use his own wealth to bring in two Spanish academics to establish a school in Monterey. After several weeks they concluded life in California as unbearable and left. In 1829, throughout Alta California, there were 339 students in 11 primary schools. A few small private schools operated. An example was one opened by Don Guillermo Arnel near present-day Salinas. For the last 20 years of Mexican administration the number of public schools ebbed and flowed. At times there were few schools operating due to a revolving lack of funds, lack of interest, politics, and lack of educators.

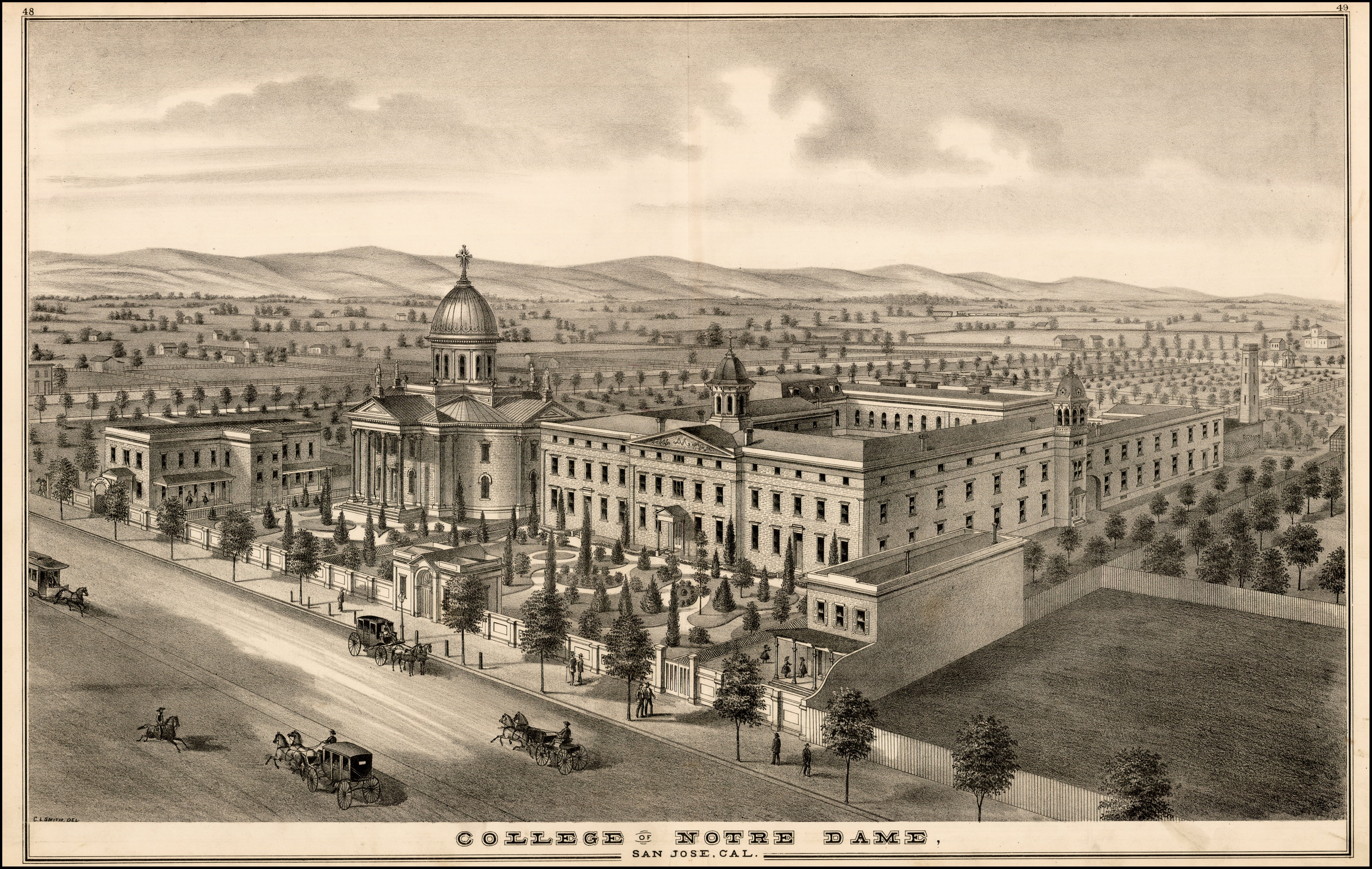
Founded by Catholic sisters in 1851, Notre Dame High School, in San Jose, is the oldest high school in California. It only admitted women.

=== Early statehood ===
In 1848 California was annexed from Mexico and become incorporated into the United States. Most of the 26,000 residents were Spanish and lived in Southern California. Perhaps two percent were literate. The new American regime dropped the oral emphasis and stressed written documentation. Literacy was now an advantage, and the Californios (Hispanics) embraced literacy. Public and Catholic elementary schools were established and proved popular. Loyola High School, founded by Catholics in Los Angeles in 1856, is the oldest educational institution in Southern California. By 1910. three fourths of Hispanic men and two thirds of the women could read and write.

In Northern California gold was discovered in 1848 and hundreds of thousands of miners from around the world poured in. They were young men who had left ther families behind and had little need for or interest in schools. Statehood came in 1850 and the new government was not opposed to schools. From 1854 onwards there was a small English language public education system present throughout the state. San Diego finally set up a public school in 1865, with a trained teacher from New England in charge. In 1866 42 students were enrolled studying primary level reading, writing, and arithmetic.

=== Late 19th century ===
- In 1853, the Los Angeles City School District was established as a forerunner of the Los Angeles Unified School District.
- In 1854, the San Diego Unified School District was established.
- In 1861, the Los Nietos School District was established.
- In 1868, the San Gabriel Unified School District was established as a K-8 school district before unification in 1994.
- In 1874, the Pasadena Unified School District was established as a K-8 school district before unification in 1960.
- In 1875, the Santa Monica-Malibu Unified School District was established.
- In 1886, the South Pasadena Unified School District was established.
- In 1886, the Alhambra Unified School District was established as a K-8 school district before unification in 2004.
- In 1890, the Los Angeles City High School District was established as a forerunner of the Los Angeles Unified School District.

=== Since 1945 ===
In World War II, three million soldiers and sailors from all parts of the country trained in 300 bases in California. Millions more came to work in the new war factories. Many spotted opportunity as the Los Angeles Times editorialized: "The story of the west’s great industrial future has spread over the nation and like the story of the discovery of gold, it is luring hopeful men whose dreams are spun of golden opportunity.". By 1946 the depression was gone, the economy was booming and veterans now had the GI bill that paid them to finish high school or attend college, start a new business, and obtain an inexpensive home mortgage. Every year hundreds of thousands of young couples migrated to California as the population tripled from seven million in 1940 to twenty million in 1970.

By the early 1950s their Baby Boom offspring were flooding the schools. The state's public school system was underbuilt, outdated, and hobbled by financial and administrative inefficiencies. Voter dissatisfaction led to the election of Max Rafferty, a staunch conservative, as state superintendent of public instruction in 1963 to 1971, while Pat Brown, a liberal Democrat, remained governor from 1959 to1967, This created highly visible ongoing conflicts between Rafferty and the California State Board of Education, chaired by liberal publisher Thomas W. Braden.

The state’s school funding system was obsolete, with local property taxes nearing their limit and significant inequalities among districts. Although state funds helped poorer districts, school bond measures often failed due to California’s high two-thirds approval requirement. Calls for reform, including state-controlled tax assessments and school district consolidation, faced intense resistance. Corruption in tax assessments became evident in 1966 when officials in multiple counties were convicted of bribery. Despite challenges in public school administration, California successfully expanded its higher education system. It created the nation’s largest university network and developed an elaborate network of state and community colleges to accommodate surging student enrollment.

== Catholic schools ==
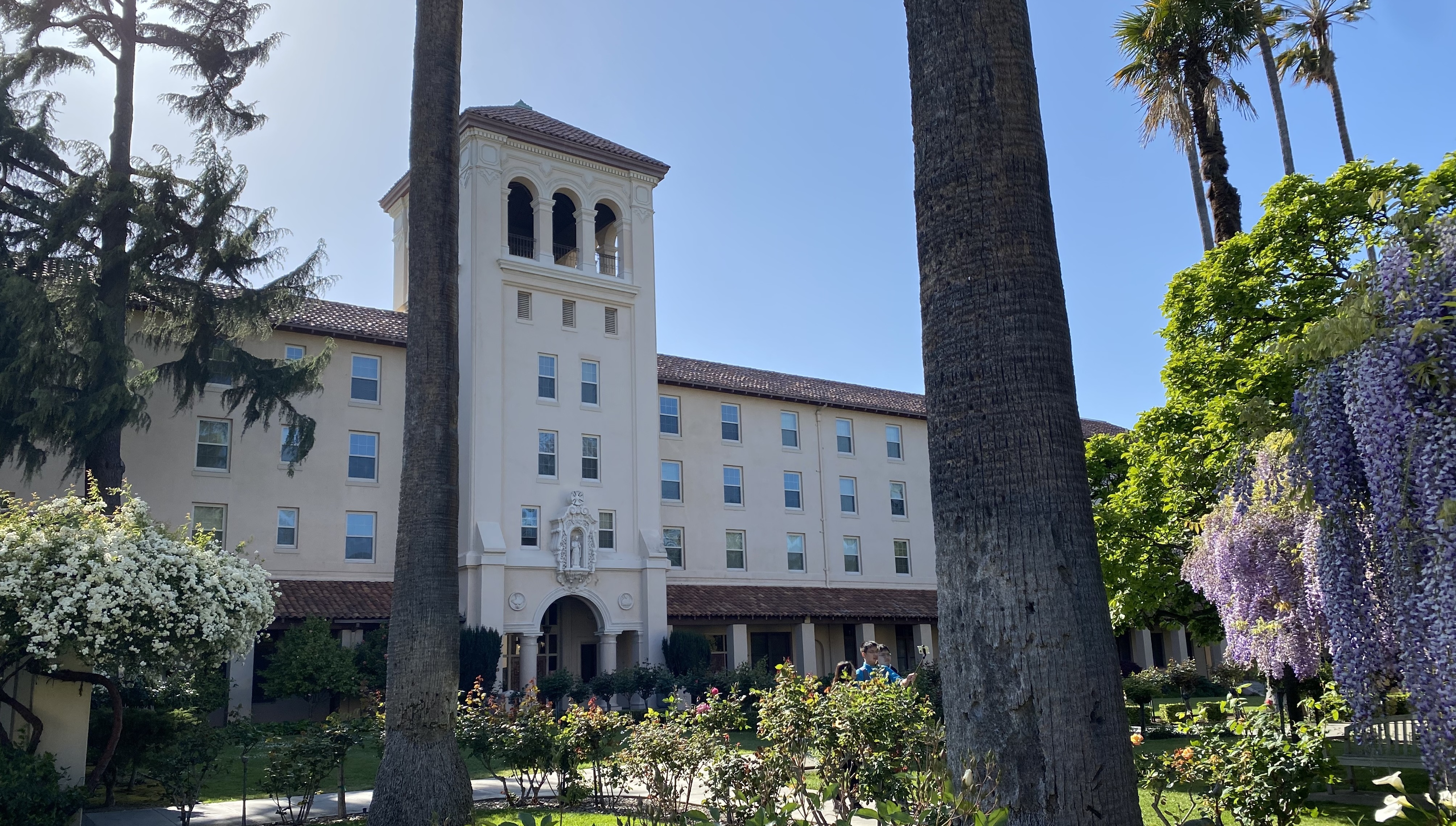
Established by Catholics in 1851, Santa Clara University, in Santa Clara, is the oldest operating university in California.

Catholic education in California began shortly after statehood, led by international bodies of priests and sisters. Later the local diocese began opening schools, usually using teachers from orders of sisters, The first Catholic school was opened in Los Angeles in 1851 by the Sacred Hearts Fathers (Picpus Fathers). The Dominican Sisters operated schools for children of gold miners in Monterey in the 1850s. In Santa Barbara, an experiment in bilingual education in the public school frustrated both the Californios and the Anglos. Tensions were resolved in 1857 when the Catholic set up a parochial school that attracted the Spanish speaking students.

San Francisco early on took leadership in the Catholic school movement, as seen in the careers of archbishops Joseph Sadoc Alemany, Patrick William Riordan and Edward Joseph Hanna. Hanna secured tax exemption for parochial schools.

In 1958, California had 529 Catholic elementary schools with 222,000 students. There were 125 high schools with 49,600 students, and 14 colleges with 13,000 students. In each case, half were in the Los Angeles area, and a fourth in or near San Francisco. By 2011, there were 562 elementary schools with 159,000 students; 116 high schools with 71,700; and 13 colleges with 47,400.

In 2025 the Catholic colleges, include:

- Santa Clara University, a Jesuit institution in the Bay Area; founded 1851
- Notre Dame de Namur University, founded 1851 in Belmont.
- University of San Francisco, founded 1855 by Jesuits
- Saint Mary's College of California, founded 1863 in Moraga
- Loyola Marymount University, founded 1865 in Los Angeles, the largest school; Jesuit tradition.
- Holy Names University founded in 1868 in Oakland; closed in 2023
- Dominican University of California, founded in 1890 in San Rafael.
- Mount Saint Mary's University, Los Angeles, founded 1925
- University of San Diego, founded 1949
- Thomas Aquinas College, founded 1971 in Santa Paula appealing to traditionalists.
- John Paul the Great Catholic University, founded 2003 in Escondido
- University of Sacramento founded in 2005; closed in 2011.

These schools provide a mix of traditional liberal arts education, theological studies, and professional programs. There are also several seminaries.

== Ethnic and racial minorities ==
=== Latinos ===
Mexican Americans have faced a long history of segregation in California schools, particularly in the early 20th century. While there were no explicit laws requiring segregation for Mexican students, local school districts often placed them in separate schools under the guise of "Americanization" programs. These schools emphasized vocational training rather than academic advancement, reinforcing social and economic barriers. Educators considered that the Mexican culture was less conducive to the more intellectual approaches used for Anglo students. Furthermore, most Mexican parents wanted their children protected from Anglo harassment. The key legal challenge to this system was Mendez v. Westminster in 1947, where five Mexican American fathers successfully argued that school segregation was unconstitutional. Following the ruling, Governor Earl Warren signed a law to repeal segregation in schools on June 14, 1947. This case set a precedent for the famous Brown v. Board of Education decision written by Chief Justice Earl Warren in 1954, which ultimately ended legal segregation nationwide.

Beyond legal battles, Mexican American students also faced cultural discrimination, such as biased IQ tests used to justify segregation and social prejudices that framed them as a threat to public health and morality. Over time, activism and legal victories helped dismantle these barriers, leading to greater educational access and integration.

=== Asians ===
Chinese men came in large numbers in the 1860s to work on the railroad. Most planned to make money then return to China. There were few women and very few children before 1900. Anti-Chinese sentiment was strong among the Anglo population and they would not tolerate any integrated public schools. The state supreme court in Tape v. Hurley said the city had to provide schools, so the result was segregated public schools. The government of China was to weak to play any role. Japan was another matter—it was a new powerhouse in Asia, had a military alliance with Britain, defeated Russia in a major war, and controlled Korea and part of China. There were 60,000 Japanese in Hawaii when it was annexed in 1898 and they could freely enter the mainland. Many Japanese farm families were immigrating permanently to California. In 1906 alone, 17,000 arrived, two-thirds from Hawaii. Tokyo was outraged when San Francisco imposed segregation on the 93 Japanese students in the city schools. President Roosevelt intervened and brokered the Gentlemen's Agreement of 1907. It was a compromise by which Japan agreed not to send unskilled workers and the U.S. would not impose segregation.

== Higher education ==
The New England emphasis on public education had an impact in the late 1850s as the Gold Rush frenzy faded. Several colleges were begun. In 1855, the private College of California was established. In 1868 the state acquired it and it became the University of California, Berkeley, the first campus of the University of California to be established.

=== Teacher training ===
After a private normal school closed in San Francisco after only one year, politicians John Swett and Henry B. Janes sought to establish a normal school for San Francisco's public school system, and approached George W. Minns to be the principal for the nascent institution, with Swett as an assistant principal. It began operations in 1857 as the Minns Evening Normal School. In 1861, after its continued success was clear, superintendent Andrew J. Moulder worked to set up a state normal school. Minns Evening Normal School became the California State Normal School in 1862, and is today San Jose State University.

=== University of California system ===
The UC system was officially established in 1868, following the merger of the College of California with the Agricultural, Mining, and Mechanical Arts College. Over time, it expanded to accommodate California’s growing population and educational needs. The system is recognized for its research excellence, with multiple campuses ranked among the top universities globally. It now comprises 10 main campuses:

- UC Berkeley (1868) – The first UC campus.
- UC San Francisco (UCSF) (1873) – A graduate-only campus focused on a medical school and health sciences.
- UC Davis (1905) – Originally an agricultural extension of UC Berkeley, it became a full-fledged campus in 1959.
- UC Los Angeles (UCLA) (1919) – Started as a teacher’s college before expanding into a major research university.
- UC Santa Barbara (1944) – Transitioned from a teacher’s college to a research university.
- UC Riverside (1954) – Originally a citrus research station, it evolved into a full university.
- UC San Diego (1960) – Founded with a strong emphasis on science and technology.
- UC Santa Cruz (1965) – Known for its innovative and interdisciplinary approach to education.
- UC Irvine (1965) – Established to meet the growing demand for higher education in Los Angeles suburbs.
- UC Merced (2005) – The newest campus, created to serve the Central Valley region.

=== California State University ===
The system now consists of 23 campuses and seven off-campus centers. Established in 1960 as part of the California Master Plan for Higher Education, the CSU system has its roots in the California State Normal Schools that were first chartered in 1857. The system began with the Minns Evening Normal School, founded in 1857 by George W. Minns in San Francisco. It was a normal school, an institution that educated future teachers in association with the high school system. It was taken over by the state in 1862 and moved to San Jose and renamed the California State Normal School; it eventually evolved into San Jose State University. Later, other state normal schools were founded at Los Angeles (1882), Chico (1887) and San Diego (1897). Total enrollment grew to 8,100 in 1935; it dropped to 7,900 in 1945, then it soared to 54,600 in 1955, 154,800 in 1965. In 2005 it enrolled 432,800 students, with about 23,000 staff, and 24,000 faculty, at which time it had over two million living alumni.

=== California Community Colleges ===
The 1960 Master Plan for Higher Education clarified the role of community colleges as open-access institutions, distinct from the University of California and California State University systems. The California Community Colleges system now includes 73 community college districts. They operate 116 accredited colleges. It is the largest system of higher education in the United States, and third largest system of higher education in the world, serving more than 1.8 million students.

The system was originally designed by Professor Alexis F. Lange to make the freshman and sophomore course work more accessible, and allow university faculty to concentrate on advanced research. The expectation was the students would then move to a traditional college for years three and four and finally a BA degree. The 1907 Upward Extension Act allowed high schools to offer college-level coursework, enabling students to stay close to home and save money. However the new students had a different plan. Typically they were the first in their family to graduate from high school, and they wanted a better job now. Very few planned on two more years of study to get a BA degree.

The first junior college in California appeared in 1910, when the Fresno Board of Education opened the Collegiate Department of Fresno High School—later named Fresno City College. By 1917, California had sixteen junior colleges, the largest system of junior colleges in the world. The system grew rapidly, especially after World War II, responding to population booms and the educational needs of returning veterans.

In 1947 President Truman's Commission on Higher Education for Democracy emphasized the change in mission from producing an intellectual elite to becoming “the means by which every citizen, youth, and adult, is enabled and encouraged” to pursue higher learning. The term "community college" now replaced "junior college," for the new institutions realized their role should not be to feed established four-year colleges, but rather to serve the community's current needs for more skilled workers. A few, like Modesto Junior College founded in 1917, still use the original name. The mission continually expanded. They quickly began to focus more on vocational training, adult education, and community enrichment to meet local workforce needs and support economic development. To this day they play a key role in promoting social mobility, offering inexpensive local pathways for students from working class backgrounds to gain job skills. Communities large and small depend on them to prepare firefighters, police, mechanics, nurses and office workers for good jobs.

== See also ==
- Bibliography of California history
- List of colleges and universities in California
- California Master Plan for Higher Education
- California State Board of Education
  - California State Superintendent of Public Instruction, works for the State Board
- List of oldest schools in California
- School segregation in California
  - Tape v. Hurley, in 1885 the California Supreme Court ruled the exclusion of a Chinese American student from public school was unlawful.
  - Gordon J. Lau Elementary School Public school in San Francisco for Asian children, founded 1859; still in operation and open to all.
- History of education in the United States
- History of Catholic education in the United States
