= Gentlemen's Agreement of 1908 =

Diplomatic agreement between Canada and Japan

Hayashi-Lemieux Agreement
- Type: Informal agreement
- Signed: 1908
- Effective: 1908
- Expiration: 1928 (stricter agreement); 1946 (abolition)
- Signatories: Japan; Canada
- Languages: English; Japanese

The Gentlemen's Agreement of 1908 (Hayashi-Lemieux Agreement) was an informal diplomatic agreement between Canada and Japan aimed at restricting Japanese immigration to Canada. This was part of broader efforts to address rising anti-Asian sentiment in Canada while maintaining good diplomatic relations between the two countries. In Canada, a "minority fear complex" contributed to rising hostility, culminating in the 1907 Vancouver anti-Asian riots, which further pressured the Canadian government to limit Japanese immigration. The agreement remained in effect until it was superseded by more restrictive immigration policies in the late 1920s which remained in effect until 1949.

== Background ==
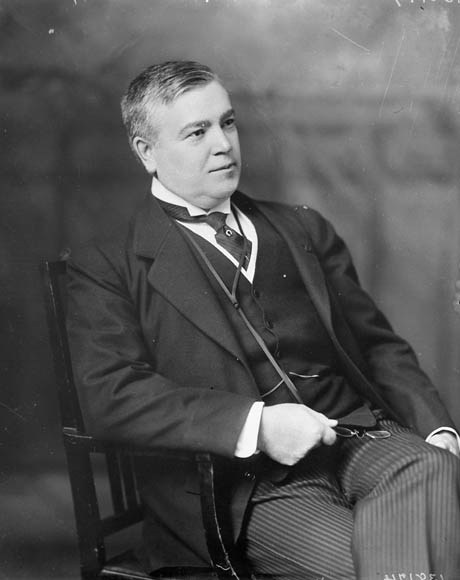
Canadian Diplomat Rodolphe Lemieux

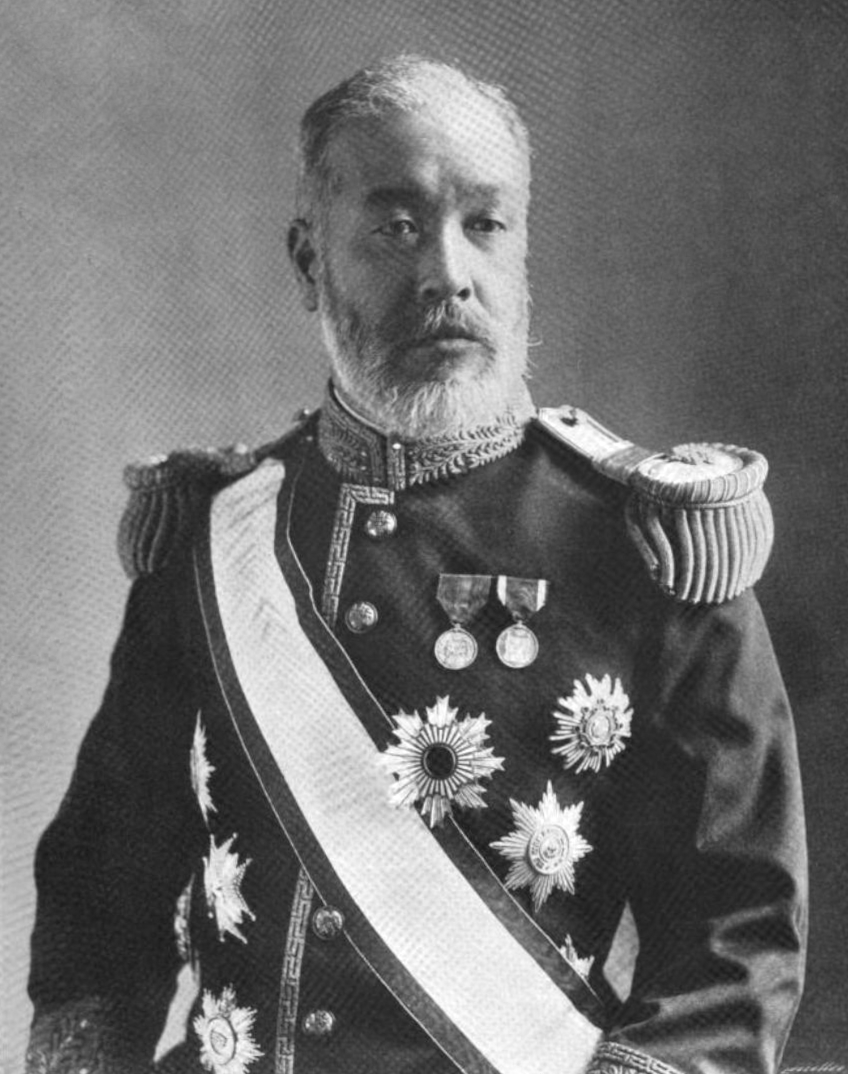
Japanese Diplomat Hayashi Tadasu

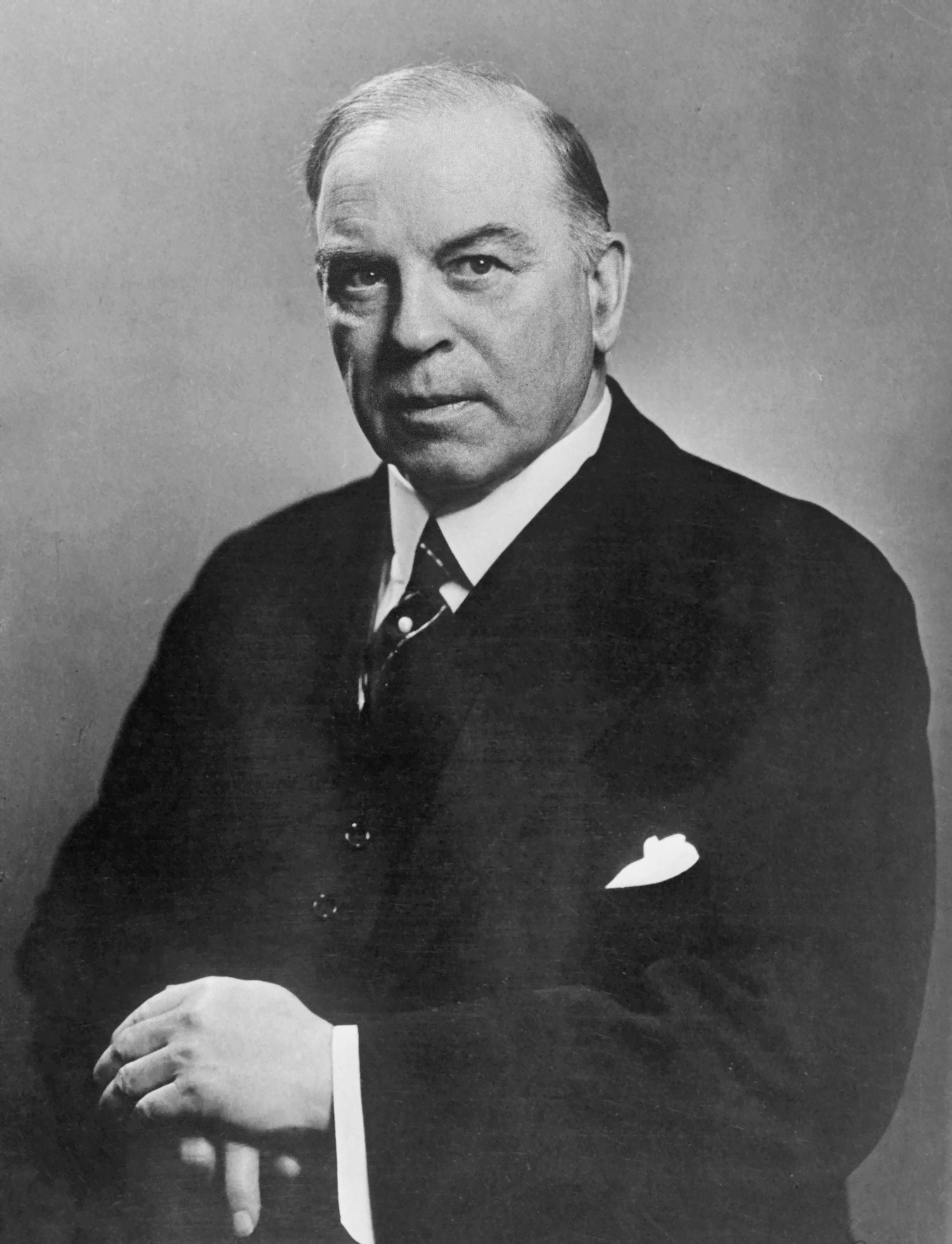
Canadian Prime Minister William Lyon Mackenzie King

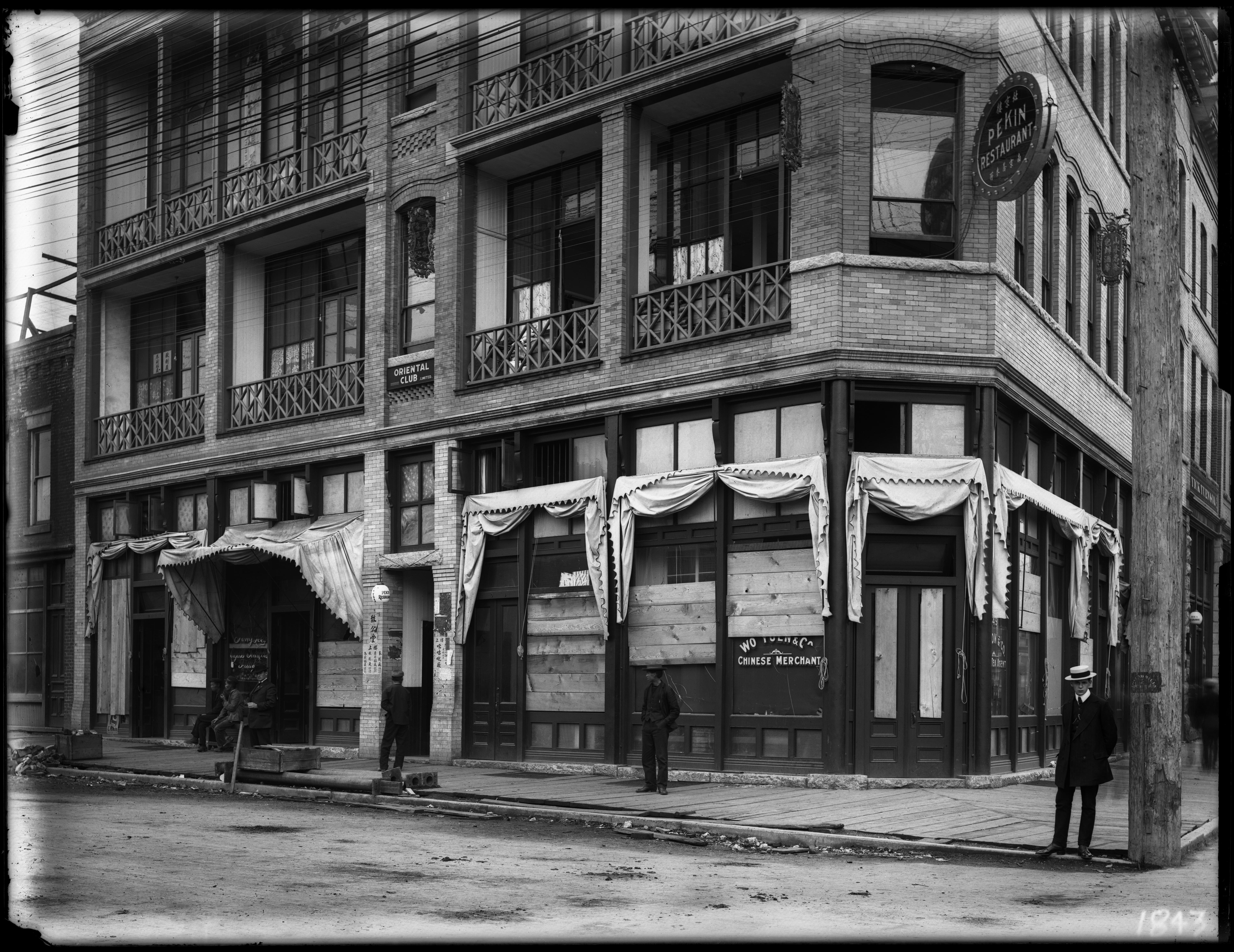
Vandalised storefront in Downtown Vancouver after Anti-Asian riot (1907)

=== Anti-Asian Pacific Race Riots, 1907 ===
The Vancouver Anti-Asian Riot in 1907 showed the intensity of anti-Asian, exclusionary sentiment in Canada and led to the 1908 Gentlemen’s Agreement. On the evening of September 7, 1907, thousands of anti-Asian exclusionists took to the streets of Vancouver, British Columbia in a parade protesting against Asian immigration which evolved into a violent anti-Asian riot. The parade was an attempt to express growing fears over what exclusionists saw as the phenomenon of the “Yellow Peril”, prompted in part by the fact that Canada had experienced a large influx of Asian immigrants over the past year.

The Vancouver Anti-Asian Riot was spearheaded by the Vancouver Trades and Labour Council as the founder of a local branch of the Asiatic Exclusion League (AEL) in July 1907. The notion of an anti-Asian parade to rally exclusionary support was proposed at AEL meetings as part of the league's mandate to agitate for the total prohibition of Asian immigration as a means to prevent Asian Canadians from demographically dominating the province. Following a well-attended visit from Prince Fushimi of Japan in late August of 1907, the AEL called a meeting on August 23, 1907 to officially host the anti-Asian parade to bring attention to their concerns regarding Japanese immigration. The parade was advertised in local newspapers and the exclusionary movement drew support from local politicians, businesses and religious figures.

The parade started at 7 pm and hosted many AEL officials, and international figures, eventually culminating in speeches at the Vancouver City Hall pushing for provincial and federal governments to prohibit Asian immigration. However, the situation developed into a violent riot against the local Chinese and Japanese community resulting in widespread injuries and property damage totalling approximately $40,000. The riots destroyed roughly 59 Japanese properties, and rioters committed arson on a Japanese-language school as Japanese Canadians resisted the violence against their shops and homes. The most violent parts of the riots ended overnight at 3 am and the Laurier government eventually compensated Japanese Canadians for the damages.

In reaction to the riots, the Canadian federal government launched a commission in November of 1907 to further investigate the causes behind anti-Asian sentiment. The investigation discovered that a Japanese government affiliated immigration agency was issuing a large number of Japanese passports. This discovery was controversial to Canadian politicians because they believed that there had been a prior implicit agreement between Japan and Canada to limit the number of Japanese passports for immigration into Canada. The Gentlemen's Agreement to limit Japanese passports to Canada was reached two months after the commission.

=== US influence ===
==== Teddy Roosevelt's foreign policy agenda ====
Theodore Roosevelt's (1858–1919) foreign policy agenda advanced a doctrine of “muscular diplomacy,” asserting U.S. dominance and influence on the global stage. Roosevelt's foreign policy operated on the principle that international politics were inherently conflict-driven and violent, utilizing spheres of influence to influence and exercise control over the global balance of power. Regarding the dynamics of the Far East, Roosevelt viewed Japan as the only East Asian nation possessing both the military strength and political legitimacy to counter Russian expansion, solidifying the nation’s power and influence on the international stage.

This perspective worked in tandem with prevailing anti-Chinese sentiments, which stemmed from transnational debates on race and immigration into American territories, and gradually evolved into exclusionary policies targeting Asian migrants in white settler societies. The move toward cooperation and policy coordination extended beyond shared rhetoric, actively shaping restrictive measures against the growing Asian diaspora migrating to the Americas beginning in the late 19th century. By the summer of 1907, this exclusionary shift was further solidified with the rise of the Asiatic Exclusion League (AEL), whose influence had already spread from the US to Canada. The AEL's impact was particularly evident in its Vancouver chapter, which played a significant role in the anti-Asian riots that broke out in the city later that same year, linking Canada’s domestic immigration concerns to broader Orientalist anxieties within the region.

In response to the perceived "Yellow Peril," President Roosevelt sought to mobilize a unified defensive strategy, as represented by the Great White Fleet tour in 1908, during which the US had indicated to members of the Canadian parliament that the fleet’s journey through the Pacific was in the interests of Canada and Australia, as well as the US. This sixteen-ship fleet was intended not only to assert US naval prowess on the world stage, but also to reinforce white supremacist ideology in the face of Japan's growing influence. These events laid the groundwork for the subsequent Gentlemen's Agreements between Canada, the US, and Japan; the agreements were allegedly drafted and negotiated separately, and Canada's version was signed three days after that of the US, having been finalized within less than a week.

==== Minority fear complex ====
Following the Russo-Japanese War, Japan's rise as a global power was acknowledged by most European nations. In California, nationalist propaganda surged after the 1906 San Francisco earthquake, spreading fears that the Japanese population boom in the U.S. through birth would overtake that of the Caucasian majority. While birth rates were indeed higher among Japanese migrant communities, this was primarily due to sociological factors, including but not limited to residential concentration in rural areas with naturally higher population growth, improved economic conditions compared to their previous circumstances in Japan, and a younger migrant demographic resulting in lower death rates.

This phenomenon, often referred to as the "minority fear complex," has historically been directed at minority populations within majority nations, where the dominant group perceives the next-largest minority as a threat. Similar anti-Asian sentiments were also simultaneously on the rise in Canada, culminating in the aforementioned Vancouver Riots the following year in 1907. The consequent diplomatic talks regarding the Gentlemen's Agreement and Japanese immigration by the Canadian Prime Minister largely blamed the Japanese migrant community, promoting the dichotomy of unassimilable Japanese migrants as the main cause of the riots, while simultaneously fearing the socioeconomic competition they posed due to their efficient integration into Canadian society.

== Outline of the agreement ==
The early 20th century saw increasing Japanese immigration to Canada, particularly to British Columbia, where many Japanese immigrants worked in industries such as fishing, logging, and agriculture. This influx sparked hostility from white labourers who viewed Japanese workers as a threat to their jobs and livelihoods. The agreement was a federal response to this rising anti-Asian sentiment in British Columbia, where white workers and politicians expressed fears of economic competition and racial mixing.

Negotiated by Canadian Minister of Labour Rodolphe Lemieux and Japanese Foreign Minister Tadasu Hayashi, and signed on January 28, 1908 the agreement was established in the wake of rising anti-Asian sentiment in British Columbia, which culminated in the 1907 Vancouver anti-Asian riots, where white mobs attacked Chinese and Japanese businesses and homes. Unlike other anti-Asian exclusionary laws which had been harshly implemented, such as the Chinese Immigration Act (1885) and its later amendments, the Canadian government sought a more diplomatic solution with Japan to avoid straining bilateral relations.

Under the terms of this agreement, the Japanese government voluntarily limited the issuance of passports to male labourers and domestic servants to 400 annually. However, the agreement permitted certain categories of individuals to immigrate without restriction, including returning residents and their immediate family members (wives, children, and parents), individuals employed in personal or domestic services by Japanese residents in Canada, labourers approved by the Canadian government, and agricultural workers contracted by Japanese landholders in Canada. This arrangement allowed Canada to address domestic pressures to curb Japanese immigration while maintaining amicable diplomatic relations with Japan, which sought to avoid the indignity of formal exclusionary policies. Notably, the agreement did not restrict the immigration of wives of Japanese immigrants, where marriages were arranged via photographs, enabling many Japanese women to join their husbands in Canada. In 1928, the agreement was amended to further reduce the number of passports issued to male labourers and domestic servants to 150 per year.

== Consequences ==
=== Alternative forms of immigration ===
Despite the restriction of 400 Japanese immigrants per year imposed by the Canada-Japan Gentlemen’s Agreement of 1907-1908, Japanese immigration to Canada continued through various alternative pathways.

==== Immigration through the United States ====
One of the pathways was immigration to Canada through Hawaii. Initially, many Japanese labourers migrated to Hawaii in search of employment opportunities. However, after the United States annexed Hawaii in 1898, some sought to move to the United States mainland or Canada to find work. Since the Japanese government was responsible for restricting direct immigration to Canada, Japanese immigrants already in the United States were beyond their jurisdiction. This allowed more than 50% of permanent Japanese immigrants to enter Canada through Hawaii, increasing Japanese arrivals in Canada before stricter immigration regulations were imposed. It later led to the employment of the Continuous Journey Regulation in 1908, when Canada closed off the immigration routes from Hawaii, restricting Japanese immigration.

==== Immigration through family sponsorships and picture brides ====
Another avenue for continued immigration was through family sponsorships. Japanese men who had already settled in Canada were able to sponsor their wives and children, facilitating the migration of family members despite broader restrictions on labourers. Since the agreement did not impose restrictions on the spouses of established Japanese immigrants, it led to the emergence of "picture brides." Many men arranged marriages through the exchange of photographs where they would choose their bride. Once the marriage was officially registered in Japan, the bride could legally immigrate to Canada. This allowed more than 6,000 "picture brides" to immigrate to Canada by 1924, resulting in the end of the "picture bride" system by 1928 as the Canadian government contained the quota to 150 immigrants per year.

== See also ==
- Gentlemen's Agreement of 1907
