= Ormonde, California =

Ormonde was a gold mining community located about 3 1/2 miles east of the town of Washington on present day Maybert Road on the north side of the South Yuba River. The Ormonde townsite is best accessed with a four-wheel drive vehicle with good clearance.

== Origins ==
Ormonde was founded in 1886-7 by the Washington Mining Company as a company town to support its eponymous mine. The name roughly means Golden World. Alphonse Tregidgo, the company’s Superintendent, caused an entire new town to be built, containing a store, saloon, boarding house, lodging house and other buildings. An election district was quickly created and nine people voted in the 1888 presidential election. The election district was abolished by the Nevada County Board of Supervisors in 1892 and Ormonde citizens had to vote in Washington. Ormonde never had a post office or public school house. A newspaper reported that a "liberal reward is still offered" to the mother of the first child born in Ormonde.

The town was occasionally snowed in during the winter. As one paper noted, "Ormonde [has] been shut out from the world for over two months. Yet supplies were laid in last fall sufficient to keep everything going, and the people are making the host of the situation." A new road to the town of Washington soon followed and Ormonde was connected to Washington by competing stage lines. A new steel bridge across Canyon Creek was completed in 1895 and served the area until it was replaced in 2017. Plans to build a good wagon road to connect with the Towle Bros. logging railroad at Omega a few miles to the south never materialized.

The town was plagued by fires. The Chinese Quarter was destroyed by fire in May 1888. The next year, a major fire destroyed a lot of the area around Ormonde, including the Lindsey boarding house and mill. The hotel was destroyed by fire in late 1893. References to the town, as opposed to its mines, peter out by the mid 90s. The historical plaque placed by the Clampers at the site states in part that "by 1897 it was nearly totally abandoned."

== Alphonse Tregidgo ==
Apart from founding Ormonde, Mr. Tregidgo (1858–1913) had many other talents. Reportedly descended from a wealthy and titled English family, he arrived in Nevada County in the 1880s. He was an inventor of mining equipment, receiving a patent for an amalgamator and pulp distributor for use in quartz mills. He dabbled in horticulture, importing 500 wild plum trees from Southern California. He built the first hydroelectric plant in Nevada County on the South Yuba River and became the first president of the Nevada County Electric Power Company, which eventually grew into the Pacific Gas and Electric Company. The headline over his eulogy in the Union is "Father of P. G. & E. Co. Is Dead."

== Mining ==
Ormonde was located on a belt of quartz veins lying north of the South Yuba River. Principal quartz mines included the Washington, the Don, the Dee, the Dal, the Ocean Star and the German. Soon after the town was established, a 12 foot high log dam was built in the South Yuba River and connected to Ormond by nearly a mile of ditch and flume, to provide power for the Washington Company mines. The Company then erected a 20 stamp mill at the Washington and a 10 stamp mill at the nearby Bluebell to process the ore. Initial mining reports were promising, but by the early 90s, the mines were dormant, probably due to the financial difficulties of the owner, the mysterious Baron J. H. von Schroeder, who lived in the Bay Area. By 1897, under a new superintendent, R. V. Halton, the Washington Mine was being put back in operation.

The Ocean Star Mine, owned by M. D. Cooley, was active at the beginning of the 20th century. In 1913, he sold mine to a San Francisco company that, under Superintendent M. N. Melrose, invested heavily in new improvements, adding 10 new stamps to the mill, considerably deepening the tunnel and adding water power.

The German Mine was likewise shut down because of a lack of capital around the beginning of the 20th century. New investors appeared in 1908 and improvements were made.

Eventually, these and other mines in the area, and the townsite, were acquired by the Columbia Consolidated Mines Company which operated them well into the 20th century.

In addition to gold, the Ormonde area also contained deposits of copper and chrome.

== Ormonde today ==
Nothing readily visible remains of the town. The Golden Quartz Picnic Area, maintained by the Tahoe National Forest, is located on the former townsite, which is marked with a historical plaque.
