= Brass Wire Bar, California =

Former settlement in Nevada County, CA, US

Coordinates: 39.3594°N 120.8015°W

Brass Wire Bar is a former settlement in Nevada County, California. Brass Wire Bar is located on the South Yuba River, across from Washington. It was a mining camp; Chinese miners worked the site in 1880. About $50,000 worth of gold was found there.
