= Gordon J. Lau Elementary School =

School in San Francisco, California

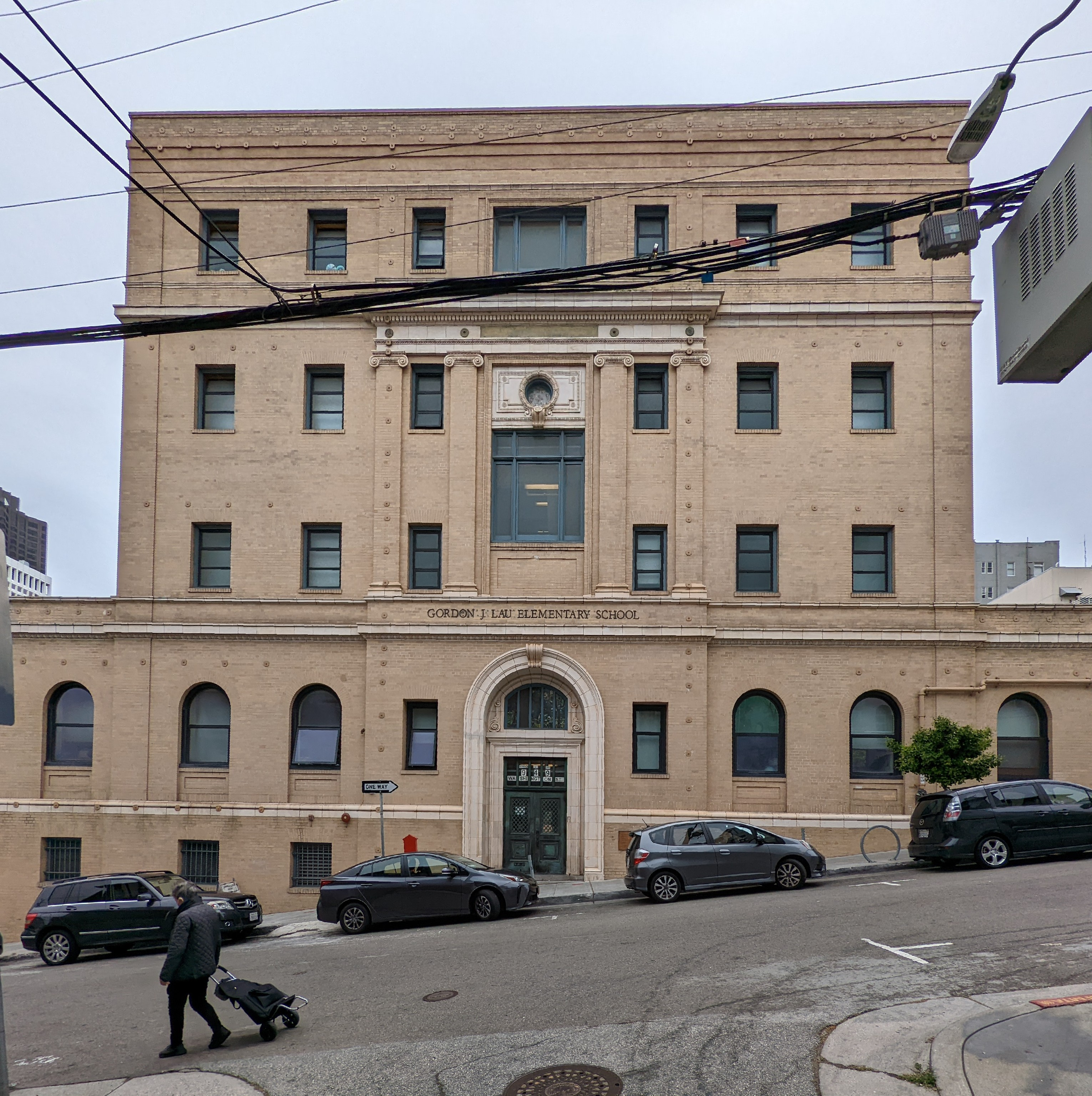
- Washington Street entrance

Location
- 950 Clay Street; Chinatown; San Francisco, California; United States
- Coordinates: 37.794588°N 122.408870°W

Information
- Former name: The Chinese School (1859–1906); Oriental Public School (1906–24); Commodore Stockton Elementary School (1924–98)
- Language: English, Chinese
- Feeder schools: Chinese Primary School
- Feeder to: Marina Middle School
- Website: sfusd.edu/school/gordon-j-lau-elementary-school

Gordon J. Lau Elementary School (simplified Chinese: 刘贵明小学; traditional Chinese: 劉貴明小學), founded as the Chinese School and was once named Oriental Public School, was a public school located in Chinatown, San Francisco, California. It was initially set up in 1859 as a segregated school for schoolchildren of Chinese (and later Japanese and Korean) descent, part of the growing anti-Chinese sentiment in the United States that arose in the late 1800s. The school has been renamed a number of times, most recently in 1998 to its current name in honor of the city's first Chinese-American supervisor.

== History ==
A small private school was briefly mentioned as having started in late 1852 in a letter to the editors of the Daily Alta California, warmly concluding "if the Chinese can be induced to settle permanently among us, that in time our country will be greatly benefitted by their accession." A fundraising campaign was started six months later for a Chinese Mission to educate Chinese students in machinery and western religion.

In September 1859, the Chinese School was opened as a segregated public school for Chinese students in San Francisco's Chinatown. "Negroes, Mongolians, and Indians" were legally barred from attending public schools by a state law passed in 1860 which allowed the establishment of segregated schools instead. Prior to this in 1858, the state's first State Superintendent of Schools, Andrew Moulder, spoke about segregation of the state's schools. "If this attempt to force Africans, Chinese, and Diggers into our white schools is persisted, it must result in the ruin of our schools." Attendance was sporadic and low for several years afterwards as many children did not attend school.

One reason for the low attendance rate may have been the lack of control the Chinese Americans had over school administration. Claiming a lack of funds, San Francisco Board of Education closed the school after only four months of operation, only to reopen it after the white community protested about integrating their schools.

San Francisco segregated its Chinese school children from 1859 until 1871, when the city refused to fund any more classes for them. The California Political Code had been amended in 1866 to restrict enrollment in public schools to "all white children, between five and twenty-one years of age" (§53), and required that "children of African or Mongolian descent, and Indian children not living under the care of white persons" be educated in segregated schools (§57) which were to be separate but equal (§59). In 1870, the law was again rewritten to drop the requirement to provide any education for Chinese children, limiting the segregated separate but equal schools to "children of African descent, and Indian children." San Francisco Superintendent Denman cut funding from the Chinese School, which closed on March 1, 1871. After it closed, Chinese parents often sent their children to church schools or hired private teachers.

=== Tape v. Hurley ===
What, then, shall be said if the doors of our schoolhouses are to be opened to admit children reared in such an atmosphere? What, indeed, shall be said of the proposition to educate them separate and apart from children of other races, and how can we with consistency deny them this right? Speaking no language but the Chinese, born and nurtured in filth and degradation, it is scarcely probable that any serious attempt could be made to mingle them with the other children of our public schools without kindling a blaze of revolution in our midst. And again, by what right, constitutional or statutory, can we set apart separate schools and a separate fund for their education or maintenance? ... Meanwhile, guard well the doors of our public schools, that they do not enter. For, however hard and stern such a doctrine may sound, it is but the enforcement of the law of self-preservation, the inculcation of the doctrine of true humanity, and an integral part of the enforcement of the iron rule of right by which we hope presently to prove that we can justly and practically defend ourselves from this invasion of Mongolian barbarism.

—The Report of the Special Committee of the Board of Supervisors of San Francisco, on the Condition of the Chinese Quarter of that City (1885)

In 1880, the Political Code was modified to lift the restriction of enrollment to white students (§1662) and the sections requiring separate but equal (§1671) segregated schools (§1669) were repealed. With the change to the Code, in 1884, Joseph and Mary Tape challenged San Francisco's practice by enrolling their daughter, Mamie, in the all-white Spring Valley School. After the school refused to admit Mamie, the Tapes sued the school district in Tape v. Hurley and won. SFUSD appealed the lower court's decision to the California Supreme Court, where the justices sustained the verdict of the lower court. The case guaranteed the right of children born to Chinese parents to public education.

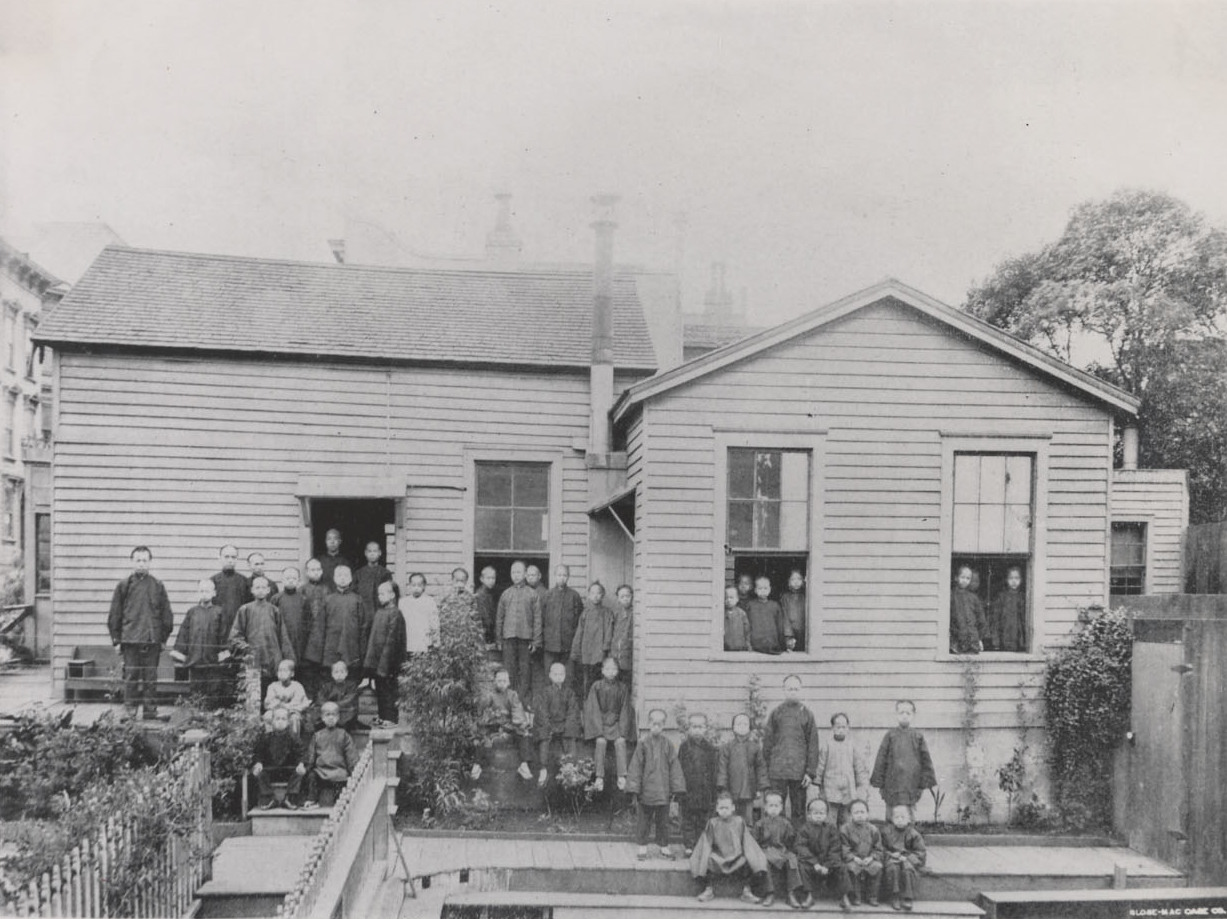
Chinese Primary School, 916 Clay

In the wake of Tape v. Hurley, Andrew Moulder, the Superintendent of Public Schools in San Francisco, sent a telegram to Representative W.B. May of the California State Assembly on March 4, 1885 urging passage of bills to reestablish segregated schools. "Without such action I have every reason to believe that some of our classes will be inundated by Mongolians. Trouble will follow." May responded by pushing through Assembly Bill 268, which once again allowed the establishment of "separate schools for children of Mongolian or Chinese descent. When such separate schools are established, Chinese or Mongolian children must not be admitted into any other schools."

As a result, the San Francisco District decided to set up a separate Chinese Primary School the next year. Chinese Primary School had three classes with an enrollment of 90 students in 1895. The first location was at the corner of Jackson and Stone, but the school was later moved to 916 Clay. The Primary School was mentioned in an 1896 San Francisco Call article profiling the kindergarten at the First Chinese Baptist Church.

The building at 916 Clay was destroyed in the April 1906 earthquake and subsequent fire, and a temporary building was erected at Joice and Clay to continue education.

=== Oriental Public School ===
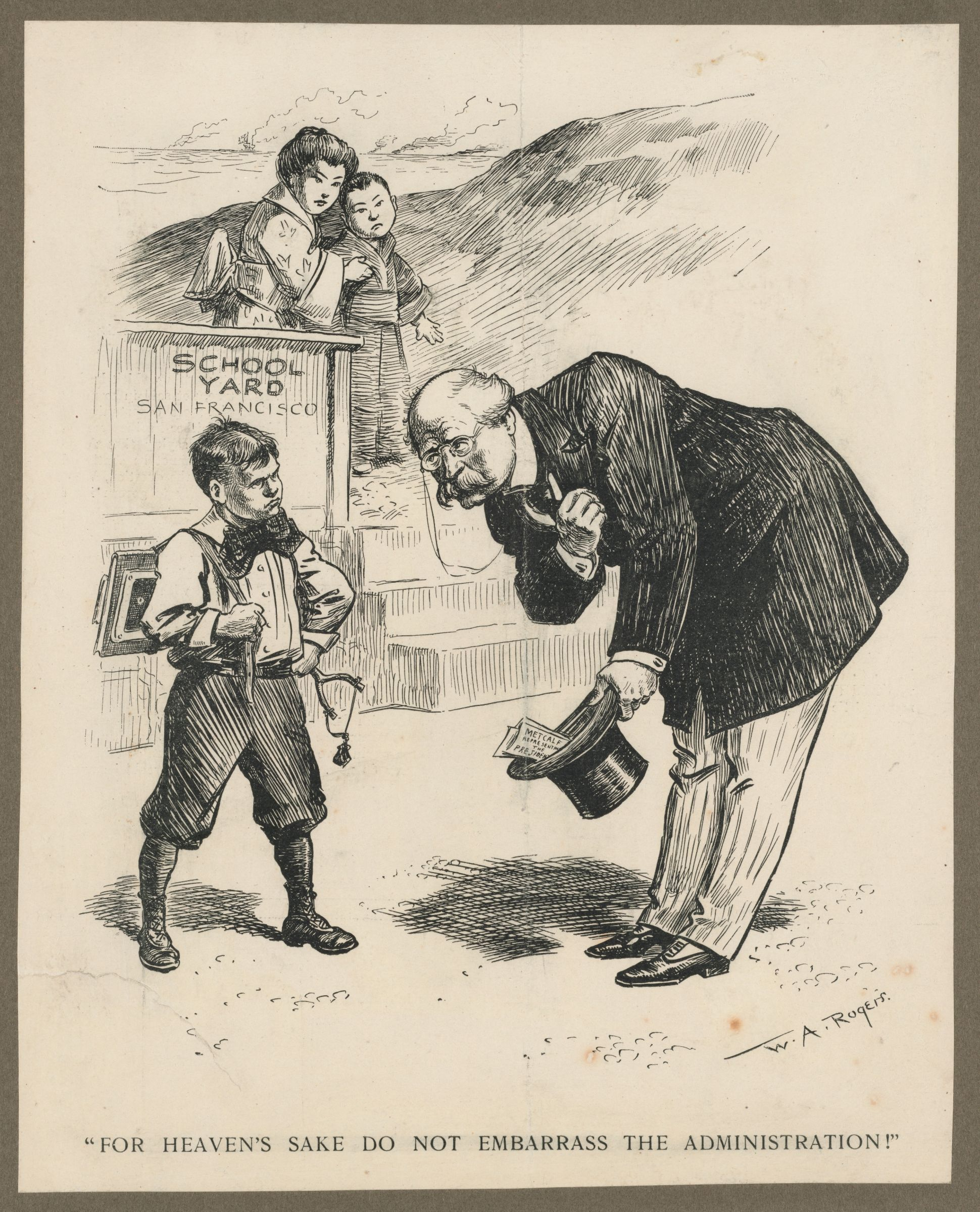
W.A. Rogers cartoon for Harper's Weekly (10 Nov 1906), captioned "For Heaven's Sake Do Not Embarrass the Administration!"

On October 11, 1906, amidst agitation for a Japanese exclusion law like the 1882 Chinese Exclusion Act, San Francisco Board of Education renamed the Chinese School the "Oriental Public School", and ordered the city's 93 Japanese school children to attend it along with students of Chinese and Korean ancestry. The Japanese government protested that this violated a treaty signed in 1894, which guaranteed the right of Japanese immigration to the United States. President Theodore Roosevelt invited Mayor Eugene Schmitz to Washington, D.C. to resolve the matter. The resulting Gentlemen's Agreement of 1907 overturned the board of education's decision, overturned the segregation of Japanese-American school children, and excluded Japanese laborers from entering the United States.

The building at the present site, designed by Albert Pissis, was completed in 1915 with an entrance on Washington, between Stockton and Powell. Local residents objected to the site, as it outside the traditional boundary of Chinatown, west of Stockton.

The Oriental School was renamed Commodore Stockton School on April 1, 1924. The Chinese American Citizen Alliance had requested that the name be changed to the Harding Primary School, stating a dislike of implied inferiority in the term "Oriental". Their request was ignored. Across Washington, the Commodore Stockton School Annex opened in 1924, designed by Angus McSweeney. The first Chinese teacher, named in 1927, was Alice Fong Yu, who initially assisted the principal with translation duties to interact with parents and students. Students were not permitted to speak Chinese in school or on the playground.

=== Recent developments ===
In 1998 Commodore Stockton Elementary School was renamed Gordon J. Lau Elementary School in honor of the first Chinese American elected to the Board of Supervisors, Gordon Lau.

The San Francisco Unified School District finally repealed the regulation requiring students of Chinese and Korean heritage to attend the Oriental School in a largely symbolic gesture in 2017, more than a hundred years after the 1906 controversy.

== See also ==
- History of Chinese Americans in San Francisco
- List of Jim Crow law examples by state
