= Tape v. Hurley =

1885 California Supreme Court case

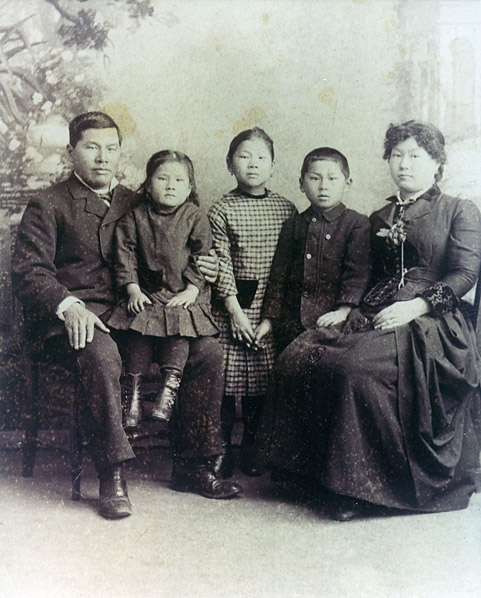
- Joseph, Emily, Mamie, Frank, and Mary Tape
- Court: California Supreme Court
- Full case name: Mamie Tape, an Infant, by her Guardian ad Litem, Joseph Tape v. Jennie M.A. Hurley, et al
- Decided: March 1885
- Citation: 66 Cal. 473 (1885)

Court membership
- Judges sitting: Robert F. Morrison, John Sharpstein, James D. Thornton, Milton H. Myrick, Samuel B. McKee, Elisha W. McKinstry, Erskine M. Ross

Case opinions
- Decision by: Sharpstein
- Concurrence: Morrison, Thornton, Myrick, McKee, McKinstry, Ross

Tape v. Hurley, 66 Cal. 473, (1885) was a landmark court case in the California Supreme Court in which the Court found the exclusion of a Chinese American student from public school based on her ancestry unlawful. The case effectively ruled that minority children were entitled to attend public school in California. After the Court's decision, San Francisco Superintendent of Schools, Andrew J. Moulder, urged the California state assembly to pass new state legislation which enabled the establishment of segregated schools under the separate but equal doctrine, like the later Plessy v. Ferguson (1896). The establishment of the new school marked the continued segregation in the education system in California.

Tape v. Hurley case was brought by the Tape family, who were Chinese immigrants with an American-born child, in the wake of increasing anti-Chinese sentiments in California after the passage of the Chinese Exclusion Act in 1882. Joseph Tape and Mary Tape were informed that their daughter, Mamie Tape, was denied admission to Spring Valley School due to her ancestry. In 1885, Joseph Tape filed a lawsuit on behalf of his daughter in the local Court to force the San Francisco Board of Education to allow his daughter to attend the public school near home.

Tape v. Hurley is widely regarded as the starting point when Asian Americans began challenging school segregation and educational inequality. The result of the case gave greater legal foundations for eliminating segregation in the school system later on. Still, it was not until the mid-twenty century when minorities in California won the victory on the path of fighting for school desegregation.

== History ==
In September 1859, the Chinese School was opened as a public school for Chinese students in San Francisco's Chinatown. Chinese students were legally barred from attending other public schools in San Francisco.

San Francisco established and operated the segregated Chinese School from 1859 until 1870, when the law was amended to drop the requirement to educate Chinese children entirely. In 1871, San Francisco quietly cut funding for the Chinese School, and the school subsequently closed. As a result, Chinese parents often sent their children to church schools or hired private teachers.

In 1884, Joseph and Mary Tape challenged San Francisco's practice by enrolling their daughter, Mamie, in the all-white Spring Valley School at 1451 Jackson Street. After the school refused to admit Mamie, the Tapes sued the school district in Tape v. Hurley and won. San Francisco School District appealed the lower court's decision to the California Supreme Court, where the justices sustained the lower court's verdict. The case guaranteed the right of children born to Chinese parents to public education. In 1885, the San Francisco School District set up a separate Chinese Primary School; the "Chinese School" was later renamed the "Oriental School," so that Chinese, Korean, and Japanese students could be assigned to the school. In response to the establishment of the new segregated Chinese School, Mary Tape wrote a letter and argued her daughter's right to be educated in the public school near home.

== Background ==
=== Discrimination against Chinese immigrants ===
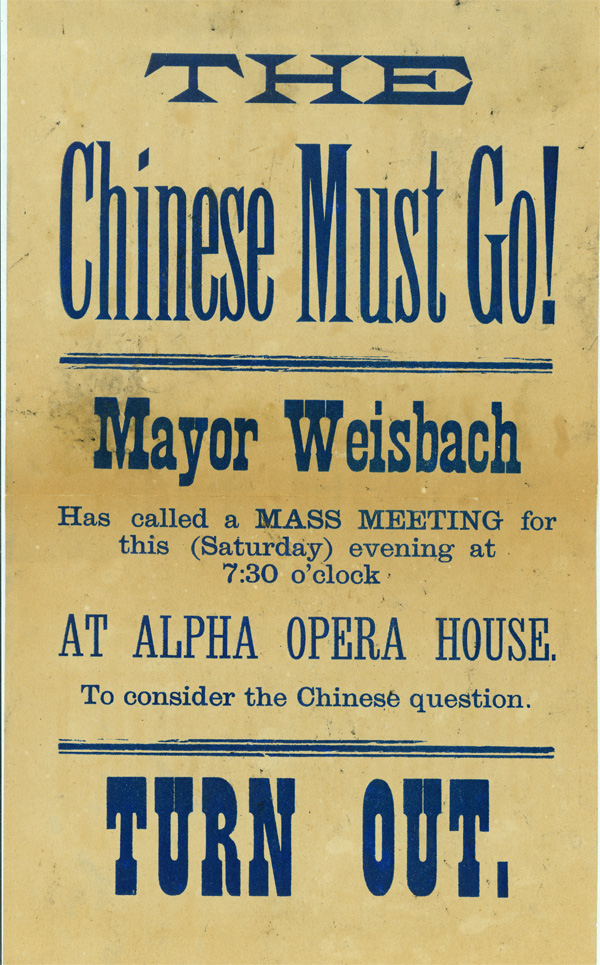
Anti-Chinese sentiment, 1885

Chinese immigration started from the California Gold Rush in the 1840s when many Chinese immigrants hailed from South China to California to try their luck. Most Chinese immigrants were young males with poor financial backgrounds working on mining and railroad constructions. Chinese immigrants were seen as a threat to the white-dominated labor market due to their strong motivations to work. Protest, violence, and harassment toward Chinese immigrants intensified in 1850, and Chinese workers were subsequently excluded from white-dominated unions. The conflicts between Chinese and whites were at their peak in the 1870s, when Chinese workers were seen as the primary reasons behind massive layoffs and poor economic conditions in California. Hundreds of anti-Chinese riots and protests broke out in the 1870s, and such sentiments of hatred led to legal discrimination against Chinese immigrants extending throughout the latter half of the nineteenth century. Despite anti-Chinese feelings in the United States, the population of Chinese immigrants grew steadily from 1850 to 1880. Until 1880, there were about 105,000 Chinese immigrants in America.

Starting from 1870, state and local law placed a myriad of social and economic restrictions on Chinese immigrants. The Page Act of 1875 was the first restrictive federal immigration law that effectively prohibited Chinese women from entering the United States. In May 1882, the United States Congress passed the Chinese Exclusion Act, banning all immigration from China and barring all Chinese immigrants from naturalization. In 1891, California explicitly enacted the state law: "The coming of Chinese person into the States, whether subjects of the Chinese Empire or otherwise, is prohibited." During the progressive era, the politicians of both the Democratic and Republican parties supported the Chinese Exclusion Act. In 1943, Congress repealed the exclusion laws and permitted 105 Chinese to enter each year. It was not until 1965 when all restrictions of entry were lifted.

=== State legislation ===
The legislation in the State of California prompted tremendous changes in the education policies toward minority students from 1850 to 1880.

==== Prior to 1855 ====
The earliest law establishing public education ("Common Schools") in California was passed in 1851 and divided state funding "by the whole number of children in the State, between the ages of five and eighteen years" without specifying race (Article II, §1). It was repealed and replaced by an 1852 law which also lacked racial restrictions.

==== From 1855 to 1866 ====
Section 68. Negroes, Mongolians, and Indians, shall not be admitted into the Public Schools; provided, that upon the application of the parents or Guardians of ten or more such colored children, made in writing to the Trustees of any district, said Trustees shall establish a separate School for the education of Negroes, Mongolians, and Indians, and use the Public School funds for the support of the same; and, provided, further, that the Trustees of any School District may establish a separate School, or provide for the education of any less number of Negroes, Mongolians, and Indians, and use the Public School funds for the support of the same, whenever in their judgment it may be necessary for said Public Schools.

— An Act supplementary to and amendatory of the Act of April sixth, eighteen hundred and sixty-three, entitled an Act to provide for the maintenance and supervision of Common Schools (March 22, 1864)

Growing anti-Chinese sentiments accelerates the changes of racial restrictions in law. The superseding 1855 Act to establish Common Schools counted only "the number of white children in each county between the ages of four and eighteen years" (§3, 12, 18) and allowed the establishment of a school upon "the petition of fifty heads of white families" (§22). In 1860, California amended the 1855 law to bar "Negroes, Mongolians, and Indians" from public schools, and granted the California State Superintendent of Public Instruction, then Andrew J. Moulder, the authority to withhold state funds from districts violating the amended code. The legislation allowed the establishment of segregated schools (§8). The establishment of segregated schools was reiterated in the 1863 law (§68), when the term "Common Schools" was replaced by "Public Schools" and reinforced in 1864, when a requirement was added that a petition by the guardians of "ten or more colored children" was needed to establish a segregated school (§13).

==== From 1866 to 1880 ====
In 1866, the law was rewritten specifically to restrict enrollment in public schools to "all white children, between five and twenty-one years of age" (§53), and required that "children of African or Mongolian descent, and Indian children not living under the care of white persons" be educated in segregated schools (§57), with an exception made for the enrollment of "half-breed Indian children, and Indian children who live in white families or under guardianship of white persons" into public schools upon a majority vote of the local school board (§56). As a last resort, the education of "children, other than white children" was permitted in public schools "provided, that a majority of the parents of the children attending such school make no objection, in writing" if there was no other means of educating them (§58). The law now required separate but equal schools (§59). When the law was rewritten in 1870, the restriction of students to white children was retained (§53), and segregated schools were only provided for "children of African descent, and Indian children" (§56), dropping the requirement to educate Chinese children entirely. The potential exceptions for the enrollment of Indian children living with white families or with the written consent of a majority of other parents also disappeared. The separate but equal clause survived (§57).

In 1880, the Political Code was modified to lift the restriction of enrollment to white students (§1662) and the sections requiring separate but equal (§1671) segregated schools (§1669) were repealed.

=== Chinese school ===
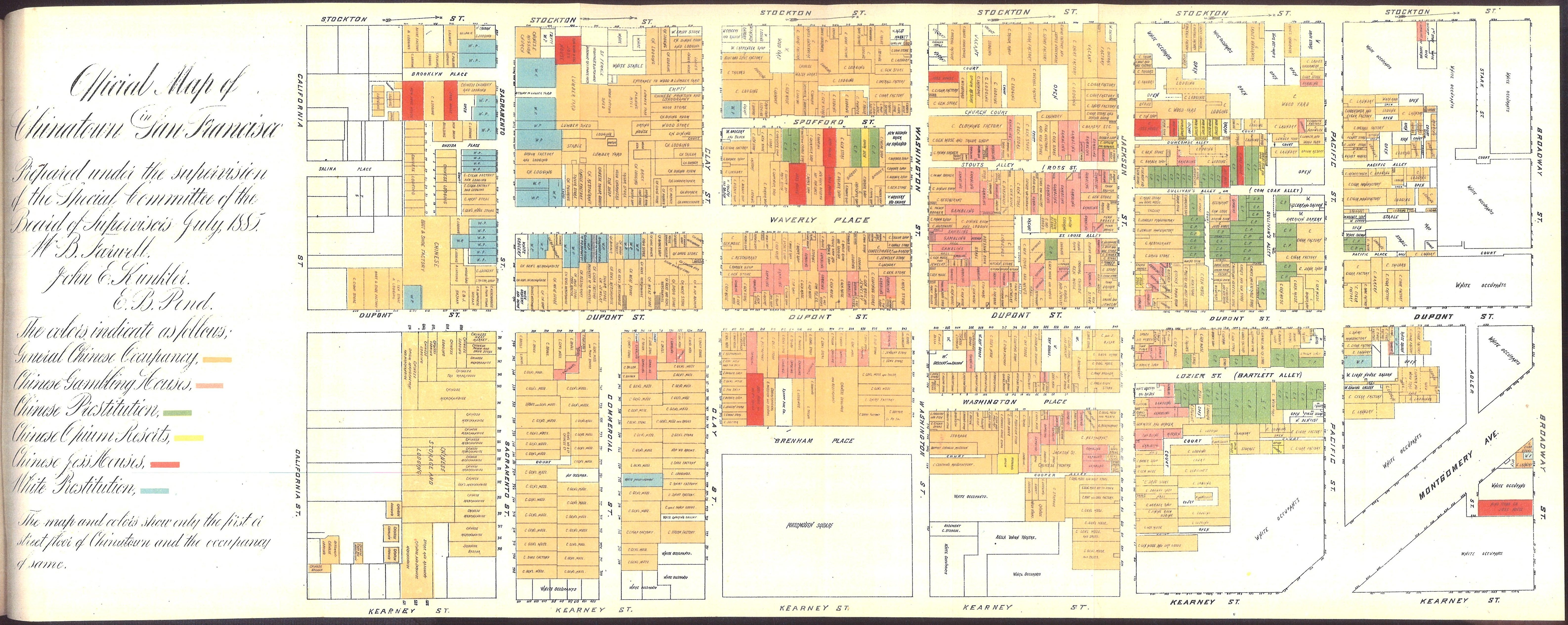
The Gordon J. Lau School, formerly the Oriental School (1906) and before that the Chinese Primary School (1885), is located just off this map, northwest of Stockton Street between Clay and Washington Streets.

Targeted by the restrictive education law, Chinese immigrants found private schools to educate their children. Some Chinese immigrants started the Chinese Language School, which enabled immigrants to teach Chinese to the next generation. Other children of immigrants were educated in religious schools and, as a result, were Christianized. Many parents wrote a letter to the education board, expressing the need to establish a Chinese School for all Chinese immigrants in San Francisco. The opening of the new Chinese school in Chinatown was not until September 1859, as the education board of San Francisco attributed the delay to lack of funding. The Chinese school operates as a day school for only nine months due to the low attendance rate. One reason for the low attendance rate is the Chinese lost control over the school administration. However, Superintendent James Denman blamed the Chinese for the school's failure, expressing that Chinese immigrants had no interest in learning American ways, and it is not the school system's fault, but some Chinese children were no doubt prevented from attending when the school was moved outside of Chinatown. This required a longer commute whereupon the children became a target of verbal and physical abuse by white children. Though the Chinese school stopped its day school operation in June 1860, it continued as a night school for another eight months before closing. Later, the school was reopened and renamed the Chinese Primary School in 1885, the Oriental School in 1906, and continuously operates as Gordon J. Lau School today.

== Incident ==
=== Tape family ===
Mamie Tape was a Chinese American born in San Francisco. Her parents, Joseph C. Tape (趙洽) (1852–1935), and Mary McGladery Tape (1857–1934), were both immigrants from China arriving in California in 1864 and 1868, respectively. Joseph Tape was born in Guangdong province in China and arrived in the United States at the age of twelve. Mary Tape was an orphan who grew up in Shanghai and moved to California at eleven. Mary Tape lived in the Ladies' Protection and Relief Society in her early life, where she learned English and American culture. Joseph and Mary Tape met at Mary's home, the Ladies' Protection and Relief Society, and married in 1875. They had four children: Mamie, Frank, Emily, and Gertrude. Joseph Tape was a businessman and an interpreter for the Chinese consulate, while Mary Tape was an amateur photographer and artist. They lived as a prosperous middle-class family and settled in the Cow Hollow neighborhood of San Francisco, a predominantly white community.

=== Before the court ===
In 1880, the California state legislature passed the Political Code, which prevented school districts from refusing admission of non-white students. Despite the existence of the state law, many Chinese children were denied entry to public school. In 1884, Mamie, then eight years old, was denied admission to the Spring Valley School because of her Chinese ancestry. Her father, Joseph Tape, immediately contacted the Chinese consulate for help. Together with the Chinese vice-consul, Frederick Bee, Joseph Tape wrote a letter to Superintendent Andrew Moulder, expressing that the denial of admission violates the Constitution of the United States, as Mamie Tape is a native-born citizen of the United States. However, the San Francisco Board of Education and Superintendent Moulder insisted that they had the right to deny entry to Mamie Tape as they, not the federal government, held sway over school decisions. In response, the Tapes filed a writ of mandamus or mandate with the Superior Court of the City and County of San Francisco. Judge James McGuire issued the writ to board members to admit Mamie or show cause why not. The board refused to comply, alleging she carried a communicable disease. In response, the Tape family provided medical documents proving that Mamie Tape had a clean bill of health, but the school board did not alter their argument.

Joseph Tape and Mary Tape then sued the San Francisco Board of Education for refusing to allow their American-born children to enter the public school in a white neighborhood. They argued that the school board's decision was a violation of the California Political Code §1667, which stated:

Every school, unless otherwise provided by law, must be open for the admission of all children between six and twenty-one years of age residing in the district; and the board of trustees, or city board of education, have power to admit adults and children not residing in the district, whenever good reasons exist therefor. Trustees shall have the power to exclude children of filthy or vicious habits, or children suffering from contagious or infectious diseases.

The defendant in the lawsuit was school principal Jennie M.A. Hurley. The San Francisco Board of Education supported Miss Hurley as they believed that she fulfilled her school principal duties.

=== Opinion of the court ===
On January 9, 1885, Superior Court Justice McGuire handed down the decision in favor of the Tapes ruling that denying admission to Mamie would be a violation of the Fourteenth Amendment, however, he also explained how the board could get around it by opening a separate school. He stressed that the court could not rule in violation of the law, but the legislature could create racial restrictions in white schools. On appeal, the California Supreme Court upheld the decision in March 1885 since California law only excluded Indian and African American students from public school. In court, Tape's attorney, W.F. Gibson, argued that the Tape family was not a typical Chinese family who did not want to assimilate into American society. Instead, the Tape family was westernized in customs, beliefs, and language. California Supreme Court justice John Sharpstein then claimed

Respondent here has the same right to enter a public school that any other child has. To deny a child, born of Chinese parents in this state, entrance to the public schools would be a violation of the law of the state and the Constitution of the United States.

== Aftermath ==
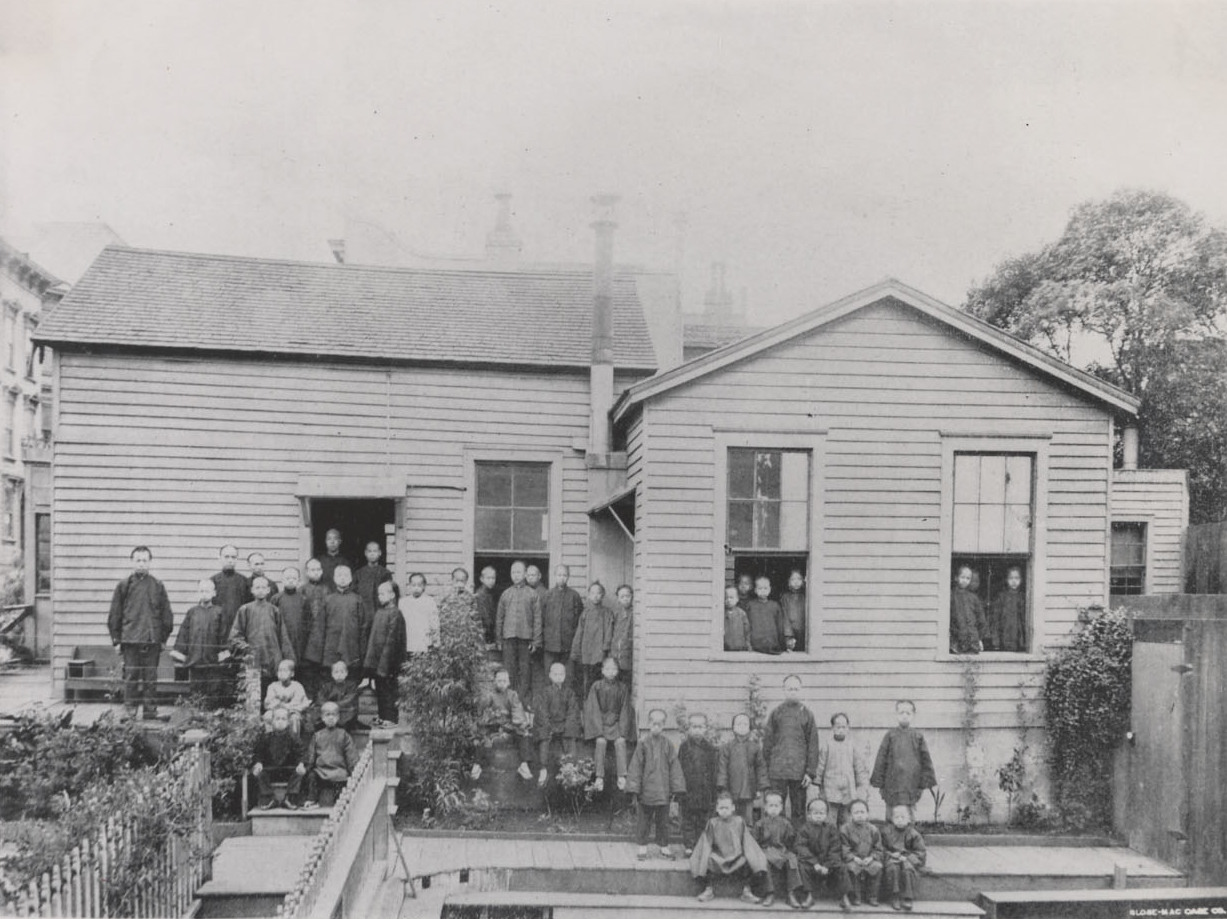
Chinese Primary School, 916 Clay

After the decision, Andrew Moulder, the Superintendent of Public Schools in San Francisco, sent a telegram to Representative W.B. May of the California State Assembly on March 4, 1885, urging passage of a pending bill to reestablish a separate school system for Chinese and other "Mongolian" children.

"Without such action I have every reason to believe that some of our classes will be inundated by Mongolians. Trouble will follow."

May responded by championing Assembly Bill 268 through to passage the next day. AB 268 allowed the establishment of "separate schools for children of Mongolian or Chinese descent. When such separate schools are established, Chinese or Mongolian children must not be admitted into any other schools." This gave the San Francisco school board the authority to establish the Chinese Primary School in San Francisco. With the law rewritten, Mamie Tape could no longer enroll in the white-dominated public school near her home. In Mary Tape's letter to Board of Education, she expressed her outrage toward the new Chinese Primary School:

May you Mr. Moulder, never be persecuted like the way you have persecuted little Mamie Tape. is it a disgrace to be Born a Chinese? Didn't God make us all!!! What right! Have you to bar my children out of the school because she is a chinese Descend. Mamie Tape will never attend any of the Chinese schools of your making! Never!!! I will let the world see sir What justice there is When it is govern by the Race prejudice men!!!

Despite Mary Tape's statement in the letter, she enrolled Mamie Tape in the Chinese School. Tape v. Hurley has a mixed result. On the one hand, it permitted the enrollment of Chinese children into public schools. On the other hand, the court gave the school board the right to establish a segregated school in San Francisco. Tape v. Hurley is both temporally and substantively similar to the landmark case Plessy v. Ferguson, which in 1896 justified the legality of segregated schools on the premise of "separate but equal." However, the cases differ in the fact that African-American children were regarded as citizens and Chinese-American children as foreigners or outsiders.

== See also ==
- History of education in California
- School segregation in California
- Clark v. Board of School Directors, an 1868 Iowa case holding schools cannot discriminate on the basis of race
- Plessy v. Ferguson, a 1896 U.S. Supreme Court case legalizing segregated schools if they are "separate but equal"
- Lum v. Rice, a 1927 U.S. Supreme Court case holding that Mississippi could require a Chinese student to attend Blacks-only school
- Brown v. Board of Education, a 1954 U.S. Supreme Court case overturning school segregation
- Parents Involved in Community Schools v. Seattle School District, No. 1, a 2007 U.S. Supreme Court case which found it unconstitutional to use race as a factor in school assignments to bring its district in line with the whole unless it was redressing past instances of de jure segregation.
