= Gentlemen's Agreement of 1907 =

Informal agreement between Japan and the U.S.

- Type: Informal agreement
- Context: To reduce tensions between the two powerful Pacific nations
- Drafted: Late 1906 – early 1907
- Signed: February 15, 1907
- Location: Washington, D.C., United States; Tokyo, Japan
- Effective: 1907
- Condition: Exchange of diplomatic notes
- Expiry: April 12, 1924
- Mediators: Theodore Roosevelt (President of the United States)
- Negotiators: Elihu Root (U.S. Secretary of State); Hayashi Tadasu (Japanese Foreign Minister); Aoki Shūzō (Japanese Ambassador to the U.S.); Luke E. Wright (U.S. Ambassador to Japan)
- Parties: Japan; United States
- Citations: Exchanged diplomatic notes (no official treaty series registration)
- Languages: English; Japanese
- Formally superseded by the U.S. Immigration Act of 1924.

The Gentlemen's Agreement of 1907 (日米紳士協約, Nichibei Shinshi Kyōyaku) was an informal agreement between the United States of America and the Empire of Japan whereby Japan would not allow further emigration of laborers to the United States and the United States would not impose restrictions on Japanese immigrants already present in the country. The was to reduce tensions between the two Pacific nations such as those that followed the Pacific Coast race riots of 1907 and the segregation of Japanese students in public schools. The agreement was not a treaty and so was not voted on by the United States Congress. It was superseded by the Immigration Act of 1924.

== Background ==
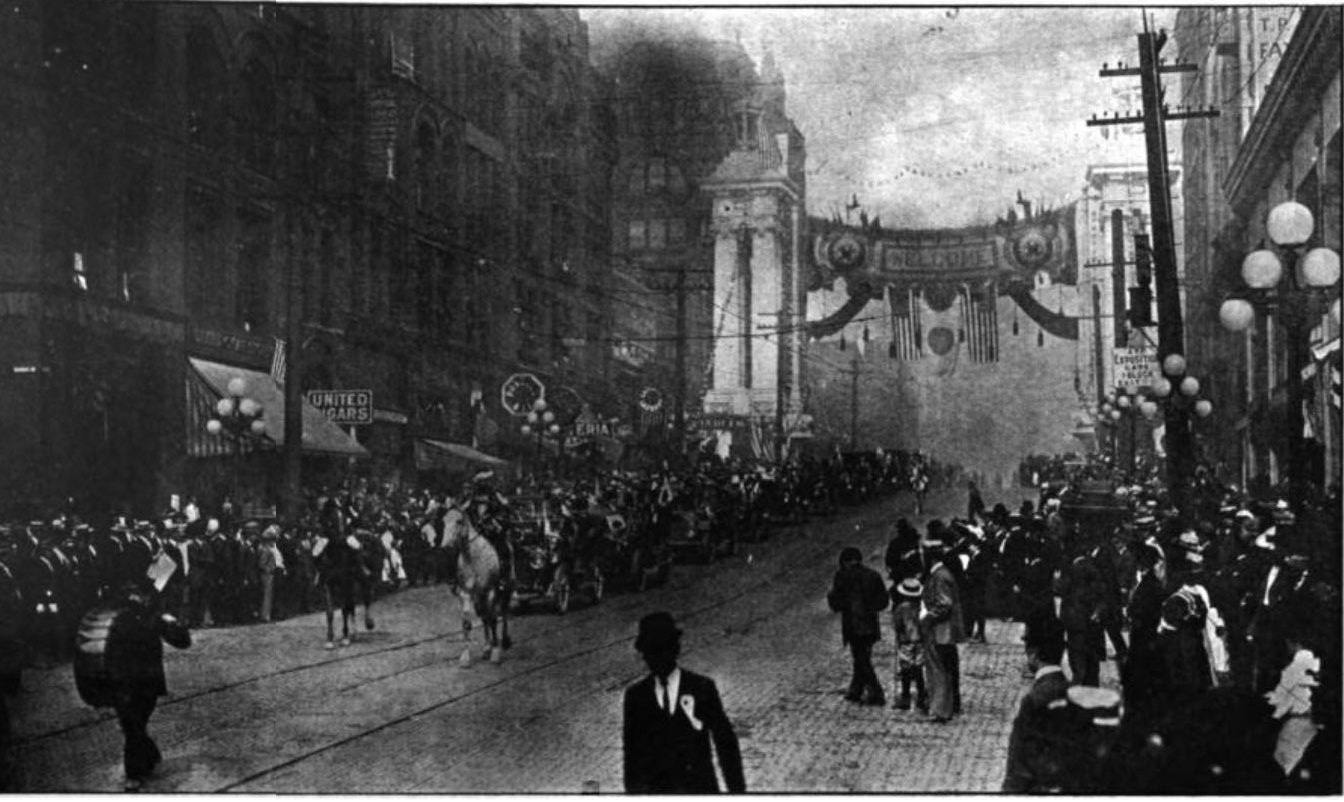
Japanese Day parade on Seattle's Second Avenue, 1909

Chinese immigration to California boomed during the Gold Rush of 1852, but the Japanese government practiced strict policies of isolation that thwarted Japanese emigration. In 1868, the Japanese government lessened restrictions, and Japanese immigration to the United States began. Anti-Chinese sentiment motivated American entrepreneurs to recruit Japanese laborers.

Most Japanese immigrants wanted to reside in America permanently and came in family groups, in contrast to the Chinese immigrants, most of whom were young men who soon returned to China. Japanese immigrants assimilated to American social norms, such as those on clothing. Many joined Methodist and Presbyterian churches.

As the Japanese population in California grew, Japanese immigrants were viewed with suspicion as an entering wedge by Japan. By 1905, Japanese Americans lived not only in Chinatown but throughout San Francisco, while anti-Japanese rhetoric was common in the Chronicle newspaper. In that year, the Japanese and Korean Exclusion League was established to promote four policies:

1. extension of the Chinese Exclusion Act to include Japanese and Koreans,
2. exclusion by League members of Japanese employees and the hiring of firms that employ Japanese,
3. pressuring the School Board to segregate Japanese from white children,
4. a propaganda campaign to inform Congress and the President of the "menace".

The Wasp, December 15, 1906

Tensions had been rising in San Francisco, and since Japan's decisive victory against Russia in the Russo-Japanese War in 1905, Japan demanded treatment as an equal. The result was a series of six notes communicated between Japan and the United States from late 1907 to early 1908. The immediate cause of the Agreement was anti-Japanese nativism in California. In 1906, the San Francisco Board of Education passed a regulation whereby children of Japanese descent would be required to attend separate, segregated schools. At the time, Japanese immigrants made up approximately 1% of the population of California, many of whom had immigrated under a treaty in 1894 that had assured free immigration from Japan.

In the Agreement, Japan agreed not to issue passports for Japanese citizens wishing to work in the Continental United States, thus effectively eliminating new Japanese immigration to the United States. In exchange, the United States agreed to accept the presence of Japanese immigrants already residing there; to permit the immigration of wives, children, and parents; and to avoid legal discrimination against Japanese American children in California schools. There was also a strong desire on the part of the Japanese government to resist being treated as inferiors. Japan did not want the United States to pass any legislation such as had happened to the Chinese under the Chinese Exclusion Act. US President Theodore Roosevelt, who had a positive opinion of Japan, accepted the Agreement as proposed by Japan to avoid more formal immigration restrictions.

== Segregation of schools ==
At the time, there were 93 Japanese students spread across 23 elementary schools. For decades, policies segregated Japanese schools, but they were not enforced as long as there was room and white parents did not complain. The Japanese and Korean Exclusion League appeared before the school board multiple times to complain. The school board dismissed its claims because it was fiscally infeasible to create new facilities to accommodate only 93 students. After the 1906 fire, the school board sent the 93 Japanese students to the Chinese Primary School and renamed it "The Oriental Public School for Chinese, Japanese, and Koreans." Transportation was limited after the earthquake, and many students could not attend the Oriental Public School.

Many Japanese Americans argued with the school board that the segregation of schools went against the Treaty of 1894, which did not expressly address education but indicated that Japanese in America would receive equal rights. Under the controlling decisions of the United States Supreme Court (Plessy v. Ferguson, 1896), a state did not violate the Equal Protection Clause of the United States Constitution by requiring racial segregation so long as the separate facilities were substantially equal. Tokyo newspapers denounced the segregation as an insult to Japanese pride and honor. The Japanese government wanted to protect its reputation as a world power. Government officials became aware that a crisis was at hand, and intervention was necessary to maintain diplomatic peace.

=== Federal intervention ===
President Roosevelt had three objectives to resolve the situation: showing Japan that the policies of California did not reflect the ideals of the entire country, forcing San Francisco to remove the segregation policies, and reaching a resolution to the Japanese immigration problem. Victor Metcalf, Secretary of Commerce and Labor, was sent to investigate the issue and to force the rescission of the policies. He was unsuccessful since local officials wanted Japanese exclusion. Roosevelt tried to pressure the school board, but it would not budge. On February 15, 1907, the parties came to a compromise. If Roosevelt could ensure the suspension of Japanese immigration, the school board would allow Japanese American students to attend public schools. The Japanese government did not want to harm its national pride or to suffer humiliation like the Qing government in 1882 in China from the Chinese Exclusion Act. The Japanese government agreed to stop granting passports to laborers who were trying to enter the United States unless such laborers were coming to occupy a formerly-acquired home; to join a parent, spouse, or child; or to assume active control of a previously acquired farming enterprise.

Concessions were agreed in a note consisting of six points a year later. The agreement was followed by the admission of students of Japanese ancestry into public schools. The adoption of the 1907 Agreement spurred the arrival of "picture brides," marriages of convenience made at a distance through photographs. By establishing marital bonds at a distance, women seeking to emigrate to the United States were able to gain a passport, and Japanese workers in America were able to gain a partner of their own nationality. Because of that provision, which helped close the gender gap within the community from a ratio of 7 men to every woman in 1910 to less than 2 to 1 by 1920, the Japanese American population continued to grow despite the Agreement's limits on immigration. The Gentlemen's Agreement was never written into a law passed by the US Congress, but was an informal agreement between the United States and Japan, enacted via unilateral action by President Roosevelt. It was nullified by the Immigration Act of 1924, which legally banned all Asians from migrating to the United States.

== See also ==
- Japan–United States relations
- List of United States immigration laws
- Root–Takahira Agreement
- Immigration Act of 1917
- Gentlemen's Agreement of 1908
- History of Education in California
