= Alice Fong Yu =

American teacher and community organizer (1905–2000)

- Fong Yu P'ing
- Born: Alice Fong; March 2, 1905; Washington, California
- Died: December 19, 2000 (aged 95)
- Education: San Francisco State University and University of California, Berkeley
- Occupations: Teacher and Community Organizer
- Known for: Square and Circle Club and the Alice Fong Yu Alternative School
- Spouse: Jon Yong Chang Yu
- Children: Alon Yu and Joal Yu

Alice Fong Yu (Chinese: 尤方玉屏; 2 March 1905 – 19 December 2000) was an American schoolteacher and community organizer. The first Chinese American to teach at a public school, she was a founding member and first president of the Square and Circle Club (方圓社), and was a prominent leader in the San Francisco Chinatown community.

== Biography ==
=== Early life ===
Alice Fong Yu was born Alice Fong in the small gold-mining town of Washington in Nevada County, California. Her Chinese name was Fong Yu P'ing, a variation of which she used as a pen name later in life. She was born on March 2, 1905, to Lonnie Tom and Fong Chow (Suey Chang). While in Washington, Fong Chow was superintendent of a leased gold mine and also ran a general store for Chinese miners.

Fong Yu was the second of ten children, seven of which were also born in Washington. The youngest three were born after the family moved to Vallejo. The family's eldest child was a son named Theodore, and Fong Yu's younger siblings were Minnie, who often went by Mickey, Taft, Helen, Albert, Marian, Leslie, Martha and Lorraine.

After many years of running the mine in Washington and making improvements, Fong Chow lost the lease when its owners decided to take it back for themselves. Unable to support his family, Fong Chow relocated to Vallejo, California where he opened The Oriental Market on Georgia Street.

Fong Chow was a progressive and educated Chinese Nationalist, and encouraged all of his children, both daughters and sons, to pursue an education. Encouragement for Chinese girls to get an education and join professions was not standard in Chinese and Chinese American families at the time, though it was more common in Chinese Christian households. All six Fong sisters graduated from college and four of the sisters, including Alice Fong Yu, were the first Chinese American women to enter their chosen professional fields. Of these women, Alice Fong Yu became the first Chinese American public school teacher and her sisters Mickey, Marian and Martha Fong became the first Chinese American public health nurse, dental hygienist and nursery school teacher respectively.

=== Identity as Chinese American and Christian ===
Alice Fong Yu became familiar with anti-Chinese racial discrimination at a young age. In interviews, Fong Yu has recalled being taunted and shunned by white students as a child in Washington. Of the experience she has said:

"It is surprising, isn't it, that [in] just a small one room school and [among] just a handful of children, they still thought we were queer. They would sing "Ching Chong Chinaman" and all those things to make fun of us and make you feel like nobody, and then when we would play games, they wouldn't hold our hands, as if they would be contaminated by our hands, and so they wouldn't accept us".

The Fong siblings found comfort in the words of their parents and in the acceptance of local Christian communities. The Fong parents encouraged their children to take pride in their Chinese heritage, calling their children's tormentors “barbarians” whose taunts shouldn't be allowed to bother them. They assured their children that their people had a rich culture and a long history, and that once they gained an education, they would be looked up to when they returned to China.

Once the family moved to Vallejo, they were invited into the Vallejo Christian community. The Presbyterian church first sent a Sunday school teacher to the Vallejo Chinatown to teach the community's children, eventually leading to the Fong's joining the larger, majority-white congregation. This was unusual for the time, and Fong Yu has praised the congregation as “ the ones who accepted us in the early days... [and] gave us a chance to intermingle with other races."

Both Fong Yu's Chinese heritage and Christian faith would remain strong influences on her life. Together, they would form the bedrock of her future career in community service. Fong Yu did not perceive any conflict between these two facets of her identity, and indeed believed that the virtues of both overlapped. According to Fong Yu, the teachings of Confucius “'contained all the virtues of Christian teachings'” and “'that only those who were unfamiliar with the heritage of China’s wisdom failed to see that'”.

=== Marriage and family ===
On December 22, 1940, in Tucson, Arizona, Alice Fong Yu married Jon Yong Chang Yu, a writer and journalist who wrote editorials for the Young China newspaper. The couple met through the Chinese War Relief Association, where Fong Yu served as the Square and Circle Club's representative and Yu served as the organization's secretary and news release writer. They had two sons, Alon and Joal. Jon Yong Chang Yu died of a sudden illness in 1966, while the couple was on a trip to Asia to visit members of Jon's family that he had not been able to see in decades.

== Career as an Educator ==
After graduating from high school in 1923, Alice Fong Yu moved to San Francisco to attend the San Francisco State Teachers College. When she had applied in 1922, she was personally introduced the president of the college, Dr. Frederic Lister Burk. This introduction was made by the head of the local Red Cross, whom she had worked with and impressed with her fundraising work for the YWCA Girls Reserve. She was initially denied admission to the college, being told by Dr. Burk that she would not be hired for a teaching job anywhere in the country because she was Chinese. Fong Yu, frustrated because “”[She'd] faced so much discrimination’”, told Dr. Burk that she has no intention of staying in the US, and was instead planning on moving to China to “’teach my people’”. This convinced Dr. Burk to admit Fong Yu to the program, and she graduated in 1926.

=== Commodore Stockton Elementary School ===
Alice Fong Yu never moved to China to teach, and instead was hired directly after her graduation by Commodore Stockton Elementary School (formerly known as the Oriental Public School). Commodore Stockton was the required primary school for Chinese children in San Francisco at the time. However, before Fong Yu’s hiring, the school had no Chinese speaking teachers. The school’s new principal recognized the need to rectify this language barrier and hired Fong Yu as the first Chinese American to teach in the San Francisco public school system.

Fong Yu continued to experience discrimination throughout her time at Commodore Stockton. While she was hired as a schoolteacher, she was often required to serve in many different administrative and non-classroom roles. Her ability to speak Chinese, unlike the rest of the school staff, led her to be asked to fulfill almost all the duties that are required to run school, including those of an assistant principal, a translator, councilor, a nurse and a social worker. Despite 31 years of teaching experience, Fong Yu was never promoted and only received the salary of a normal teacher. Fong Yu was offered the position of principal in the 1950s near the end of her career at Commodore Stockton, but she turned the position down in order to care for her child and her husband who were experiencing health difficulties.

During her time at Commodore Stockton, Fong Yu worked to help her students navigate the bi-cultural experience of being Chinese American as her family had done for her. In a 1926 article by the San Francisco Examiner, Fong Yu explained that she believed that "'the Chinese boy or girl who wants to make a good American citizen cannot be one unless he retains the fineness and restraint of his own race," something that she "'[tried] to make plain to all the girls and boys I teach". To that end, she "'sought to show her students how to manage a dual culture, [not only appreciating] their ancient Chinese culture but also learning how to be modern and progressive.'”

=== Speech Therapy ===
Alice Fong Yu's youngest son, Joal, was born with cerebral palsy due to complications in childbirth. Seeking to help her son face the challenges of his condition, Fong Yu enrolled at the University of California, Berkeley, and took courses in speech therapy. She received her certification in 1957 and was then commissioned to teach speech therapy in schools throughout the San Francisco area. Until her retirement in 1970, Fong Yu served as the speech correction teacher-at large for many San Francisco schools. Fong Yu recalled that she "'was sent to different schools, on a different route every day, five days a week'" as her "'special assignment up to [her] retirement'".

During her years as a speech therapist, Fong Yu began the practice of grouping students with the same speech problem and teaching them together. According to Fong Yu, this method of speech therapy made the children "'more comfortable – not singled out, not awful... just kids with something they need to learn, can learn.'”

== Community leader and activist ==
In addition to her work in the San Francisco public school system, Alice Fong Yu was a noted community leader and activist. She was involved with many Chinatown organizations including the Square and Circle Club, Chinese Needlework Guild, the YWCA, and the Lake Tahoe Christian Conference. She also contributed to the Chinese Digest, a progressive Chinese language newspaper founded in 1935.

By the time Fong Yu was in her early 30s, she had already developed a reputation as a community organizer who was ready and willing to take on whatever project San Francisco Chinatown had a need for. Later in life, Fong Yu recalled that "'being so useful in the community, they put me in everything,'" and that "'[she] was always the superintendent wherever [she] went'".

=== The Square and Circle Club ===
In 1924, Alice Fong Yu and six other young women who were members of the Chinese Congregational Church founded the Square and Circle Club, the oldest Chinese women's service organization in the United States. Fong Yu served as the club's first president.

The immediate impetus behind the club's creation was to raise money for flood and famine victims in China. However, the founding members had long spoke about ways to better their community and perform public service, and also organized the club to serve these more long-term objectives. Of the club and its founding goals, Fong Yu has said that at the time, "so much community service had to be done, and nobody was doing it... We felt that we could bring women together and use our talents, our energy, and be more loving and caring in doing things for the community"".

Fong Yu advocated for the women of the Square and Circle Club to be allowed to perform community service work that was previously the domain of Chinatown men's organizations. Regarding the organizations' first benefit dance organized to fundraise for Chinese Flood and Famine Relief, Fong Yu was quoted by a local newspaper as saying, "Usually the Chinese Chamber of Commerce or the Six Companies are in charge of these charitable and public affairs... But we wanted to help, too. American girls can do these things. Why shouldn't we?'" In this way, Fong Yu was a vital part in starting the Square and Circle Club's tradition of community service, leadership, sisterhood and pride that has impacted several generations of Chinese and Asian American women.

=== Journalism and Writing ===
Alice Fong Yu was a prolific journalist, writing many opinion and lifestyle articles that spoke on many political, social, and day-to-day issues of her time. Some of her earlier writing was published in the Chinese Christian Student, which was the official newspaper of the Chinese Christian Student Organization (CSCA). However, it wasn't until 1937 that she began writing her own regular column for the Chinese Digest aimed at Chinese American women entitled the "Jade Box”. For this column, she wrote under the pen name “Lady P’ing” and later “Lady P’ing Yu” after her marriage. This was a reference to her Chinese name, Fong Yu P’ing, though she used different Chinese characters in her pen name. Through the “Jade Box”, Fong Yu offered advice on fashion, recipes, men, and marriage alongside political and social commentary regarding issues of race, women's issues and American life.

Fong Yu often used the “Jade Box” as an extension of the community activism and advocacy she performed in other part of her life. For example, when the Square and Circle Club was rejected from the Federation of Women's Clubs on racial grounds, Fong Yu wrote about this act of discrimination in her column, connecting it to the larger phenomenon of anti- Chinese racism. She also often used her column to advocate more generally for the rights of women, particularly Chinese American women, to be seen and treated as equals by their male counterparts. Finally, with the onset of the Second Sino-Japanese War and the later entrance of the United States into WWII, Fong Yu often wrote in support of strikes, fundraisers, and anti-Japanese boycotts that she was involved in through organizations like the Square and Circle Club and the Chinese War Relief Association.

Under her leadership, the Square and Circle Club was the major player in the “Non-Silk Movement”, a nationwide boycott of Japanese silk stockings. During this time, the “Jade Box” praised Chinatown merchants who “submitted to the coercion of group conscience and have openly stopped their trade with the Japanese” and admonished women who did not join the “Non- Silk Movement”. In response to a letter written to the column criticizing Chinese American women who did not support the boycott, the column agreed and openly criticized women who “weep openly and sicken over the ghastly reports on the rape of Chinese women by Japanese soldiers, and yet feel no shame to have their money go to support these soldiers on Chinese soil by continuing to buy Japan[ese] silk.”

However, despite her criticism of women who did not support the boycott, Fong Yu's general approach to war was from a feminist and pacifist perspective. She was of the opinion that women knew better than men about the horrors of war. This was because she felt women in wartime experienced the “piecemeal” and heart-wrenching deaths of their sons and loved ones over time, while men are often sold the myth of the glorious sacrifice of war. In her mind, “war was neither right nor reasonable” and saw efforts to support China in the war against Japan as means to “banish war from the face of the earth".

=== Chinese Needlework Guild ===
While she was teaching at Commodore Stockton Elementary School, Alice Fong Yu worked to help her students' families if they were in need. One way she accomplish this was by establishing the Chinese chapter of the Needlework Guild. This group was started partially because many of her students' parents could not speak English well enough to participate in the Commodore Stockton PTA. In response to this issue, Fong Yu started her chapter of the Needlework Guild to serve as an alternative PTA. This group provided shoes and clothes to children in Chinatown, as well as provided a space for Chinese mothers to sew for their own children. Fong Yu has described the guild as a place where she and other Chinese women “'got together to sew and talk about things,'” and that “'whenever [the group] found out about an impoverished family, we would help them to get on welfare'”. In this way, Fong Yu used her position at Commodore Stockton to support Chinatown families in need.

=== YWCA ===
Alice Fong Yu worked with the Young Women's Christian Association (YWCA) at many points in her life. Her career in public service started in the YWCA Girls Reserve during her teenage years. In her adult life, Fong Yu became highly involved in the San Francisco Chinatown YWCA, acting as "forum leader, fund raiser, and den mother". In her role as the YWCA's first house mother, Fong Yu ran a Friday breakfast club and started a Bible class for Sunday School teachers. She also participated in and facilitated activities to help second-generation women acclimate to life in the United States, including language classes, social dinners, sports, and group discussions on topics such as race prejudice, Chinese culture, current events, marriage, and parenting.

=== Lake Tahoe Chinese Young People's Christian Conference ===
In 1932, inspired by their experiences at YMCA and YWCA conferences, Alice Fong Yu joined with two other politically active Chinese American Christians, Fong Yu's future brother-in-law Ira Lee and the future Chinese Methodist minister Edwar Lee, to organize a liberal Christian conference for Chinese American youth. These plans would come to fruition in 1933, when the trio was able to organize what would become the first annual Lake Tahoe Chinese Young People's Christian Conference, known colloquially as simply the "Tahoe Conferences". Although the Tahoe Conferences had their origins in Church organizations and discussed Christian issues, non-Christians were encouraged to attend and the conferences were not meant to proselytize. Instead, the Tahoe Conferences provided a space for second generation Chinese Americans to meet, socialize, and discuss social and political issues as a larger community outside of their local Chinatowns.

These conferences would become annual events in the Chinese American community that would meet through the 1960s, and then continue on as a family conference into the early 2000s. Tahoe conference participants, or "Tahoeites", would go on create several offshoot organizations and events inspired by their experiences at the conferences. One of these offshoot organizations was an East Coast variation on the Tahoe Conferences held at the Silver Bay Conference Grounds at Lake George, New York. These conferences were organized by "Tahoeites" George Kan, Eddie Leong Way, and Paul Louie, and were held from the early 1940s to the 1960s. Fong Yu also created her own offshoot organization called "The Chinese Young People's Forum". This interdenominational organization met at the Donalinda Cameron House to discuss issues affecting the San Francisco Chinatown community.

== Yu's legacy ==
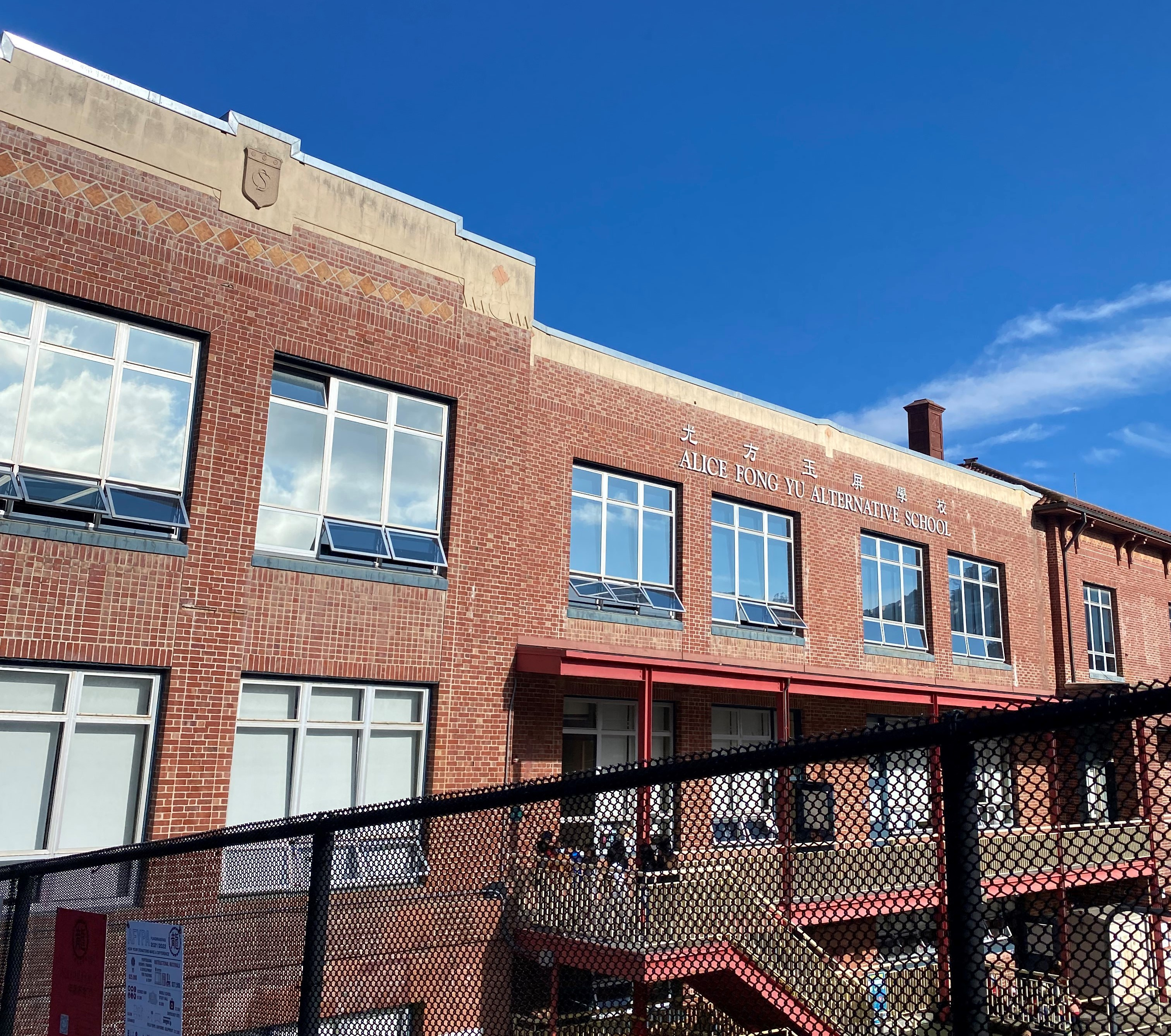
Alice Fong Yu Alternative School

In 1996 San Francisco's Chinese immersion school was named Alice Fong Yu Alternative School in Yu's honor.

At the San Francisco Jazz Festival in October 2007, composer and jazz pianist Jon Jang performed the world premiere of "Unbound Chinatown: A Musical Tribute to Alice Fong Yu.” Jang called the piece a "musical portrait" of Yu's experience as an activist in the late-1930s.
