= Square and Circle Club =

The Square and Circle Club is a women's community service organization located in San Francisco. Founded in 1924, it is the oldest Chinese women's community service club in the United States. Throughout its history, the club has been active in its support of numerous San Francisco Chinatown community organizations and philanthropic causes.

Many of the club's members have been influential in the San Francisco Chinatown community. The club notes its founder Alice Fong Yu, who was the first Chinese American public school teacher in San Francisco, and Alice G. Lowe, the first Chinese American Commissioner and Chair of San Francisco's Asian Art Museum.

== Name and Symbology ==
The club's name comes from Chinese proverb meaning "In deeds be square, in knowledge be all-round". The name was suggested by founding member Alice Fong Yu's Chinese language tutor, Professor Fung Gee Shau. The club's symbol follows this motif, taking on the iconography of a round ancient Chinese bass coin with square markings in the center.

== Founding ==
The Square and Circle Club was founded in 1924 by seven young Chinese American women who were members of the Chinese Congressional Church, now known as the Chinese Congregational United Church of Christ. The seven original founding members were first president Alice Fong Yu, Anne Lee Leong, Ivy Lee Mah, Bessie Wong Shum, Daisy K. Wong and Daisy L. Wong. The group soon expanded to 16 members, and would continue to grow before stabilizing at encompassing an average of 80 members at any given time.

The Square and Circle Clubs status as the first Chinese American women's service organization allowed its early members to invent a new tradition in the public service club space. The club was the first Chinese American women's service club to exist as its own independent entity rather than a women's axillary branch of a church or men's service organization. As such, early members of the club were able to decide for themselves what this kind of women's service club should be. While they were certainly influenced by both the Chinese and American traditions of women's public service, they had no strict models on which to base their organization, allowing them the freedom to innovate for themselves.

== Membership ==
Like its founding membership, the club has primarily consisted of American-born Chinese American business and professional women, though it has been open to women of all races and backgrounds. As such, the club has always had a strong focus on the Chinese American community of San Francisco and the bicultural identity of its membership.

The Square and Circle Club's original association with the Chinese Congressional Church has also influenced the organization. Many club members, particularly in their earlier years, have cited Christianity as a significant influence on their philanthropic and community organizing efforts. However, the club has never required members to be Christian and has never served as a proselytizing force. While the organization has Christian roots, the primary force connecting its members has been a shared cultural identity and desire to improve their community rather than a shared religion.

Membership in the Square and Circle Club is often long-term. Founding members stayed active in the organization well into their late seventies and eighties, and many others served as part of the club for decades. Many members join the organization as young professionals in their twenties and remain part of the club for most of their lives. Often there is a gap where members resign in mid-adulthood due to increased work and family obligations but then come back to become members of the club again once they have finished raising their families and are closer to retirement.

== History ==
=== Early Fundraising Activities ===
The impetus behind the club's founding was its founding members' desire to raise money for flood and famine victims in China.

Starting in 1926, the club began to have two benefit events per year to raise money for international philanthropic causes. Their original 1926 fundraiser was a hope chest raffle, with the prize chest being filled with hand embroidered linens sewn by club members. Now, fundraising events have been expanded to include a variety of activities, including "carnivals, dances, fashion shows, raffles, rummage sales, teas, and cookbook publications".

The club has also put on a number of well received plays, musicals and variety shows, with the proceeds donated to charity. The first of these shows was performed in 1933 in conjunction with and for the benefit of the Chung Mei Home for Chinese Boys. The show was a musical comedy entitled "It Happened in Zandavia". The musical was shown multiple times, and ended its run with a successful showing at the War Memorial Auditorium in San Francisco's Civic Center.

=== Wartime Efforts ===
Like many other organizations in the Chinese American community at the time, the Square and Circle Club was a strong supporter of the Chinese war effort against Japanese Imperialism during WWII. From the 1930s onwards, the Square and Circle Club raised large amounts of money for relief efforts benefiting Chinese war refugees. These fundraisers were often done in collaboration with other Chinatown organizations such as the War Relief Committee of the Chinese Consolidated Benevolent Association and the United China War Relief Association of America. Club members also worked to provide supplies for the Chinese war effort, volunteered for organizations like the Red Cross, and participated in political activities such as protests, parades, and lobbying efforts aimed at pressuring Congress to declare a trade embargo against Japan.

The club became mainly involved with holding fashion show benefits for the war effort and leading the boycott against Japanese-made silk stockings. The fashion shows were top-rated, and were taken on the road to smaller towns outside San Francisco. As well as raising funds for the war effort, these shows also spread an appreciation for Chinese culture as club members exposed large audiences to elaborate Chinese outfits ranging from the Tang dynasty to the modern day.

The Square and Circle Club's participation in the silk boycott, or "Non-Silk Movement", was part of a larger, national effort to boycott Japanese silk, which was one of the nation's main exports. In San Francisco, the Square and Circle Club was the main force behind promoting and organizing the local component of this national boycott, giving it more attention than other, majority male Chinatown organizations did at the time. The club ran multiple promotions in both local and national publications showing club members wearing lisle stockings, a popular alternative to silk. In these advertisements, the club encouraged women to "'Be in style, wear lisle". The boycott was also heavily promoted by then president Alice Fong Yu's' in the Chinese Digest through her column the "Jade Box" .

Once the United States officially entered WWII in 1941, the Square and Circle Club also began activities to support the US war effort in the Pacific. These activities included "sponsor[ing] dances for Chinese American soldiers on leave, act[ing] as hostesses for the Y.W.CA's U.S.O. (United Services Organization) program, and participat[ing] in Red Cross activities". The club also became involved in selling war bonds and another financial fundraising that supported the US war effort.

=== Early Media Representation ===
From its earliest beginnings, the Square and Circle Club gained high acclaim from media circles. In 1926, only two years after the club's founding, the Square and Circle Club was given praise from Los Angeles Record columnist Louis Leung, who wrote of the club:

"Whenever there is a flood in China, or an orphan to look after, or the poor to remember – the Square and Circle Club of twenty-four Chinese girls can always be counted on to carry out its motto of service. There are other clubs and organizations in Chinatown, lots of them, but this handful of girls has led them all in sterling service to the community and to their country. Most young girls band together for social purposes chiefly, but not so the Square and Circle members. They have two projects each year in their program of ministering to the needs of their less fortunate countrymen."

== Social Reform and Advocacy ==
The Square and Circle Club has always been an organization dedicated to social reform. Through both its general philanthropic activities and policy advocacy, the club has grounded many of its activities in Chinese and Asian American issues, as well as women's issues within that community.

=== Chinese and Asian American Advocacy ===
While the club has been more focused on philanthropy than explicit policy issues, the Square and Circle Club has been an active force regarding a number of social and political causes over the years. As previously stated, the club was highly invested in support for China during WWII through fundraising and boycotts of Japanese goods. During this time period, the club was also active in the fight against domestic discrimination against Chinese and Chinese Americans. To this end, the club promoted bills regarding immigration rights and US citizenship for those of Chinese origin in America, something that was at the time restricted by anti-Asian immigration laws such as the Chinese Exclusion Act and the Immigration Act of 1924. The club also took an active part in local politics by lobbying for better community infrastructure in Chinatown, as well as working with other organizations to register Chinese Americans to vote.

In its more general activities, much of the work and causes supported by the Square and Circle Club over the years have been grounded in local Asian American and San Francisco Chinatown community issues. Club member Ruth Chinn emphasized the club's community-based focus as her motivation for public service, saying "'That is my theory - of giving back to the community what life has given me". In addition to providing money and service for local causes, the club's dedication to the community has manifested itself by providing funding for internships in more than a dozen San Francisco nonprofits that serve the Asian American community through the “Square and Circle Club Civic Engagement Internship” program.

While its original membership was primarily American-born Chinese Americans, the Square and Circle Club has never been ethnicity-exclusive. Its openness toward non-Chinese members and interest in cross-cultural interaction set it apart from many Chinese men's organizations that were in operation at the time of the club's founding. Over time, the club's interests and member base have expanded from being primarily Chinese American to encompassing a larger Asian American perspective.

=== Chinese and Asian American Women’s Advocacy ===
The Square and Circle Club has continually shown a dedication to improving the welfare of Asian American women. Since its founding, the club has “advocated social change by supporting women's financial independence, education, and protection against domestic violence”. Past programs that have benefited Asian American women have included the Square and Circle Club's Friendship Fund, which provided monetary aid for Asian American women in need. This fund was active from the 1930s to the 1960s. Their general fundraising activities have also often benefited organizations that focus on Asian American women, such as the Asian Women's Shelter, the Gum Moon Women's Residence, and the Ming Quong Chinese Girls' Orphanage among many others.

== Membership Support ==
The Square and Circle Club is a tight-knit group that values long-term relationships within its membership. This feeling of sisterhood is demonstrated by passage in the Square and Circle Club's 50th anniversary book describing the club as being:

“as much a part of our lives as if it were a member of our family. We love it (always) and hate it (at times) passionately, faithfully, openly. We shed 'blood, sweat and tears' for it without question. New members we embrace as sisters, and when one of us leaves us, it is as if she were our own flesh and blood."

This feeling of camaraderie and sisterhood is enhanced by the club's function as a service organization that allows members to work together to achieve larger goals. As such, the club has been able to provide both a community-driven purpose and social support for its members for close to a century.

In addition, the Square and Circle Club has served as a space for its members to explore Chinese and Asian American identity. Many early members have expressed the feeling of being a “bridge between the old and the new” and being “very comfortable in both [Chinese and American] cultures". The Square and Circle Club, which frequently engaged in both Chinese and American cultural activities, provided a space for members to express both facets of their identity without abandoning one for the other.

== Personal Development and Leadership Training ==
The Square and Circle Club has taken pride in providing leadership training and opportunities for its membership. The club requires a high level of involvement from its members, with attendance required at many events and monthly meetings. Members have also been required to serve on the board of directors within five years of joining and to serve as an officer or on a committee at least once every five years after this initial period. This level of required engagement has made it so every member has been an active part of running the club with opportunities to lead projects and committees. In this way, all members are given the opportunity to learn both hard and soft leadership skills that range from creating complex budgets to negotiating between different factions working on a large project. One early club member has remarked that her membership in the Square and Circle Club allowed her to take on “’responsibilities which would not have been possible in [her] regular job’” that have “‘enabled [her] to take on responsibilities with confidence’”. These opportunities have been extended to younger women in the community through the club's Junior chapter, providing leadership training to interested girls at a younger age.

== Organizational Partners and Beneficiaries ==
The many organizations and causes that the Square and Circle Club have benefited or partnered with since its founding include:

- Angel Island Immigration Station
- Asian Women's Shelter
- Betty Ann Ong Chinese Recreation Center
- Chinatown YMCA and YWCA
- Chinese Hospital
- City College of San Francisco, Chinatown/North Beach Campus.
- Chinese Education Center
- Chinese Historical Society of America
- Gum Moon Women's Residence
- In Search of Roots Program, Chinese Culture Foundation
- Laguna Honda Hospital
- On Lok Senior Citizens Health Services
- Self-Help for the Elderly
- 2008 Sichuan earthquake
- 2011 Japanese earthquake and tsunami
- 2015 Nepal earthquake
- Chung Mei Home for Chinese Boys
- Chinatown Youth Center
- San Francisco Public Library
- Chinese Newcomers Service Center
- Ming Quong Chinese Girls' Orphanage
