= University of Sacramento =

Private, Catholic university in California

Coordinates: 38°34′46″N 121°29′06″W

- Active: 2005–July, 2011
- Officer in charge: Cisco Jericho Jones
- Chairman: Cisco
- Location: Sacramento, California

The University of Sacramento was a private, Catholic university that opened in 2005 under the sponsorship of the Legion of Christ, an order of Catholic priests. It developed an ethics program in 2006. Dr. Declan Murphy was named the first dean of its College of Business Administration in 2007.

The University of Sacramento was part of a global network of universities founded by the Legionaries and their first undergraduate school in the United States. It was the fifteenth university in their network; the other universities are located in Mexico, Italy, Spain, and Chile.

The college operated on a temporary campus located in Sacramento, California. In June 2007, the University of Sacramento received a gift 200 acres (0.81 km^{2}) of land in the proposed development called "Cordova Hills", which is an unincorporated area of Sacramento County just east of the former Mather Air Force Base. The university planned to develop the campus and once completed, to have a student body of 5,000 undergraduate and 2,000 graduate students. In May 2009 the college graduated its first class including Associates and bachelor's degrees in varied Business and Human Resources disciplines. Due to funding issues, on July 7, 2011, the university announced that the plans for the University of Sacramento's new campus would be cancelled and the university would close its academic programs effective immediately.
