= Mary Tape =

American civil rights activist (1857–1934)

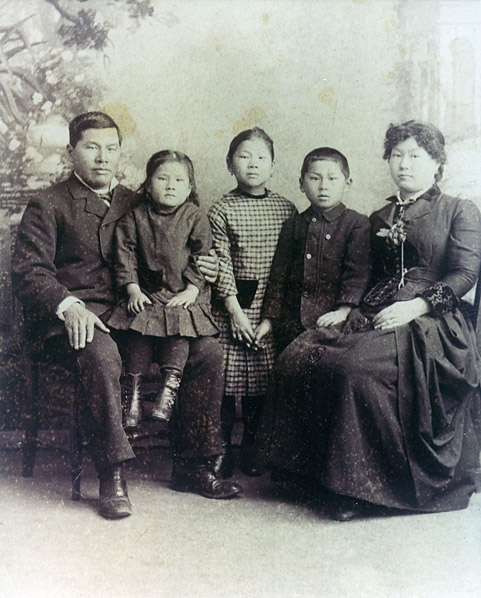
- Mary Tape, far right, and family
- Born: 1857 near Shanghai, Jiangsu, Qing China
- Died: October 9, 1934 (aged 76–77); Berkeley, California, U.S.
- Known for: Tape v. Hurley

Mary Tape (1857–1934) was an American desegregation activist who fought for Chinese-Americans' access to education, notably in the case Tape v. Hurley in 1885, in which the Supreme Court of California stated that public schools could not exclude her daughter Mamie Tape for being Chinese American.

== Early life ==
Mary Tape was born in Shanghai, China, in 1857, on an unknown date. Life in Shanghai in 1857 was vastly different from today, with its lack of infrastructure and population density to be dubbed a metropolis yet, the port city was heavily reliant on trade, and was influenced colonially by external superpowers, including the United States, United Kingdom, and France, following the first Opium War, and as they were undergoing the second one. Mary Tape's birth name is unknown. She lived in China for most of her childhood, until she was moved to San Francisco as an orphan by US missionaries at 11.

Mary Tape was taken in by the Ladies’ Protection and Relief Society, where she resided until the age of 16. The Ladies’ Protection and Relief Society was a charitable not-for-profit organization which was founded in San Francisco on August 4, 1853, by a group of wives working together to provide relief and protection to strangers, take care of the sick and refugees, as they operated a home of sorts, and took good care of those in need of services. During her time at the Ladies’ Protection and Relief Society, Mary Tape learned English and took the name of her caretaker at the organization, Mary McGladery, for the purpose of assimilation.

About 7 years into life in the U.S., in 1875, Mary McGladery met Chew Diep (also spelled as Jeu Dip, rendered Zhao Xia in pinyin), a prospector from Xinning County, Guangdong, who had come to San Francisco in 1869 at age 12. The family, housing four children, later converted to Presbyterianism, with Chew Diep taking on an anglicized, reversed version of his name Joseph C. Tape (Chew was originally his surname), and Mary matching his last name in marriage. Joseph had worked many jobs during his time in the US, including being a dray man and an interpreter for the Chinese Consulate. The family lived near the start of Powell Street, just on the edge of the west side of Chinatown.Their four children, Mamie, Frank, Emily, and Gertrude, were all born one after the other, with Mamie being the oldest. The family filled their time with maintaining relationships with white friends and pursuing hobbies associated with the middle-class American life. They adapted their Chinese custom of having a Chinese midwife help deliver children at home to instead having a white doctor and nurse deliver their four children at their home.

== Tape vs. Hurley ==
=== Background on School Segregation in California: Late 1800's ===
Education in San Francisco was heavily segregated in the 1800’s all the way to the mid 1900’s. One reason for this was the high anti-Chinese sentiment due to fear of Chinese workers taking up the small number of jobs available at the time. Following the Panic of 1873, anti-Chinese sentiment grew in areas such as San Francisco as a reaction to high levels of joblessness. These feelings grew into a larger movement that eventually manifested itself in part as the Chinese Exclusion act.

These societal anti-immigrant and pro-segregation feelings spilled over into all aspects of life, including the emerging public education sector. In 1851, the first public school in San Francisco opened its doors only for white students. Schools for minority children would also open shortly after, with an African American school opening in 1854, and an Asian American school opening in 1859. Education for Chinese Children would not be available for long.

African American students would get their right to attend public schools in 1870, and segregation in schools for Chinese students would be prohibited in Tape v. Hurley in 1885 (although segregation would be reintroduced in 1902).

=== Tape v. Hurley ===
When Mamie Tape was old enough to enter the education system in San Francisco, her parents, Mary and Joseph, wanted to send her to the Spring Valley Primary School. However, due to her Chinese heritage, they were turned away by principal Jennie Hurley. Even more unfortunately, the Tape family was not the only one to experience this exclusion by the school as other Chinese American applicants had been turned away as well. Infuriated by this discrimination against Asian Americans, Mary and Joseph took their beliefs to the next step by suing the San Francisco Board of Education and taking their case to the California Supreme Court. This court case, Tape vs. Hurley displayed the clear discrimination towards, and segregation of Chinese Americans as well as made progress towards the full and equal rights of Asian Americans in the United States.

The goal of many racist school systems in California was to segregate the students so that the Chinese American children would be separate. “The thinking was that if the city had to provide the Chinese with access to public education, then they will do so in segregated schools.” So, when the Tapes’ took their case to the California Supreme Court, the main question that was being asked was “whether a child “between six and twenty-one years of age, of Chinese parentage, but who was born and has always lived in the city and county of San Francisco," is entitled to admission in the public school of the district in which she resides." Had this case been brought to the supreme court earlier, the Tapes would have likely lost, since the legislation had been changed approximately five years prior to the instance. Before 1880, the legislation only clarified that education of a child was only completely open if the child was white. However, in 1880, the law was changed so that any child could enter the education system regardless of their race, unless they had a serious disease. Furthermore, it was Mamie Tapes 14th Amendment Right that she was treated fairly by the California education system as a part of the equal protection clause that defended Chinese American children. Thus, the court declared that principal Jennie Hurley had unfairly and unlawfully turned away Mary Tapes daughter due to her Chinese Heritage. Specifically, the judges involved in the case said, “The board of education has power "to make, establish, and enforce all necessary and proper rules and regulations not contrary to law," and none other.”

This win for Chinese Americans at the time set a standard in the education system that children of Chinese heritage have equal rights as white children and could not be denied them. Although Mary Tape's success in the defense of Chinese American children was a step forward, discrimination did not come to a full stop. Mary Tape again attempted to enroll her daughter into the Spring Valley Primary School after winning the case but was again denied. This time it was due to the overfilled class size and lack of vaccinations. She again fought for her daughter since she believed that the reason Mamie Tape was not permitted to enroll was still because she was Chinese American. Mary approached her fight by framing her daughter as a true American, despite her family not fitting into the typical "American family" box. She published her letters in newspapers that reached the other side of the country. In one specific letter, she says, “May you Mr. Moulder (superintendent of the Spring Valley Primary School district) never be persecuted like the way you persecuted little Mamie Tape…I will let the world see Sir what justice there is when it is govern(ed) by the race prejudice Men! Just because she is of the Chinese descend, not because she don't dress like you, because she does. Just because she is descended of Chinese parent: I guess she is more of a(n) American than a good many of you that is going to prevent her from being educated.” Mary Tape's writing in these letters and her resilience still inspired other Asian Americans and brought support to the fight against segregation despite the continued discrimination.

It is of importance to note that the government was not fully in support of Chinese American inclusion either, despite supporting Mary Tape's original case. The same year that Mary Tape won her case, “the California State Assembly enacted Bill 268 to establish separate schools for children of “Mongolian or Chinese” descent and once those schools were established, those children would not be admitted into any other schools.” This was a direct loophole to keep Chinese Americans from going to school with white children and to override the rights laid out in the Constitution and in California State law for Chinese Americans. According to the board, they “claimed that these schools provided a way for Chinese American children to receive a public education.” This comment attempted to show the government was creating opportunities for Chinese American students, when really, they were just trying to promote and uphold segregation. It was pushed for by Andrew Jackson Moulder and the San Francisco Board of Education as an emergency measure.

Mary Tape fought for Asian American rights and against the segregation tactics of the California school system and government. She was successful in her original case, Tape vs. Hurley, when her daughter was not permitted to enroll in Spring Valley Primary School on the basis of her Chinese heritage. Even after she won and her daughter was still not allowed to attend the school, she continued to fight. Instead of going to court, she wrote letters to be published in newspapers to bring awareness to the cause. By publishing these letters, she spread the evidence of discrimination across the country which aroused others to fight. Furthermore, she inspired other court cases that followed Tape vs. Hurley. For example, Brown vs. the Board of Education, which permanently outlawed segregation of all schools for all races and nationalities.

=== Activism ===
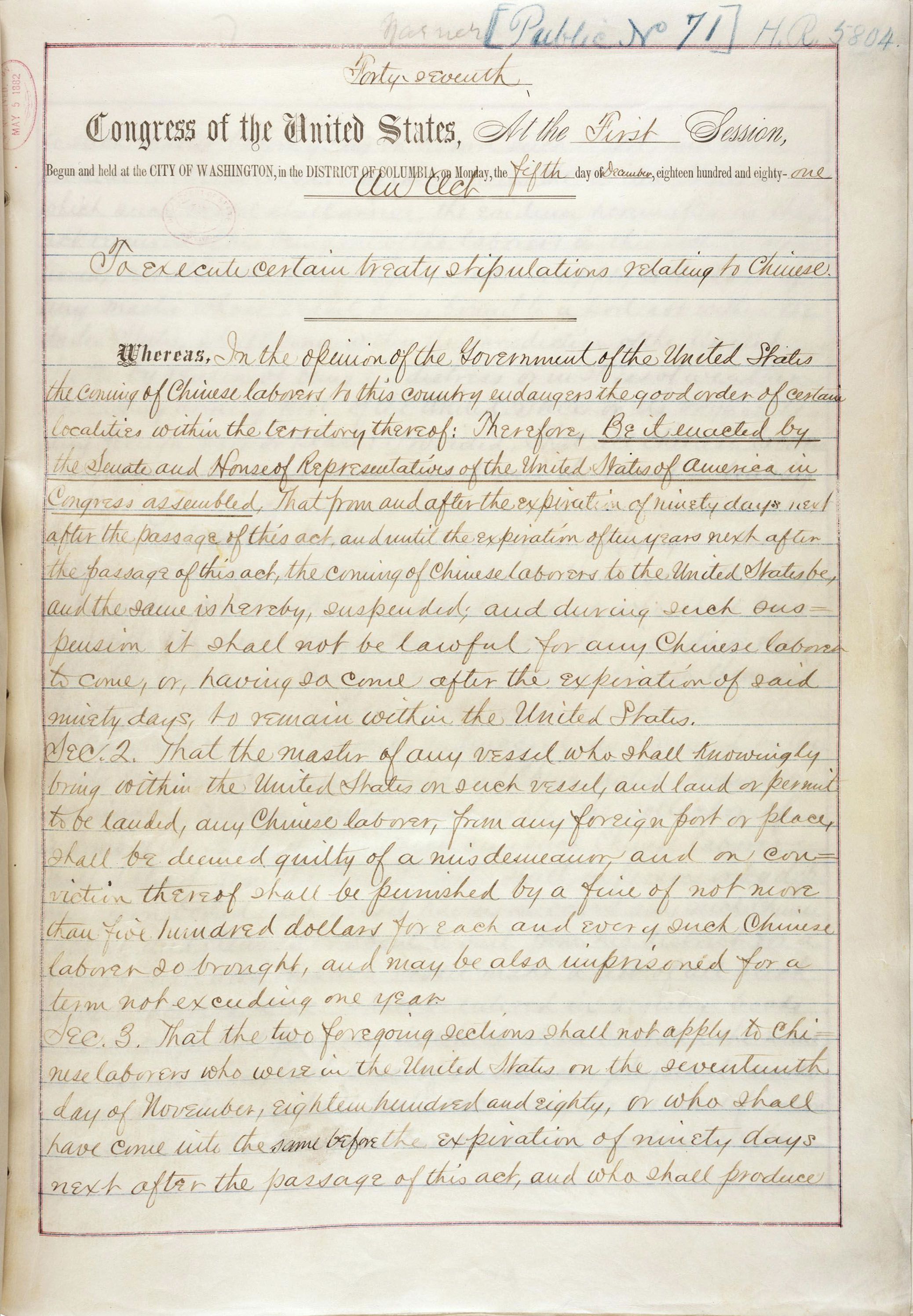
The Chinese Exclusion Act of 1882

Mary Tape was a figure who is not well acknowledged when it comes to acts of activism against Asian hate. Mary Tape was most known for how she fought against segregation in schools. Yet this isn't the only act of activism that Mary Tape took part in. For example, in Tape's lifetime she had done a lot to challenge the Chinese Exclusion Act of 1882. One way that Mary Tape challenged the Chinese Exclusion Act of 1882 was in a letter to the San Francisco School Board. In this letter she highlighted the unfairness of the act and her experience with it. This shows another act of activism completed by Mary Tape because it mentions the unfair treatment that she was receiving due to being a Chinese American and how she challenged the unfair and excluding acts that had been created.

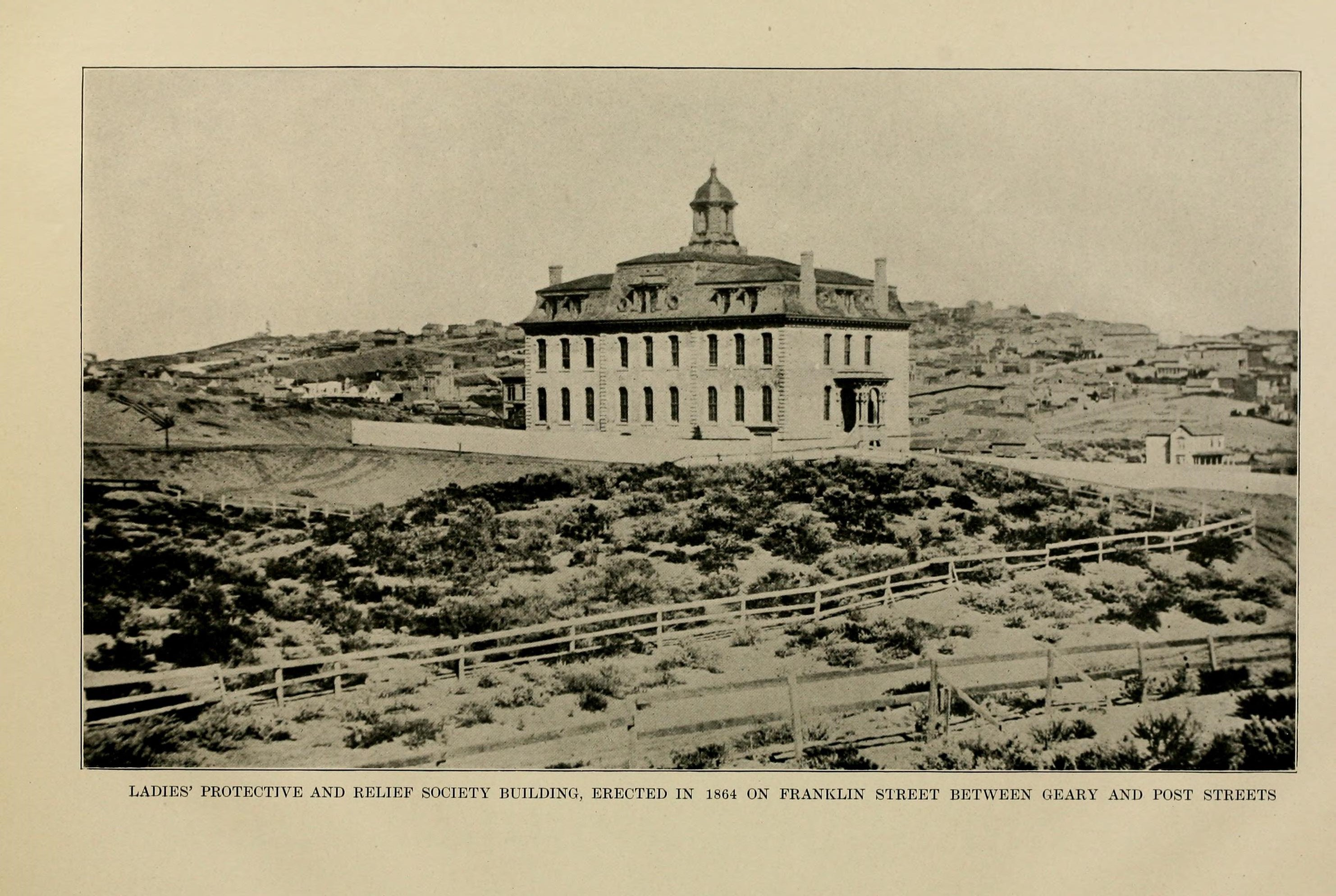
The Ladies Relief Society Home Mary Tape stayed at upon arriving in the United States

== Personal life and death ==
After the Tape v. Hurley case, the Tape children still went to a segregated school. However, lots of schools in California were becoming desegregated. As the Tape family moved around to Chinatown, the Tape Children, Mamie and Frank, attended a new Chinese primary school. Eventually the family moved to Berkeley where the children were able to attend a completely desegregated school. Even after the case happened it still caught the attention of news and many journalists.

Mary Tape had other interests and skills she focused on afterwards. In an interview with the Tape family, they shared their interests and talents they had. Mary was a landscape painter and a photographer, but she was most skilled at being a telegrapher. She would often send messages to her husband when he was at work. Mary was a skilled artist and a first-class photographer. One of her children, Emily, was a violinist. Joseph Tape, her husband, was an interpreter for the Imperial Consulate of China in their city. Their son, Frank, worked with Joseph in his business. The whole family was very full of skills and talents that many do not know about.

Mary Tape died on October 9, 1934, two weeks after the death of her daughter Emily and five months before her husband died. Ultimately, she was successful in getting her children to desegregated schools and left an impact in the fight for desegregating schools. Around 20 years after her death, the United States Supreme Court delivered its opinion in Brown v. Board of Education which finally outlawed racial segregation across the nation.
