= Andrew Jackson Moulder =

American educator (1825–1895)

Engraving of Moulder published 1858

Andrew Jackson Moulder (March 7, 1825 – October 15, 1895) was an American educator and author who was the superintendent of schools in California and superintendent of schools in San Francisco. He supported excluding minorities from public schools in California.

Moulder was born on March 7, 1825, in Washington, D.C., and he attended Columbia College. He was elected state superintendent of schools in California in 1856 and re-elected in 1859. He advocated for establishment of a public university in California and for establishment of the Pacific Stock Exchange. True to his name, he was a Jacksonian Democrat.

He advocated for laws separating Asian Americans from white students. He said "The great mass of our citizens will not associate in terms of equality with these inferior races, nor will they consent that their children do so". Silas Selleck photographed him.

== Writings ==
- Commentaries on the school law, with the elements of school architecture. Laws relating to the school lands. Forms and instructions published by J. O'Meara, State Printer (1858)
- The advantages of association of ideas in teaching. Addressed to the teachers and school officers of California, published by B.P. Avery, State Printer (1862)

== See also ==
- Tape v. Hurley – 1885 California Supreme Court case
