= National Register of Historic Places listings in Nevada County, California =

Location of Nevada County in California

This is a list of the National Register of Historic Places listings in Nevada County, California.

This is intended to be a complete list of the properties and districts on the National Register of Historic Places in Nevada County, California, United States. Latitude and longitude coordinates are provided for many National Register properties and districts; these locations may be seen together in an online map.

There are 25 properties and districts listed on the National Register in the county, including 2 National Historic Landmarks.

This National Park Service list is complete through NPS recent listings posted September 4, 2026.

== Current listings ==
	Name on the Register	Image	Date listed	Location	City or town	Description
1	Boca Dam	Boca Dam	March 25, 1981 (#81000712)	S end of Boca Reservoir; 39°23′26″N 120°05′36″W	Truckee	
2	Bridgeport Covered Bridge	Bridgeport Covered Bridge	July 14, 1971 (#71000168)	SW of French Corral over S. Yuba River; 39°17′01″N 121°11′40″W	French Corral	
3	Commercial Row-Brickelltown Historic District	Commercial Row-Brickelltown Historic District	October 8, 2009 (#09000803)	Roughly the north side of Donner Pass Rd. from Bridge St. westwards approx. 1,700 ft. 39°19′39″N 120°11′12″W	Truckee	
4	Davis Mill	Davis Mill	April 1, 2010 (#10000157)	Off North Bloomfield Road; 3 miles NE of Nevada City; 39°17′26″N 120°59′18″W	Nevada City	
5	Donner Camp	Donner Camp	October 15, 1966 (#66000218)	2.6 miles (4.2 km) W of Truckee on U.S. 40; 39°21′18″N 120°11′27″W	Truckee	
6	Empire Mine	Empire Mine	December 9, 1977 (#77000318)	SE of Grass Valley at 338 E. Empire St. 39°12′13″N 121°02′34″W	Grass Valley	Boundary increase on 2013-04-10
7	Foote's Crossing Road		January 29, 1981 (#81000180)	Tahoe National Forest; 39°24′53″N 120°57′35″W	North Columbia	
8	Grass Valley Public Library	Grass Valley Public Library	March 26, 1992 (#92000267)	207 Mill St. 39°12′58″N 121°03′50″W	Grass Valley	
9	Kruger House	Kruger House	June 17, 1982 (#82002220)	10292 Donner Pass Rd. 39°19′35″N 120°11′18″W	Truckee	
10	Malakoff Diggins-North Bloomfield Historic District	Malakoff Diggins-North Bloomfield Historic District	April 11, 1973 (#73000418)	Graniteville Star Route; 39°22′16″N 120°54′44″W	North Bloomfield	
11	Martin Luther Marsh House	Martin Luther Marsh House	April 11, 1973 (#73000415)	254 Boulder St. 39°16′03″N 121°00′32″W	Nevada City	
12	Meadow Lake Petroglyphs		May 6, 1971 (#71000169)	Address Restricted	French Lake	
13	Mount St. Mary's Academy and Convent	Mount St. Mary's Academy and Convent	May 3, 1974 (#74000543)	Church and Chapel Sts. 39°12′53″N 121°04′03″W	Grass Valley	
14	National Exchange Hotel	National Exchange Hotel	October 25, 1973 (#73000416)	211 Broad St. 39°15′45″N 121°01′01″W	Nevada City	
15	Nevada Brewery	Nevada Brewery	September 12, 1985 (#85002303)	107 Sacramento St. 39°15′42″N 121°00′53″W	Nevada City	
16	Nevada City Downtown Historic District	Nevada City Downtown Historic District	September 23, 1985 (#85002520)	Roughly bounded by Spring, Bridge, Commercial, York, Washington, Coyote, and Main Sts. 39°15′47″N 121°01′03″W	Nevada City	
17	Nevada City Firehouse No. 2	Nevada City Firehouse No. 2	May 3, 1974 (#74000544)	420 Broad St. 39°15′47″N 121°01′09″W	Nevada City	
18	Nevada City Free Public Library	Nevada City Free Public Library	December 10, 1990 (#90001809)	211 N. Pine St. 39°15′52″N 121°00′59″W	Nevada City	
19	Nevada Theatre	Nevada Theatre	March 14, 1973 (#73000417)	Broad and Bridge Sts. 39°15′47″N 121°01′09″W	Nevada City	
20	North Star House	North Star House	February 1, 2011 (#10001191)	12075 Old Auburn Rd. 39°11′39″N 121°04′35″W	Grass Valley	
21	Ott's Assay Office	Ott's Assay Office	April 14, 1975 (#75000447)	130 Main St. 39°15′47″N 121°00′56″W	Nevada City	
22	Red Dog Townsite		September 14, 2001 (#01000968)	Address Restricted	Nevada City	
23	Aaron A. Sargent House	Aaron A. Sargent House	June 20, 1980 (#80000825)	449 Broad St. 39°15′49″N 121°01′14″W	Nevada City	
24	Summit Camp		December 13, 2024 (#100011384)	Donner Pass Road; 39°18′55″N 120°19′25″W	Norden vicinity	Archaeological remains of a 19th-century camp of Chinese workers building the nearby railroad; extends into Placer County.
25	Truckee Veterans Memorial Building and Rocking Stone Tower	Truckee Veterans Memorial Building and Rocking Stone Tower	July 14, 2021 (#100006720)	10214 High St. 39°19′40″N 120°11′19″W	Truckee	

== See also ==
- List of National Historic Landmarks in California
- National Register of Historic Places listings in California
- California Historical Landmarks in Nevada County, California
