= First long-distance telephone line =

World's First Long-Distance Telephone Line
- Location: Pleasant Valley Road; French Corral, California

History
- Built: 1877; 149 years ago

Site notes
- Architect: Ridge Telephone Company

California Historical Landmark
- Reference no.: 247

The world's first long-distance telephone line, established in 1877, connected French Corral with Bowman Lake (previously known as French Lake) at the headwaters of the Yuba River. It was strung across trees and poles for a distance of 60 mi (97 km) in Nevada County, California, passing through Birchville, Sweetland, North San Juan, Cherokee, North Columbia, Lake City, North Bloomfield, Moores Flat, Graniteville, and Milton.

The line was operated by the Ridge Telephone Company for the service of Milton Mining and Water Company, as well as other water companies. The line was an improvement over the system used in nearby Downieville, California.

== Historical landmark ==
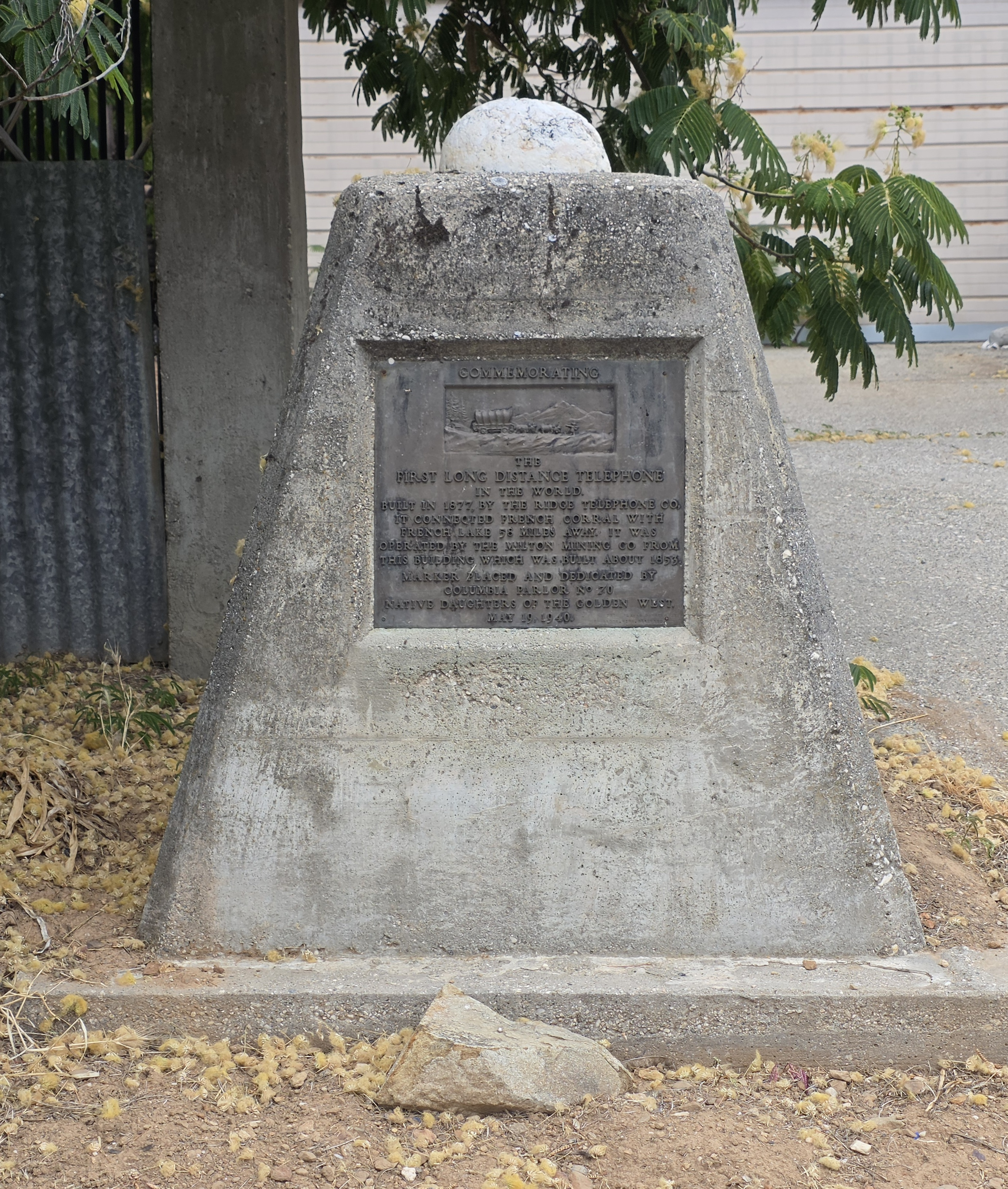
First Long Distance Telephone In The World historic site marker

The site is now a California Historical Landmark. The marker is inscribed:

WORLD'S FIRST LONG-DISTANCE TELEPHONE LINE

The first long-distance telephone in the world, built in 1877 by the Ridge Telephone Company, connected French Corral with French Lake, 58 miles away. It was operated by the Milton Mining Company from a building on this site that had been erected about 1853.

== See also ==
- California Historical Landmarks in Nevada County
- History of the telephone
- Timeline of the telephone
