= Lake City, Nevada County, California =

Unincorporated community in California, United States

Lake City
- Unincorporated community
- Location of Lake City in California
- Coordinates: 39°21′31″N 120°56′30″W
- Country: United States
- State: California
- County: Nevada
- Elevation: 3,386 ft (1,032 m)
- Time zone: UTC-8 (Pacific (PST))
  - Summer (DST): UTC-7 (PDT)
- ZIP code: 95959
- Area code: 530

Lake City is an unincorporated community in Nevada County, California. It lies at an elevation of 3,300 feet (1,000 m) about 10 miles (16 km) northeast of Nevada City as the crow flies, and about 3 miles (5 km) southeast of North Columbia, and 3 miles (5 km) southwest of North Bloomfield. It is located at the junction of modern day North Bloomfield, Back Bone, and Lake City Roads. It was an important mining and transportation center in the second half of the 19th century.

== Early history ==
Lake City was founded in 1853 when Israel Joiner built a cabin there. Two years later, a group known as the Dutch Hill Company began mining there. In 1855, the Bell brothers built a hotel, and for a while the town was known as Bell's Ranch. In 1857, the Irwin ditch, which brought water from Poorman's Creek about 12 miles (19 km) away, reached town, and it began to boom as a center for hydraulic mining. Many of the early residents were French, and French culture and language were common. In 1858, the Eureka Lake Co., which had taken over the Irwin ditch, laid out a town, anchored by its district office. Inspired by a reservoir or "lake" the Company had built, it was named Lake City. Politically, it was part of Bloomfield Township. That same year, the Lake City Hotel, also called the French Hotel, opened, with a restaurant and a saloon. In 1862, a third hotel, the Bordas, opened next to the French Hotel. In addition to the hotels, the town had several stores, a tailor shop, and a saw mill, which burned down in 1871. The town also had a canvas hose factory and a number of homes. Lake City had its own school and election districts. A Catholic church was consecrated in 1872. The population at its heyday was estimated at about 300. By 1880, the town had been reduced to one hotel, one store, one saloon, a blacksmith shop, a livery stable and several homes. The 1880 census counted 93 residents.

== Prominent residents ==
Henry Arnold took over the Bell Brothers hotel, which burned down in 1859. He rebuilt the hotel, now called Arnold House, and held several prominent balls there. He also experimented with planting fruit trees on his ranch, managing to produce very large apples. At times, Lake City was referred to as Arnold's Ranch.

Julius Poquillon, a prominent miner and engineer on the Ridge, opened the Lake City Hotel, complete with French restaurant, in 1858. Reportedly, he sold memberships in the Lake City Yacht Club.

In 1860, Poquillon sold his hotel to Marius Dominique and Henrietta Bremond, who renamed it Bremond House, and operated it until it burned in 1872. The family continued to run a hotel in nearby North Bloomfield.

In 1866, P. A. Paine, a native of Painesville, Ohio, bought 300 acres (120 ha) in Lake City and took over the Bell Brothers/Arnold hotel. Mr. Paine continued the successful apple orchard, once producing a pound and a half pippin.

Francis M. Pridgeon for many years was the elected member of the county Board of Supervisors for District 3, which included much of the Ridge. In endorsing his reelection, a newspaper observed: "Pridgeon has been one of the best supervisors this county has ever had or ever will have." His wife Elizabeth operated the hotel, which they took over from Mr. Paine.

William and Bridget Waldron owned the town's general store and stable and had a number of other prominent positions.

== Fires ==
As with many mining communities, fire was a constant threat, and Lake City experienced several major ones. In 1859, the Bell Brothers hotel burned down. In 1868, fire destroyed the Lake House hotel, and several other buildings. In 1869, the school and blacksmith shop burned down. In 1872, fire destroyed the Bremond House hotel, and several other buildings. Arson was suspected. In 1873, a fire "threatened the destruction of the town" but it escaped that fate.

== School and election districts ==
Lake City had its own school district and schoolhouse and its own election district. The schoolhouse burned down in 1869. In 1873, the "new" schoolhouse was described as being in "poor" condition, needing to be replaced "as soon as fortune favors." The school then had 32 pupils and 1 teacher. It had 43 students in 1880 but by 1888, the number had fallen to 20. In 1894, the school district was declared lapsed and students had to go to North Bloomfield.

In 1865, the Board of Supervisors established an election district at Lake City. Voting was liveliest in local elections. In the 1873 county election, 61 people voted. By contrast, 16 total votes were cast in the 1880 presidential election. In 1892, 14 voted in a local election, and soon the Supervisors abolished the Lake City election district. Residents had to vote in North Bloomfield.

== Mining ==
The area was considered part of the North Bloomfield mining district, which was located on auriferous gravel beds which ran down the San Juan Ridge, and often branched out. One rich branch ran from N. Columbia through Lake City and on towards Red Dog and You Bet. Hydraulic mining took off with the arrival of ditch water. The principal ditch was the Eureka, which brought water from dams in the high Sierra, and channelled it to Lake City through the Irwin ditch. Principal mines were the North Star, McDonald, I XL and Ballarat. Following the 1884 Sawyer decision, which prohibited discharging mining debris into the Yuba River or its tributaries, hydraulic mining rapidly declined. Soon thereafter, it was estimated that 130,000,000 yards of auriferous gravel remained to be mined.

In the early part of the 20th century, there were efforts to revive hydraulic mining but most efforts were directed to drifting, or quartz mining. Prominent were Mr. F. M. Phelps, the El Oro Mines Company and the Paine Brothers. These efforts do not appear to have succeeded.

== Transportation ==
Taking advantage of its strategic location at the junction of the principal roads between Nevada City and many of the mining communities on the San Juan Ridge, and later on one of the roads to the Henness Pass and the Nevada mines, Lake City was an important transportation stop for travelers and teamsters. For many years, the road to Nevada City was a toll road owned by Edwards and Manchester. Toll roads were usually well maintained. Had the Central Pacific Railroad determined to run the Transcontinental Railroad through the Henness Pass, the planned route would have gone through Lake City.

Built in 1855, the Bell Brothers hotel continued for many years, operated in turn by Henry Arnold, P.A. Paine, Elizabeth Pridgeon, and Frank Kropp. Mr. Kropp ran it for many years into the 20th century, attracting visitors with a 13 rattle "monster" rattlesnake on display. In 1858, the Lake City Hotel opened. It soon became Bremond House. There is mention of a third hotel, the Bordas, open in the 1860s.

Lake City was a stop on the Gregory & English stage and pony express line between Nevada City and Graniteville, on the Summit City (Meadow Lake) Stage Line from Grass Valley and on Dornin's Express Line between North San Juan and North Bloomfield.

It was also connected to the Ridge Telephone Company's long distance telephone line.

== Today ==
The town declined as hydraulic mining declined, especially after the 1884 Sawyer decision. In 1886, a local newspaper reported that "Lake City, like nearly all the hydraulic mining towns in this county, looks much like a deserted village." Over the last century, mining has gradually been replaced by ranching and horticulture. In 1939, an observer reported that: “A picture of decay is LAKE CITY, ... where two or three decrepit houses and a forlorn hotel (1855), its balcony sagging drunkenly, huddle by the grassy depression in the pasture which was once the "lake.” Today, it is a very rural outpost with a few ranches and residences and a vineyard planted about 30 years ago. There are no commercial establishments, and no readily visible remains of its historic past.
