= Davis Mill =

Davis Mill may refer to the following places:

- Davis Mill, New Brunswick, Canada
- Davis Mill (Nevada City, California), listed on the National Register of Historic Places
- Davis Mill (Gallia County, Ohio), listed on the National Register of Historic Places
