= French Lake, California =

French Lake
- Former settlement
- Interactive map of French Lake
- Coordinates: 39.420556°N 120.540833°W
- Country: United States
- State: California
- County: Nevada County

French Lake, California located in Nevada County, was a California Gold Rush community, now uninhabited. It was located by a lake of the same name.

== Reservoir ==
French Lake
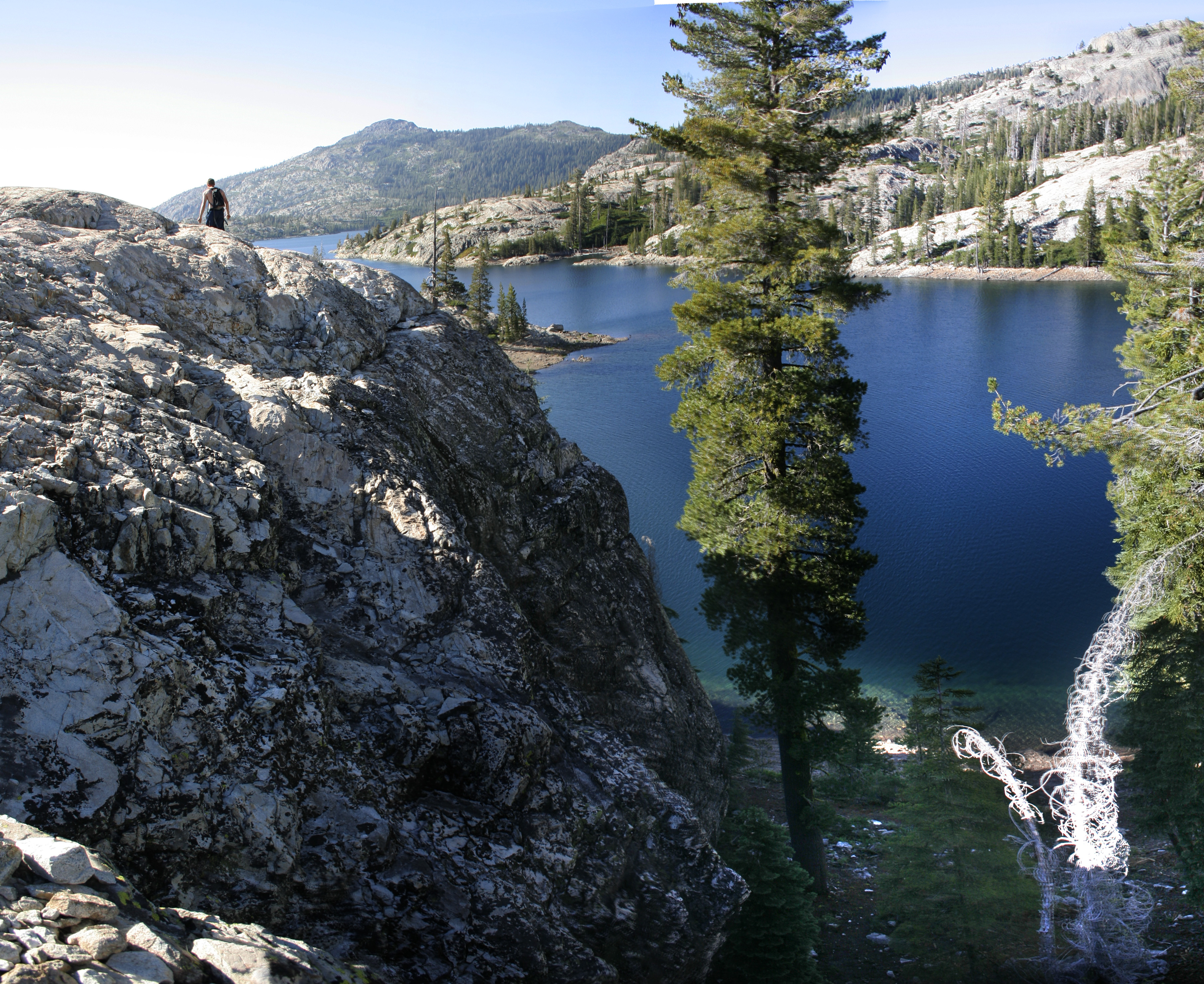
- Southwest shore of French Lake, 2010

- Location within California
- Location: Nevada County, California
- Coordinates: 39°25′14″N 120°32′31″W
- Basin countries: United States
- Surface elevation: 6,676 ft (2,035 m)

French Lake Reservoir, at an elevation of 7500’-6680’, is part of a string of lakes, including Bowman Lake, Sawmill Lake, and Faucherie Lake to the northwest, as well as Meadow Lake and Fordyce Lake to the southeast. French Lake Road, used by the Nevada Irrigation District and not available for public use, skirts the lake's northwest perimeter before heading east to Meadow Lake Road. An unsigned road near the lake's southeastern banks veers northeast to Meadow Lake Road above English Mountain's now uninhabited Baltimore Town and Summit City in unincorporated Nevada County.

== History ==
Prior to the Maidu, French Lake was inhabited by the Martis people, a now extinct Native American tribe. The Martis' Meadow Lake Petroglyphs (also known as 4-Nev-3) are a historical landmark.

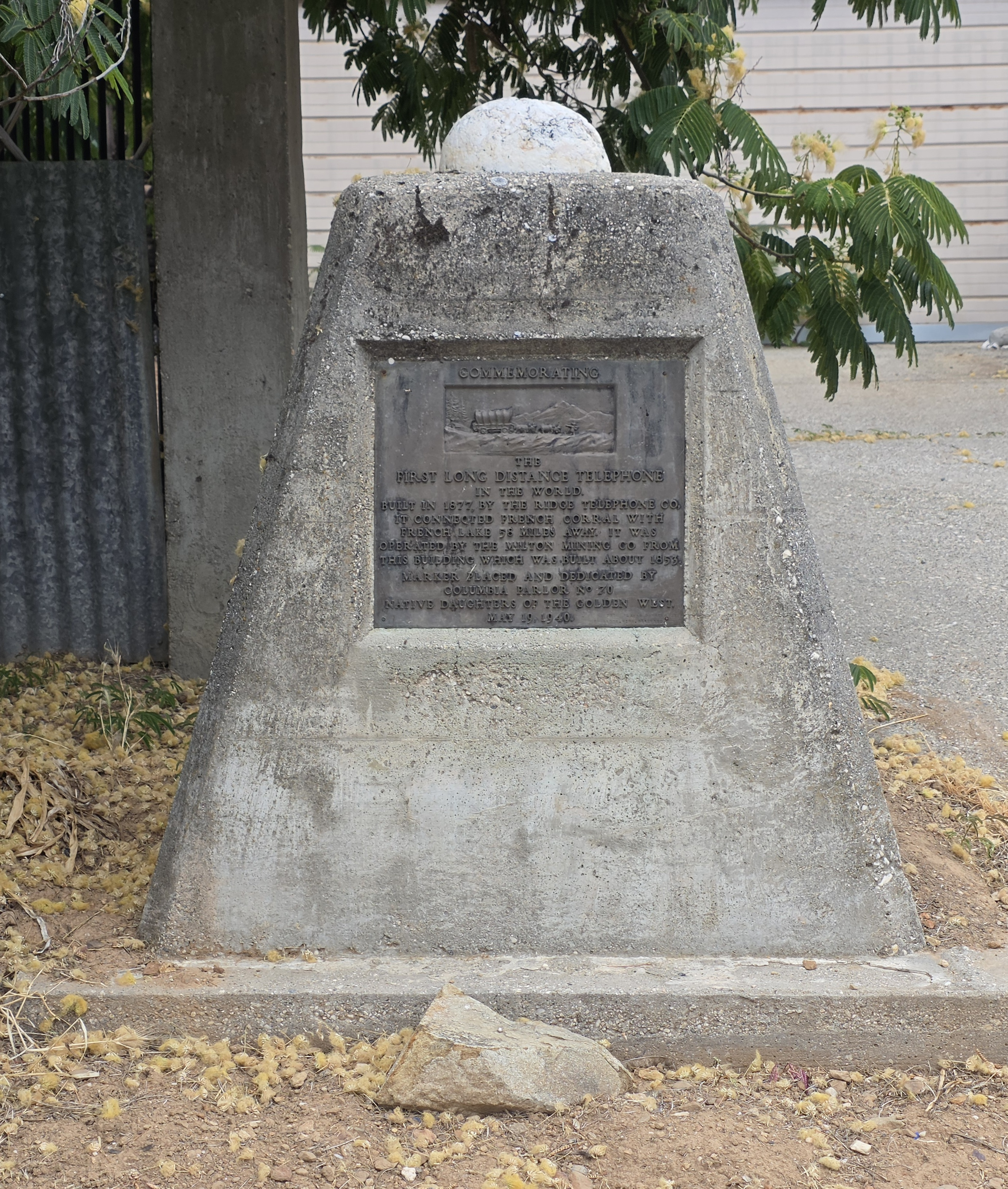
First Long Distance Telephone In The World historic site marker in French Corral, California

In 1878, the world's first long-distance telephone line operated between French Lake and French Corral, California, 58 miles to the west, including the towns of North San Juan, and North Bloomfield on the phone route. The phone line was used to pass information regarding water flow from French Lake for post-California Gold Rush hydraulic mining.
