= Rose's Corral, California =

Coordinates: 39.2644°N 121.1977°W

Rose's Corral
- Former settlement
- Interactive map of Rose's Corral
- Country: United States
- State: California
- County: Nevada County
- Established: Summer 1848
- Time zone: UTC-8 (Pacific (PST))
  - Summer (DST): UTC-7 (PDT)

Rose's Corral is a former settlement in Nevada County, California, United States. It was located on the lower San Juan Ridge, between Anthony House on Deer Creek (a tributary of the South Yuba River) and Bridgeport on the South Yuba River. The merchant John Rose built it close to a trading post he had erected near where Pleasant Valley Road meets Del Mar Way (which very briefly becomes Piper Lane just before the intersection). Established during the summer of 1848, it is notable for being the county's first settlement. It is named for a cattle corral built by John Rose, a trader.
