= Kruger House =

Kruger House may refer to:

- Kruger House, Pretoria, South African Republic
- Kruger House (Truckee, California), United States
