= Martin Luther Marsh House =

Historic house in California, United States

- Marsh, Martin Luther, House
- U.S. National Register of Historic Places
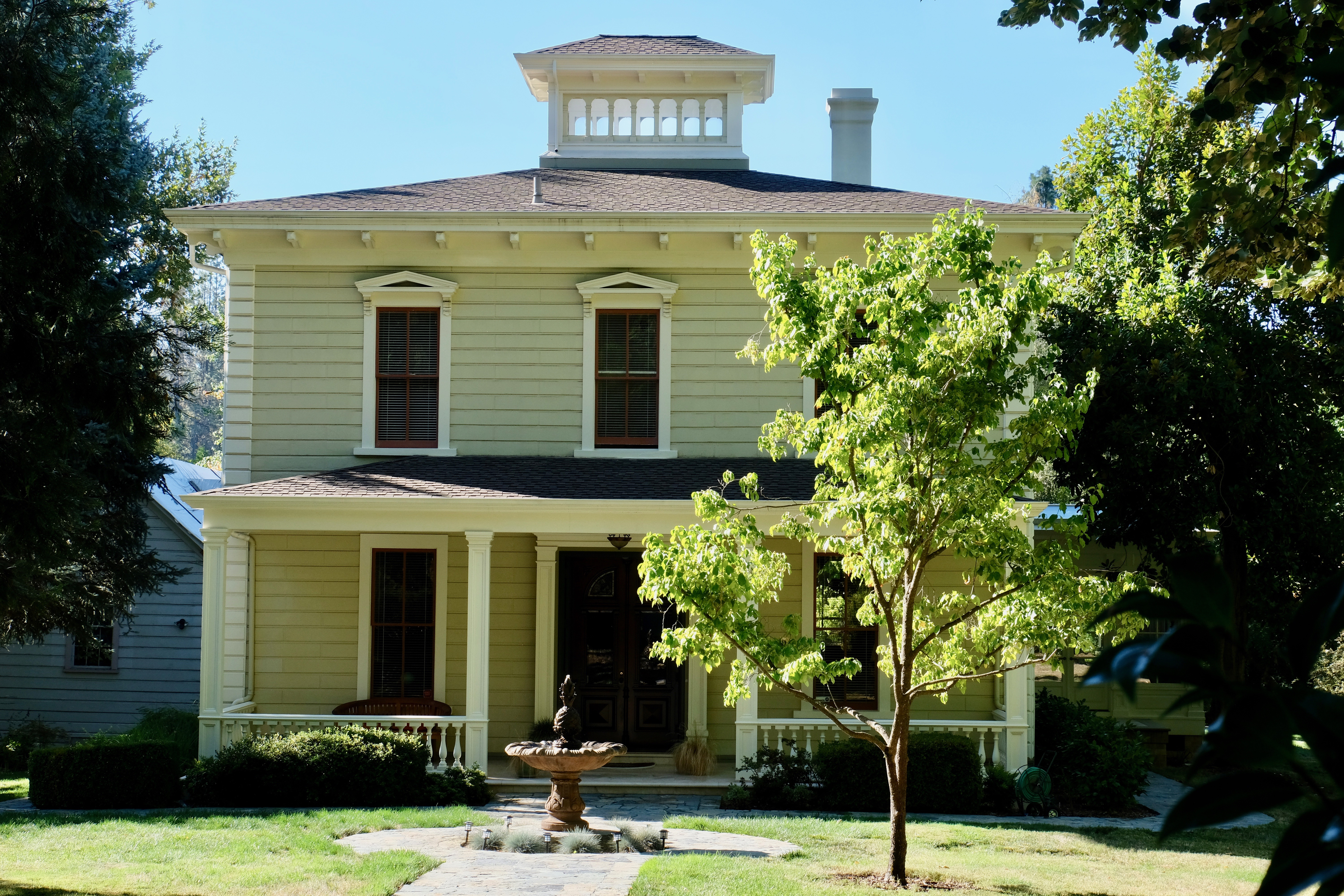

- Location within California Location within the United States
- Location: 254 Boulder Street; Nevada City, California
- Coordinates: 39°16′3″N 121°0′32″W
- Built: 1873
- Architectural style: Georgian
- NRHP reference No.: 73000415
- Added to NRHP: 1973-04-11

The Martin Luther Marsh House is a historic house located at 254 Boulder Street in Nevada City, in the Gold Country of Nevada County, California. It was built in 1873.

== History ==
The Martin Luther Marsh House's architecture and engineering were significant during the California Gold Rush period of 1850–1874. The single family home is of Georgian design. It bears a hip roofed cupola and the windows are arched.

== Restoration ==
Briefly in the 1970s, the Marsh House was the American Victorian Museum, founded by Carol and David Fluke, (owners/funding,) Ruthe Hamm, (owner/funding,) and co-founders David Osborne and Charles Woods.

Recent restoration in the late 1990s by a well known Victorian architectural contractor from San Francisco saw a complete interior restoration and replacement of natural woods, new stained glass, a new conservatory on the west side with 3 walls of glass. The dining room has an outstanding stained glass ceiling and an antique crystal ceiling piece. The exterior restoration included replacement of the rotting quoins with redwood duplicates, a new roof, rain gutters, and exterior painting in historical colors, including white trim. It's situated in a park-like setting on Boulder Street 1/2 mile east of the downtown Nevada City core.

== Landmark ==
On 19 January 1972, the Martin Luther Marsh House was designated a California Point of Historical Interest No. P241.

Less than a year later, on 11 April 1973, this Nevada County building was designated as a landmark by the National Register of Historic Places.

== See also ==
- National Register of Historic Places listings in Nevada County, California
