= Birchville, California =

Birchville
- Former settlement
- Location in California
- Coordinates: 39°19′40″N 121°08′36″W
- Country: United States
- State: California
- County: Nevada County
- Elevation: 1,765 ft (538 m)

Birchville (until 1853, Johnson's Diggings) is a historic mining and agricultural community in Nevada County, California. Birchville is located about 10 miles northwest of Nevada City and about 2 miles northeast of French Corral. It is situated at an elevation of 1,765 ft (538 m) above sea level.

== History ==
Originally called Johnson’s Diggings, Birchville was established in 1851 by prospector David Johnson. That same year, the Miners' and Mechanics' Steam Sawmill was built, encouraging miners to locate in the area and a town to develop. In 1852, the first commercial building, a store and boarding house, was built. In 1853, the growing town was renamed Birchville, in honor of Lumon Birch Adsit, a local merchant.

=== Early mining days ===
Early mining relied on water from nearby creeks. In 1857, the Middle Yuba Canal reached Birchville, though its utility was delayed because the miners went on strike until the water rates were lowered to 30 cents per miners inch of water. Birchville soon became a center for hydraulic mining on the San Juan Ridge. In 1865, one paper commented: "We understand that more money is being taken out at Birchville than at all other points on the Ridge." That winter, the Birchville mines reportedly yielded $581,000 in gold. After 1870, water was also supplied by the Milton Mining and Water Company from its English Reservoir. In 1872, The Bed Rock Tunnel Company excavated a 2900 foot long bedrock tunnel shaft near Birchville, then the longest tunnel in the State, at a cost of $36,000 (~$838,085 in 2024).

=== The Roaring 60s ===
Birchville reached its heyday in the 1860s. Its population reached several hundred, of whom 87 voted in 1860. It boasted hotels, saloons, several stores, a blacksmith, a shoemaker and other amenities. It was connected by stage to Marysville and North San Juan. The first private school was opened in 1856 by Mrs. Newell; another was opened by Miss Lyon in 1862. A public school was opened in 1863 in a repurposed miner's cabin. In 1866, the Birchville School District was created. A one room schoolhouse was built in 1874, complete with a 150 volume library. At one point, the school had 75 students. Birchville was connected to the world's first long distance telephone line, established in 1878, to link the mining communities around the San Juan Ridge.

=== St. Columcille's Church ===
In 1865, the San Juan and Bridgeport Union Guard, under the command of Captain Francis Coffey, built its armory in Birchville, which is midway between North San Juan and Bridgeport. The armory fell into disuse after the Civil War. In 1869, the armory building was purchased by Father Dalton. It became St. Columcille’s Catholic Church and continued as a place of worship until 1955. In 1969, it was purchased by Bart "Babe" Pinaglia, known affectionately as Mr. San Juan, who donated the building to the State of California. It was dismantled, and in 1971, moved to Malakoff State Historic Park, some 15 miles further up the ridge, where it proudly stands today as a reminder of the colorful history of the San Juan Ridge.

In 2019 the Nevada County Board of Supervisors designated the monument commemorating the town and its St. Columcille’s Catholic Church at 22917 Pleasant Valley Road as Nevada County Historical Landmark NEV 19‑02.

=== The later years ===
By the late 1870s many of the local mines were played out, and miners began to move to richer mining areas. An 1880 history notes that "the leading claims have since worked out, and the village now contains a population of only half a hundred souls." By 1895, Birchville was "very quiet and only a vestige of what it formerly was." Gradually, agriculture became the lifeblood of Birchville. Today, little remains of the historic mining town, except for some scarred land, and the area is pleasantly agricultural and residential.
