= French Lake Reservoir =

Reservoir in Nevada County, California, United States

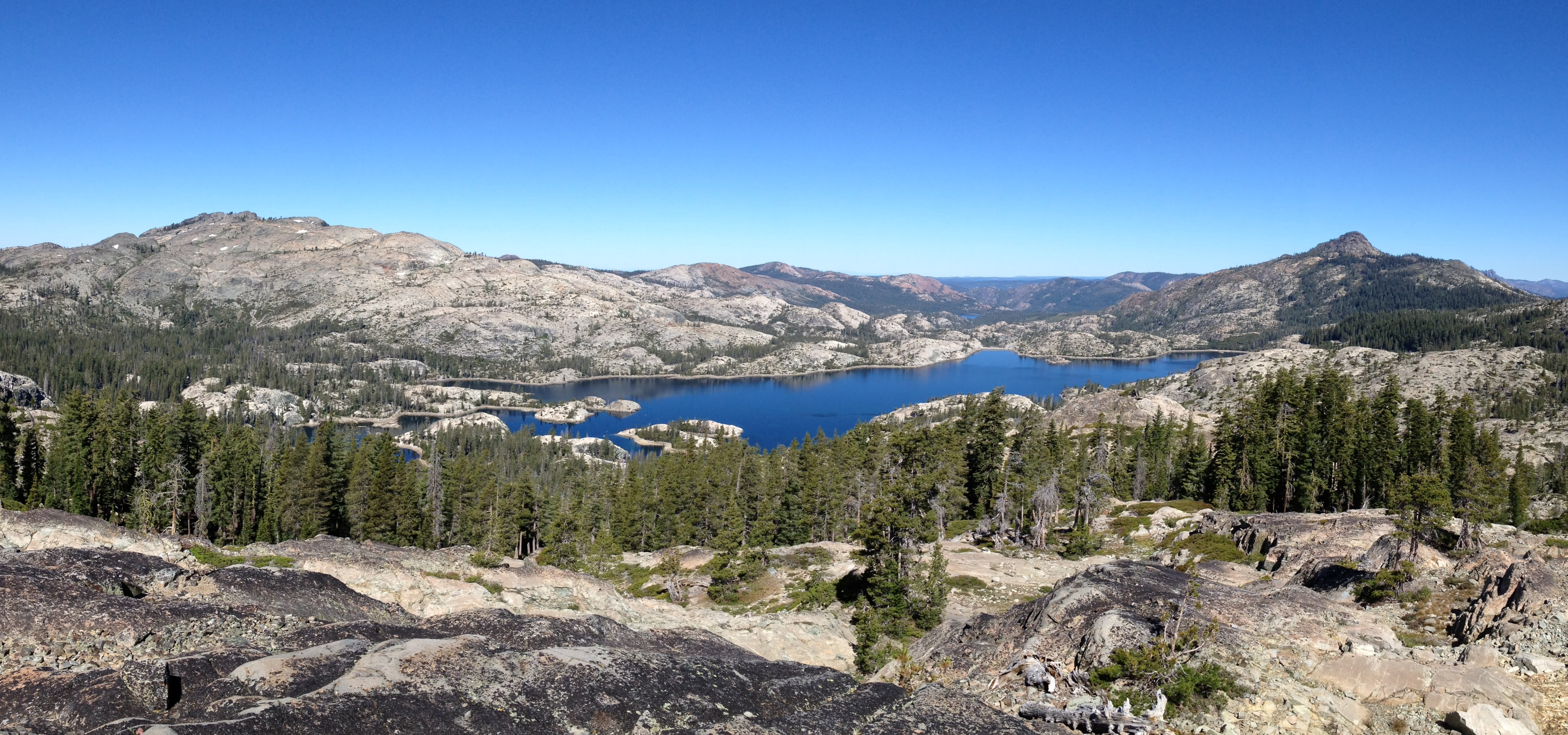

- Location within California
- Location: Nevada County, California, United States
- Coordinates: 39°25′15″N 120°32′32″W
- Built: 1859; 167 years ago, reconstructed 1948; 78 years ago
- Surface area: 1.36 km^{2} (0.53 sq mi)
- Water volume: Max 17,000,000 m^{3} (14,000 acre⋅ft)

French Lake Reservoir (National ID # CA00247) is a reservoir in Nevada County, California.

The earthen, rock-fill French Lake Dam was first constructed in 1859, and is a candidate for the first use of rock-fill in an engineered dam. Reconstructed in 1948, it impounds Canyon Creek for flood control, irrigation water storage, municipal drinking water, and hydropower. The dam is 100 feet (30 m) high, with a length of 300 feet (91 m) at its crest. It is one of ten facilities operated by Nevada Irrigation District.

== Overview ==
French Lake Reservoir has a surface area of 337 acres (136 ha) and a maximum capacity of 13,800 acre-feet (17,000,000 m^{3}). The site is surrounded by Tahoe National Forest. The adjacent namesake townsite of French Lake, California is a ghost town of the California Gold Rush era.

== See also ==
- List of dams and reservoirs in California
- List of lakes in California
