= Nevada Brewery =

- U.S. National Register of Historic Places
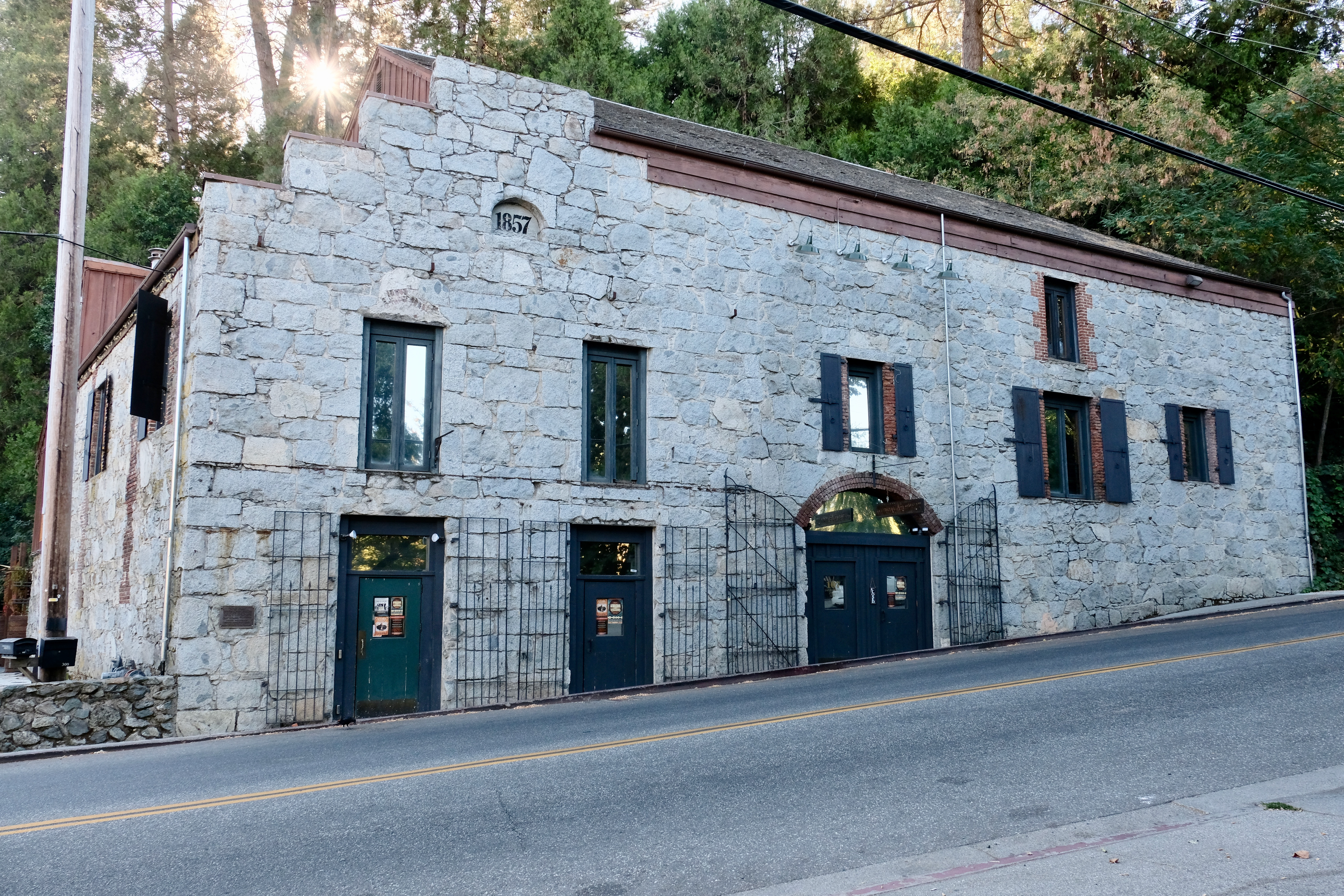
- Nevada Brewery, September 2018

- Location within California Location within the United States
- Location: 107 Sacramento Street; Nevada City, California; United States
- Coordinates: 39°15′42″N 121°0′53″W
- Built: 1882
- NRHP reference No.: 85002303
- Added to NRHP: September 12, 1985

The Nevada Brewery (also known as: Old Nevada Brewery, or Old Stone Brewery, or Stonehouse) is a historic building located at 107 Sacramento Street in Nevada City, California, United States. A brewery on the site dates back to 1857, with granite walls constructed in 1882. The Nevada Brewery's time of significance was during the period of 1850 through 1899. Though its original use was as a brewery, it later served the community as a restaurant, bowling alley, stable, and dance hall.

== Structure ==
In 1882, George Gehrig, a local businessman, hired Italian stonemasons and Chinese laborers to construct a building up the street from the blacksmith's shop. While the architect, builder, and engineer are unknown, the three-story structure was constructed from locally quarried granite blocks. The stone and wood building is 10,000 sq ft (930 m^{2}) in size.

Antique fixtures came from the Sarah and John Kidder home in Grass Valley, California. An owner of the brewery believed that the carved wooden doors were also from the Kidder mansion.

Construction included a storage cave dug into the hillside, used for aging casks of ale. It was accessed from inside the building during the time the building covered a space that's now a patio area. The cave had been connected to other parts of the city via tunnels that were filled in almost a hundred years later when California State Route 49 became a freeway.

After being vacant for more than two decades, the building was reopened as The Old Brewery with great crafted beer and food. It was renovated in 2004 and opened as the Stonehouse Restaurant, featuring an 1884 back-bar from Chicago, Illinois. 2008-2010 As Stonehouse Hospitality Academy trained many students who serve the community.

Since 2010, it became an event venues with a full bar, cave, two kitchens, and three dance floors. Diverse space for office, meeting, class, event, festival. It is located in the heart of downtown Nevada City, with full parking lot next to the Little Deer Creek.

== Historic recognition ==
The Nevada Brewery was listed in the National Register of Historic Places on September 12, 1985.

A bronze plaque attached to the building states:

"The Old Brewery
Constructed of granite blocks from the Sierras about 1882 where Simon C Hieronimus and family brewed and served lager beer to Nevada City, Queen of the Northern Mines and hydraulic mining communities.
Dedicated April 21, 1985"

The Stonehouse was honored in 2008 by the California Heritage Council.

== See also ==
- National Register of Historic Places listings in Nevada County, California
