= Canyon Creek (California) =

River in Nevada County, California, United States

Coordinates: 39°21′40″N 120°45′00″W

Canyon Creek is a major tributary of the South Yuba River in the Sierra Nevada mountain range.

It begins at Baltimore Lake at an elevation of 7,184 feet, roughly 10.8 miles west-northwest of Donner Pass in the Tahoe National Forest in Nevada County, California.

== Course ==
After leaving its headwaters at Baltimore Lake, an alpine glacial lake, it flows due north for less than a mile and enters French Lake Reservoir — a man-made lake created by French Lake Dam, which was first constructed in 1859, reconstructed in 1948, and is managed by the Nevada Irrigation District. After flowing 1.2 miles to the northwest below the dam, Canyon Creek enters its second man-made reservoir — Faucherie Lake. Then, 1.4 miles further northwest, it enters the third of four man-made reservoirs, this time Sawmill Lake, before continuing another mile to the northwest and entering the largest of the four man-made reservoirs — Bowman Lake.

Canyon Creek then proceeds to plunge nearly 3,000 feet in elevation in just 9.1 miles through a steep canyon before its mouth at the South Yuba River at an elevation of 2,800 feet just 2.6 miles due east of the town of Washington, California.

== Recreation ==
It's during this steep, nine-mile section that Canyon Creek is used for recreation in the form of whitewater kayaking. A 2.4 mile Class IV to V run begins at an old bridge site on Arctic Mine Road and treks southwest until its confluence with the South Yuba. The run is functional when flows from Bowman Dam are between 250 and 350 cubic feet per second.

There are dozens of campgrounds for recreational use along Bowman Road during the summer months, and fishing is popular at each of the four man-made lakes, as well as Baltimore Lake.
