= Mount Saint Mary's Convent and Academy =

- Mount Saint Mary's Academy and Convent
- U.S. National Register of Historic Places
- California Historical Landmark
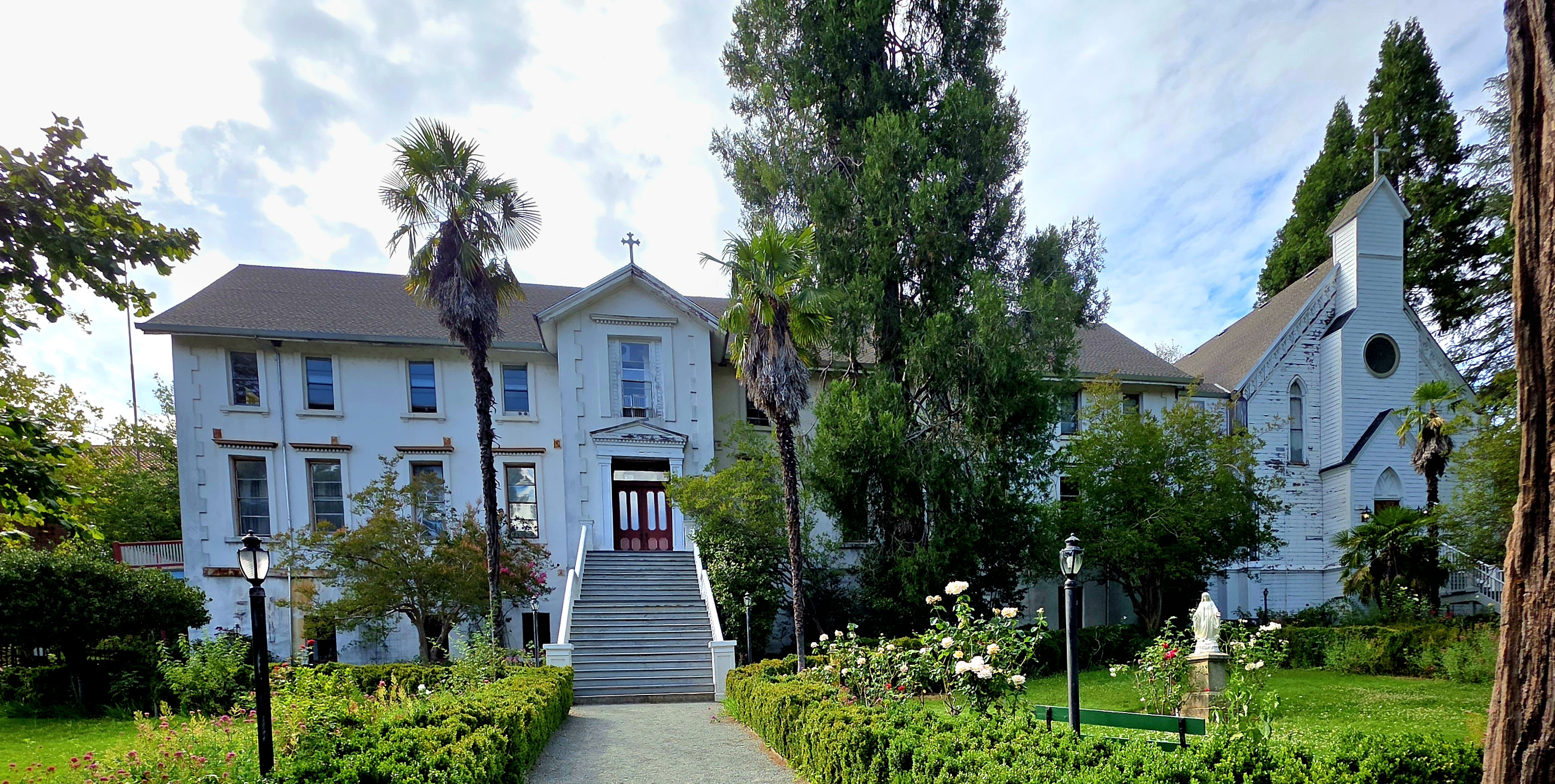
- Mount Saint Mary's Convent and Academy in 2026

- Location within California Location within the United States
- Location: Grass Valley, California
- Coordinates: 39°12′53″N 121°4′3″W
- Built: 1865 or 1866
- Architectural style: Gothic Revival-Renaissance Revival-Georgian Revival-Victorian
- NRHP reference No.: 74000543
- CHISL No.: 855

Significant dates
- Added to NRHP: May 3, 1974
- Designated CHISL: 1972-04-24

Mount Saint Mary's Convent and Academy, originally the Sacred Heart Convent and Holy Angels Orphanage and previously Mount St. Mary's Convent and Orphan Asylum, and also known as Mount Saint Mary's Academy and Convent, is the only extant original orphanage in California and commemorates the Sisters of Mercy, in Grass Valley, Nevada County, California.

The Gothic Revival Style Victorian building with Georgian Revival accents currently houses the Grass Valley Museum, at 410 South Church Street between Chapel and Dalton Streets, Grass Valley.

== History ==
Katherine Russell (sister of Charles Russell, Baron Russell of Killowen and better known as Mother Mary Baptist Russell, or simply "Mother Baptist") arrived in San Francisco with seven other Sisters of Mercy on 1854-12-08 from Kinsale, County Cork, Ireland; other Sisters followed. On 1863-08-20, spearheaded by vicar-general Father Thomas Dalton, five Sisters, including Mother Baptist, arrived in Grass Valley to help the California Gold Rush miners' orphans. Bishop Eugene O'Connell placed the cornerstone for the convent/orphanage building on Sunday, 1865-05-02. The Sisters moved in on 1866-03-20, and the first orphans were taken in on 1866-04-02.

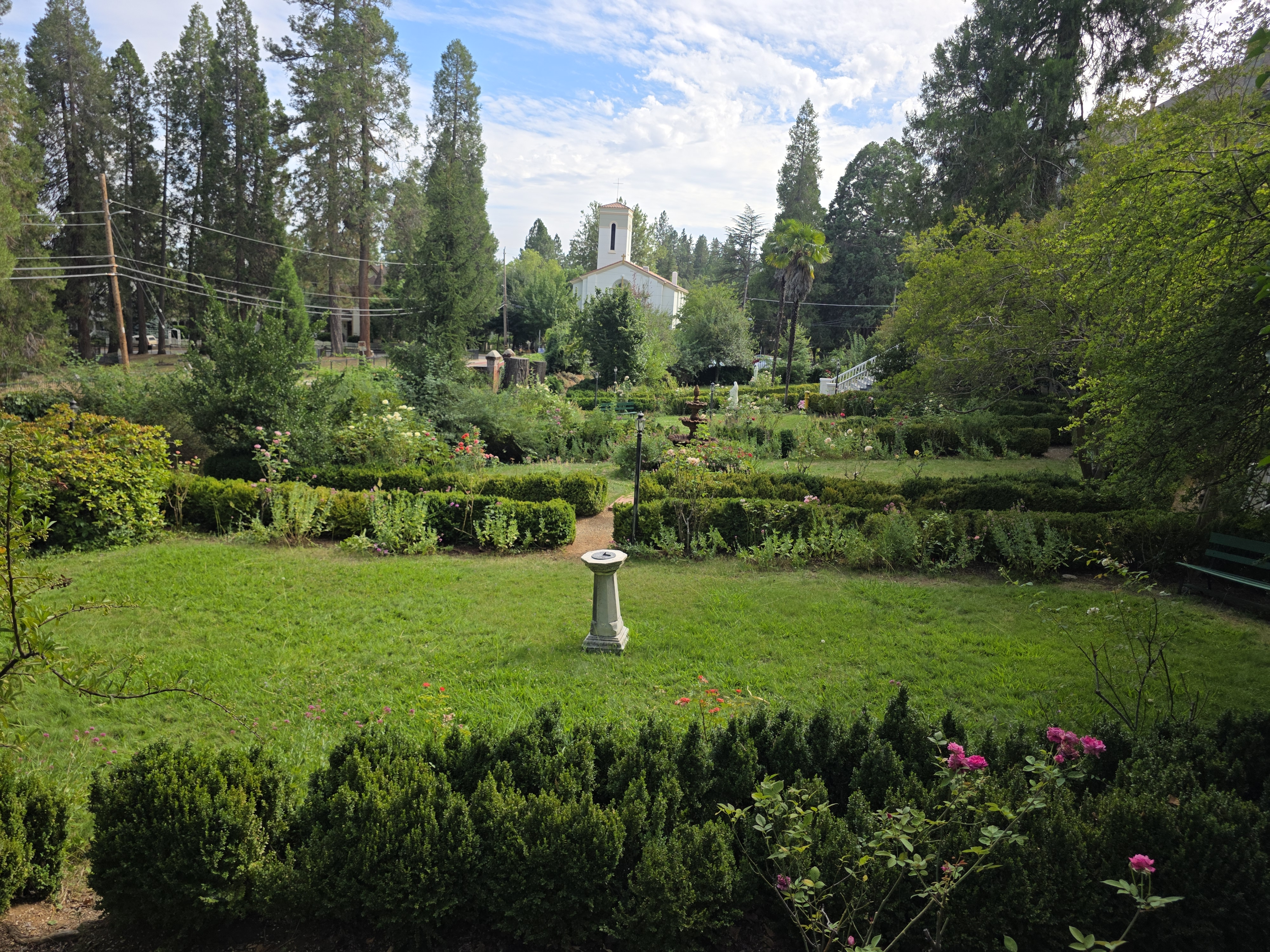
The Russell Rose Garden

The orphanage closed in 1932 and the facility was de-sanctified in 1968. The following year, in 1969, the Grass Valley Historic Preservation Committee began repair and preservation of the building and the Sisters' rose garden. The Foley Library for Historical Research in nearby Nevada City, California retains historical documents for Mount St. Mary's.

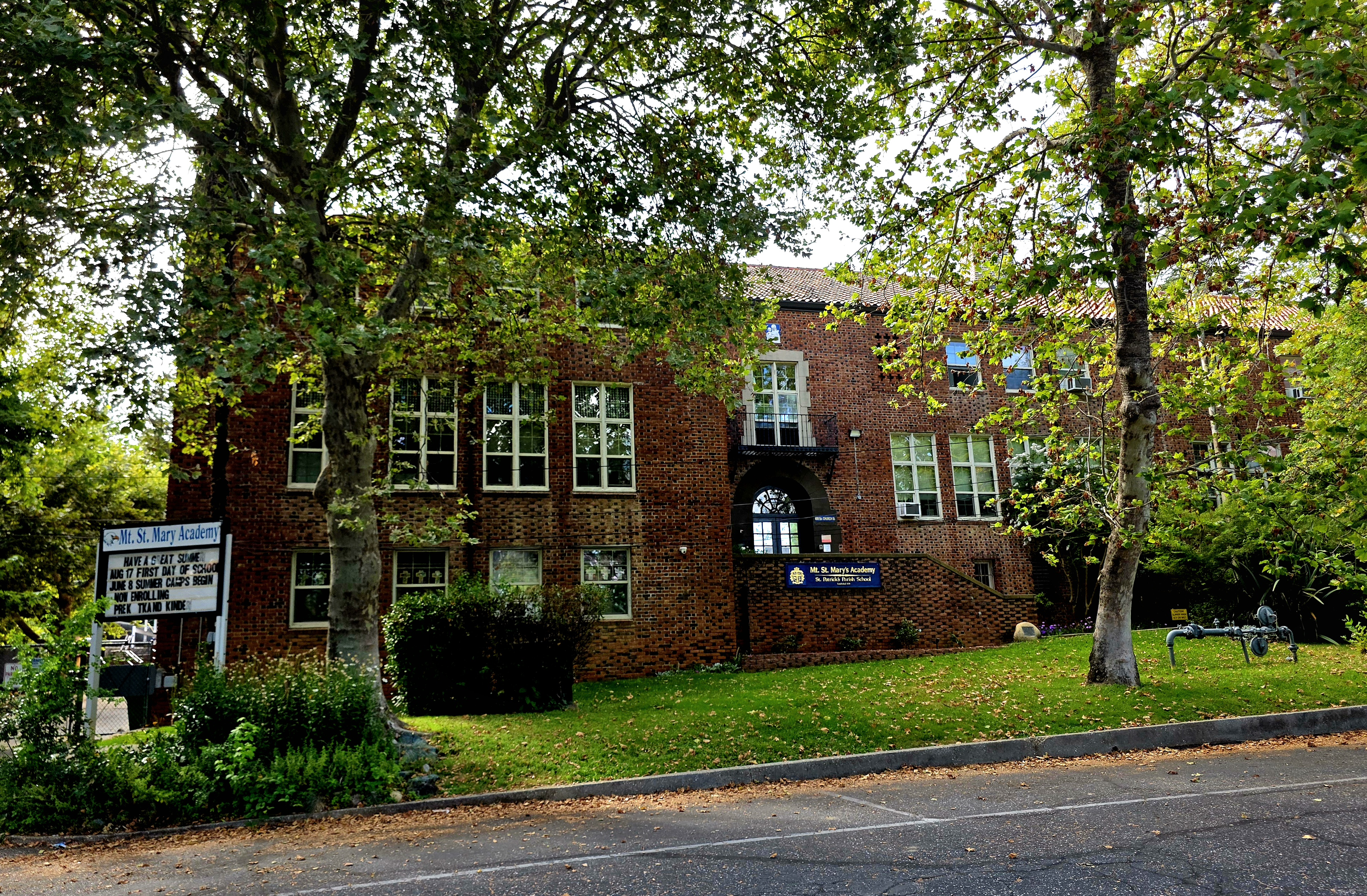
Mount Saint Mary's Academy building

Mount Saint Marys Academy is still running as a school.

=== Construction ===
The building is three stories tall, and was built at a cost of $19,856, including construction and interior furnishings.

- First floor - Construction: stone. Use: classrooms, dining room, kitchen, laundry, lavatory, store rooms.
- Second floor - Construction: brick. Use: chapel, classrooms, library, parlors.
- Third floor - Construction: brick. Use: dormitories, sleeping quarters, infirmary.

== Landmark designation ==
This Nevada County building is honored as on the National Register of Historic Places and as California Historical Landmark No. 855, registered in 1972-04-24. The plaque's inscription states:

Mount Saint Mary's Convent and Academy

Built by Reverend Thomas J. Dalton, the Sacred Heart Convent and Holy Angels Orphanage was dedicated May 2, 1865 by Bishop Eugene O'Connell. Under the Sisters of Mercy, it served from 1866 to 1932 as the first orphanage of the Northern Mines. It functioned as an academy from 1868 to 1965 and as a convent from 1866 to 1968.

The plaque was placed on the building on October 28, 1972, by the California Department of Parks and Recreation.

== See also ==
- National Register of Historic Places listings in Nevada County, California
- California Historical Landmarks in Nevada County
