= Sweetland, California =

Sweetland
- Former settlement
- Location in California
- Coordinates: 39°20′34.8″N 121°7′8.4″W
- Country: United States
- State: California
- County: Nevada County
- Established: 1850s
- Elevation: 1,857 ft (566 m)
- Time zone: UTC-8 (Pacific (PST))
  - Summer (DST): UTC-7 (PDT)

Sweetland is a former settlement in Nevada County, California. Located approximately 20 mi (32 km) east of Marysville, It is situated at an elevation of 1,857 ft (566 m) above sea level.

== History ==
The settlement was named after the Sweetland brothers, including former California State Assemblyman, Henry Pettit Sweetland, who settled here in 1850, and in 1852, ran a trading post in the area.

The Sweetland Mining District was established in 1850. Three years later, it was split into three mining districts, including North San Juan. Sweetland was notable for having the largest tail sluices.

Some of the larger mines included:

- Manzanita
- Sweetland Creek Mine
- Boss Mine

A post office was established in 1857 or 1858, but it closed in 1905. In its mining days, it had a population between 200-300 residents.
