= Aaron A. Sargent House =

Historic house in California, United States

- U.S. National Register of Historic Places
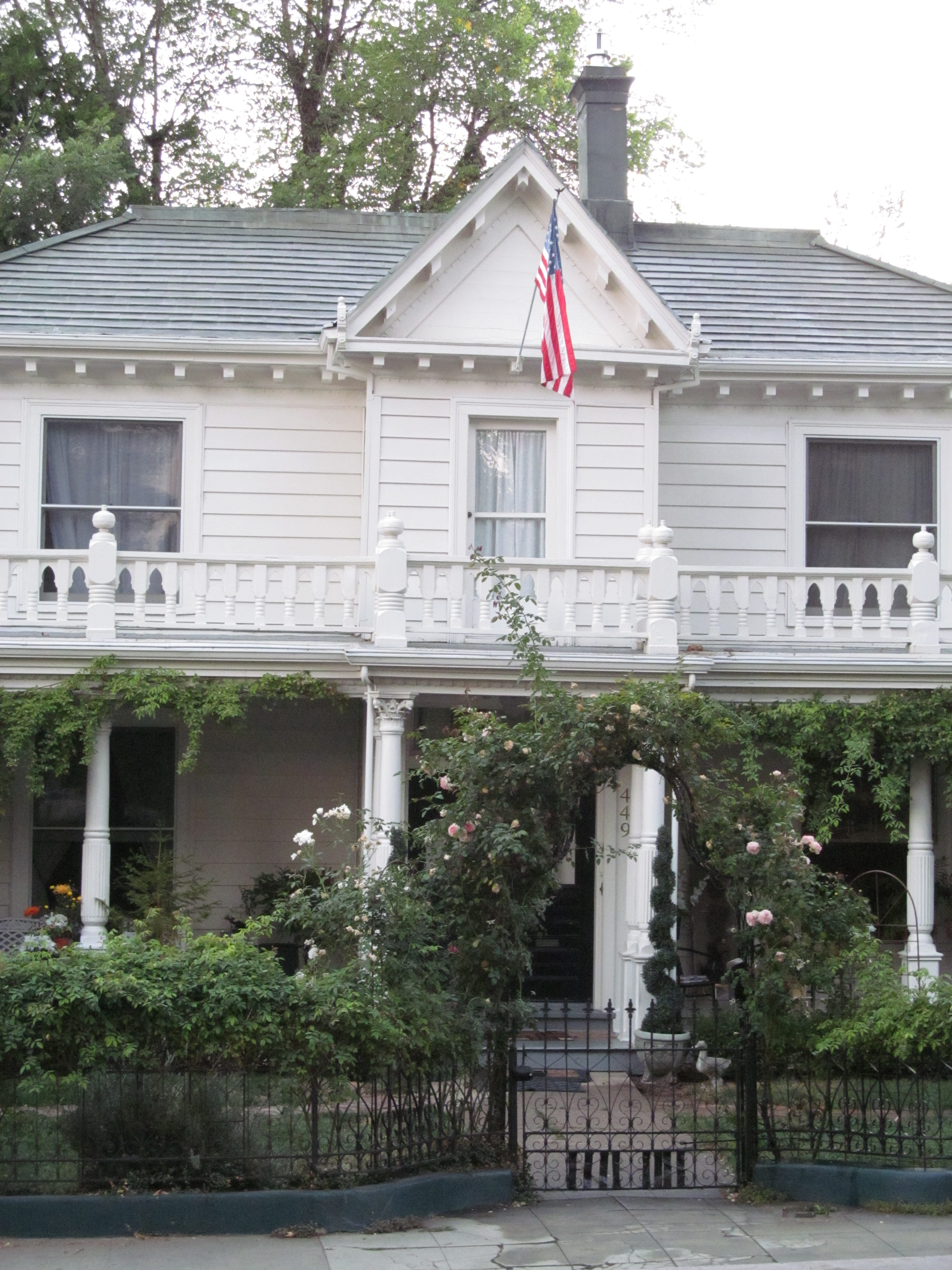
- The building in 2012

- Location within California Location within the United States
- Location: 449 Broad Street; Nevada City, California
- Coordinates: 39°15′49″N 121°1′14″W
- Built: prior to 1856
- Architectural style: Italianate Style Victorian
- NRHP reference No.: 80000825
- Added to NRHP: June 20, 1980

Aaron A. Sargent House is a historic building in Nevada City, California.

== History ==
Aaron A. Sargent House was built prior to 1856, and is located in Nevada City, California at 449 Broad Street. Its architecture and engineering were significant during the periods of 1850–1874, 1875–1899, 1900–1924. The single family home is an Italianate design.

When Aaron Augustus Sargent brought his new bride, Ellen Clark Sargent, to Nevada City on 23 October 1852, he provided a home near the intersection of Broad and Bennett Streets, an area later referred to as Nabob Hill. Over the years, the Sargents and other renovated the home.

At one time, it was owned by physician, Dr. Carl Muller. It is currently the Grandmere's Inn.

== Landmark ==
On 20 June 1980, this Nevada County building was designated as a landmark by the National Register of Historic Places.

== See also ==
- National Register of Historic Places listings in Nevada County, California
