= Henry Pettit Sweetland =

American politician

Henry Pettit Sweetland (July 29, 1827 - 1877) was an American politician, California pioneer, and town founder. He arrived in California in 1849. Sweetland and his brothers settled in the area that later bore their name, Sweetland, California, 1850; he ran a trading post in the settlement in 1852. He was a member of the California State Assembly in 1853. He married Augusta Ladd in 1855; they had no children. Sweetland died in California in 1877.
