= Ott's Assay Office =

- U.S. National Register of Historic Places
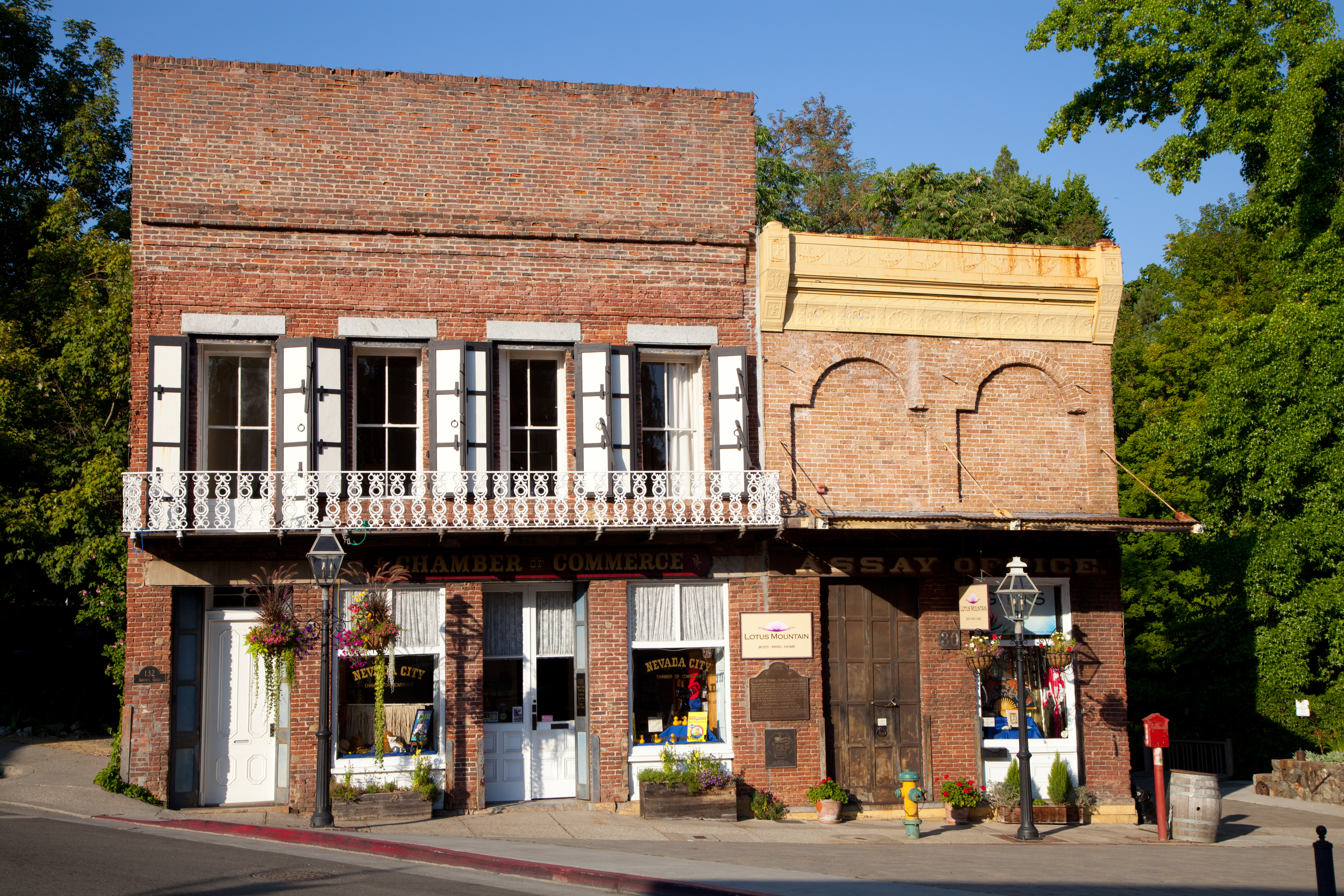

- Location within California Location within the United States
- Location: 130 Main St., Nevada City, California
- Coordinates: 39°15′47″N 121°0′56″W
- Area: 0.1 acres (0.040 ha)
- Built: 1863
- NRHP reference No.: 75000447
- Added to NRHP: April 14, 1975

Ott's Assay Office is a historic assay office located at 130 Main Street in Nevada City, California. The building was constructed in 1851 as a drug store; James J. Ott opened his assay office in the back of the store in 1857. In 1859, Ott assayed a sample of silver ore discovered in the Washoe Country; this ore marked the discovery of the Comstock Lode, and the resulting silver rush eventually led to Nevada's statehood and several advancements in mining technology. The silver rush also gave Ott a reputation as a quality assayer; he ran his office until his death in 1907, and his son continued the business until 1955.

The adjoining building, which shares a common wall and is often considered part of the same building, was built in 1855. It served as the offices of the South Yuba Canal Company, which was formed in 1851 to bring water to the gold mines north of Nevada City. The company owned the oldest mining ditches in California, and it was the first in the United States to provide water to gravel mining operations. By 1855, it had become California's largest ditch company.

The buildings were added to the National Register of Historic Places on April 14, 1975.
