= North San Juan, California =

North San Juan
- census-designated place
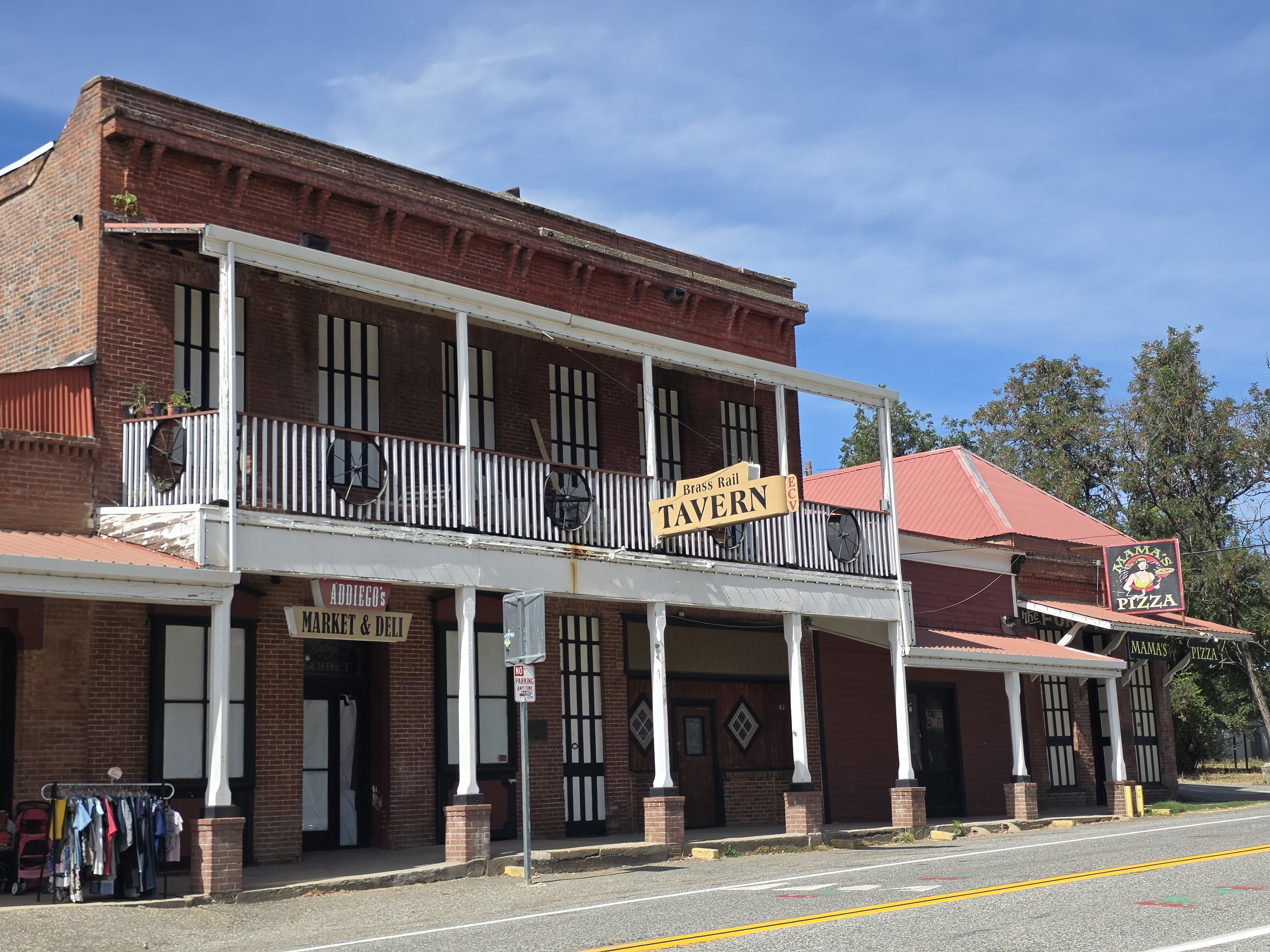
- Part of the North San Juan business district

- Location of North San Juan in California
- Coordinates: 39°22′17″N 121°06′26″W
- Country: United States
- State: California
- County: Nevada

Area
  - Total: 2.423 sq mi (6.275 km^{2})
  - Land: 2.423 sq mi (6.275 km^{2})
  - Water: 0 sq mi (0 km^{2}) 0%
- Elevation: 2,172 ft (662 m)

Population (2020)
  - Total: 245
  - Density: 101/sq mi (39.0/km^{2})
- Time zone: UTC-8 (Pacific (PST))
  - Summer (DST): UTC-7 (PDT)
- ZIP code: 95960
- Area code: 530
- GNIS feature ID: 2628766

North San Juan is a census-designated place in Nevada County, California, United States, along State Route 49 on the San Juan Ridge in Gold Country. The zip code is 95960. The population was 245 at the 2020 census.

== History ==
The community's beginnings date back to the California Gold Rush and it prospered during the era of hydraulic mining at nearby Malakoff Diggins State Historic Park from 1850 to 1884. Beginning in 1867, it was included on the route for the first long-distance telephone line, a historical landmark, between French Corral and French Lake.

The original name San Juan was bestowed by a veteran of the Mexican–American War who settled there in 1853 because he thought the site looked like San Juan de Ulúa near Veracruz.

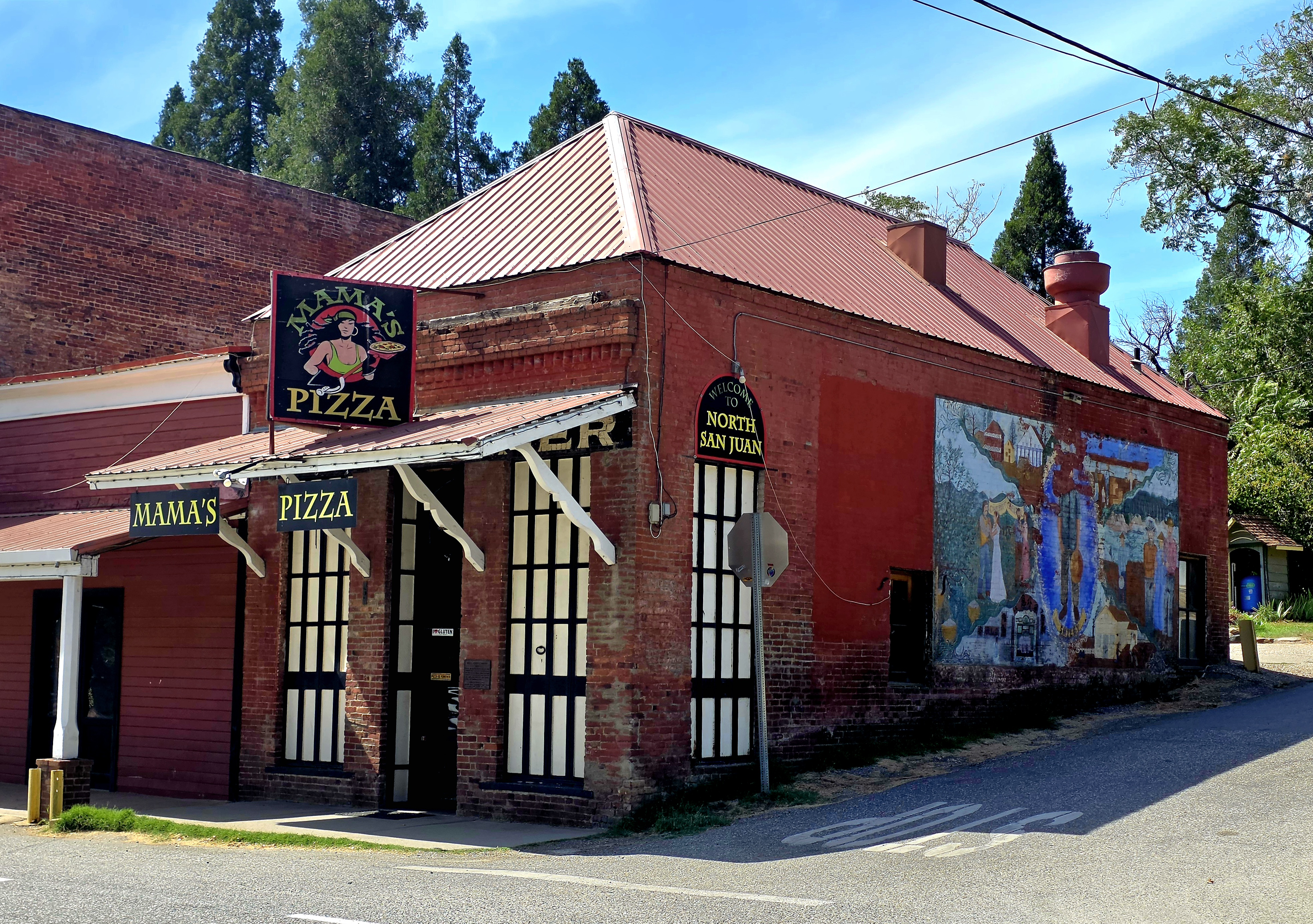
Wells Fargo and Company building, 1854

Wells Fargo and Company built an office in North San Juan in 1854 that was used to store gold and currency, and operated for six years. The building then became a clothing store, a Chinese laundry, a liquor store and is now a pizzeria.

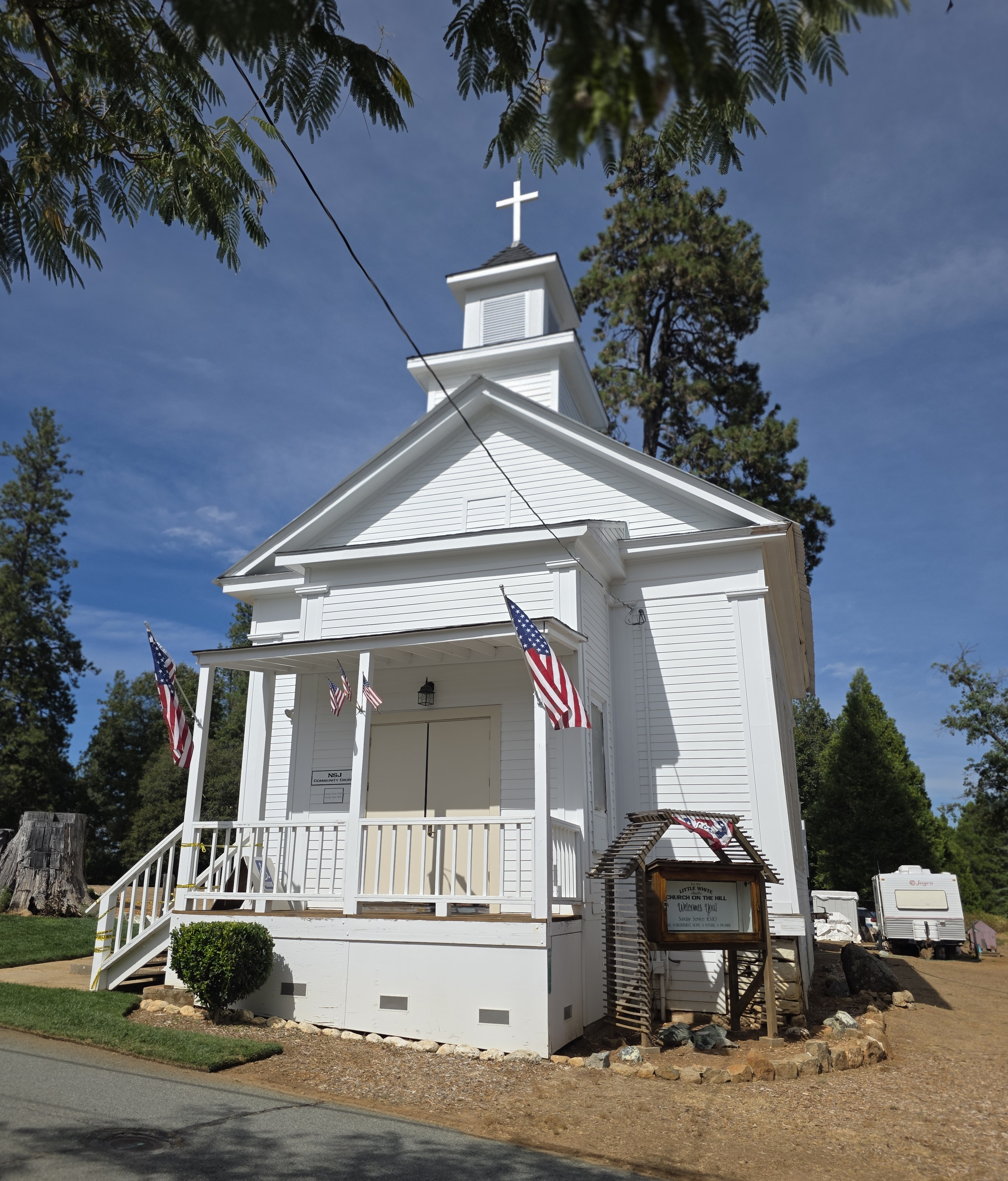
United Methodist Church North, built 1856

A United Methodist church was built in 1856, and as of 2026, has been in continuous operation.

When the post office opened in 1857, "North" was added to distinguish it from San Juan in San Benito County.

In 1880, the population was 675.

The community is also important to Welsh-American history, as the first eisteddfod in the State of California was organized by Thomas Gwallter Price, whose Bardic name was "Cuhelyn", and took place in North San Juan on July 4th, 1860.

== Geography ==
According to the United States Census Bureau, the CDP covers an area of 2.4 square miles (6.3 km^{2}), all of it land.

=== Climate ===
According to the Köppen Climate Classification system, North San Juan has a warm-summer Mediterranean climate, abbreviated "Csa" on climate maps.

== Demographics ==
The 2020 United States census reported that North San Juan had a population of 245. The population density was 101.1 inhabitants per square mile (39.0/km^{2}). The racial makeup of North San Juan was 202 (82.4%) White, 2 (0.8%) African American, 6 (2.4%) Native American, 6 (2.4%) Asian, 1 (0.4%) Pacific Islander, 3 (1.2%) from other races, and 25 (10.2%) from two or more races. Hispanic or Latino of any race were 12 persons (4.9%).

The whole population lived in households. There were 120 households, out of which 30 (25.0%) had children under the age of 18 living in them, 44 (36.7%) were married-couple households, 12 (10.0%) were cohabiting couple households, 29 (24.2%) had a female householder with no partner present, and 35 (29.2%) had a male householder with no partner present. 43 households (35.8%) were one person, and 15 (12.5%) were one person aged 65 or older. The average household size was 2.04. There were 68 families (56.7% of all households).

The age distribution was 37 people (15.1%) under the age of 18, 12 people (4.9%) aged 18 to 24, 66 people (26.9%) aged 25 to 44, 61 people (24.9%) aged 45 to 64, and 69 people (28.2%) who were 65 years of age or older. The median age was 47.6 years. There were 149 males and 96 females.

There were 141 housing units at an average density of 58.2 units per square mile (22.5 units/km^{2}), of which 120 (85.1%) were occupied. Of these, 101 (84.2%) were owner-occupied, and 19 (15.8%) were occupied by renters.

== Politics ==
In the state legislature, North San Juan is in the 1st senatorial district, represented by Republican Megan Dahle, and the 1st Assembly district, represented by Republican Heather Hadwick.

Federally, North San Juan is in California's 3rd congressional district, represented by Independent Kevin Kiley.

== Education ==
It is in the Twin Ridges Elementary School District and the Nevada Joint Union High School District.

== See also ==
- Mining communities of the California Gold Rush
