= Meadow Lake Petroglyphs =

Archaeological site in California, United States

- U.S. National Register of Historic Places
- Nearest city: French Lake, California
- NRHP reference No.: 71000169
- Added to NRHP: May 6, 1971

The Meadow Lake Petroglyphs (also known as 4-Nev-3) are located in a restricted area by French Lake, California in the Tahoe National Forest. Attributed to the Martis people, they are listed on the National Register of Historic Places. The prehistoric rock art is significant for the period of 1499 BC to 1000 AD.
