= Martis people =

Martis
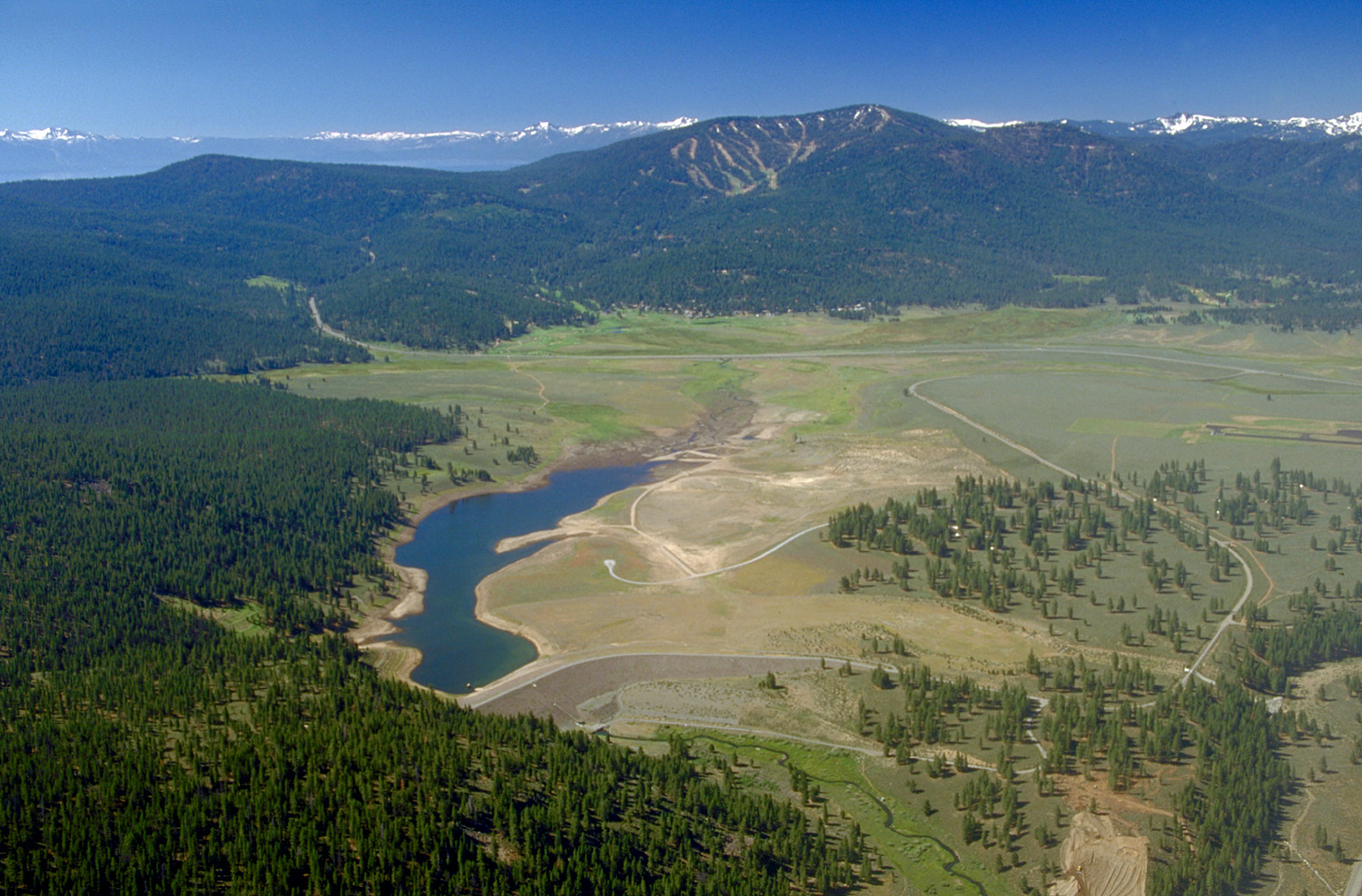
- Martis Creek Lake and Dam at the southern end of Nevada County near Truckee, California.

Regions with significant populations
- United States (California and Nevada)

Related ethnic groups
- Maidu, possibly Washoe

Martis is the name given by scientists to the group of Native Americans who lived in Northern California on both the eastern and western sides of the Sierra Nevada. The Martis complex lasted from 2000 BCE to 500 CE, during the Middle Archaic era. Evidence of Martis habitation has been found from Carson River and Reno, Nevada in the east to Auburn, California and Oroville, California in the west. The Martis name refers to the geographic region of Martis Creek which spans Nevada County, California and Placer County, California.

== Culture ==
Martis traveled to lower elevations in the winter and higher elevations in the summer in loose-knit groups. They lived in base camps on valley margins, often near hot springs. In the winter, they lived in pit houses with hearths, pit caches, and occasionally burials. Extended families are believed to have lived together. Summer camps were often located near springs or creeks.

They shared certain traits which included making stone tools from basalt, using pestles and mortars, and hunting with atlatls and spears. Martis engaged in a hunter-gatherer economic system. Martis people processed seeds and hunted big game, such as bighorn sheep, pronghorn antelope, deer, bison, and elk.

== Descendants ==
Archaeologist M.J. Moratto states that the Martis were not related to the Washoe, but may have been linked with the Maidu. However, other scholars (Robert G. Elston and Catherine S. Fowler) suggest that the Martis complex overlaps culturally and geographically with the Kings Beach complex of ancestral Washoe people.

== Sites ==
The Meadow Lake Petroglyphs, attributed to the Martis, are a national historical landmark. Another notable Martis archaeological site includes the Grouse Lakes Area of Nevada County, called the Martis Archaeological Complex, and cataloged as style 7 rock art.

Others sites include Truckee Meadows–Steamboat Hot Springs, Bordertown, and Hallelujah Junction.

== See also ==
- Indigenous peoples of California
