= Kruger House (Truckee, California) =

Historic house in California, United States

- U.S. National Register of Historic Places
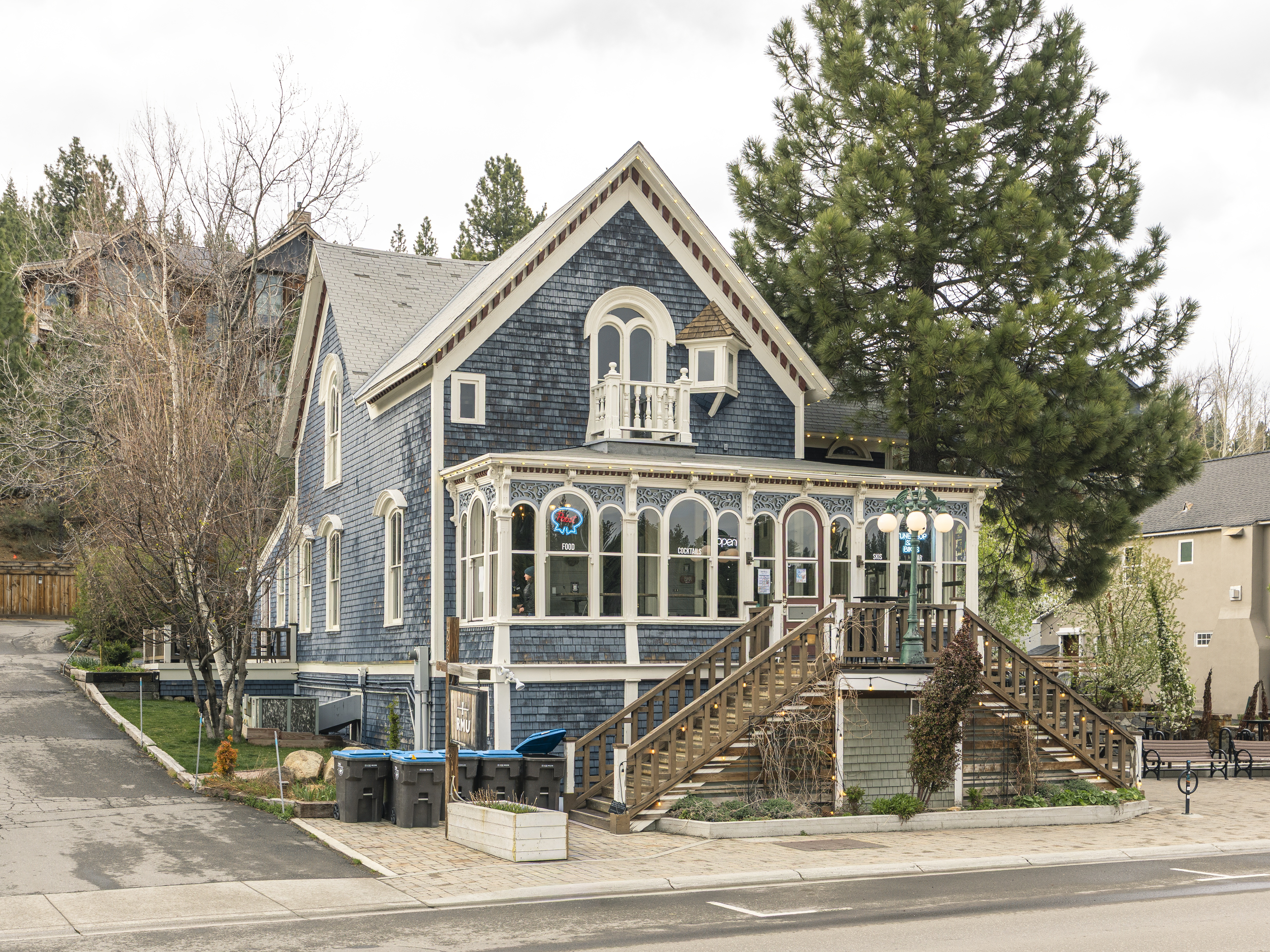
- Location: 10292 Donner Pass Rd., Truckee, California
- Coordinates: 39°19′35″N 120°11′18″W
- Area: 0.2 acres (0.081 ha)
- Built: 1874
- Architectural style: Queen Anne Eastlake Style-Victorian
- NRHP reference No.: 82002220
- Added to NRHP: June 17, 1982

The Kruger House (or C.B. White House) is a historic building located at 10292 Donner Pass Road, in Truckee, Nevada County, northern California.

The mansion was built in 1873–1874 by W. H. Kruger, who was then a partner in the Truckee Lumber Company. It was originally designed as a single-family residence, in the Queen Anne Eastlake Victorian style. It served as a hotel in the early 20th century.

The restored building currently houses a restaurant and specialty store, in the Brickelltown neighborhood west of downtown Truckee. In 1982 it was registered with the California Office of Historic Preservation, and added to the National Register of Historic Places.

== History ==
=== Kruger family ===
The mansion was built by William Henry Kruger for his wife and eventually six children. It is reported that Mr. Kruger 'imported' fourteen Austrian craftsmen for the project. Henry Kruger was born in Germany on April 9, 1830, and came to America in 1852. While engaged in mining, mercantile pursuits, and the sawmill business, he lived in Grass Valley, Dutch Flat, and finally, Truckee, where he became half-owner of the very large and successful Truckee Lumber Company with E. J. Brickell (the namesake of that part of town). His partnership with Mr. Brickell involved one of the most efficient and progressive mills in the area, in addition to a supply house offering the latest and best materials available for construction, decorating, and furnishing for the most discriminating customers.

Henry Kruger died June 27, 1891, leaving his fortune, which by then had grown to an estimated million 1891 dollars, to his wife and children. Mary Adella Richardson Kruger lived until the age of 93, dying on November 3, 1940. Nearly all of Kruger's surviving grand, great-grand, and great-great-grandchildren are living in California today.

=== White family ===
Charles Bernard White, a Bank of America executive and prominent Truckee citizen, purchased the home in November 1904 for his wife Belle and infant son C. B. White, Junior. Belle White, in her youth, was a Sacramento Beauty Queen, and also a noted concert pianist, offering instruction in their home for many decades. The Truckee old-timers still speak of the massive piano and other exquisite furnishings that adorned the 'White House.' He was later deeply involved in the Lincoln Highway through the Truckee Project. Barney White Jr. later attended the University of California, Berkeley, becoming a well-regarded Sacramento civil engineer, and was a long-time leader of the Sacramento Banjo-Players' Association.

It was during the early 1900s that the White family opened their home to help alleviate the local lodging shortage: from 1912 to the late twenties, the 'White House Hotel' catered to the first automobile traffic over Donner Pass Summit, which included many notable early Lake Tahoe residents and preservationists; for instance D. L. Bliss, his and numerous signatures of other wealthy and famous can be found in the original White House Hotel Register, beginning July 1912. After the late 1920s, the home returned to use as a single-family residence. It eventually suffered a period of vacancy and deterioration through the mid-20th century.

=== Krakowsky Restoration ===
Under the direction of Zena Krakowsky, a long-time Truckee resident and progressive businessperson, the mansion underwent an extensive and painstakingly precise seven-year rehabilitation, with attention being paid to every detail, including closely matching the Axminster carpet, wallpaper to reflect the originals, and custom-mixed paints to tie the interior architecture together. All parts were refurbished, including molding, fretwork, and stained-glass windows.

During the project, the building was transparently upgraded to commercial code in preparation for Ms. Krakowsky's opening of the building to the public in 1980 as an antique shop and fine-dining establishment. In 1982, based on the quality of rehabilitation and preservation, the Kruger-White House received the honor of being the first property in the area to be listed on the National Register of Historic Places. On 17 June 1982, it was registered with the California Office of Historic Preservation and was added to the National Register of Historic Places (#82002220). She operated businesses in the Kruger-White House from 1973 to 1995.

After the home was rehabilitated, the original 'White House Hotel Sign,' the hotel register (July 1912—forward), and other historic items discovered in the basement during rehabilitation were donated to the Truckee-Donner Historical Society.

In 2015 Tanya Thayer and Aaron Bigelow purchased the CB White House. The White House was in poor condition as was the historic adjacent building the old Carriage House. After decades of little maintenance and neglect, the buildings had begun to rot and collapse. With experience in historic building repair, refurbishment, and restoration of pre-1900 built structures, Aaron Bigelow of Bigelow Construction began the challenging task of saving this piece of Truckee History. The goal was to restore as much as could be restored to the original. Using old photographs and with the help of the Truckee Historic Society Bigelow/Thayer began the task. In the Town of Truckee, the building is zoned and categorized as one of important historic structures in the Town. It is the oldest still standing original location mansion/home, and one of the least modified structures from the original in the Town of Truckee. The Town of Truckee is now an incorporated area with a Town Council and a Historic Preservation Advisory Committee ( HPAC ) that offers advice and opinions on proposed changes and restoration methods. This began in 1993 with the Town Incorporation and the advent of the HPAC board. Before this most buildings of historical value had no protections and many were snatched up by developers and heavily modified if not completely demolished to build something in its place. The White House narrowly survived this fate and now sits with protections. However, those protections as well-intentioned as they may be, come with variations of opinions and advisory boards that do not always agree with the ultimate goal and efforts in preservation methods. After a few years of planning, meetings, negotiating, and diligence, the project was given the green light to go. With the benefit of modern construction materials and practices, the building was restored - while still keeping with the original architecture moldings and trim details to hide its inner skeleton of modern construction materials.

Regardless of the investment, no expense was spared in making sure the historic home was refurbished the right way and it would last for another 140 years. The Bigelow/Thayer goal was not to invest and walk away with monetary gains - but rather to purchase and steward the historic structure for generations to come to enjoy this very rare and very quickly disappearing piece of old Truckee History. One cannot walk by without stopping and looking at the White House for a moment or two - and think back to the time when she was a young home and a centerpiece of a booming lumber, ice, and railroad town. Imagine the era with hard-working men and women in this Alpine frontier. Horse and buggy was the mode of travel, and the telegraph was the era's only way to hear of the outside world's events. How many things in history the Historic structure has lived through. Many generations of events and change. To stand and think of this is truly humbling and a bit romantic. The Bigelow/Thayer team is very pleased to be blessed with the opportunity to step up and make this small investment into a vital part of Truckee's and California's historical preservation. We hope that anyone who has a chance to stop by and see this amazing part of living history will take a moment and walk around the property and buildings and imagine with us a time long gone but not forgotten.

== See also ==
- National Register of Historic Places listings in Nevada County, California
- Victorian architecture in California
