= Commercial Row–Brickelltown Historic District =

Historic district in California, United States

- U.S. National Register of Historic Places
- U.S. Historic district
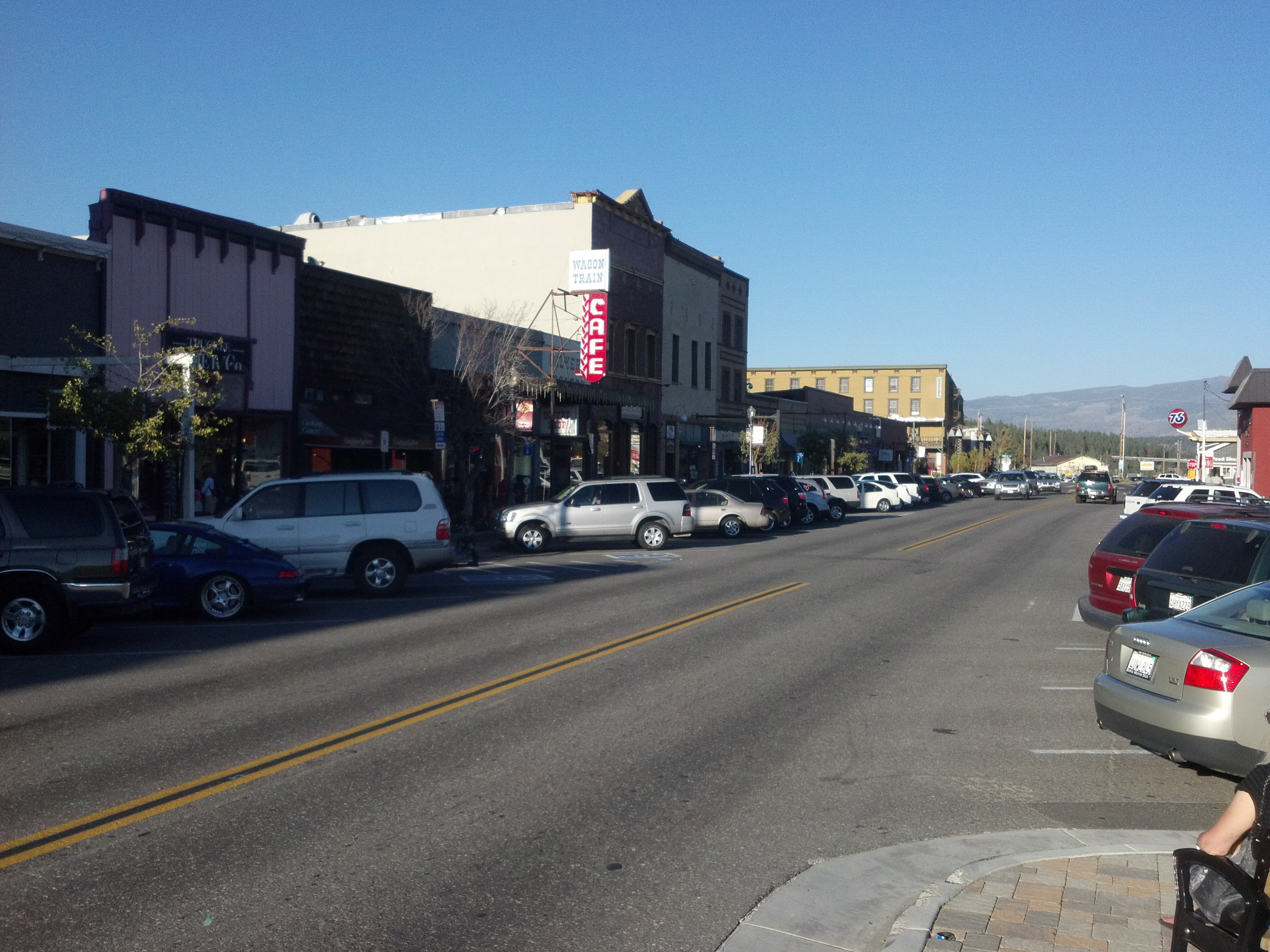

- Location within California Location within the United States
- Location: Roughly the N. side of Donner Pass Rd. from Bridge St. westwards approx. 1,700 ft., Truckee, California
- Coordinates: 39°19′39″N 120°11′12″W
- Area: 10 acres (4.0 ha)
- Built: 1870
- NRHP reference No.: 09000803
- Added to NRHP: October 8, 2009

The Commercial Row–Brickelltown Historic District is a historic district in downtown Truckee, California. Developed from 1870 to 1930, the district includes the significant parts of Truckee's early commercial district. Due to several major fires, the district had several distinct construction and rebuilding periods; the fires also destroyed several significant buildings, including the stagecoach station which established the site of the city's downtown. To protect them from fires, most of the surviving commercial buildings were built with stone or brick. Once the Central Pacific Railroad was completed through Truckee in 1869, it became one of the city's main economic drivers; the Commercial Row district's businesses mainly catered to workers and travelers on the railroad. The Brickelltown district, meanwhile, housed and served workers in Truckee's other main industry, lumber. In the twentieth century, both industries declined due to economic shifts and the Great Depression; the city, and Commercial Row in particular, instead built a tourist economy on visitors to the region's recreational activities.

The district was added to the National Register of Historic Places on October 8, 2009.
