= Davis Mill (Nevada City, California) =

- U.S. National Register of Historic Places
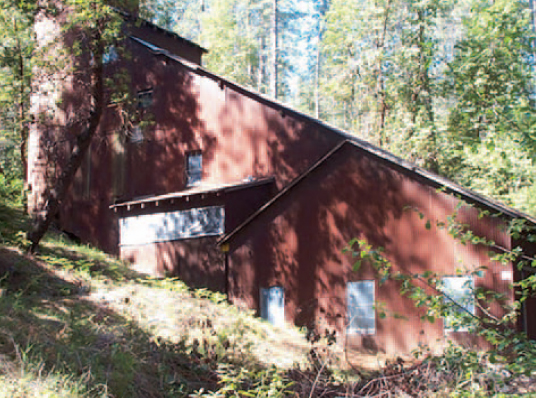
- Davis Mill

- Location within California Location within the United States
- Nearest city: Nevada City, California
- Coordinates: 39°17′26″N 120°59′18″W
- Area: 1 acre (0.40 ha)
- NRHP reference No.: 10000157
- Added to NRHP: April 1, 2010

The Davis Mill is a historic stamp mill located off of North Bloomfield Road northeast of Nevada City, California. The mill served the Randolph Mine, a small gold mine run by the Davis family, from 1915 to 1940.

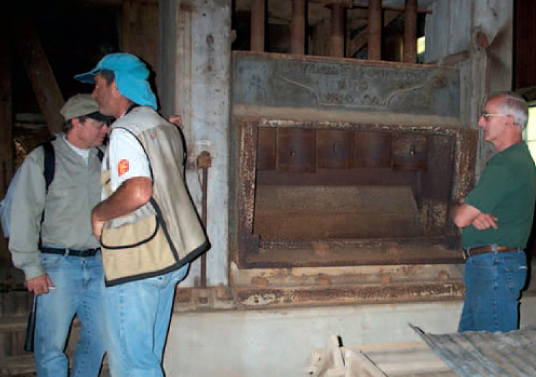
Davis Mill interior. showing the five stamp mill

It included the standard machinery of an early 20th century stamp mill, which consisted of a stamp battery, a rock crusher, an ore bin, an amalgamation table, concentrators, and a retort room. These parts were enclosed in a multi-story metal structure. The components and layout of the mill are well-preserved, providing an example of how miners processed ore in a stamp mill.

== History ==
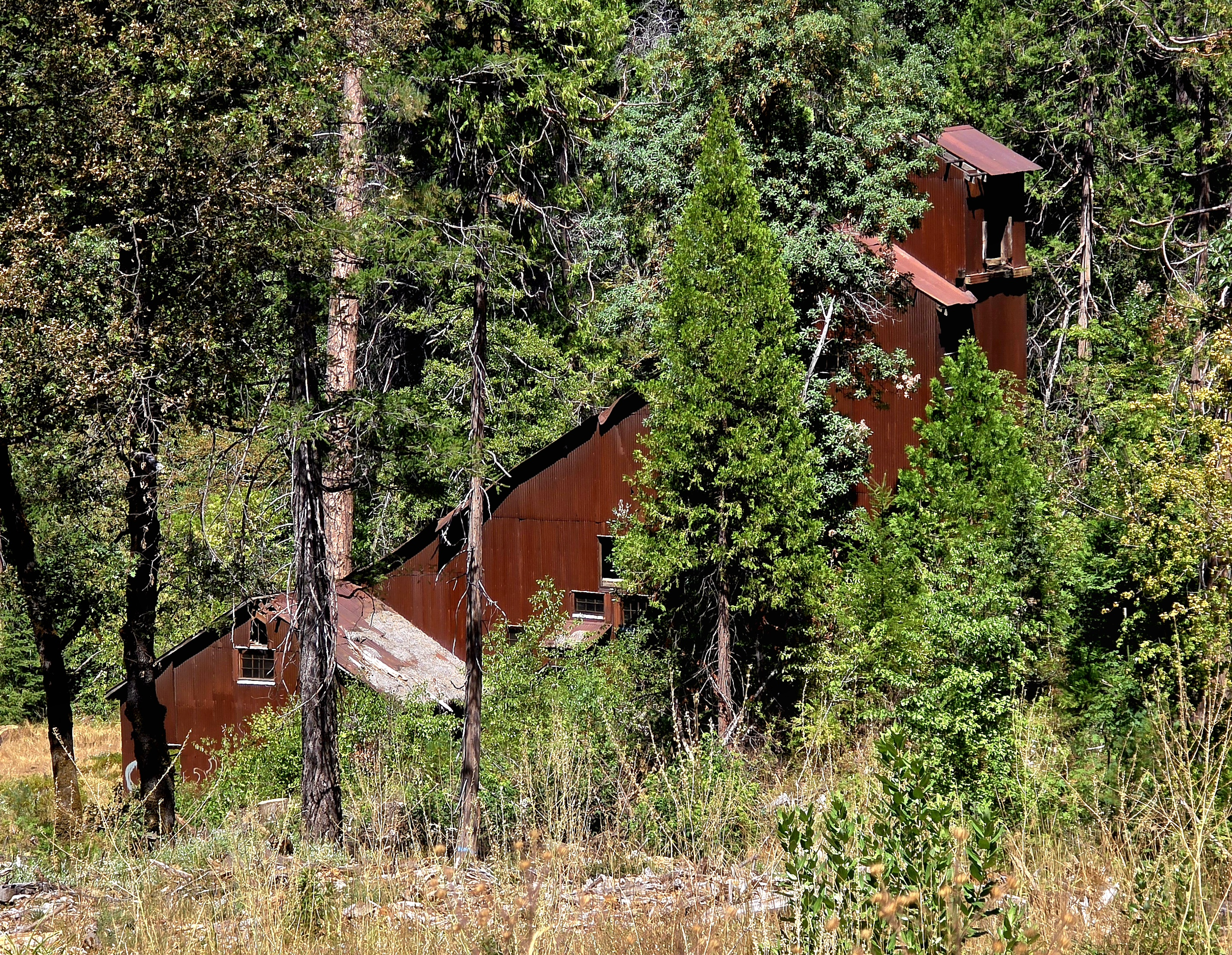
Davis Mill in 2026

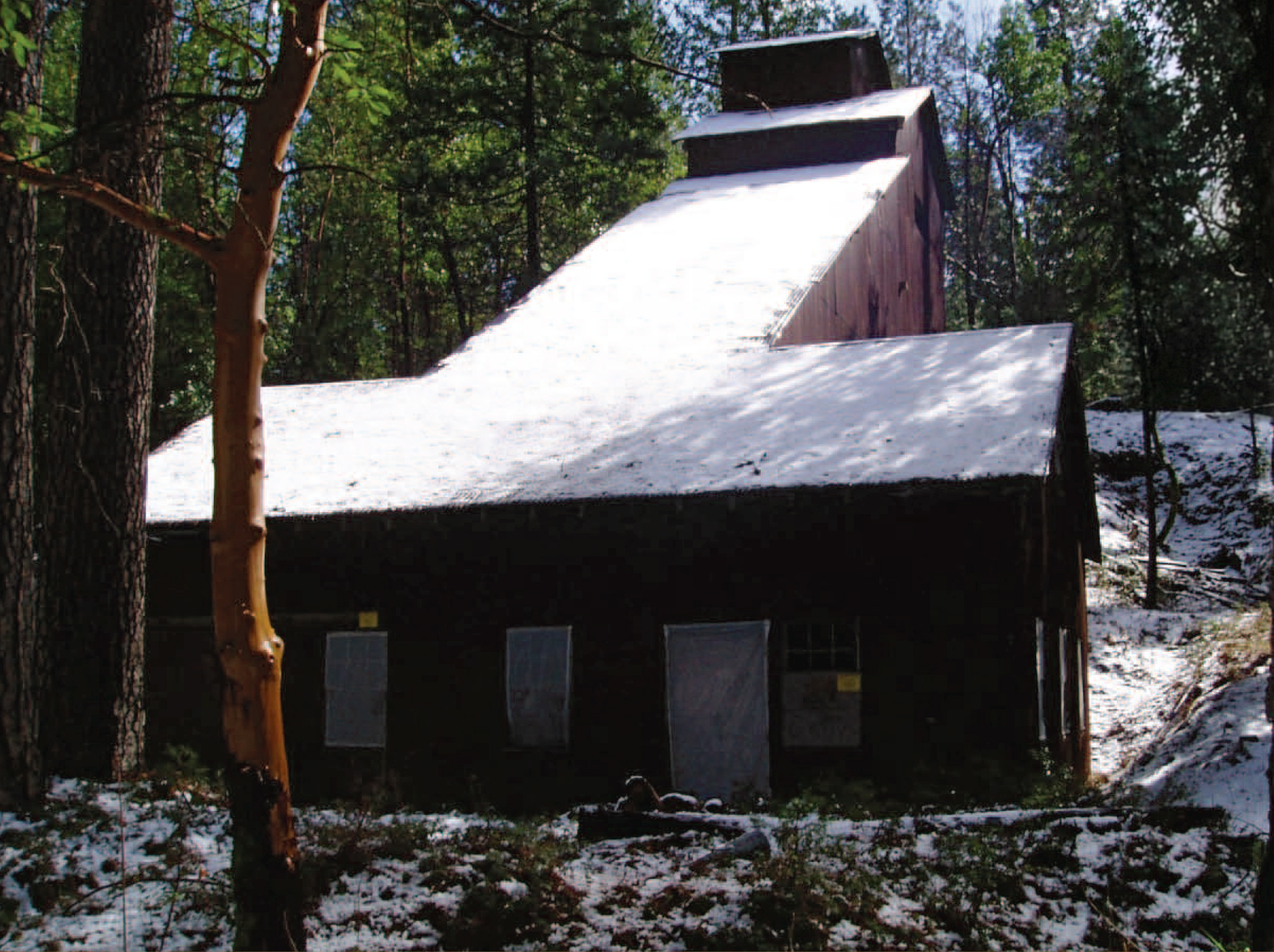
The Davis Mill with snow on the roof

Construction of the mill facility took place from 1915 to 1920, and was intended to serve the Randolph Mine. The Davis family owned both businesses, and that family included Eliza Davis and her three sons, Harry, Arthur and William Davis.. The period of greatest activity was into the early 1920s, and the mine was then leased to the Western Merger Mine Company, which ran it until 1931, giving it back to the Davis family during the Great Depression.. Due to adverse economic conditions, the family was unable to return the mine to profitability. Harry Davis appears to have operated the mill sporadically during the 1930s and perhaps into the early 1940s, when it shut down. He was processing ore for other local small mines. He lived on the mill site with his mother and his wife. Their house and other buildings that were part of the mining operation are also on the site..

The Bureau of Land Management (BLM) has described the mill as "remarkably well-preserved" and "a testament to the work of a small family-run mining operation.".

In 2003, the BLM tested samples of the mill tailings, the waste material from processing the gold ore, and discovered high levels of lead, mercury and arsenic. About 6,400 cubic yards of this toxic waste material was excavated and taken to an approved disposal facility.

The mill was added to the National Register of Historic Places on April 1, 2010. In 2011, drainage around the mill was upgraded to help stabilize the structure. As of 2026, it is not currently accessible to the public.
