= North Columbia, California =

Unincorporated community in California, United States

North Columbia
- Unincorporated community
- Location within the state of California North Columbia (the United States)
- Coordinates: 39°22′22″N 120°59′14″W
- Country: United States
- State: California
- County: Nevada
- Elevation: 3,015 ft (919 m)
- Time zone: UTC-8 (Pacific (PST))
  - Summer (DST): UTC-7 (PDT)

North Columbia was a California Gold Rush town on the San Juan Ridge in Nevada County, California. Originally known as Columbia, Columbia Hill, or The Hill because of its proximity to Columbia Hill, it started as a gold miners' camp around 1851. When a Post Office was established on May 29, 1860, the word "North" was added in order to differentiate the settlement from Columbia, California, another gold rush town in Tuolumne County, California.

In 1878, when miners discovered that the Pliocene gravel bed upon which the town was built contained rich gold deposits, North Columbia was moved to its present location. But with the eventual curtailment of hydraulic mining, miners moved away. The post office closed in 1931.

Eventually, North Columbia became an unincorporated part of Nevada City, California.

== Historic landmarks ==
The Columbia Hill Schoolhouse still stands, though it has been converted into a cultural center, hosting events such as the North Columbia Folk Festival and the Sierra Storytelling Festival. It was registered as a historical landmark in 1971.

Foote's Crossing Road, a National Historic Place, links North Columbia to Alleghany.
