= French Corral, California =

Unincorporated community in California, United States

French Corral
- Unincorporated community
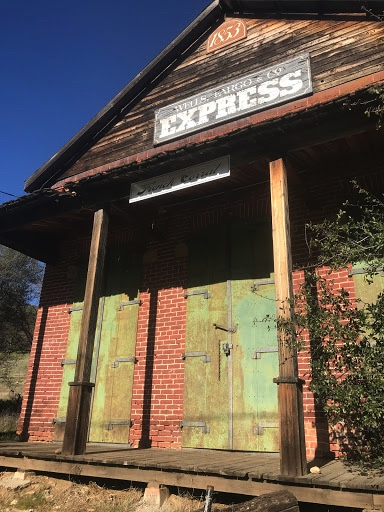
- An old Wells Fargo Bank building in French Corral

- Location of French Corral in California
- Coordinates: 39°18′22″N 121°09′41″W
- Country: United States
- State: California
- County: Nevada
- Elevation: 1,532 ft (467 m)
- Time zone: UTC-8 (Pacific (PST))
  - Summer (DST): UTC-7 (PDT)
- Area code: 530

French Corral is an unincorporated community approximately five miles west of California State Highway 49 in Nevada County, California, United States.

It was one of the first of several historic California gold rush mining camps along the San Juan Ridge. The name was literal as the town grew around a mule corral built by the first settler in the area, a Frenchman, in 1849. It had a post office during the period of 1859 through 1945.

Few original structures remain besides an old Wells Fargo Bank building.

== Location ==
Based on roads and trails used during its time, French Corral was located between the small towns of Rough & Ready and North San Juan. On a present-day map, French Corral is located in the extreme northwest corner of Nevada County, California. Originally, French Corral was part of the nearby Bridgeport Township, the third locality in the county in terms of population and wealth during the mining years.

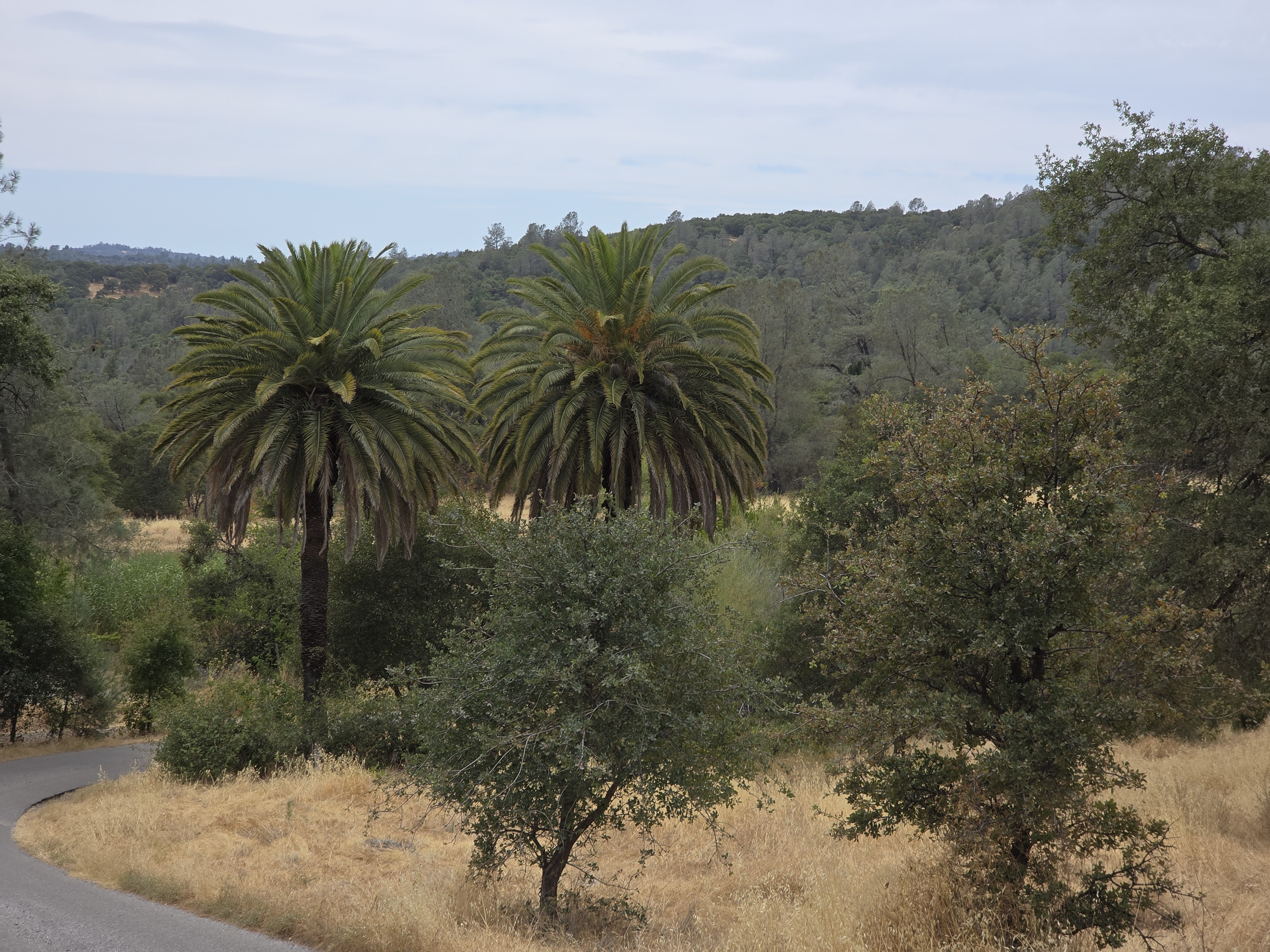
Palm trees in French Corral, California

French Corral is part of a thermal belt that runs from the town site to the Bear River along the lower foothills of the western part of Nevada County. This allowed citrus crops to be successfully grown in the area from the 1870s well into the 1920s. Due to the accommodating soil and climate, early French settlers of the area planted vineyards and produced local wines.

== Founding ==
French Corral's name is self-descriptive in that in 1849 a Frenchman living on Frenchman's Bar on the Yuba River built a mule corral on the site that would later become the town. At about the same time, a Mr. Galloway established a trading post near by. Originally in a tent, it was upgraded to a log building. In 1851 the town showed up as Frenchmans Couill on a Milleson & Adams map, and by 1857 the town was shown as French Corral on Goddard's map. At some point during this timeframe, the locals tried to rename the town Carrolton, but the new name never stuck and it remained French Corral.

Mining and, to a lesser extent, agriculture both drove the boom in French Corral. By the 1850s it was an important town between the growing gold-rush hubs of Grass Valley and Nevada City, and rural North San Juan.

== History ==
The town thrived for several decades, by the early 1850s French Corral had a population of 300-400 residents. In 1852 a Post Office was established and by 1859 a horse express to the nearby town of North San Juan was introduced. Supported by the continuing mining opportunities, by the 1880s there were two hotels, one store, a saloon, a bakery, four blacksmiths, two carpenters, a physician, and many homes in French Corral. Helping to continue the vibrancy of the town was a stage line from North San Juan to Marysville in Yuba County that routed through French Corral.

By mid 1853 the town boasted approximately 70 homes. Unfortunately, within a short time fire destroyed 50 of them. Fire would continue to plague the town with destruction and rebuilding becoming a regular part of life for the residents.

Beginning in 1855, the male citizens of French Corral consistently cast votes in national and state elections and volunteered for the Bridgeport Guards, a protective organization. During the Civil War, the town contributed $300 to the “sanitary fund” for the Union Army.

Founded, and sustained to a great extent by individuals from France or of French ancestry, the town retained a Gallic influence, becoming a major grape-growing region in Nevada County. Many citizens maintained contact with their mother country. For example, in 1870, the town collected and donated $192 to the French victims of the Franco-Prussian War.

As was unfortunately commonplace in the surrounding mining towns, the residents of French Corral drove out the local Chinese residents and burned down many of their homes in 1867. A trial later determined that one individual was the “instigator,” but most accomplices went unpunished.

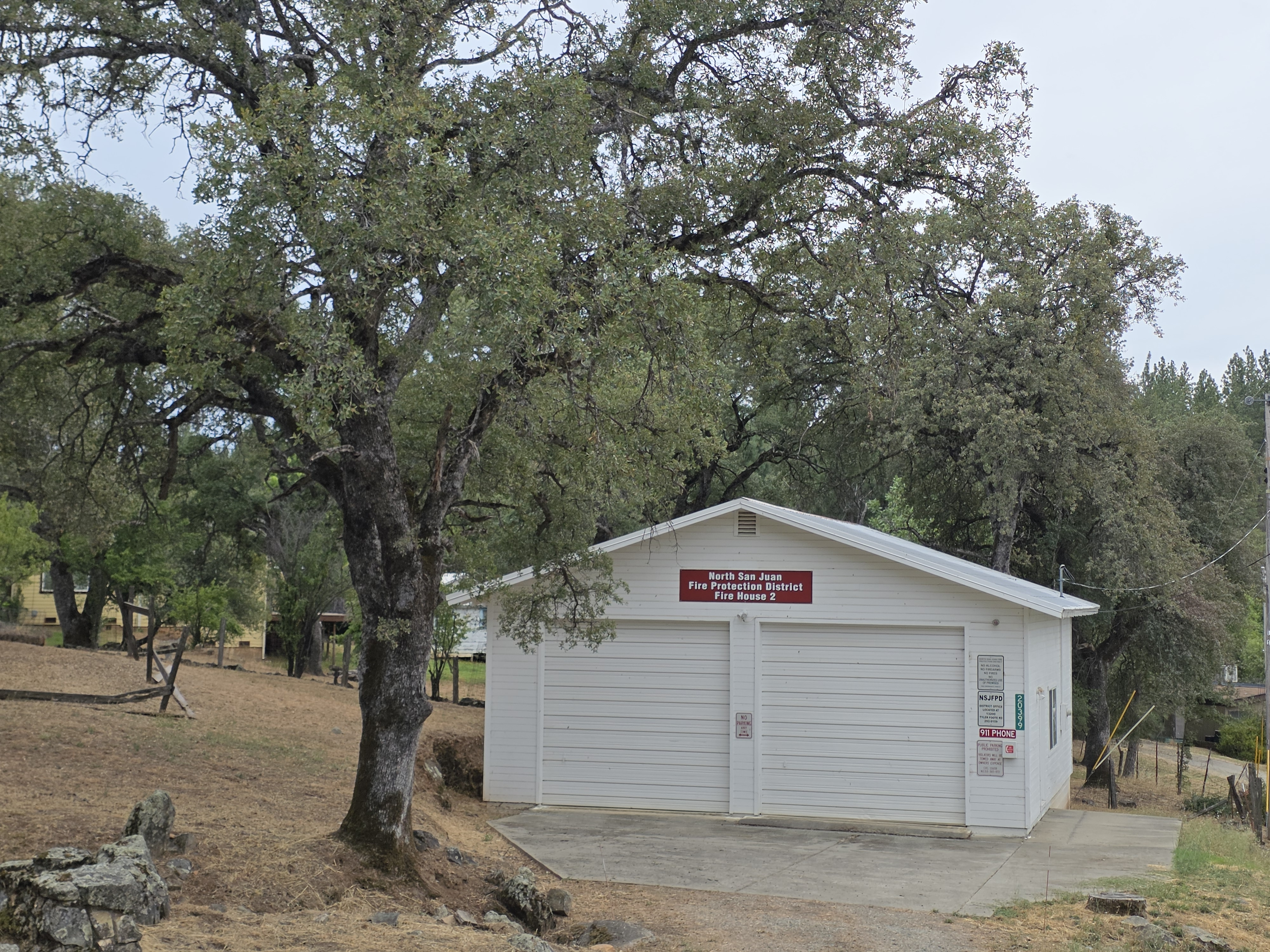
Fire station in French Corral, California

== Mining ==
French Corral's current condition contradicts its prolific past. Having "resounded to the tread of the prospector," the town enjoyed both a placer boom and a hydraulic mining boom. The area existed as a successful mining region from 1849 well into the 1900s.

Ravine mining began in the area in 1849, with surface diggings discovered around 1851. More sophisticated mining practices started in early 1852, with the building of a ditch from Shady Creek by the Messrs, Twist, Wadsworth, Williams, Spurry, and the Eddy brothers. Another Shady Creek ditch was built in 1853, brought in by the Grizzly Water Company and principally owned by Charles Marsh and W.M. Stewart. Several fires damaged the facilities, but profitable mining continued, with more ditches and deeper tunnels being built throughout the 1850s.

The gold mined in the 1850s in the French Corral area was estimated in the millions of dollars.

As hydraulic mining took over, several large mines were established near French Corral, including the Manzanita Mine operated by the Milton Company. By 1880, the company had 160 men on the payroll. Several men became wealthy through these mining practices. Those men included A.H. Eddy, the eventual owner of the National Exchange Hotel in Nevada City, W.G. Fenton, M.L. Marsh, and Jean Villian.

Hydraulic mining lasted until the 1884 prohibition of discharging mining debris into the Yuba River. In 1894, however, the U.S. Debris Commission granted limited hydraulic mining to the French Corral region.

Interestingly, diamonds of notable size and brilliance were also found in French Corral. It was said that "bigger and better diamonds have been found at French Corral, in Nevada County, than in any other place in California."

== First Long-Distance Phone Line ==
See First long-distance telephone line

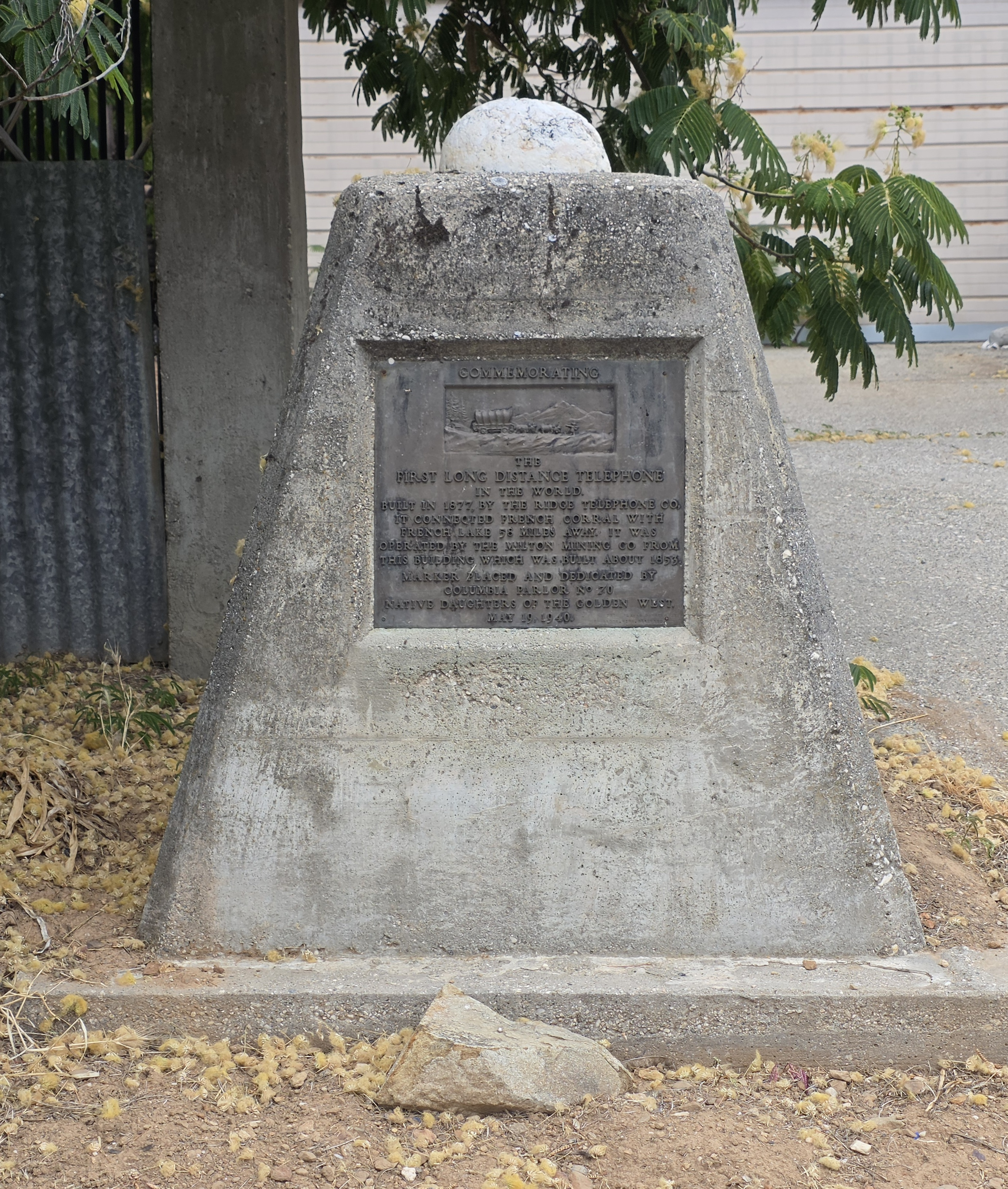
First Long Distance Telephone In The World historic site marker in French Corral

The world's first long-distance telephone line was built in 1878 by the Ridge Telephone Company. It connected French Corral with French Lake, approximately 60 miles away, and it was operated by the Milton Mining Company. This historic accomplishment is memorialized by California State Historic Marker #247 near the center of the physical remains of French Corral on Pleasant Valley Road.

== Geography ==
French Corral is located at 39°18′22″N 121°09′37″W, and the elevation is 1,532 feet (467 m) above sea level.

=== Climate ===
According to the Köppen Climate Classification system, French Corral has a warm-summer Mediterranean climate, abbreviated "Csa" on climate maps.

== Demographics ==
In 1880, the population was 527.

== Historical landmarks ==
- In 1877, it was the terminus of the world's first long-distance telephone line.
- The Bridgeport Covered Bridge is reputed by some to be the longest single-span wooden covered bridge in the world; the other leading contender is Old Blenheim Bridge in New York State.
