= San Juan Ridge =

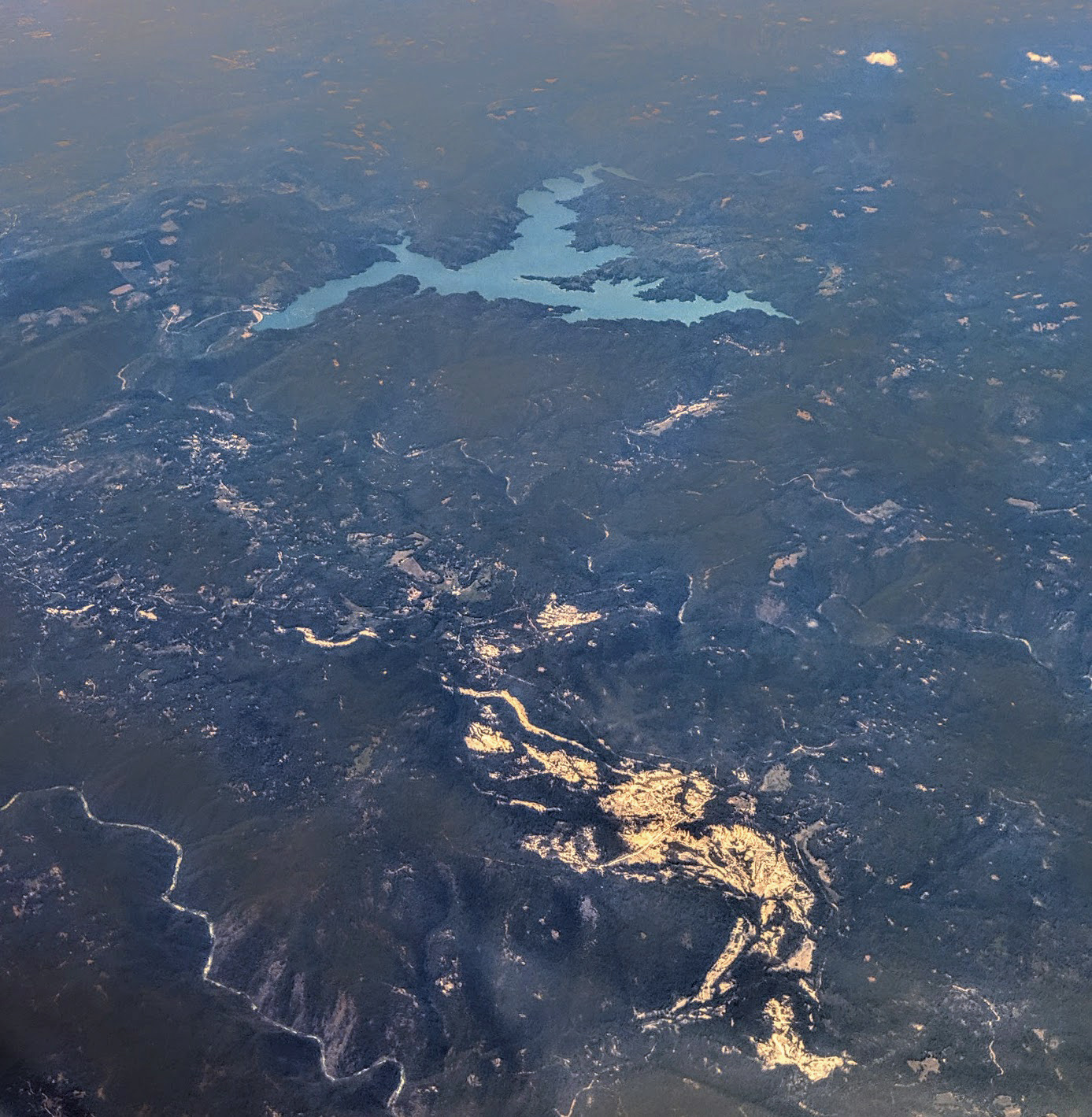
Aerial view of San Juan Ridge (foreground) and New Bullards Bar Reservoir (background), from the southeast. Bright areas are placer-mined gravel areas; South Yuba River at lower left.

The San Juan Ridge (39°22′40″N 121°01′33″W) is a geographic feature extending approximately 24 miles (39 km) east-northeast between the South and Middle Yuba Rivers in the foothills of the northern Sierra Nevada. The elevation is approximately 790 m (2,600 ft) above sea level.

== History ==
"The Ridge" was notable for hydraulic mining during the California gold rush, the largest operation of its kind being run by North Bloomfield Mining and Gravel Company. French Corral was the first mining camp on The Ridge. In the 1990s, research was conducted to renew gold mining efforts.

== Tourism ==
The South Yuba River State Park and Malakoff Diggins State Historic Park are nearby, as is historic Nevada City, California.
