= The Glenbrook =

Preserved American 2-6-0 locomotive

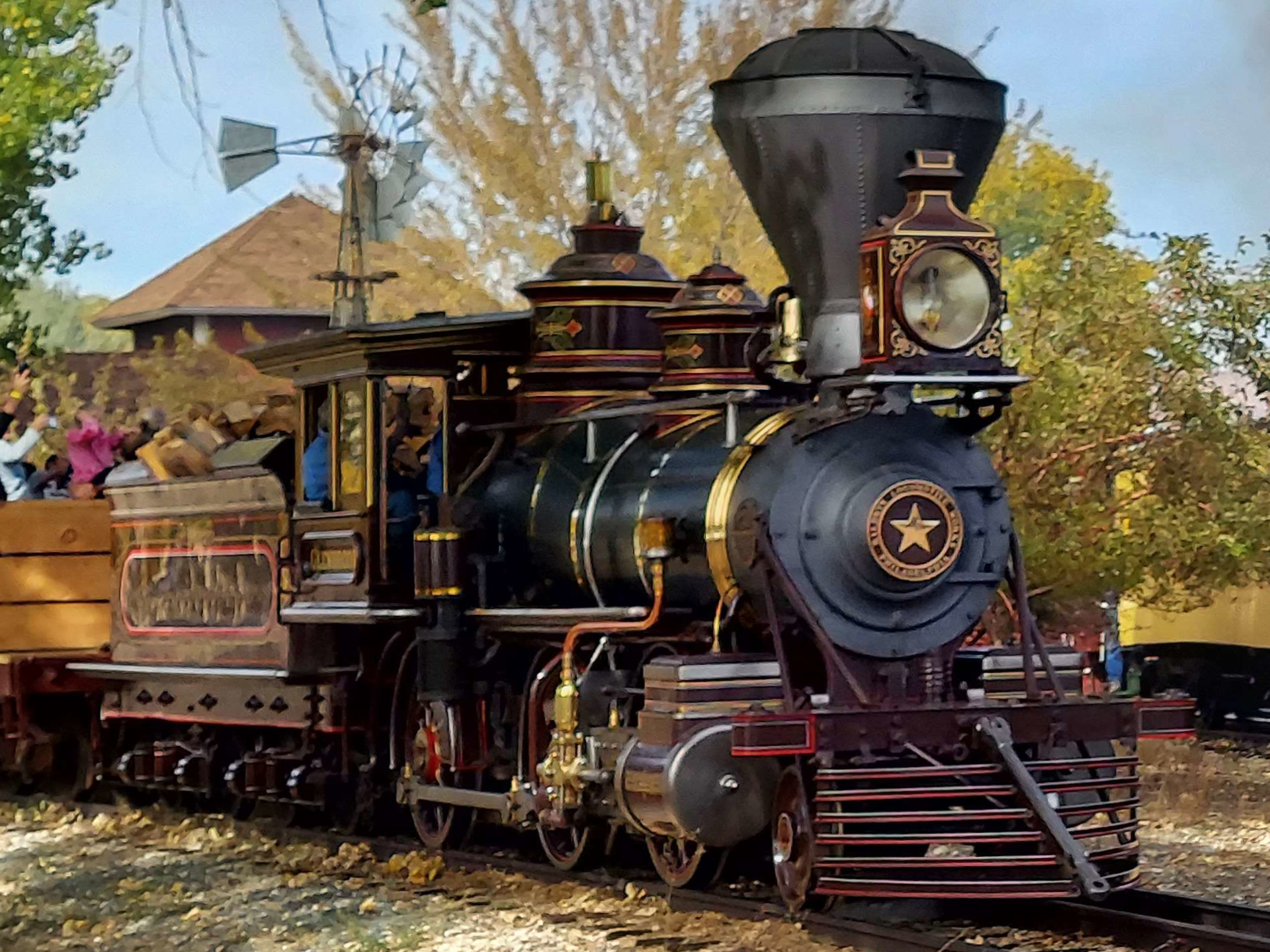
Type and origin
- Power type: Steam
- Builder: Baldwin Locomotive Works
- Serial number: 3712
- Model: 8-20 D
- Build date: March 1875
Specifications
- Configuration
  - Whyte: 2-6-0
- Gauge: 3 ft (914 mm)
- Leading dia.: 24 in (610 mm)
- Wheelbase: 18 ft 7 in (5.7 m) loco only
- Loco weight: 26 short tons (24 t; 23 long tons)
- Tender weight: 12,900 pounds (6.5 ST; 5.9 t; 5.8 LT)
- Fuel type: Wood
- Water cap.: 1,200 US gal (1,000 imp gal; 4,500 L)
- Firebox
  - Grate area: 7.58 sq ft (0.704 m^{2})
- Boiler pressure: 130 psi (0.90 MPa)
- Heating surface
  - Tubes: 157.6 sq ft (14.64 m^{2})
- Cylinders: Two, outside
- Cylinder size: 13 in × 16 in (330 mm × 406 mm)
- Valve gear: Stephenson
- Valve type: Slide valve
- Valve travel: 4.4375 in (113 mm)
- Valve lap: 0.625 in (16 mm)
- Valve lead: 0.1 in (3 mm)
- Loco brake: Air
- Train brakes: (1899) Westinghouse A-1
- Couplers: Link-and-pin
Performance figures
- Maximum speed: Fastest recorded: 25 mph (40 km/h)
- Tractive effort: 7,378 lbf (32,820 N)
Career
- Operators: Carson and Tahoe Lumber and Fluming Company; Lake Tahoe Railway and Transportation Company; Nevada County Narrow Gauge Railroad; Nevada State Railroad Museum
- Number in class: 3
- Numbers: Glenbrook, later 1; Tahoe, later 2; 3
- First run: June 1875
- Retired: 1898 (C&TL&F); 1926 (LTR&T)
- Restored: 1925 (LTR&T); 2015 (NSRM)
- Current owner: Nevada State Railroad Museum
- Disposition: Operational
- The Glenbrook
- U.S. National Register of Historic Places
- Location within Nevada Location within the United States
- Location: 600 N. Carson St., Carson City, Nevada
- Coordinates: 39°10′7″N 119°43′54″W
- Area: 1 acre (0.40 ha)
- Built: 1875
- Architect: Baldwin Locomotive Works
- Architectural style: Steam Locomotive
- NRHP reference No.: 81000702
- Added to NRHP: May 01, 1981

Glenbrook is a 2-6-0 "Mogul" type narrow-gauge steam locomotive, built by Baldwin Locomotive Works in 1875 for the Carson and Tahoe Lumber and Fluming Company's 3 ft (914 mm) Lake Tahoe narrow-gauge railroad.

== History ==
The Glenbrook and sisters Tahoe and 3 were built to haul cordwood and lumber from Glenbrook, Nevada on the east shore of Lake Tahoe to Spooner Summit, at the crest of the Carson Range. At the summit, the logs and lumber were put in a flume which carried it to the south end of Carson City. There it was loaded onto flatcars of the Virginia and Truckee Railroad which carried it to Virginia City for use in construction of the town, as mine timbers, and as boiler fuel.

In late 1886, the C&TL&F purchased G. W. Chubbuck's Lake Valley Railroad in Bijou, California. This included the Porter locomotive Santa Cruz, and No. 3 was moved to Bijou soon afterward. Briefly, that engine was given the number 1, and Glenbrook received the number 4. Around this time it also had an injector mounted on the engineer's side, which it retained until late 1891 when No. 3 struck a cow in Lake Valley. Since then, Glenbrook has carried No. 3's crosshead pump.

The area was logged out by 1898 and the C&TL&F ended railroad operations after the 1898 season. That winter, the railroads at Glenbrook and Bijou, along with most of the towns, were moved to Tahoe City, California, on the west shore of the lake. From there, the mills were moved to Carters in Tuolumne County and most of the town structures were moved to Truckee and Hobart Mills. The railroad equipment was used build a new railroad about 16 miles (26 km) to the Southern Pacific Railroad station at Truckee. Engines 2 and 4 were sold to the Nevada County Narrow Gauge Railroad, while the Glenbrook and #3 were retained. The new line, the Lake Tahoe Railway and Transportation (LTR&T) carried freight and passengers and connected with the company's steamboat lines at Tahoe City. The Bliss family leased the LTR&T to the Southern Pacific in 1925, and the line was converted to standard gauge effective 1 May 1926. The Glenbrook is now part of the Nevada State Railroad Museum collection.

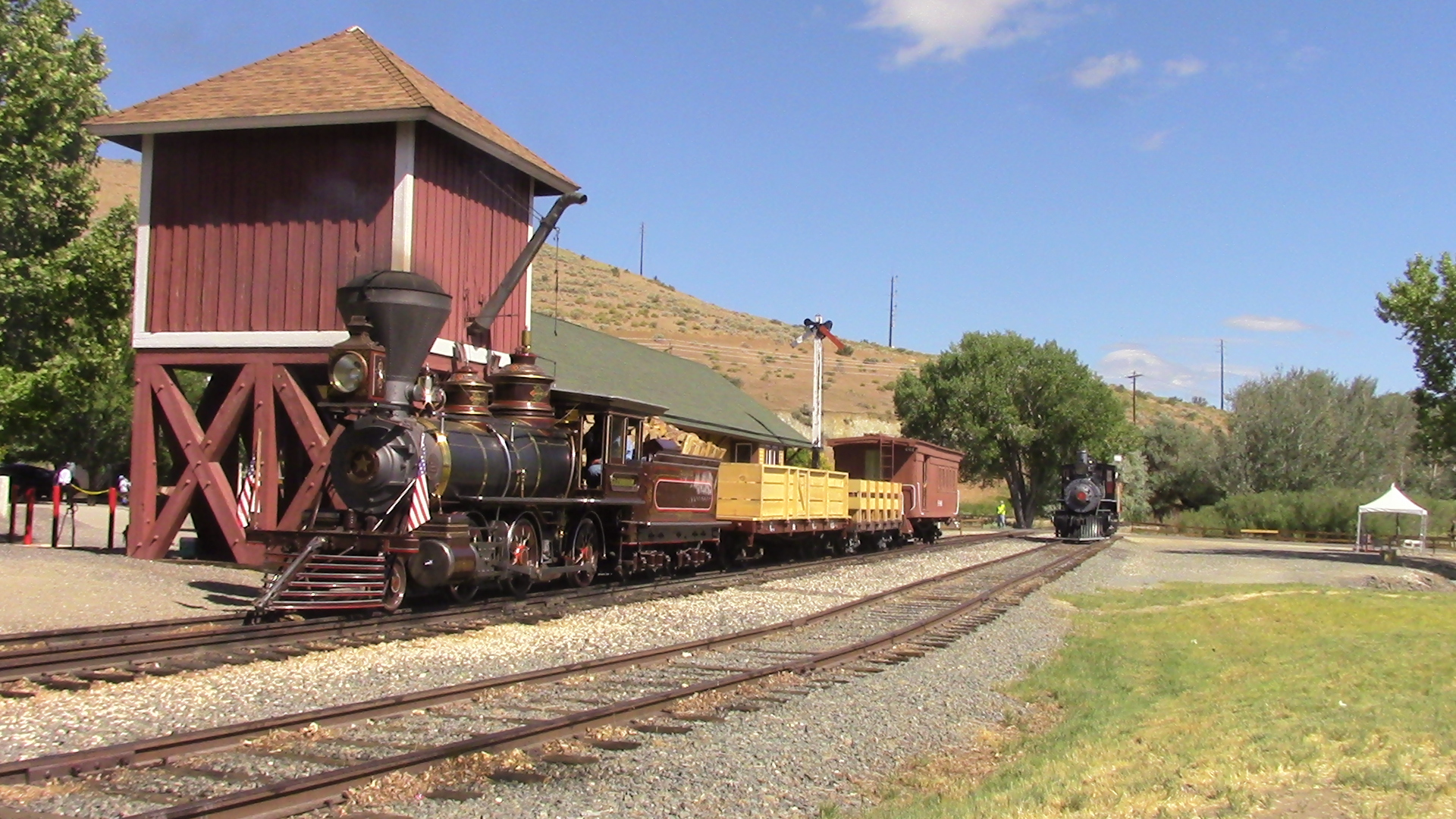
Glenbrook with a passenger train during the Nevada State Railroad Museum's Great Western Steam Up

The Bliss family kept No. 1 and stored it at Tahoe City until 1937 when they sold it to the Nevada County Narrow Gauge, which used it largely for parts for Tahoe. The NCNG shut down in 1942, but Hope Bliss convinced her family to buy the locomotive back from the NCNG and presented it to the Nevada State Museum and to the Nevada State Railroad Museum where it underwent major work. The locomotive's return was announced complete in 2015 and was unveiled to the public on 23 May.

In 2021, The Glenbrook visited the Cumbres and Toltec Scenic Railroad for their Victorian Iron Horse Round Up Celebration with the Eureka locomotive.

The Glenbrook was added to the National Register of Historic Places in 1981.
