= Nevada County Narrow Gauge Railroad Museum =

Railroad museum in California, USA

Coordinates: 39°14′58″N 121°1′7″W

- Locale: Nevada City, California

Commercial operations
- Built by: The Nevada County Narrow Gauge Railroad Company
- Original gauge: 3 ft (914 mm)

Preserved operations
- Reporting mark: NCNC
- Preserved gauge: 3 ft (914 mm)

Commercial history
- Opened: 1876
- Closed: 1942

Preservation history
- Headquarters: Grass Valley, California

Website
- http://www.ncngrrmuseum.org

The Nevada County Narrow Gauge Railroad Museum is a transport museum and heritage railroad located in Nevada City, California.

== Background ==
The museum was founded in 1983. It is owned by the City of Nevada City and operated by the Nevada County Historical Society.

It offers a collection of railroad artifacts, photographs, and documents related to the Nevada County Narrow Gauge Railroad, the 3 ft (914 mm) narrow-gauge railroad that operated in Nevada and Placer Counties from 1876 until 1942. Exhibits include Engine No. 5, which appeared in many movies, and various pieces of restored rolling stock.

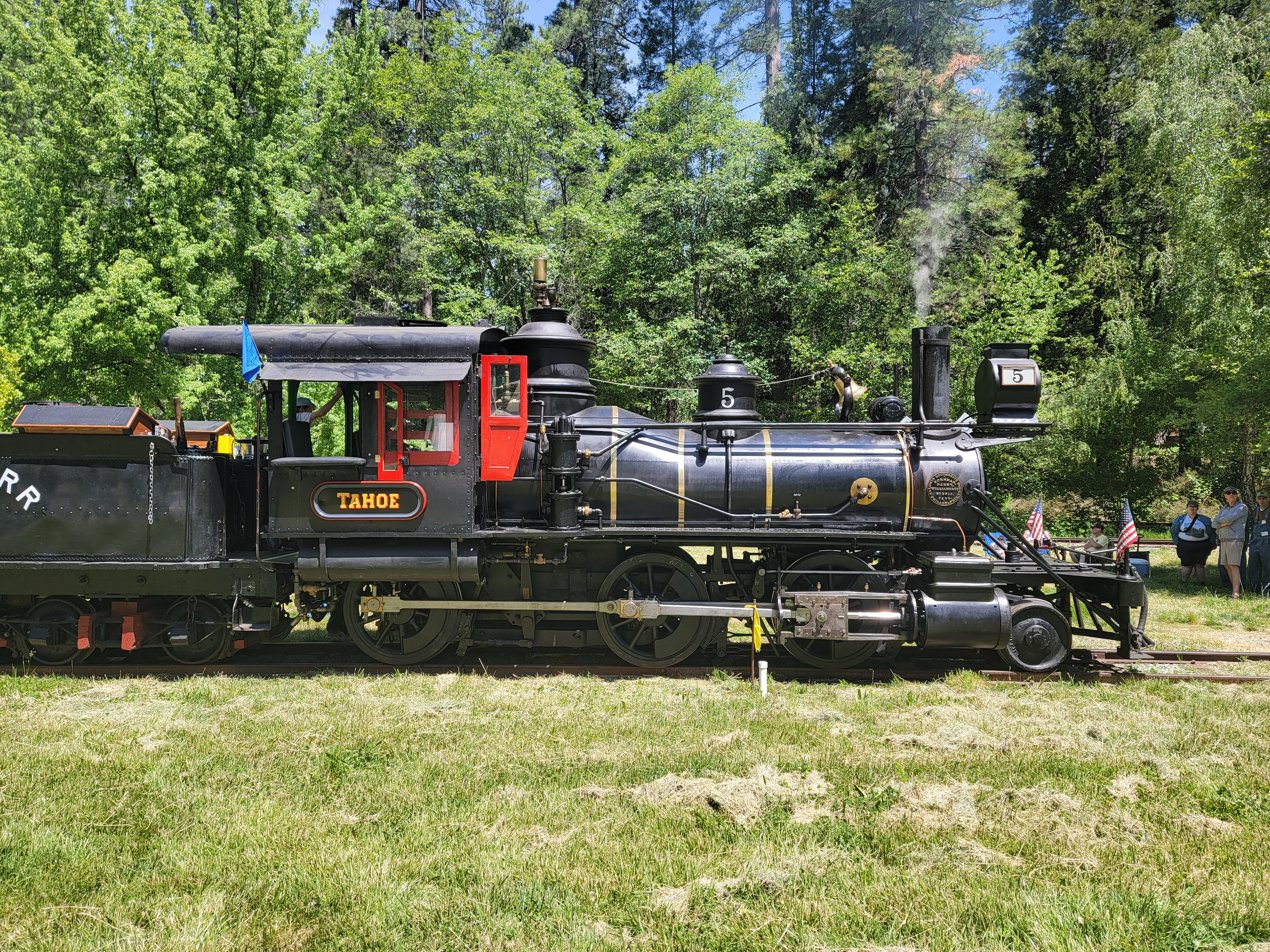
Engine No. 5. operating in 2025

In 1875, the Baldwin Locomotive Works of Philadelphia made two identical 26 ton 2-6-0 Mogul locomotives for the Carson and Tahoe Lumber and Fluming Company in Carson City, Nevada which was then developing the Lake Tahoe Railroad to haul lumber. One of those locomotives is The Glenbrook, currently operating at the Nevada State Railroad Museum in Carson City. The other is Engine #5, called "The Tahoe" which was later sold to the Nevada County Narrow Gauge Railroad in June, 1899. The locomotive was damaged in a fire in Grass Valley, California on August 30, 1915, losing its wooden cab and running boards.

When the railroad shut down in 1942, Engine #5 was sold to Frank Lloyd Productions in Hollywood. It appeared in movies such as The Spoilers and Rails Into Laramie. The locomotive later was owned by Universal Studios in Hollywood before being returned to Nevada County, renovated, and being put back into service at the museum.

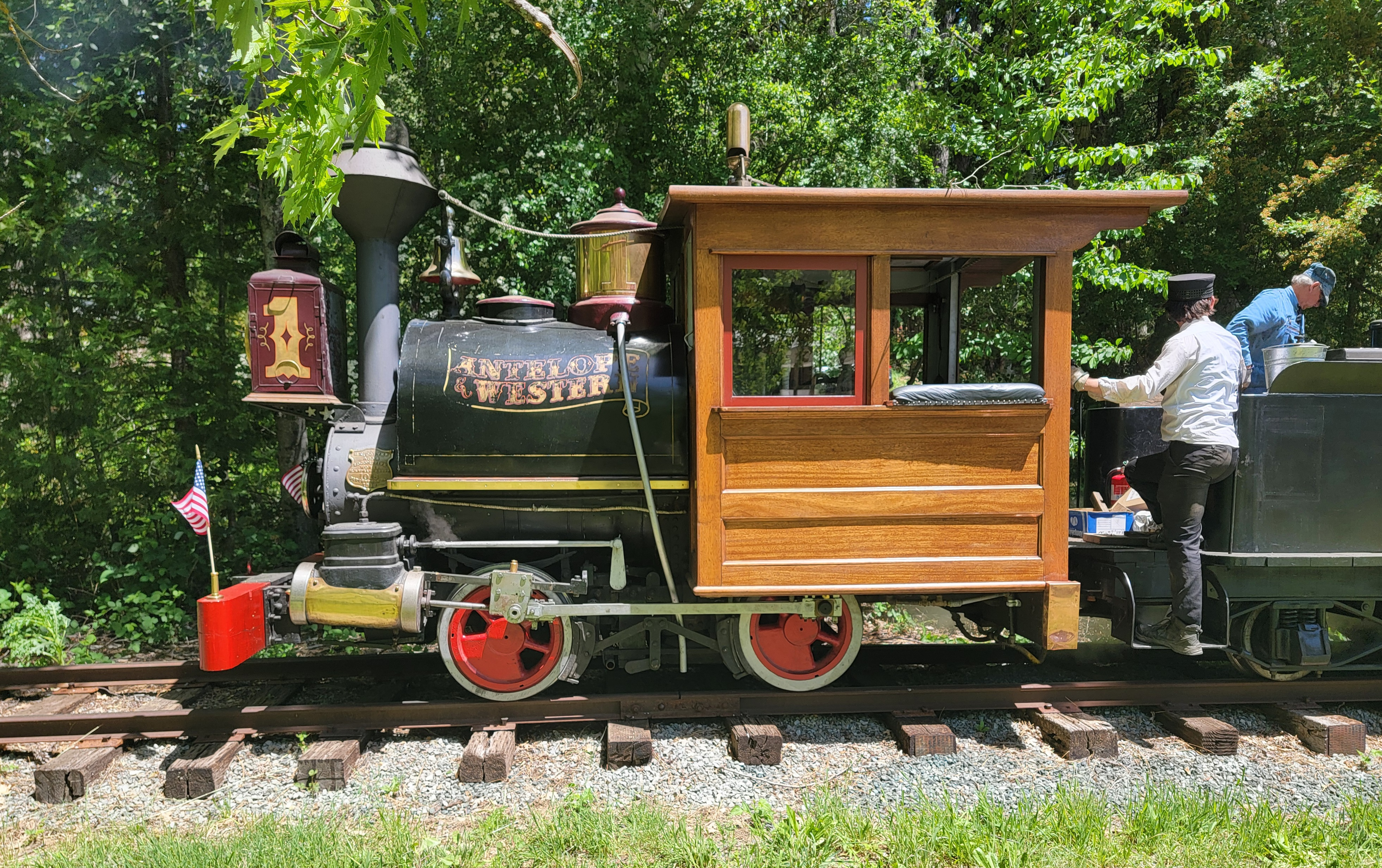
Antelope & Western Porter locomotive No. 1

The museum also has the Antelope & Western Porter #1 locomotive in its collection. This small industrial steam 0-4-0 tank locomotive was built by H.K. Porter, Inc. in 1889 for the Sacramento Brick Company.

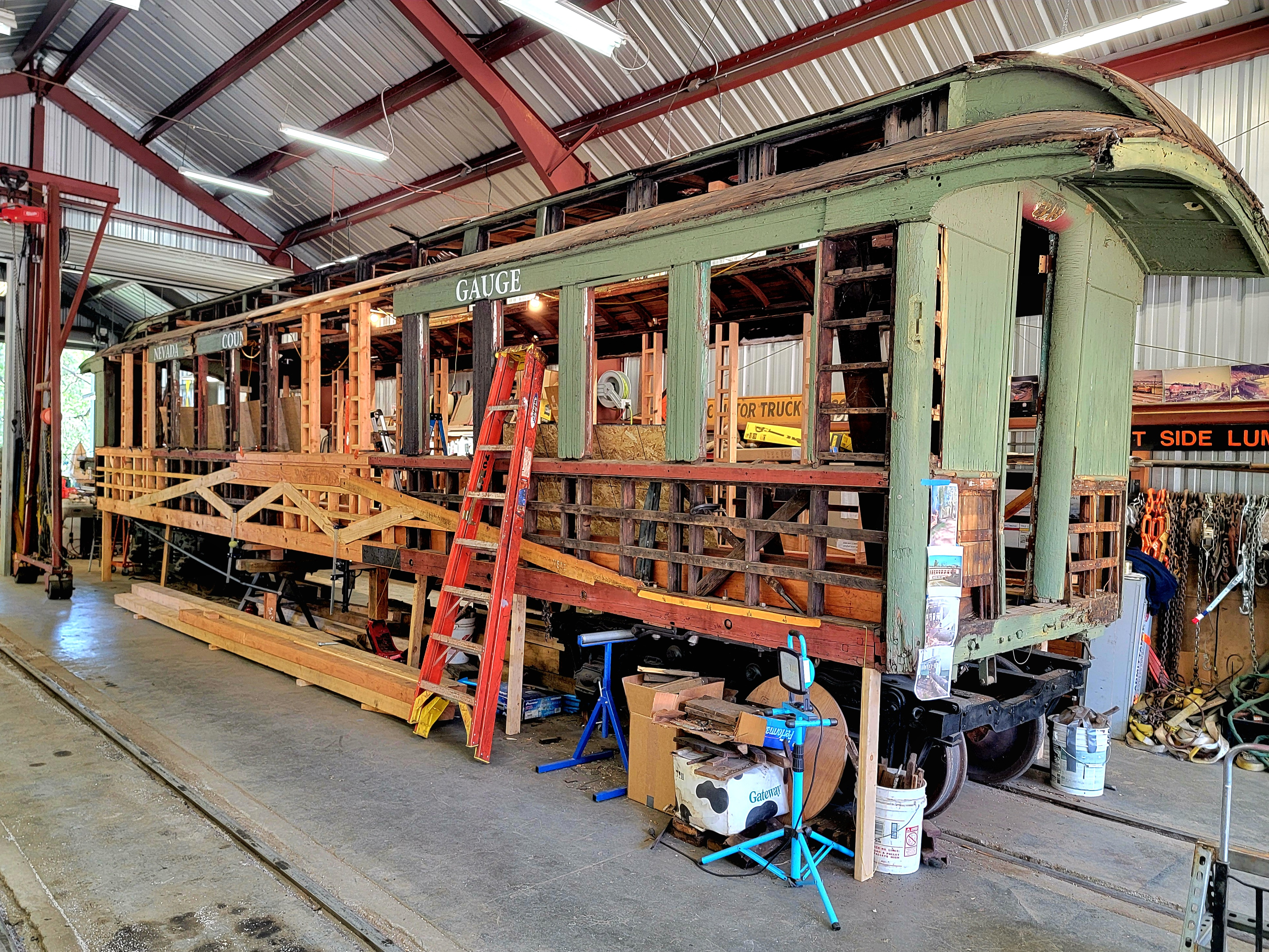
Passenger car being renovated at the museum

The museum operates its own renovation shop which rebuilds historic equipment.

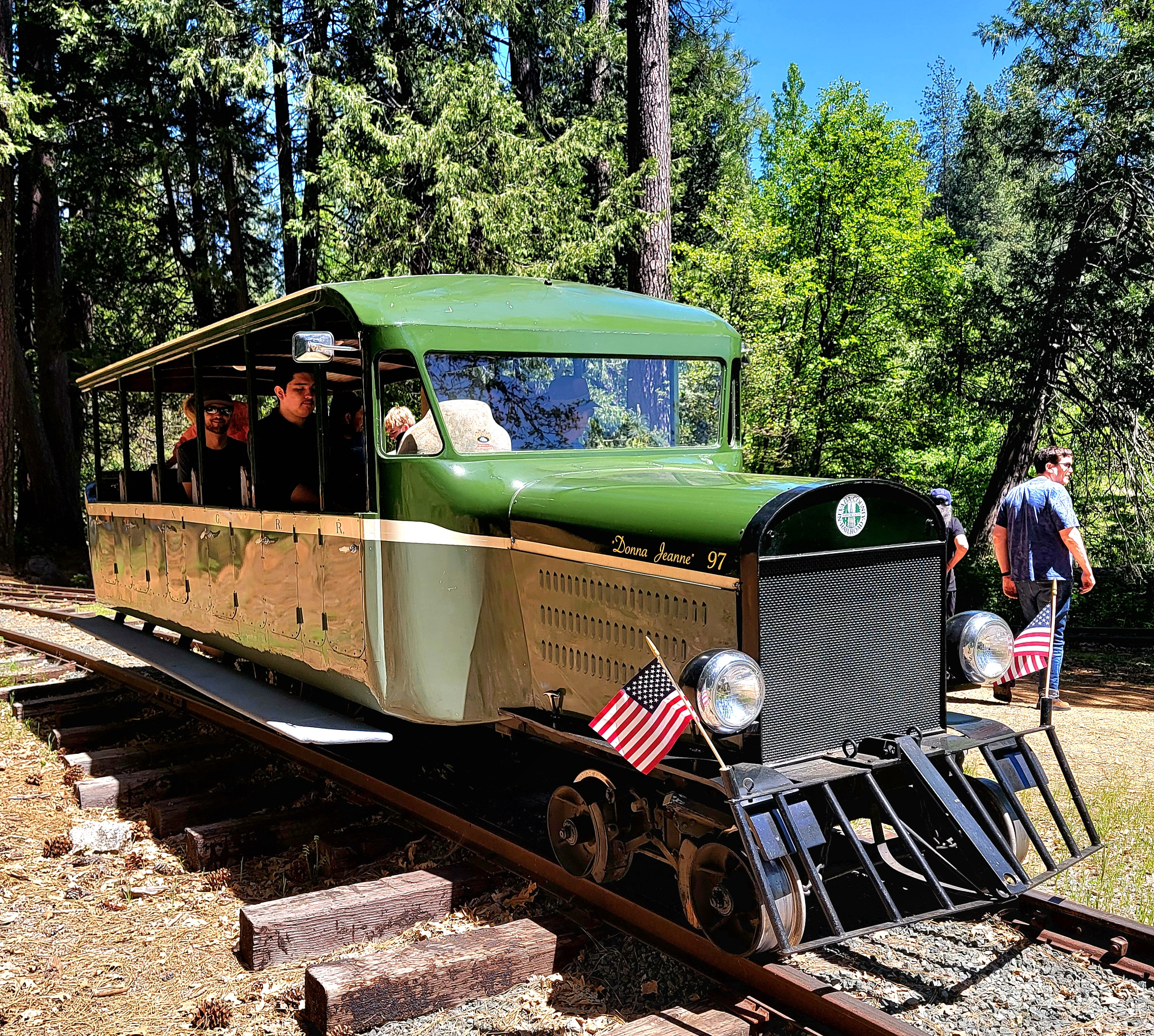
Railbus transporting passengers

Short excursions on board a variety of railroad equipment including a railbus are offered in the museum's rail yard.

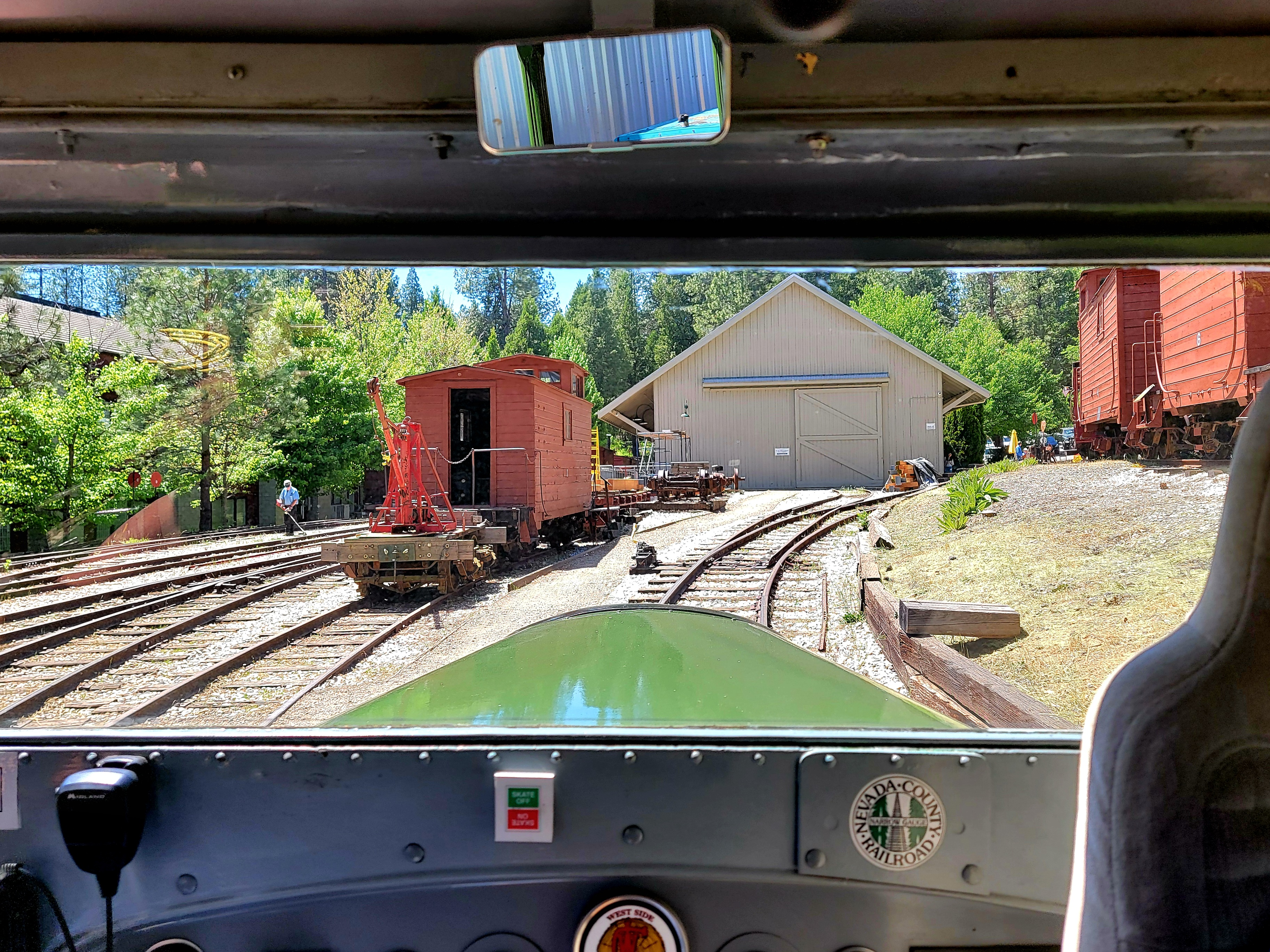
View of the museum's rail yard from the railbus

The county's first steam automobile and displays of local aviation history are also presented.

== See also ==
- List of heritage railroads in the United States
