= Duane Leroy Bliss =

American timber and mining magnate

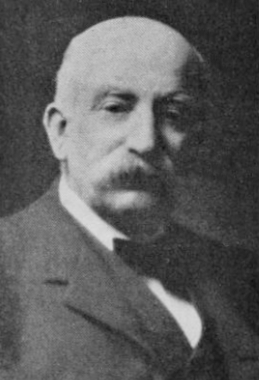
- Born: June 10, 1833; Savoy, Massachusetts, United States
- Died: December 23, 1907 (aged 74); Carson City, Nevada, United States
- Occupation: Industrialist

Duane Leroy Bliss (June 10, 1833 – December 23, 1907) was a 19th-century American timber and mining magnate. He founded the Carson and Tahoe Lumber and Fluming Company from Gold Hill, Nevada. He eventually controlled every facet of the business from the land to the timber, ships and barges to move the timber, flumes and the railroad system he built.

== Early life ==
Duane Bliss was born on June 10, 1833 to William Bliss and Lucia Bliss (née Barney) in Savoy, Massachusetts. After completing his formal schooling at age 13, he left his birth home in Savoy, Massachusetts to work as a cabin boy on a ship bound for South America. At 15, Bliss became interested in California Gold Rush and booked passage on a ship to Panama, with plans to travel across the isthmus before catching a steamer to San Francisco.

== Career ==
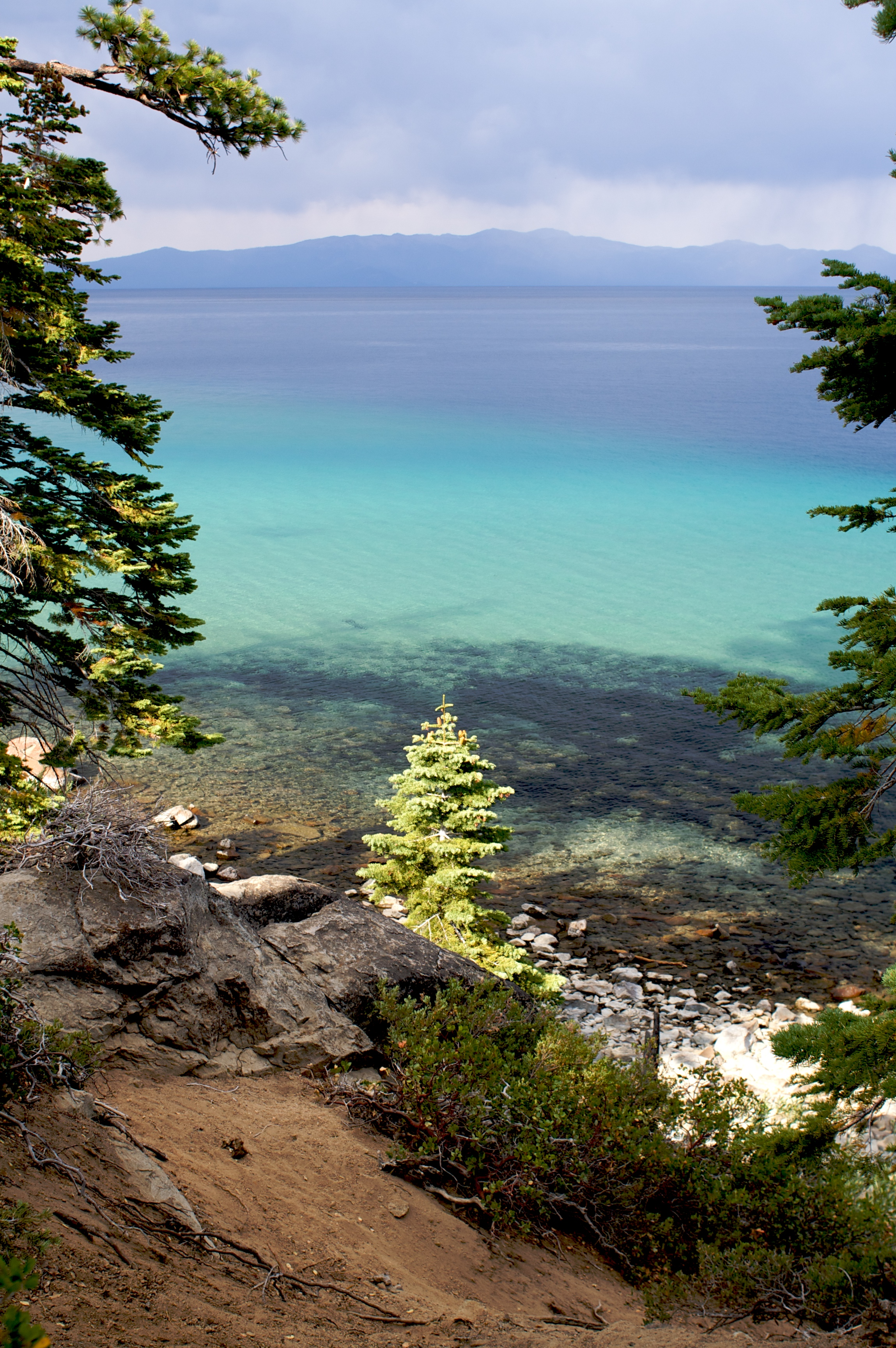
D. L. Bliss State Park

Duane Bliss founded the Carson and Tahoe Lumber and Fluming Company in Gold Hill, Nevada. In 1907 he completed the renowned Glenbrook Inn, which became a tourist destination for the elite families of San Francisco.

Bliss initiated a form of medical insurance for his employees, charging fifty cents per month for complete medical care. A well-paid laborer received $4 per day.

After the end of the logging era in 1893, Bliss anticipated the tourism potential of Lake Tahoe. He moved his logging trains from Glenbrook to Tahoe City on the northwest shore of the lake and converted them to passenger service. Bliss's Lake Tahoe Transportation Co. was later connected to Southern Pacific's international rail service to Truckee, California.

Bliss owned valuable mountain land, some of which was later donated to the State of California and named D. L. Bliss State Park in his honor.

He died in Carson City, Nevada on December 23, 1907.

== See also ==
- SS Tahoe
