= Nevada County Narrow Gauge Railroad =

Railroad in Nevada and Placer Counties, California

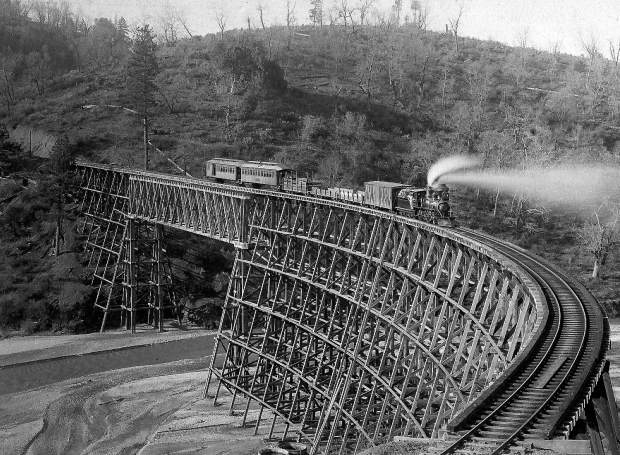
- Mixed passenger and freight train on the Bear River bridge in 1895

Overview
- Headquarters: Grass Valley, California
- Locale: Northern California
- Dates of operation: 1876–1942
- Successor: Abandoned

Technical
- Track gauge: 3 ft (914 mm)

The Nevada County Narrow Gauge Railroad (NCNGRR; nickname: Never Come, Never Go) was located in Northern California's Nevada County and Placer County, where it connected with the Central Pacific Railroad. The Nevada County Narrow Gauge Railroad Company incorporated on April 4, 1874, and was headquartered in Grass Valley, California. Construction commenced in January 1875, and was completed May 22, 1876. Passenger and commercial rail services continued until 1943. The 22.53 mi (36.26 km) line ran from Colfax, north through Grass Valley to Nevada City. At one time, the railroad was notable for having the highest railroad bridge in California, the Bear River Bridge, built in 1908.

As was typical when railroads were built, freight rates dropped to a fraction of what they had been before with wagon transportation. This stimulated all forms of economic activity in the region.

== Need ==
The need for rail service in the semi-mountainous and wooded area of Grass Valley and Nevada City was precipitated by mining operations subsequent to the California Gold Rush. In addition, timber operators wanted to make their land accessible to the Southern Pacific Company in Colfax.

== History ==
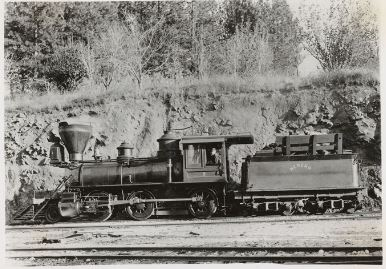
Nevada County Narrow Gauge RR #5, at Colfax, California. This engine still exists and is at the Nevada County Narrow Gauge Railroad Museum in Nevada City, California (Bancroft Library, UC Berkeley Collection).

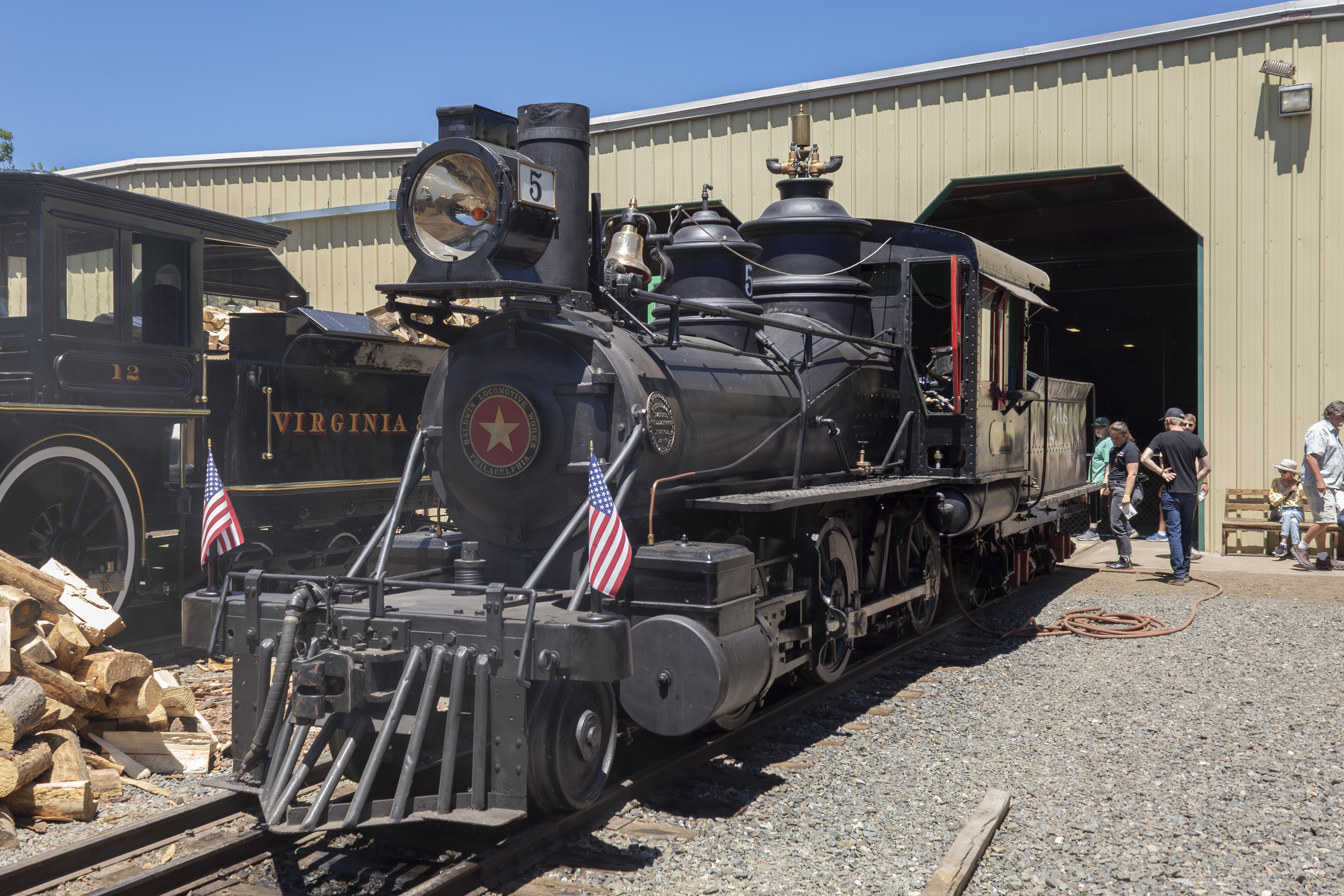
Restored Nevada County Narrow Gauge #5 on display during a visit to the Nevada State Railroad Museum in 2022

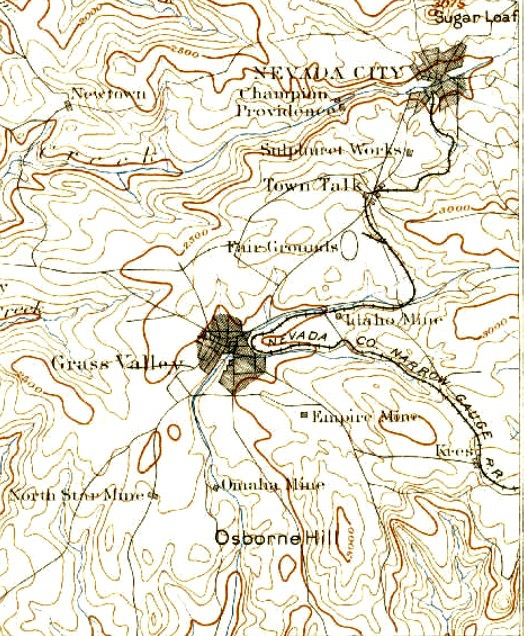
Route in 1895 from Nevada City to Grass Valley

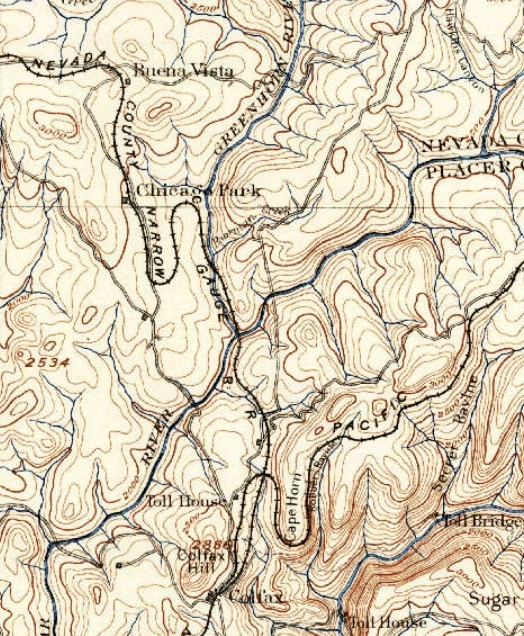
Route from Grass Valley to Colfax in 1902

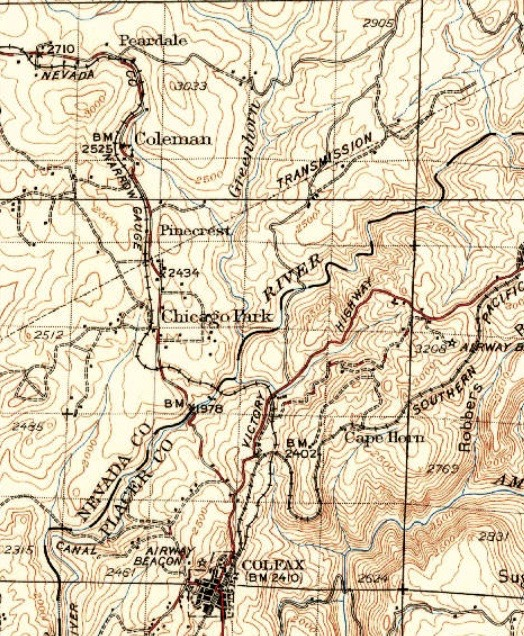
Route from Grass Valley to Colfax in 1938

On January 24, 1874, Charles Marsh, who was a prominent citizen of Nevada City (he was a civil engineer and a founder of the Central Pacific Railroad) and 19 others organized a "Committee of Twenty" to build a narrow-gauge railroad from Nevada City and Grass Valley to connect with the transcontinental railroad at Colfax. Marsh also served as chairman of the executive committee of the Nevada & Grass Valley Railroad Association, and with his surveying/engineering background undoubtedly had a significant role in the planning of the railroad. He was also one of the initial investors, purchasing $10,000 worth of stock (a 5% stake).

On March 20, the California legislature and Governor Newton Booth approved the right to build and operate a 3 ft (914 mm) narrow gauge from Colfax, through Grass Valley, to Nevada City. On June 20, an Act of Congress granted the railroad right of way through public lands.

J. H. Bates estimated that construction and equipment would total US$411,132. Only one bid came in and it was for US$500,000, signed by M. F. Beatty; he received a lump sum of $500,000. Construction began January 1875. Turton & Knox were subcontracted for earthwork. John Flint Kidder was the chief engineer. Within two months, 600 men were employed in the railroad's construction.

As the first contractor, Beatty, was unable to complete the project, a second, J. K. Bynre, was brought in; construction was completed in the spring of 1876. The inaugural train, from Colfax to Grass Valley, ran on April 11 and by May 20, the first train reached Nevada City.

The company's first President was John C. Coleman, president of the North Star Mine. Kidder, the builder, decided to settle down in Grass Valley, becoming the General Superintendent, and in 1884, became the second president. Upon his death in 1901, Kidder's widow, Sarah, took over, becoming the first female railroad president in the world.

In September 1907, a 3.56 mi (5.73 km) "cut-off", at a cost of $132,285 (~$3.33 million in 2025) was built, bettering the grade. The following year, construction was completed on the Bear River Bridge. By 1912, the NCNGRR was running three mixed trains daily, each way, between Nevada City and Colfax, while a fourth mixed train ran daily, each way, between Grass Valley and Colfax. Sarah Kidder sold her interests in 1913 and retired to San Francisco.

In 1926, Earl Taylor and his associates purchased the railroad for $1. With the outbreak of World War II, they sold it in 1942 for $251,000 (~$3.91 million in 2025) to Dulian Steel Products Company and the last train to run over the line was on May 29.

== Construction ==
Construction included two bridges, two tunnels, and five trestles.

This road is a 3 feet (0.91 m) narrow gauge; commenced in January 1875, and completed May 22, 1876. Its length measures 22.3 miles (35.9 km). This is a very crooked road, has 15 trestle bridges, aggregating 5,176 feet (1,578 m), two truss bridges, each 165 feet (50 m) long, and 97 feet (30 m) and 85 feet (26 m) high, respectively; and two tunnels, aggregating 800 feet (240 m).

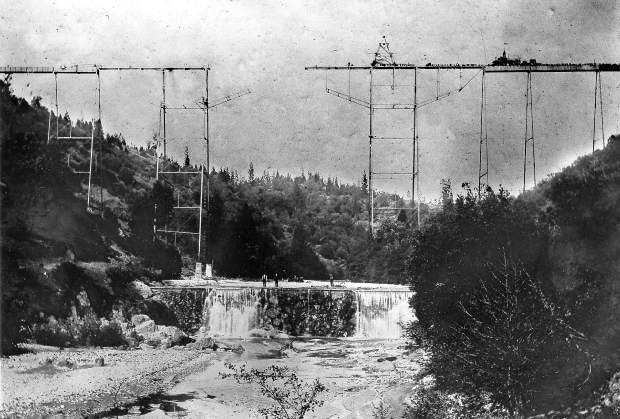
Bridge over Bear River during construction, 1908

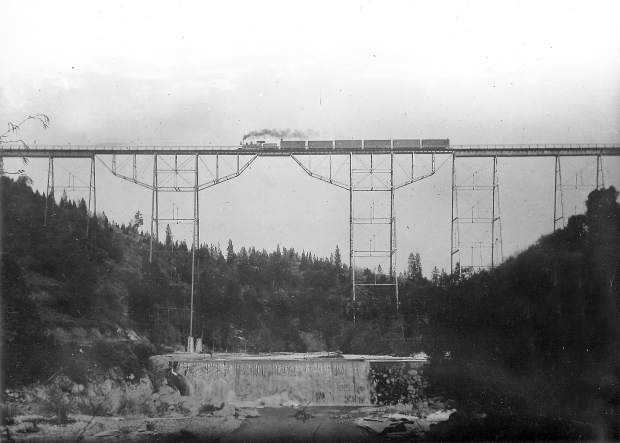
Engine No. 2 crossing the new steel bridge in December 1908

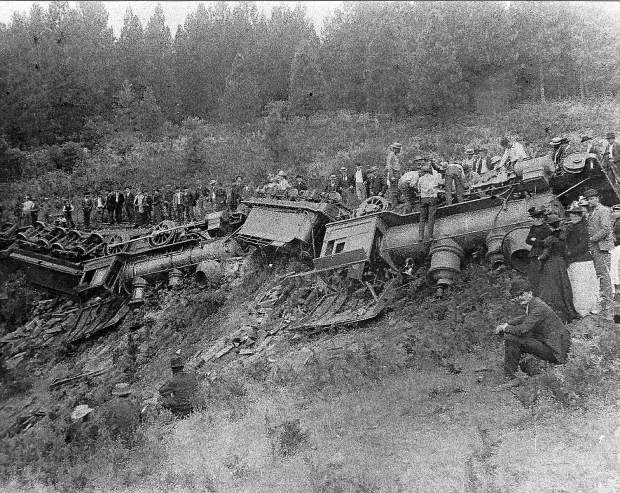
Circus train derailed in 1893, but lions and bears remained in cars

== Route ==
After leaving the Colfax depot, the road headed north, parallel with the Central Pacific Railroad, then crossed Bear River, and into Nevada County. One of the first stations was at the town of You Bet, which serviced the Goodwin Drift Gravel Mine. The road proceeded into Chicago Park, a fruit and grape growers colony, and then continued into Grass Valley.

The scenery includes a variety of mountains, chasms, canyons, dense forests, fields, pines, and manzanitas.

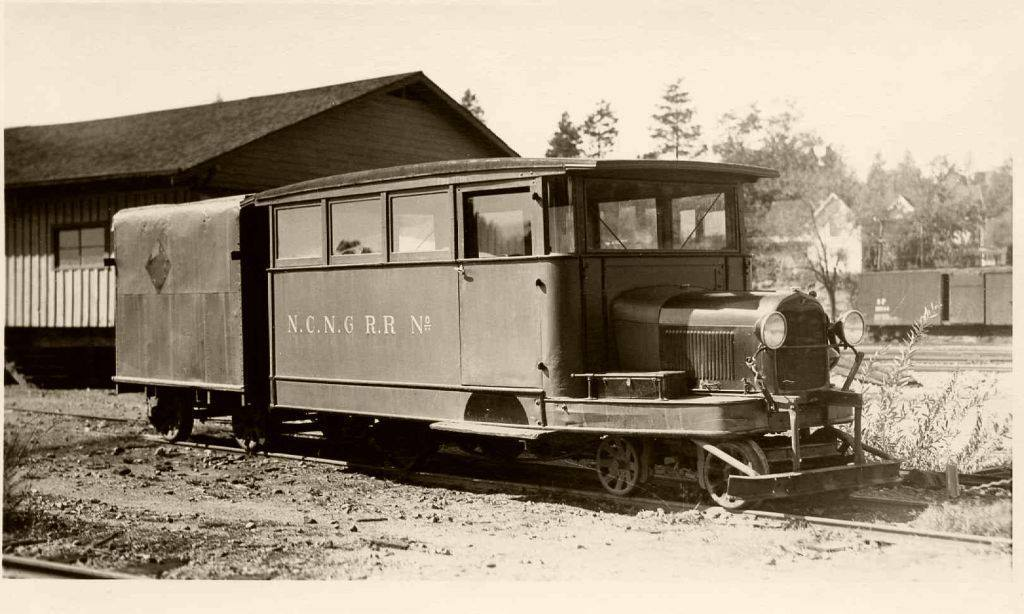
N.C.N.G.R.R. №

== Statistics ==
- Length:
  - Placer County: The main line was 5.62 mi (9.04 km) long, and had 1.73 mi (2.78 km) in spurs and sidings
  - Nevada County: The main line was 16.79 mi (27.02 km) long, and had 2.39 mi (3.85 km) in spurs and sidings.
- Maximum grade: 116 ft per mile (22 m per km), 1:45.7 or 2.2%
- Minimum radius of curvature: 302.9 ft (92.3 m).
- Weight: 35 pounds per yard (17.4 kg/m)
- Degrees of curvature: 7944
- Length of tangents: 53,908 ft (16,431 m)
- Ascents from Colfax: 1,159 ft (353 m)
- Descents from Colfax: 1,042 ft (318 m)
- Initial rates:
  - Passenger services: $0.10/mile
  - Freight services: $0.20/ton/mile
- Running time:
  - Absolute: 1 hour, 40 minutes
  - Mixed trains: Two hours
- Average stops: Four

== Locomotives ==
All cars and locomotives had Westinghouse railway brakes, and cars used for passenger service had Miller platform couplers.

Each combination coach had a small iron safe in the baggage compartment. Though $200,000,000 in gold was hauled out of Nevada County by the NCNGRR during its operation, there was never an attempted robbery.

Steam Locomotives
Number	Name	Type	Builder	SN	Built	Acquired	Disposition	Notes
1	Grass Valley	4-4-0	Baldwin Locomotive Works	3762	7/1875	1875	Scrapped in 1936	
1	Glenbrook	2-6-0	Baldwin Locomotive Works	3712	4/1875	1936	Sold to Hope & Will Bliss in 1942	Purchased from the Southern Pacific (operated on the Lake Tahoe Railway & Transportation Company). Originally built for the Carson & Tahoe Lumber & Fluming Company #2. Never operated on the NCNG and used for parts. In operational condition at the Nevada State Railroad Museum in Carson City, Nevada.
2	Nevada	2-6-0	Baldwin Locomotive Works	3758	7/1875	1875	Scrapped in 1936	Renamed Nevada City after the town of Nevada was renamed to Nevada City
3		4-4-0	Baldwin Locomotive Works	4172	9/1877	1877	Dismantled in 1926	Used as a parts source for 1 1915-1926. Boiler sold to a mine in Virginia City. Decommissioned in 1975 and stored at the Virginia & Truckee. Moved to NCNGRR Museum in 1997.
4	Santa Cruz	0-6-0	Porter-Bell	218	5/1875	1899	Dismantled in 1915	Purchased from the Lake Valley #1. Originally Santa Cruz & Felton, then Nevada-California-Oregon #1. Used for parts, boiler sold to sawmill near Colfax.
5	Tahoe	2-6-0	Baldwin Locomotive Works	3709	3/1875	1899	Sold in 1940 to Frank Lloyd Movie Productions	Purchased from the Carson & Tahoe Lumber & Fluming Company #1. Later donated by Universal Studios to the Nevada County Narrow Gauge Museum where it now operates.
6		2-6-0	New York Locomotive Works	22	1883	1915	Retired in 1921	Purchased from the La Dicha & Pacific #1. Originally Toledo, Cincinnati & St Louis #49, then Portland & Willamette Valley #3, then South Pacific Coast #25. Scrapped in 1936.
7		4-4-0	Baldwin Locomotive Works	5782	8/1881	1929	Scrapped in 1934	Purchased from Carson & Colorado #4.
8		2-8-0	Baldwin Locomotive Works	4938/ 6057	1/1880 2/1882	1933	Sold in 1942 to Pacific Portland Cement #8	Made from Denver & Rio Grande Western locomotives. The boiler of #42 and the Running Gear of #283. Sold in 1943 to Imperial Portland Cement #8. Scrapped in 1947.
9		2-8-0	Baldwin Locomotive Works	41300	4/1914	1933	Sold in 1942 to Dulien Steel Products	Purchased from the Southern Pacific (narrow gauge) #1. Originally Nevada-California-Oregon #14. Sold in 1946 as U.S. Navy #17 to Hawaii Pineapple Company and reportedly lost.

=== Other motive power and cars ===
Engine 10 was built by Fate-Root-Heath Company of Plymouth, Ohio, and was in service only during the first six months of 1936.

Engine 11 was built by Whitcomb Manufacturing Company of Rochelle, Illinois, and was in service 1936–1942.

Many of the railroad's cars were built by Carter Brothers, which was the major car-builder on the West Coast in the 1800s.

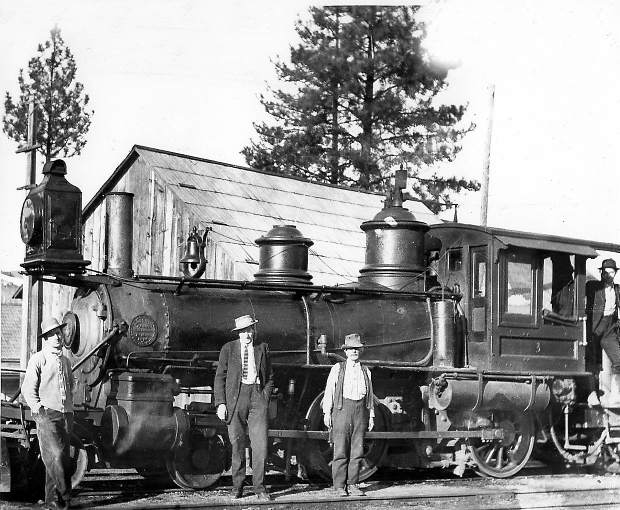
Engine No. 3 at the Nevada City depot, 1913

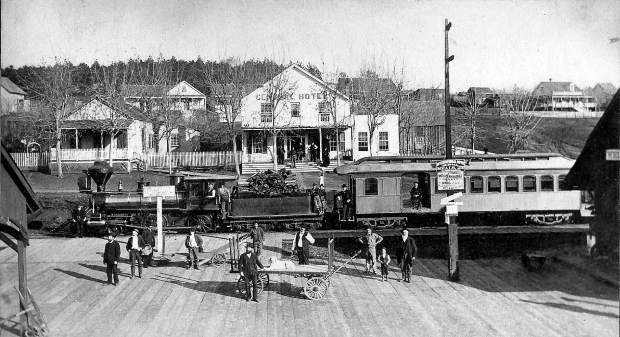
Engine No. 3 at Colfax railroad station, 1878

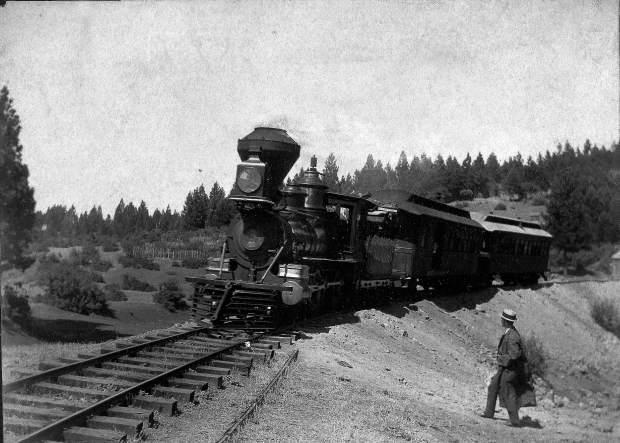
A passenger train rounds the curve.

== Historic recognition ==
In the centennial year after the railroad began operations, E Clampus Vitus erected a historical marker in Colfax at 39°6.011′N 120°57.159′W near the old NCNGRR depot, the southern end of the line. The Nevada County Narrow Gauge Railroad & Transportation Museum was created in recent years near the northern end of the line in Nevada City.

=== Chinese workers ===
Construction of the Nevada County Narrow Gauge Railroad in 1875–1876 relied on more than 300 Chinese immigrant laborers. They graded the 22‑mile route between Nevada City and Colfax using hand tools, horse‑drawn scrapers and carts, completing the work in early 1876. Although considered dependable, these crews were paid less than white workers. Most moved on after completion, but some remained as track crews; several Chinese businessmen in Nevada City also invested in the railroad and held stock into the 20th century. In June 2022 the county dedicated a historical marker (NEV 22‑01) at the Nevada City terminus to honor their contributions.
