= Sarah Kidder =

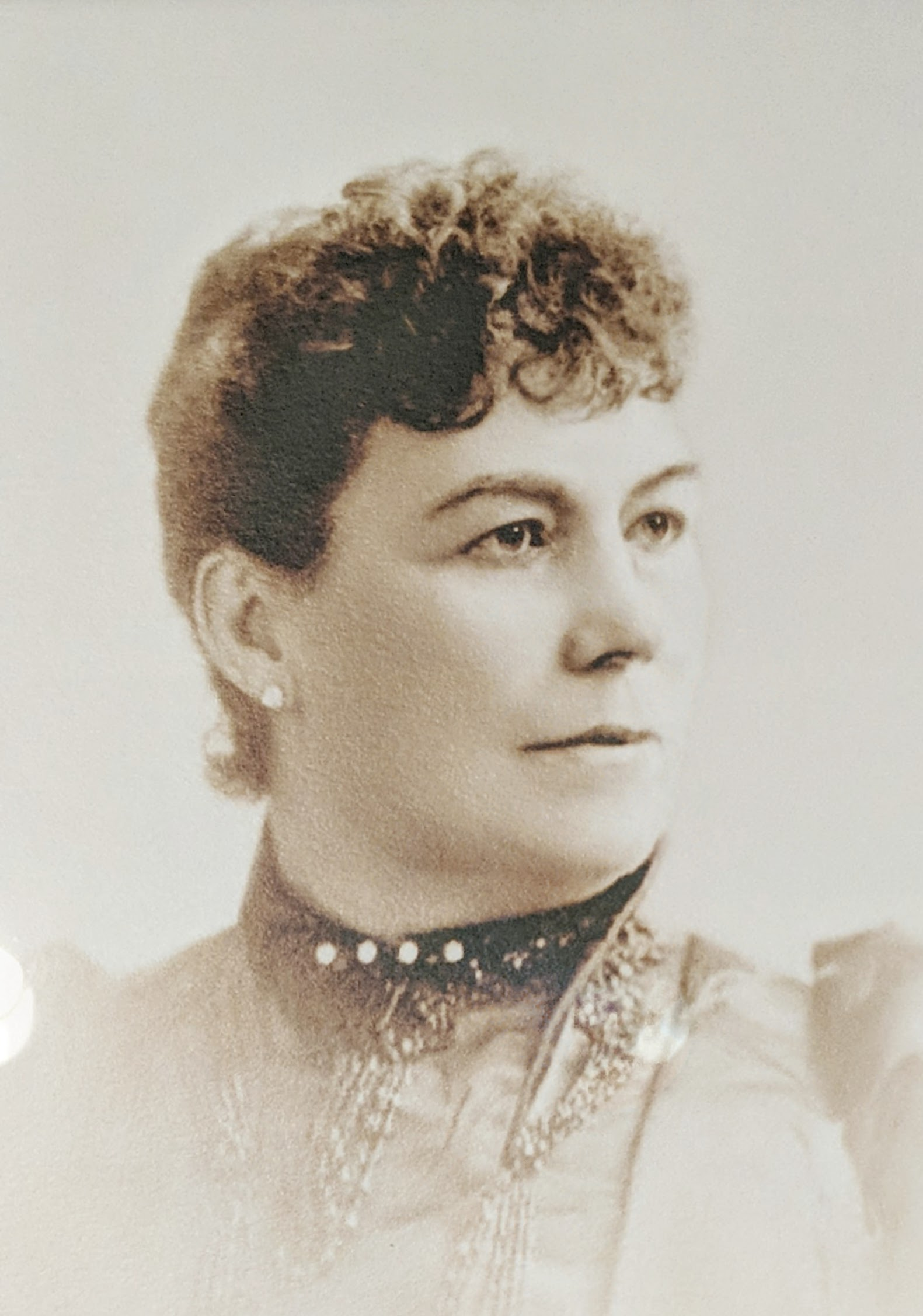
Sarah Kidder.

Sarah Clark Kidder (née Clark; c. 1839 – September 1933) was president of Northern California's Nevada County Narrow Gauge Railroad (NCNGRR) from 1901 to 1913. She was the first female railroad president in the world.

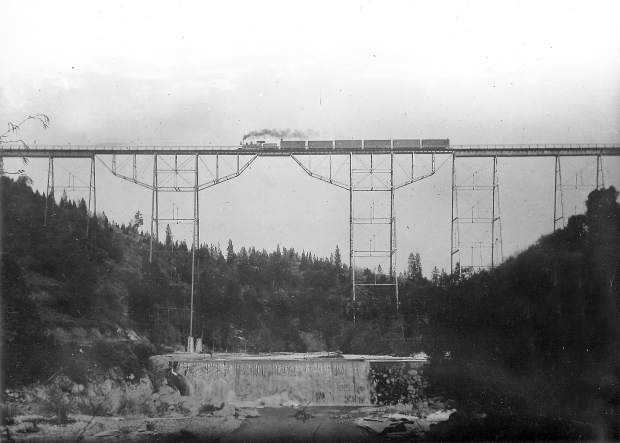
Bear River Bridge, built under Kidder's management

== Railroad presidency ==
Kidder became majority owner and president of the NCNGRR upon the death of her husband in 1901. Under her management, she was able to retire the company's debt and return dividends to the shareholders. During this period the railroad also built the Bear River Bridge, which was at the time the tallest in California. It cut two miles, and eight minutes, from the length of the trip between the two ends of the railroad.

In 1913, shortly after settling a legal challenge to her ownership of the railroad, she sold her stock and moved to San Francisco.

== Personal life ==
Born Sarah A. Clark in Ohio, Kidder married civil engineer John Flint Kidder in 1874. (Note: True West says the couple "were married in 1870". The date follows the contemporary obituary.) The couple soon settled in Grass Valley, California. Their home was a large mansion (sources disagree on eighteen or twenty-eight rooms), adjacent to the railroad tracks. She hosted social gatherings and also did volunteer work for an orphan society.

Her adopted daughter, Beatrice, married Harvard University graduate Howard Ridgely Ward, and had three children.

Kidder remained in San Francisco after selling the railroad, and died there in 1933, at the age 94. She is interred at the Odd Fellow's Columbarium.

== Honors ==
In honor of Sarah, John, and Beatrice Kidder, the Ancient and Honorable Order of E Clampus Vitus planted three trees in Grass Valley's Clamper Square. Two other plaques mentioning Kidder have also been placed at either end of the railroad.

The Nevada County Narrow Gauge Railroad Museum's railbus is named after Kidder.

== Further references ==
- Levinson, Nancy Smiler (1997). "Sarah Clark Kidder: Short Line Railroad President". She's Been Working on the Railroad. Lodestar Books. ISBN 9780525675457.
- Wyckoff, Robert M., ed. (1986). Never Come, Never Go! The Story of Nevada County's Narrow Gauge Railroad. Nevada City Publishing Company. ISBN 0961526106.

Preceded by John Flint Kidder	President of Nevada County Narrow Gauge Railroad; 1901 – 1913	Succeeded by
