= John Flint Kidder =

American politician

- (undated)
- Born: 1830; New York City, New York
- Died: April 10, 1901 (aged 70–71); Grass Valley, California
- Spouse: Sarah Kidder (m. 1874)
- Engineering career
- Discipline: Civil engineer
- Institutions: Officer of the Nevada Territorial Legislature; Debris Commissioner of the California State Mining Bureau
- Projects: Oregon and California Railroad, Monterey and Salinas Valley Railroad, Nevada County Narrow Gauge Railroad

John Flint Kidder (1830 – April 10, 1901) was a politician, civil engineer and railroad executive who built and later owned Northern California's Nevada County Narrow Gauge Railroad (NCNGRR) which, during its operation, never experienced an attempted robbery.

== Early life and education ==
Kidder's ancestors came to America before the American Revolution. He was born in New York City, New York in 1830, and moved in 1840 to Syracuse, New York with his parents.

Kidder attended Rensselaer Polytechnic Institute in 1846-47, but did not graduate.

== Career ==
Kidder began his engineering career in 1849. For several years, until 1860, he was a city engineer in Syracuse.

In 1861, he headed west for Government service, becoming an officer of the Nevada Territorial Legislature in which he surveyed the boundary from Lake Bigler to Honey Lake, followed by a survey south of Lake Bigler the following year. On July 8, 1862, the Governor appointed Kidder as Surveyor of Esmeralda County, Nevada.

In 1863, the Houghton-Ives Commission hired Kidder to survey the California/Nevada state line with Kidder representing the interests of California. On April 4, 1864, he was appointed County Surveyor of Nye County, Nevada, a position he held until September when an elected official took over the position.

He moved to El Dorado County, California in 1864, remaining for four years. While there, he served as a Member of California's 15th State Assembly district during the period of 1865-1867. After El Dorado County, he lived jointly in Sacramento and Nevada until 1868 when he moved to Oregon, and in 1871, he moved to Washington Territory. From 1873-1875, he lived in Solano County, California and Monterey County, California, and in 1875, moved to Grass Valley, California.

Kidder took over as building engineer of the Oregon and California Railroad, completing it on Christmas Eve, 1869. He also supervised the building of a portion of the Central Pacific Railway, and served as the Central Pacific's location engineer. In 1874, he was the building engineer on the Monterey and Salinas Valley Rail Road, the first narrow gauge railway in California.

Later in the same year, he became chief engineer to construct the NCNGRR from Nevada City, California, through Grass Valley, to Colfax, California where it connected with the Central Pacific Railway. Construction was completed in 1876 and Kidder became the railroad's General Superintendent by 1877. He went on to become the railroad's President in 1884, along with Secretary, Treasurer, and made his family the Board of Directors.

He owned four mines, and was a multi-millionaire.

Kidder, a Republican, was involved in State and County Central Committees. He was a delegate to the 1892 Republican National Convention, where he cast the only vote for Ohio's William McKinley, the Permanent Chair of the convention.

Governor Robert Waterman appointed Kidder to the position of Yosemite Valley Commissioner. In 1893, Kidder was appointed State Debris Commissioner by the California State Mining Bureau, a position he held until his death.

Though Kidder became the first Exalted Ruler of the Grass Valley Elks Club in 1900, he continued his membership in Syracuse's Masonic Lodge even after leaving 40 years earlier.

== Personal life ==
Kidder married Sarah A. Clark of Ohio in 1874. From 1875, they lived on Bennett Street in Grass Valley where he collected paintings and a large collection of books. He had a family orchard across from the Grass Valley train depot where he grew a variety of produce.

Kidder and his wife had one adopted daughter, Beatrice, who married Howard Ridgely Ward in Grass Valley in 1905. The Wards had two children both daughters, Elizabeth K. Ward born in about 1907 and Beatrice H. Ward born in about 1908 but died sometime between 1910 and 1917.

== Death and legacy ==
In April 1901, suffering from diabetes, Kidder died at his home in Grass Valley. His wife, Sarah, succeeded him as President of the NNGRR, becoming the first female railroad president in the world.

Honoring Kidder, who built Grass Valley's first modern house and first concrete sidewalk, the Ancient and Honorable Order of E Clampus Vitus planted three trees for the Kidder family in Grass Valley's Clamper Square.

Preceded by John C. Coleman	President, Nevada County Narrow Gauge Railroad; 1884 – 1901	Succeeded by Sarah Kidder
