= D. L. Bliss State Park =

State park in California, United States

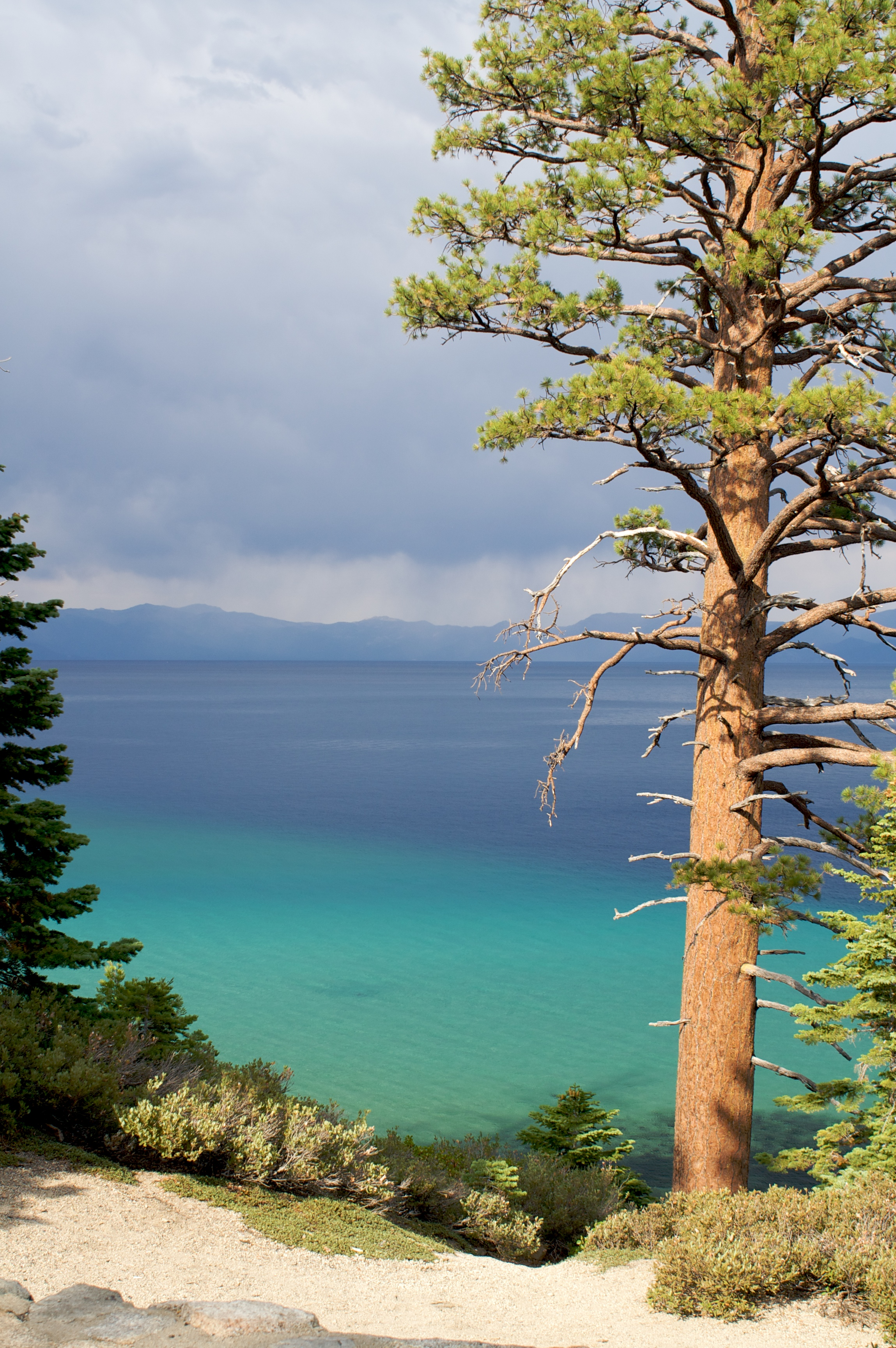

- Location within California Location within the United States
- Location: El Dorado County, California, United States
- Nearest city: Tahoma, California
- Coordinates: 38°58′53″N 120°6′2″W
- Area: 2,149 acres (8.70 km^{2})
- Established: 1929
- Governing body: California Department of Parks and Recreation

D. L. Bliss State Park is a state park of California in the United States. It is located on the western shore of Lake Tahoe just north of Emerald Bay State Park.

Notable features include Rubicon Point Light, the second-highest-elevation lighthouse in the United States. A popular trail in the lakeside forest features a large balancing rock.

The park is named in honor of timber and railroad magnate Duane Leroy Bliss, whose heirs donated 744 acres (301 ha) of land to the state in 1929. It has since grown to 2,149 acres (870 ha).

== See also ==
- List of California state parks
