= Wabuska station =

- Wabuska Railroad Station
- U.S. National Register of Historic Places
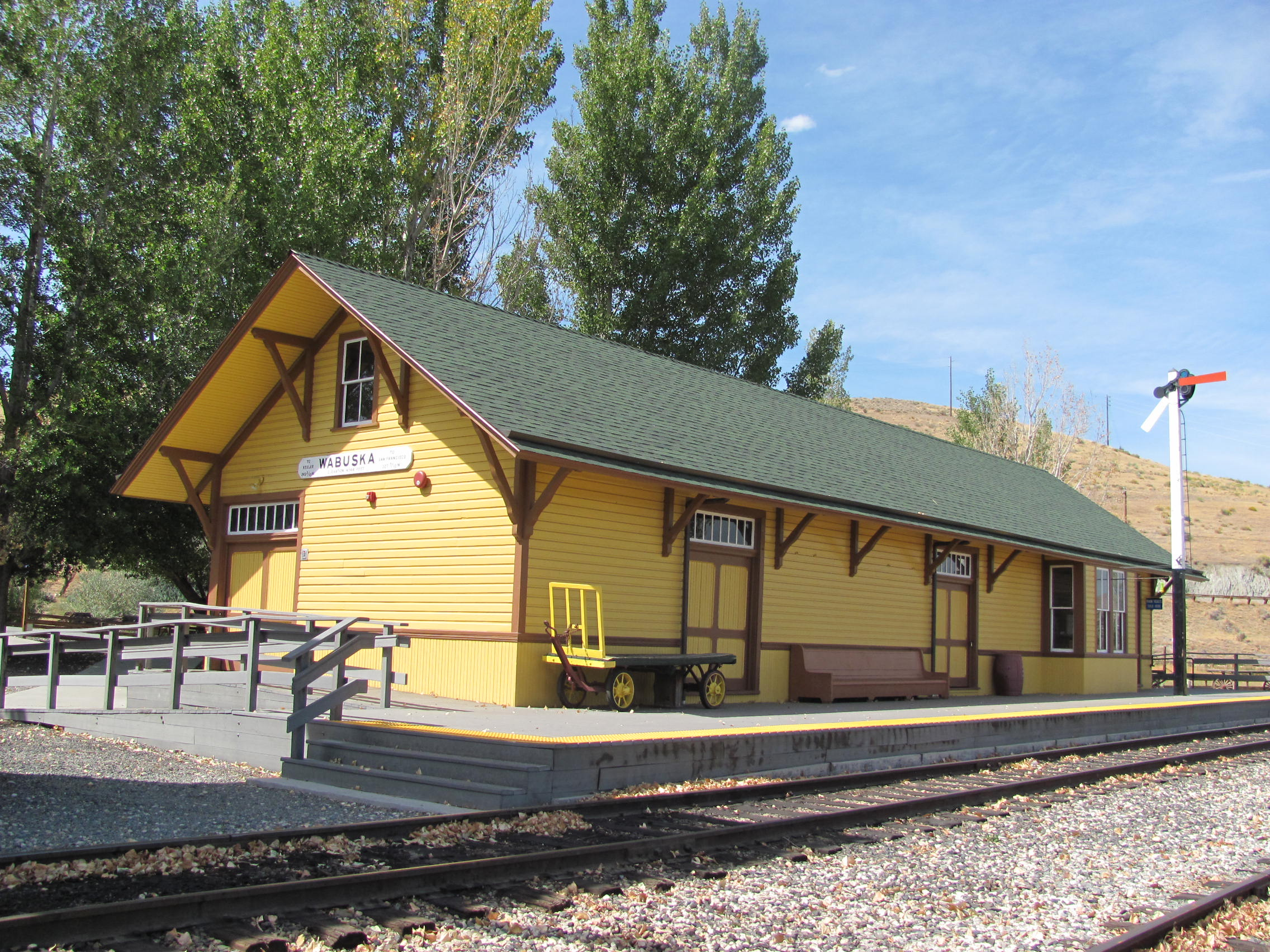
- Station in 2012

- Location within Nevada Location within the United States
- Location: S. Carson St., Carson City, Nevada
- Coordinates: 39°9′0″N 119°46′0″W
- Area: 0.1 acres (0.040 ha)
- Built: 1906
- Architect: Southern Pacific Co.
- NRHP reference No.: 84002070
- Added to NRHP: August 30, 1984

The Wabuska Railroad Station, on South Carson Street in Carson City, Nevada, was built in 1906. It was a work of the Southern Pacific Co. It was listed on the National Register of Historic Places in 1984.

It is a 24-by-80-foot (7.3 m × 24.4 m) building that was located in the small community of Wabuska, Nevada, in Mason Valley, on the Southern Pacific Railroad branch line between Hazen, Nevada and Mina, Nevada. The Wabuska Hotel and Bar (c. 1883) was nearby.

It was donated by the Southern Pacific Transportation Company in 1982 to the Nevada State Railroad Museum and was moved in 1983. In 1984, the station was weathered but appeared in good condition structurally; photos in 2012 show that it has been improved.

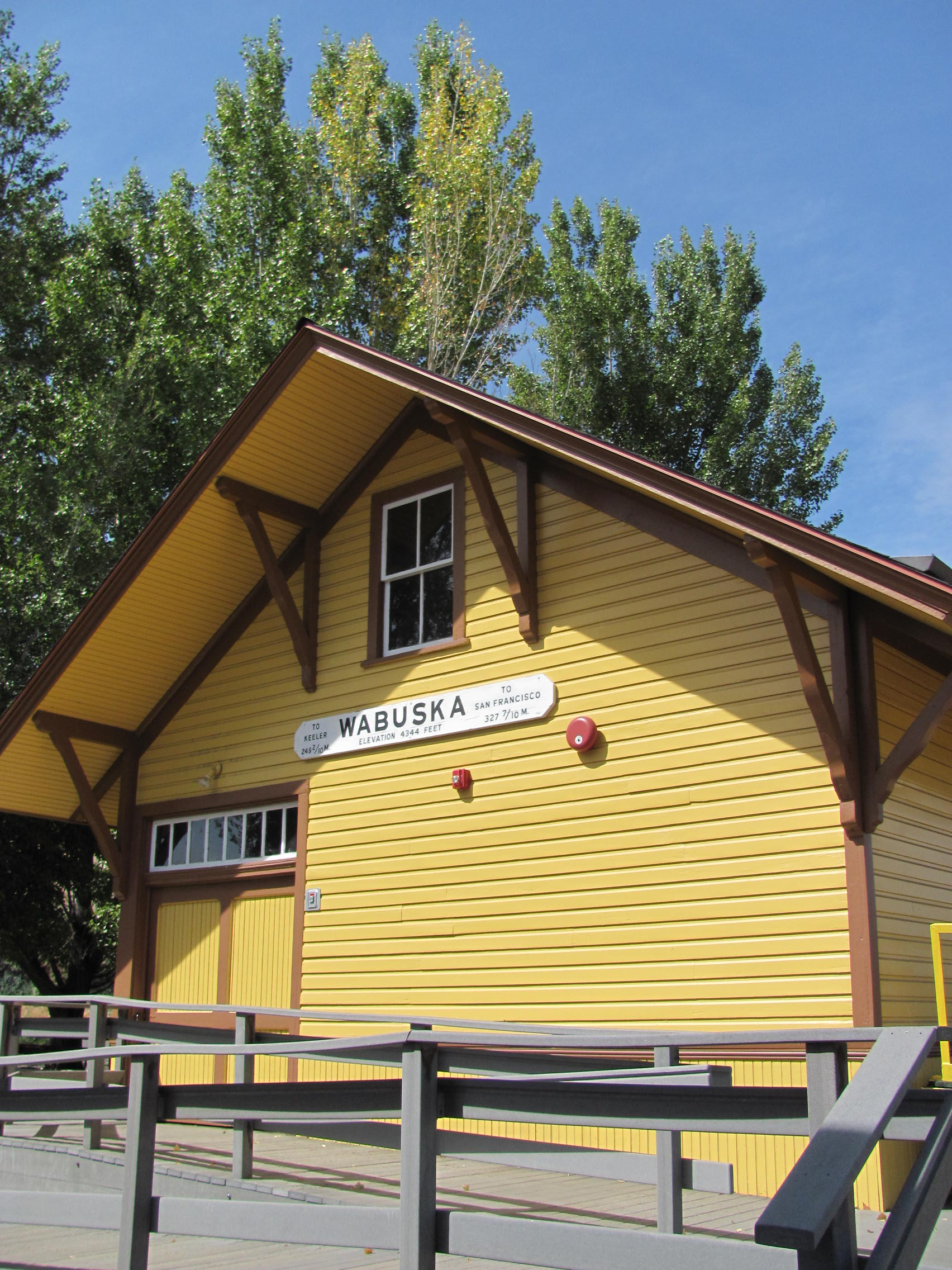
Detail of the siding and construction

Preceding station	Southern Pacific Railroad	Following station
Churchill toward Hazen	Hazen – Mina	Lux toward Mina
