= Nevada State Railroad Museum =

Museum in Carson City, Nevada

Coordinates: 39°9′0″N 119°46′2″W

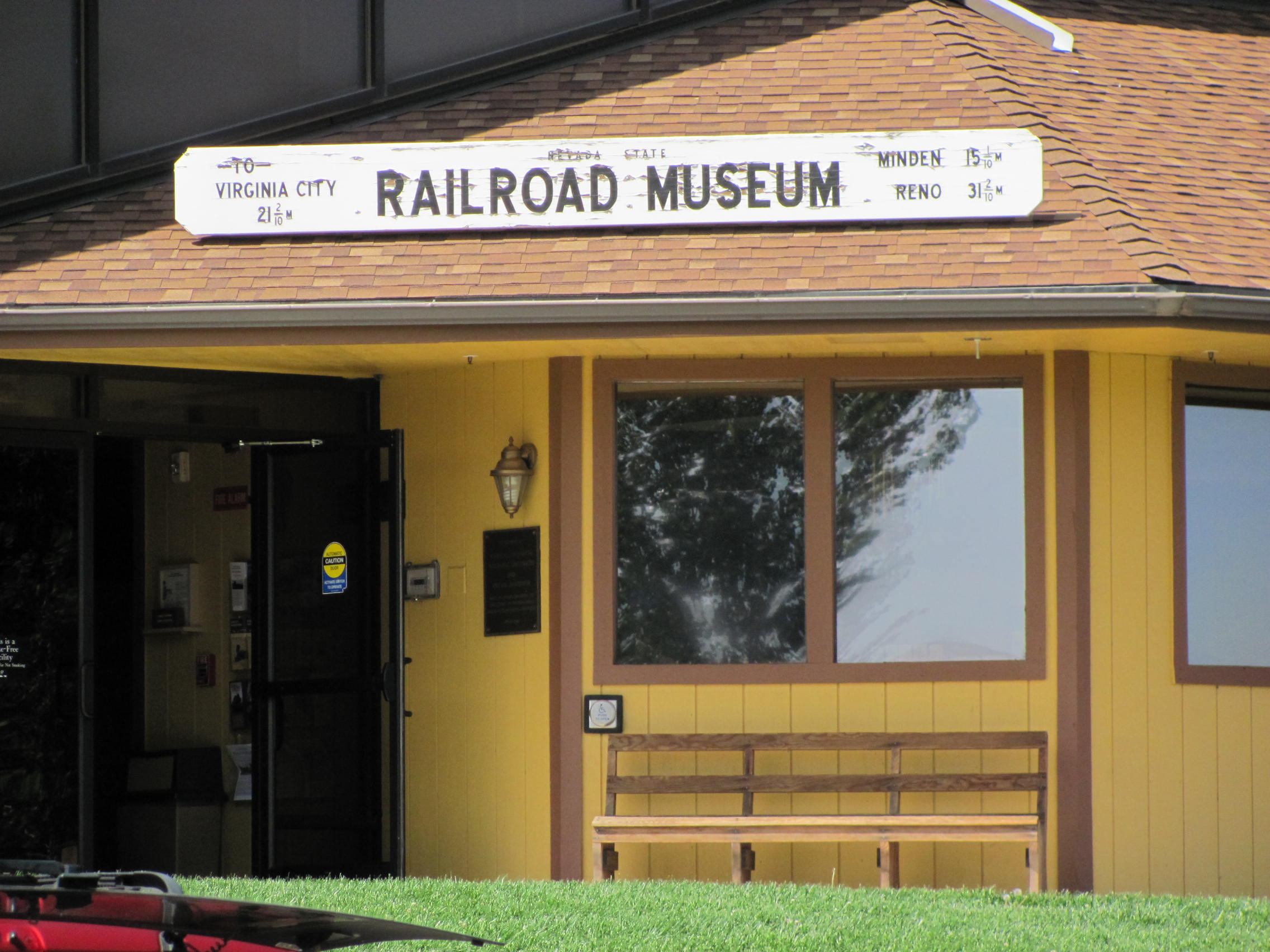
- The entrance to the main building

Overview
- Headquarters: Carson City, Nevada
- Reporting mark: NSRM
- Locale: Carson City, Nevada
- Dates of operation: 1980–present

Technical
- Track gauge: 4 ft 8 1/2 in (1,435 mm) standard gauge
- Length: 4.8 mi (7.7 km)

The Nevada State Railroad Museum, located in Carson City, Nevada, preserves the railroad heritage of Nevada, including locomotives and cars of the famous Virginia and Truckee Railroad. Much of the museum equipment was obtained from various Hollywood studios, where they were used in movies and television. The museum is operated by the Nevada Department of Tourism and Cultural Affairs. Opened in 1980, it was originally named the Virginia & Truckee Railroad Museum, often shortened to V&T Railroad Museum, but was renamed the Nevada State Railroad Museum in 1985.

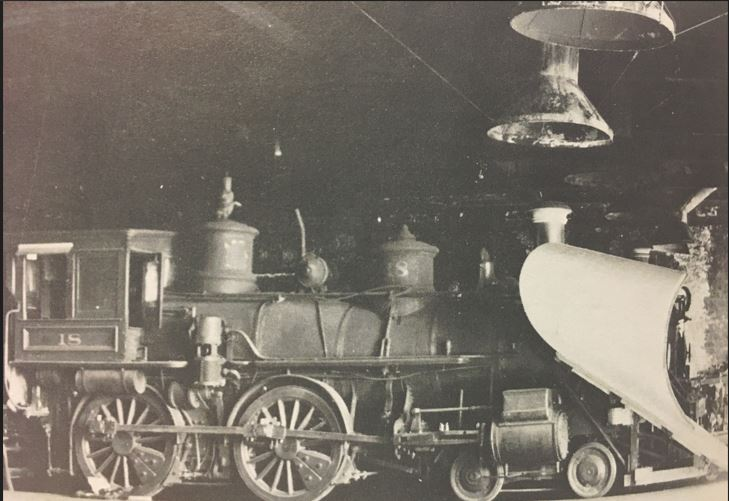
Virginia & Truckee RR 18, the "Dayton," in its 20th-century configuration (e.g., straight stack, round headlight, etc.), before restoration.

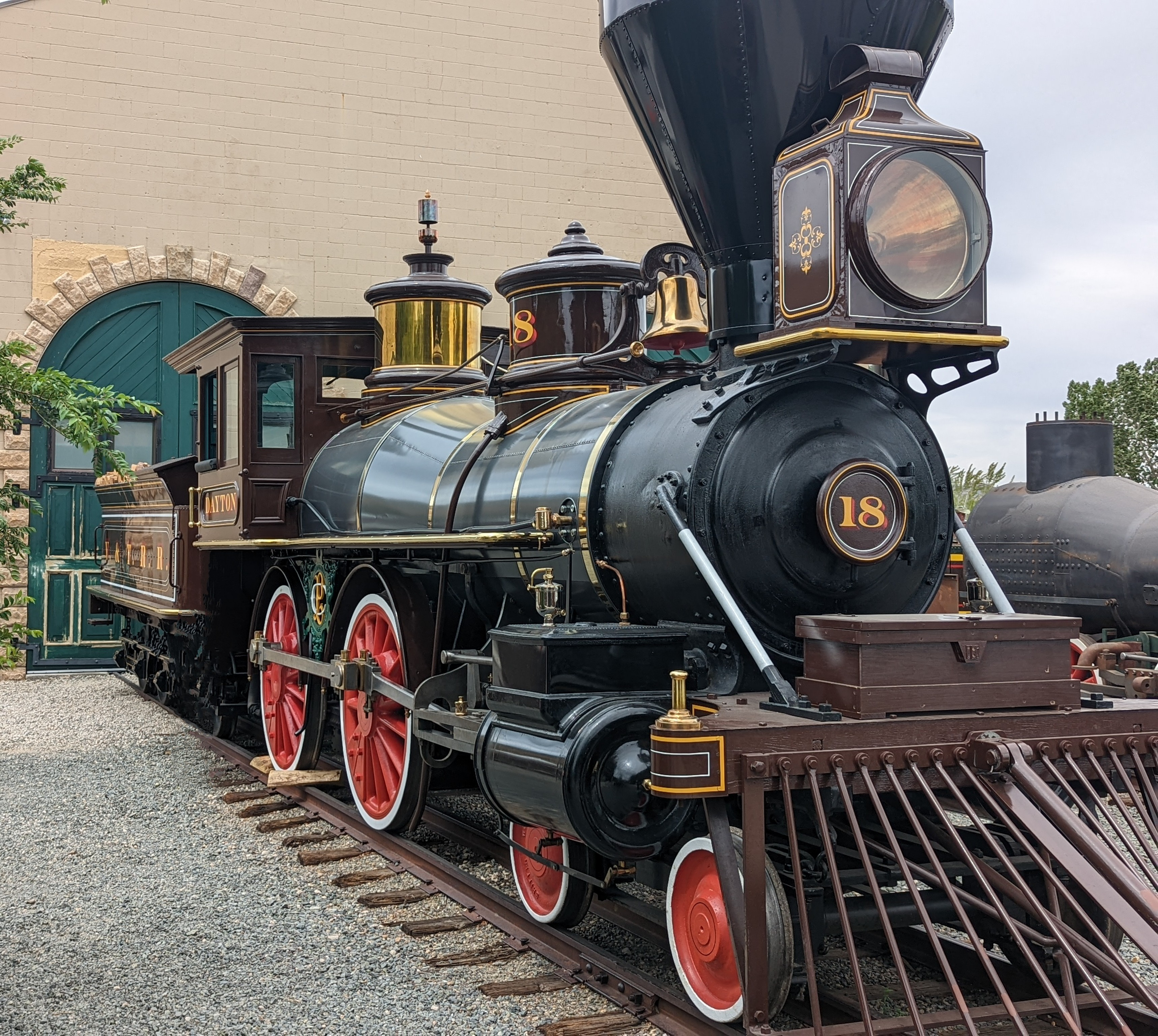
Virginia & Truckee 18, the "Dayton," (which was built in 1873) after its restoration, which incorporated many of its 1800s design features.

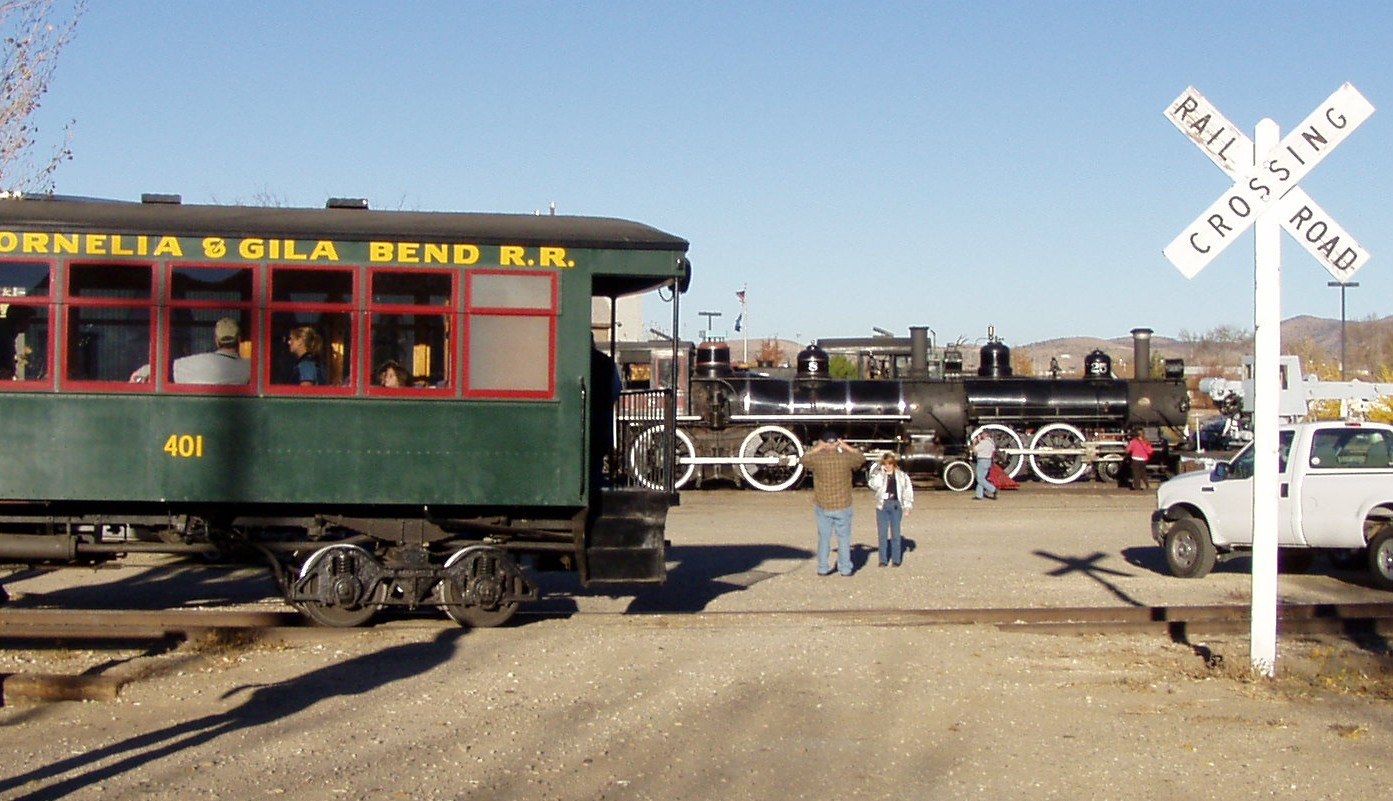
The museum collection includes a variety of local historic passenger and freight equipment

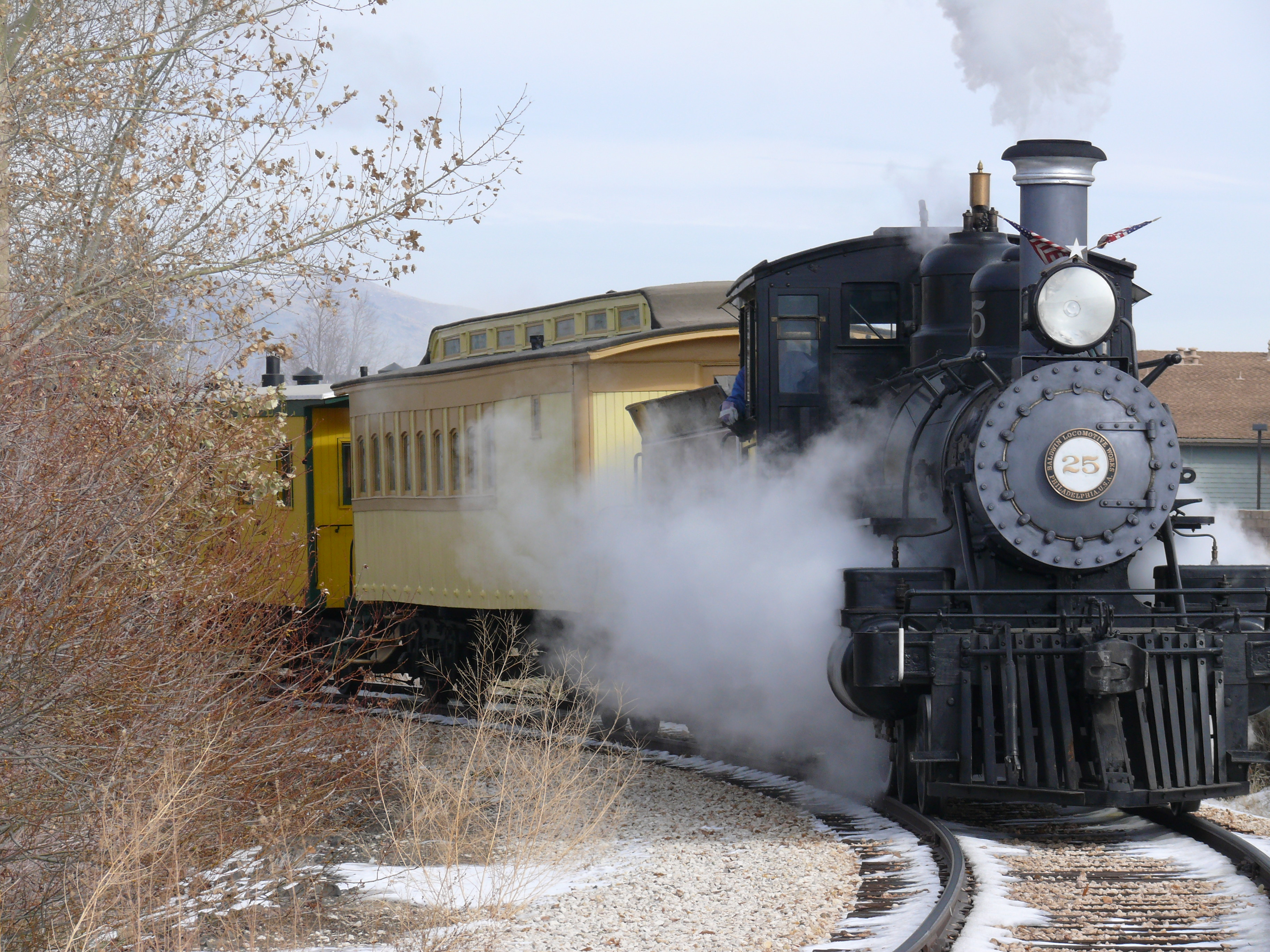
A tourist train operating at the museum

Museum activities consist of operation of historic 4 ft 8 1/2 in (1,435 mm) standard gauge and 3 ft (914 mm) narrow gauge railroad equipment, including train rides, handcar rides, lectures, an annual railroad history symposium, changing exhibits, and a variety of special events. The Museum also has an ongoing research and restoration program. The museum's current exhibit commemorates the 150th anniversary of the completion of the First transcontinental railroad, featuring V&T Coach No. 17, which was originally built for the Central Pacific Railroad and had carried Leland Stanford to the Golden spike ceremony at Promontory Summit, Utah. The Wabuska station, a historic station from Wabuska, Nevada was relocated to the museum grounds. The building is still used as a working railroad station where tickets for the museum train rides are purchased.

== Collection ==
=== Standard gauge steam locomotives ===
Locomotive	Image	Type	Built	Retired	Acquired	Notes	Notes
Dardanelle & Russellville #8		4-4-0 "American"	Cooke Locomotive & Machine Co. 1888	1945	1987	Stored, awaiting restoration	
Virginia & Truckee #1 "Lyon"		2-6-0 "Mogul"	Original: H.J. Booth 1869 - Replica: Stan Gentry/NSRM 1995 -		2019	Under construction	
Virginia & Truckee #12 "Genoa"		4-4-0 "American"	Baldwin 1873	1908	2022	Display	On 2 year loan from CSRM
Virginia & Truckee #18 "Dayton"		4-4-0 "American"	CP's Sacramento shops 1873	1938	1978	Display	On 2 year loan to CSRM
Virginia & Truckee #21 "J. W. Bowker"		2-4-0 "Porter"	Baldwin 1875	1917	2022	Display	On 2 year loan from CSRM
Virginia & Truckee #22 "Inyo"		4-4-0 "American"	Baldwin 1875	1926	1978	Under rebuild	
Virginia & Truckee #25		4-6-0 "Ten-Wheeler	Baldwin 1905	1955	1971	Operational	
Virginia and Truckee Railroad Engine No. 27		4-6-0 "Ten-Wheeler	Baldwin 1913	1948	1993	Display	on loan to Comstock History Center

=== Narrow gauge steam locomotives ===
Locomotive	Images	Type	Built	Retired	Acquired	Notes	Notes
Carson & Tahoe Lumber & Fluming #1 "Glenbrook"		2-6-0 "Mogul"	Baldwin 1875	1937	1981	Operational	
Dayton, Sutro & Carson Valley #1 "Joe Douglass"		0-4-2 "Olomana"	Porter 1882	1904	1994	Static display	
Southern Pacific #8		4-6-0 "Ten-Wheeler"	Baldwin 1907	1955	1975	Static display, on loan to Sparks, NV	

=== Motor locomotives ===
Locomotive	Images	Type	Built	Retired	Acquired	Notes	Notes
NSRM #99 "Dinky"		Davenport 7-Ton	1924	1988	1988	Operational	
Tidewater Oil Co. #1005		Fate-Root-Heath	1944			Operational	

=== Motorcars ===
Locomotive	Images	Type	Built	Retired	Acquired	Notes	Notes
Chicago Great Western #1000		McKeen Motor Car	1910	1964		Parts Donor	
Nevada Copper Belt #22		Hall Scott Motor Car	1914	1947	1996	Body Only	
Tucson Cornelia & Gila Bend #401		Edwards Motor Car	1926	1955	1988	Operational	
Virginia & Truckee #22		McKeen Motor Car	1910	1945	1996	Operational	
Virginia & Truckee #99		Thomson-Graf-Elder	1921	1941	1980	Parts Only	

== See also ==
- Nevada State Railroad Museum Boulder City – a museum located in Boulder City, Nevada.
