= Carson and Tahoe Lumber and Fluming Company =

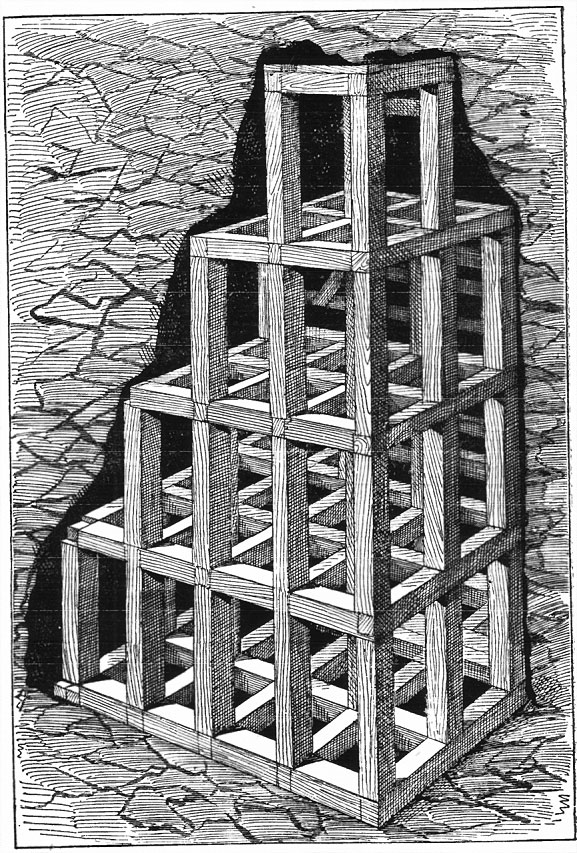
Square set timbering as used in the Comstock mines required a large quantity of lumber.

The Carson and Tahoe Lumber and Fluming Company (C&TL&F) was formed to move lumber from trees growing along the shore of Lake Tahoe to the silver mines of the Comstock Lode. Between 1872 and 1898 C&TL&F transferred 750 million board foot of lumber logged from 80,000 acres (32,000 ha) of virgin timberland.

== Origins ==
Augustus Pray moved to Glenbrook, Nevada on the shore of Lake Tahoe in 1860. In 1863 he had two steam engines delivered. He used the first to build a sawmill at Glenbrook; and the second was used to power the 42-foot (13 m) paddle wheel tugboat Governor Blasdel built with some of the lumber he milled from nearby forests. The tugboat was then used to tow rafts of logs to his sawmill from more distant shores of Lake Tahoe. Lumber was in great demand on the opposite side of the ridge separating Lake Tahoe from the silver mines to the east. Aside from the need for homes to shelter the miners and associated commercial enterprises, the silver ore deposit required large quantities of lumber for a newly designed square set timbering structure to prevent collapse of weak rock overlying the ore body. The 40-foot (12 m) Truckee and 55-foot (17 m) propeller-driven Emerald began towing log rafts to Glenbrook in 1870. Duane Leroy Bliss formed C&TL&F in 1872 to build a narrow-gauge railway up the hill from the sawmill at Glenbrook to Spooner Summit, and to purchase the Marlette Lake Water System with a wooden flume to float the lumber 12 miles (19 km) from the summit dropping 2,300 feet (700 m) to the Virginia and Truckee Railroad at Carson City, Nevada.

== Lake Tahoe Railroad ==
Lake Tahoe Railroad
Overview
- Headquarters: Glenbrook, Nevada
- Locale: Douglas County, Nevada
- Dates of operation: 1875–1898
- Successor: abandoned

Technical
- Track gauge: 3 ft (914 mm)
- Length: 8.75 mi (14.08 km)

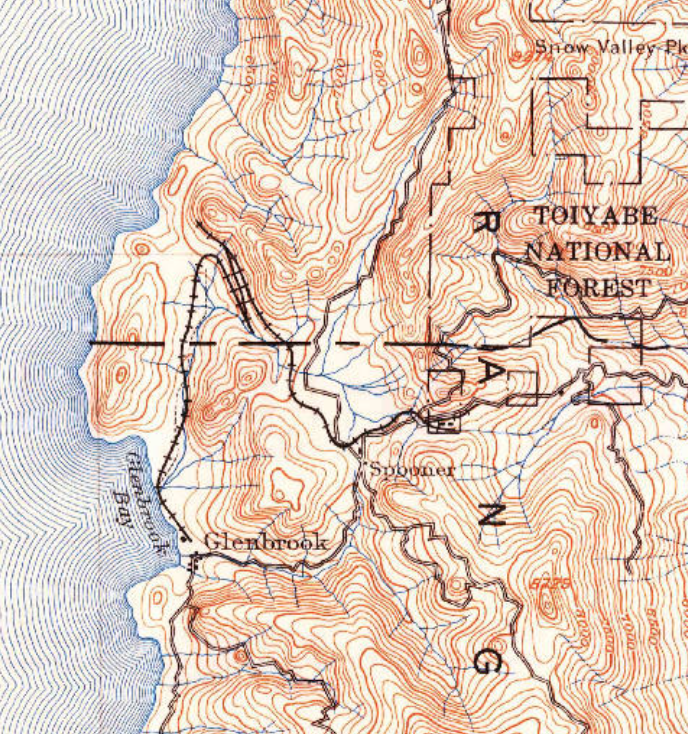
Lake Tahoe line in 1893

The V-shaped flume built by the Summit Fluming Company in 1869 was purchased first, and lumber moved uphill in wagons until the 8.75-mile (14.08 km) Lake Tahoe Railroad was built in 1875 to carry production from two more sawmills C&TL&F built at Glenbrook in 1873 and 1875. The route climbed 910 feet (280 m) following North Canyon Creek and required two switchbacks to reach the 7,146 feet (2,178 m) summit at an average grade of 2.44 percent with some as steep as 4 percent. Baldwin Locomotive Works built two 2-6-0 locomotives named Tahoe and Glenbrook. Either locomotive could pull six flatcars of lumber to the summit, and trains sometimes used twelve cars with one locomotive pulling and the other pushing. By 1877 the railroad had 75 flatcars; and a third similar locomotive was built that year to move the desired volume of lumber when one of the locomotives required repairs. Railroad and flume operations were coordinated by installation of one of the first telephone systems in the west between Glenbrook and Carson City. As additional log raft towing capacity was required, C&TL&F purchased the 75-foot (23 m) Meteor in 1876 the 60-foot (18 m) Emerald (II) in 1887. C&TL&F's second Glendale sawmill burned in 1887; so their remaining Rigby sawmill shifted to 24-hour operation to sustain lumber production.

== Lake Valley Railroad ==
Lake Valley Railroad
Overview
- Headquarters: Glenbrook, Nevada
- Locale: El Dorado County, California
- Dates of operation: 1884–1898
- Successor: abandoned

Technical
- Track gauge: 3 ft (914 mm)
- Length: 11 mi (18 km)

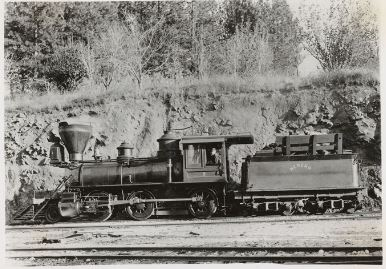
The engine that became Nevada County Narrow Gauge RR #5 still exists and is at the Nevada County Narrow Gauge Railroad Museum in Nevada City, California (Bancroft Library, UC Berkeley collection)

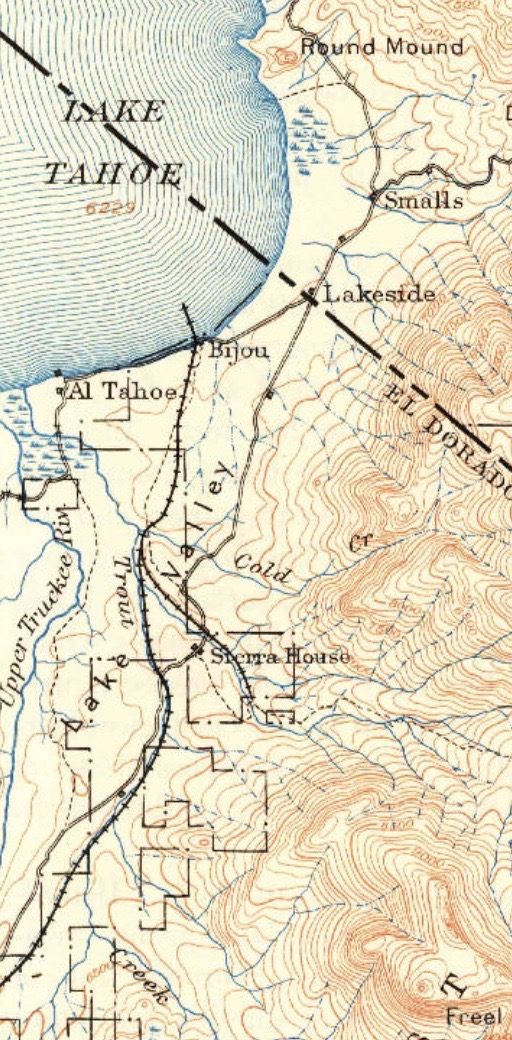
Lake Valley RR route in 1893

In 1886 C&TL&F purchased George Chubbuck's Lake Valley Railroad south from Bijou, California up to Meyers, California. The railroad brought logs down to Lake Tahoe, where C&TL&F steamboats would tow them to the Glendale sawmills. The Lake Valley Railroad initially used 6-inch (15 cm) square timbers as wooden rails for a primitive locomotive fabricated by Vulcan Iron Works of San Francisco. The locomotive was used as a stationary steam donkey after it destroyed the wooden rails; so Chubbuck laid conventional 35-pound rails and purchased the narrow-gauge 0-6-0 used for construction of the Nevada-California-Oregon Railway. C&TL&F sent one of their Lake Tahoe Railroad locomotives over to assist the Porter locomotive built in 1875 after they purchased the line. Both locomotives were sold to the Nevada County Narrow Gauge Railroad when the Lake Valley Railroad was dismantled in 1898.

== Lake Tahoe Railway and Transportation Company ==
Demand for lumber declined as Comstock Lode ore depletion became evident. Bliss shifted his attention to building a steamboat landing at Tahoe City, California for his Tahoe Tavern resort. Bliss formed the Lake Tahoe Railway and Transportation Company in 1895 to launch the 200-passenger Tahoe in 1896 and acquire the rebuilt passenger steamer Nevada. When transfer of lumber over the C&TL&F flume ended in 1898, the Lake Tahoe Railroad was dismantled and shipped across Lake Tahoe to be reassembled in 1899 as a 16-mile (26 km) tourist railroad connecting Tahoe City to the Southern Pacific Railroad at Truckee, California.
