= Bijou, California =

Bijou
- Former unincorporated community District of South Lake Tahoe
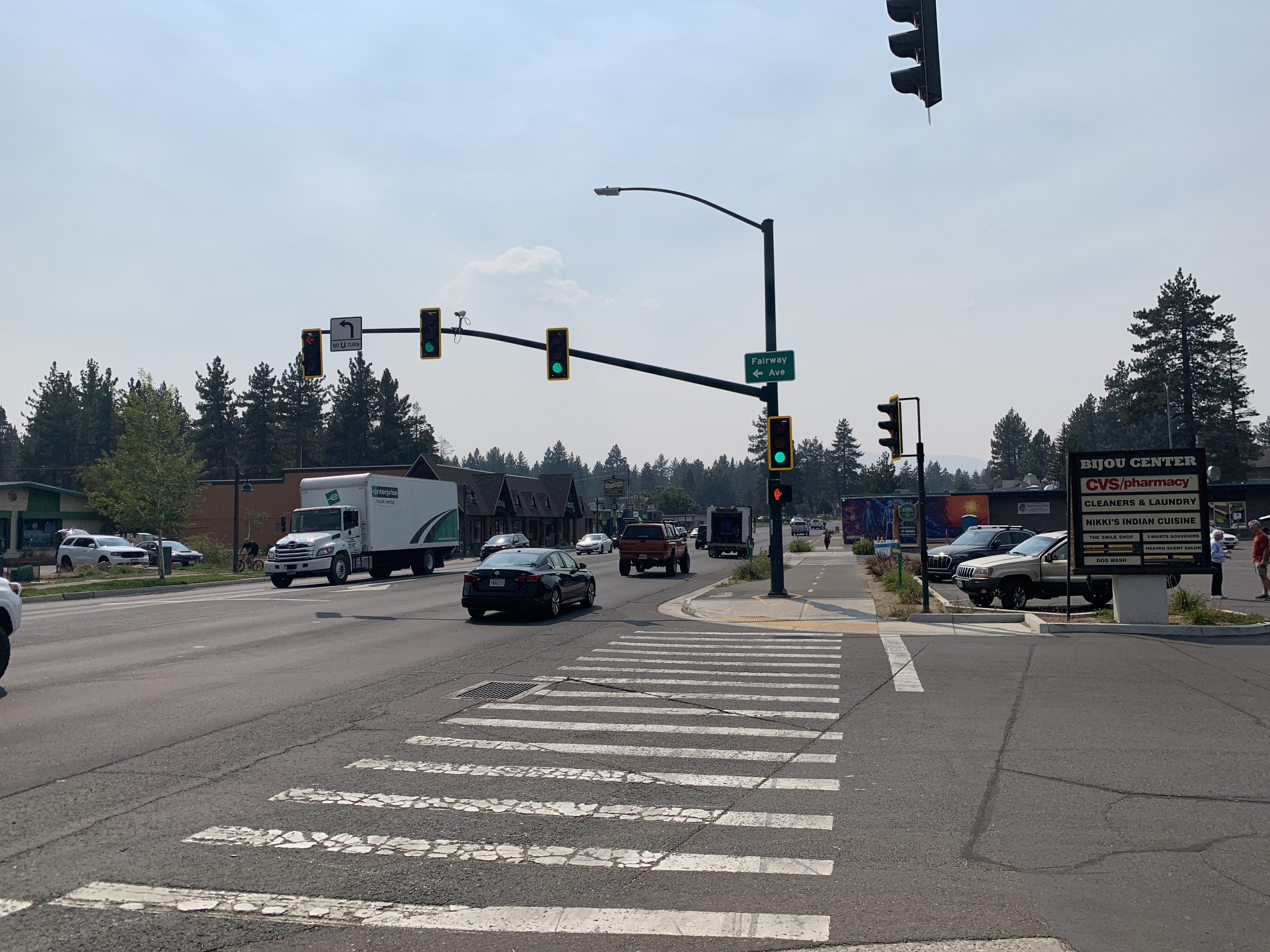

- Location in California
- Coordinates: 38°56′48″N 119°58′07″W
- Country: United States
- State: California
- County: El Dorado County
- City: South Lake Tahoe
- Elevation: 6,243 ft (1,903 m)

Bijou (formerly, Taylors Landing and Taylor's Landing) is a former unincorporated community now incorporated in South Lake Tahoe in El Dorado County, California. It lies at an elevation of 6243 feet (1903 m).

The place was founded in 1864 by Almon M. Taylor, after whom it was named. The name was changed to Bijou with the arrival of the post office in 1888. The post office operated until 1967. The Lake Valley Railroad ran from Meyers down Lake Valley and terminated at a pier in Bijou.
