= Lucia Smith Carpenter Bliss =

American botanical artist (1823–1912)

- Born: 1823; Rehoboth, Massachusetts
- Died: 1912 (aged 88–89); Boston, Massachusetts

Lucia Smith Carpenter Bliss (1823–1912) was an American botanical artist. She was born in Rehoboth, Massachusetts. She exhibited her work at the 1876 Centennial Exposition in Philadelphia. She died in Jamaica Plain, Boston, Massachusetts. Her papers are in the Smithsonian Libraries and Archives' artists' files.

== Gallery ==
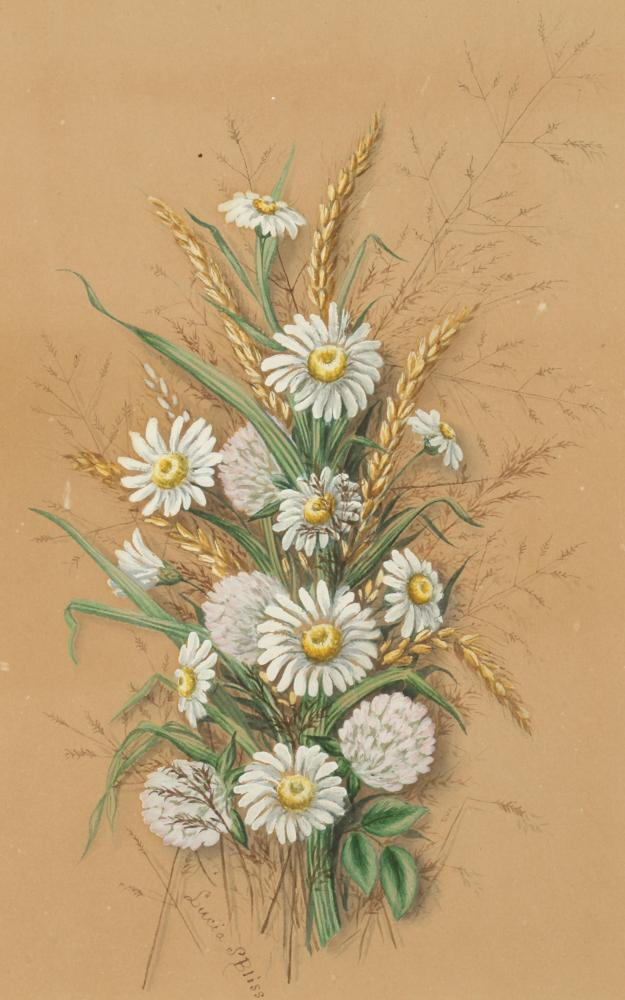
Bouquet of Wheat and Daisies

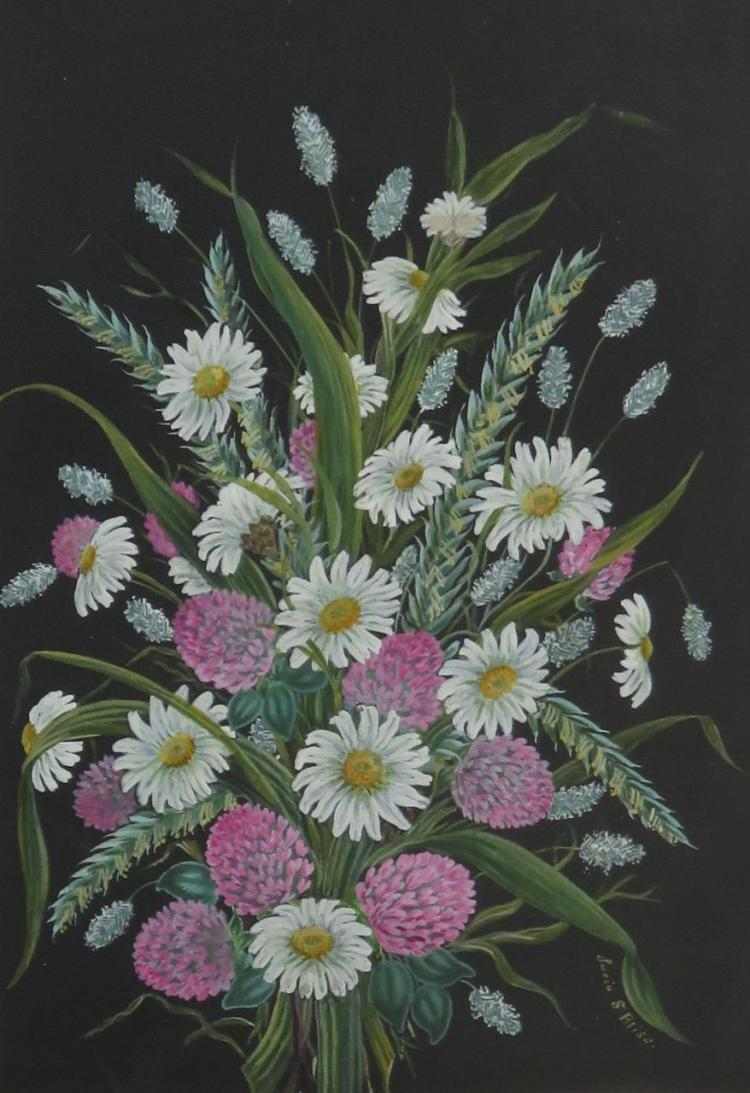
Floral Bouquet

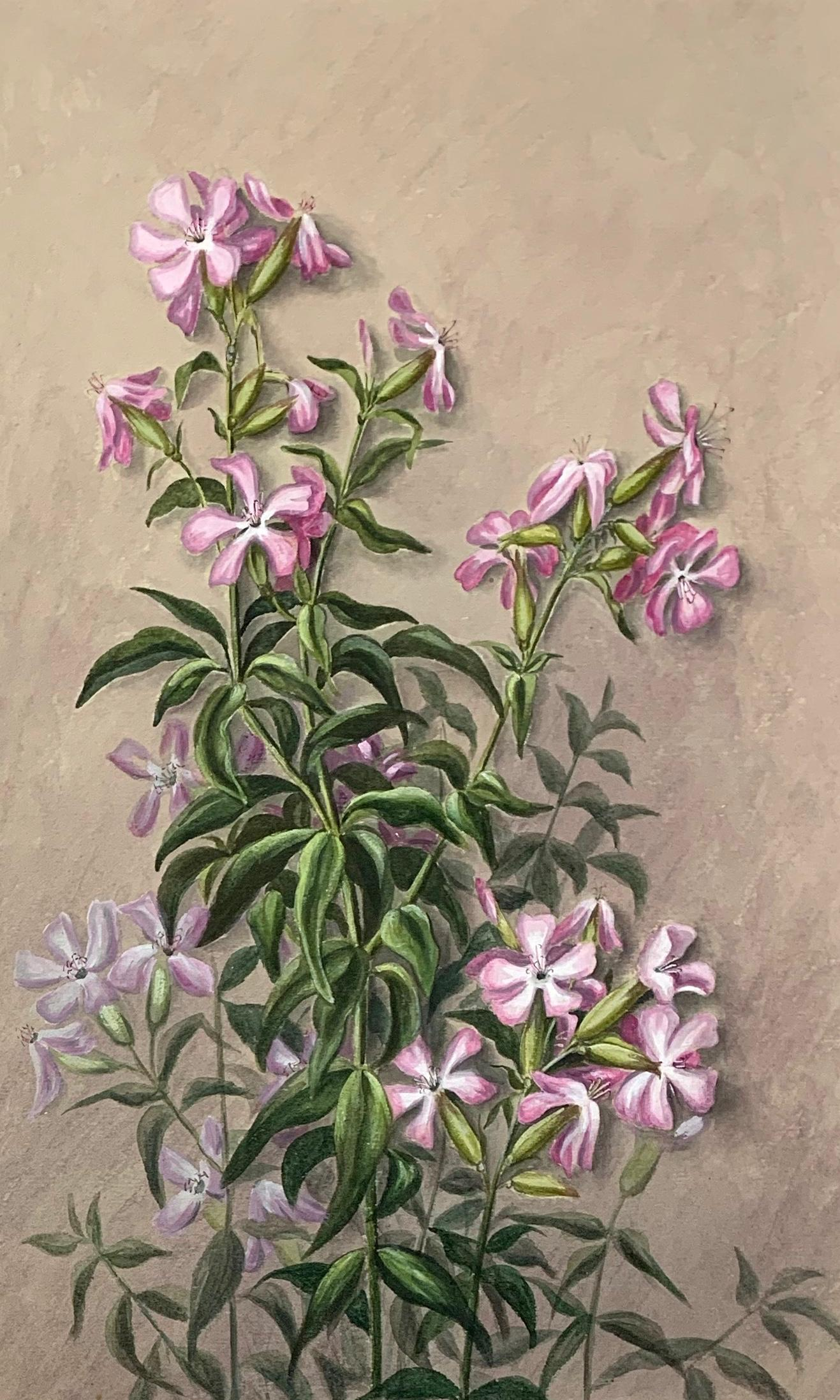
Flora
