= Lake Tahoe Railway and Transportation Company =

Overview
- Headquarters: Truckee, California
- Locale: Tahoe City, California
- Dates of operation: 1899–1925

Technical
- Track gauge: 4 ft 8 1/2 in (1,435 mm) standard gauge
- Previous gauge: 3 ft (914 mm) gauge

The Lake Tahoe Railway and Transportation Company was a 16-mile (26 km), 3 ft (914 mm) narrow gauge railroad that ran from the Central Pacific Railway at Truckee, California to the waterfront at Lake Tahoe. The railroad's width was converted to 4 ft 8 1/2 in (1,435 mm) standard gauge in 1926. The railroad operated its own property from 1899 until October 16, 1925, at which time it was leased to the Southern Pacific Company, which bought the property outright in May, 1933. SP abandoned the line in 1943.

The Lake Tahoe Railway and Transportation Company operated a narrow gauge railroad between Truckee and Lake Tahoe, California assembled from equipment formerly used on the Lake Tahoe Railroad of Glenbrook, Nevada (USA). A separate company known as the Lake Tahoe Railway (c. 1904) proposed to build a 65-mile (105 km) standard gauge line northeast from Placerville to Pino Grande and then Lake Tahoe but construction never commenced.

== Timeline ==
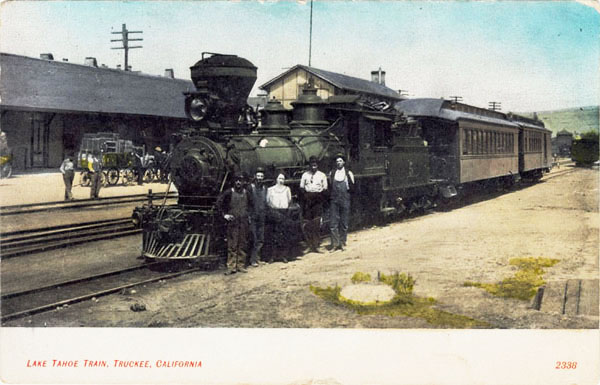
Train bound for Lake Tahoe in Truckee, California

- December 19, 1898 – Railway Incorporated
- May 1, 1900 – Operations commence between Truckee and Lake Tahoe
- October 16, 1925 – Railway leased to Southern Pacific Railroad
- May 15, 1926 – Line converted to Standard Gauge by SP
- May 1933 – Railway sold to SP
- November 10, 1943 – Line abandoned by SP

== Route ==
The railroad followed the Truckee River approximately via the modern route of State Route 89.

- Truckee - Interchange with Southern Pacific
- Deer Creek
- Squaw Valley
- Tahoe Wharf
- Tahoe City
- Tahoe Wharf

Ward Creek Branch

- Ward Creek

== Motive Power ==
The LT RR had four used 3 ft (914 mm) gauge Baldwin locomotives that operated on the line.

| LT&T Ry No. | Locomotive Type | Builder | Builder No. | Date Built | Acquired | Disposition |
|---|---|---|---|---|---|---|
| 1 | 2-6-0 | Baldwin | 3712 | April 1875 | January 31, 1899 from Carson and Tahoe Lumber and Fluming Company #1 | Restored in 2015, by the Nevada State Railroad Museum in Carson City |
| 3 | 2-6-0 | Baldwin | 4062 | April 1877 | January 31, 1899 from Carson and Tahoe Lumber and Fluming Company #3 | Scrapped in 1926 in Sacramento |
| 5 | 4-4-0 | Baldwin | 4222 | December 1877 | October 15, 1906 from South Pacific Coast Railroad #5 | Scrapped in 1926 in Sacramento |
| 13 | 2-8-0 | Baldwin | 6157 | April 1882 | August 13, 1915 from South Pacific Coast Railroad #13 | Scrapped in November 1927 in Sacramento |

== See also ==
- List of defunct California railroads
