= SS Tahoe =

Steamship scuttled in Lake Tahoe

Coordinates: 39°05.496′N 119°57.256′W

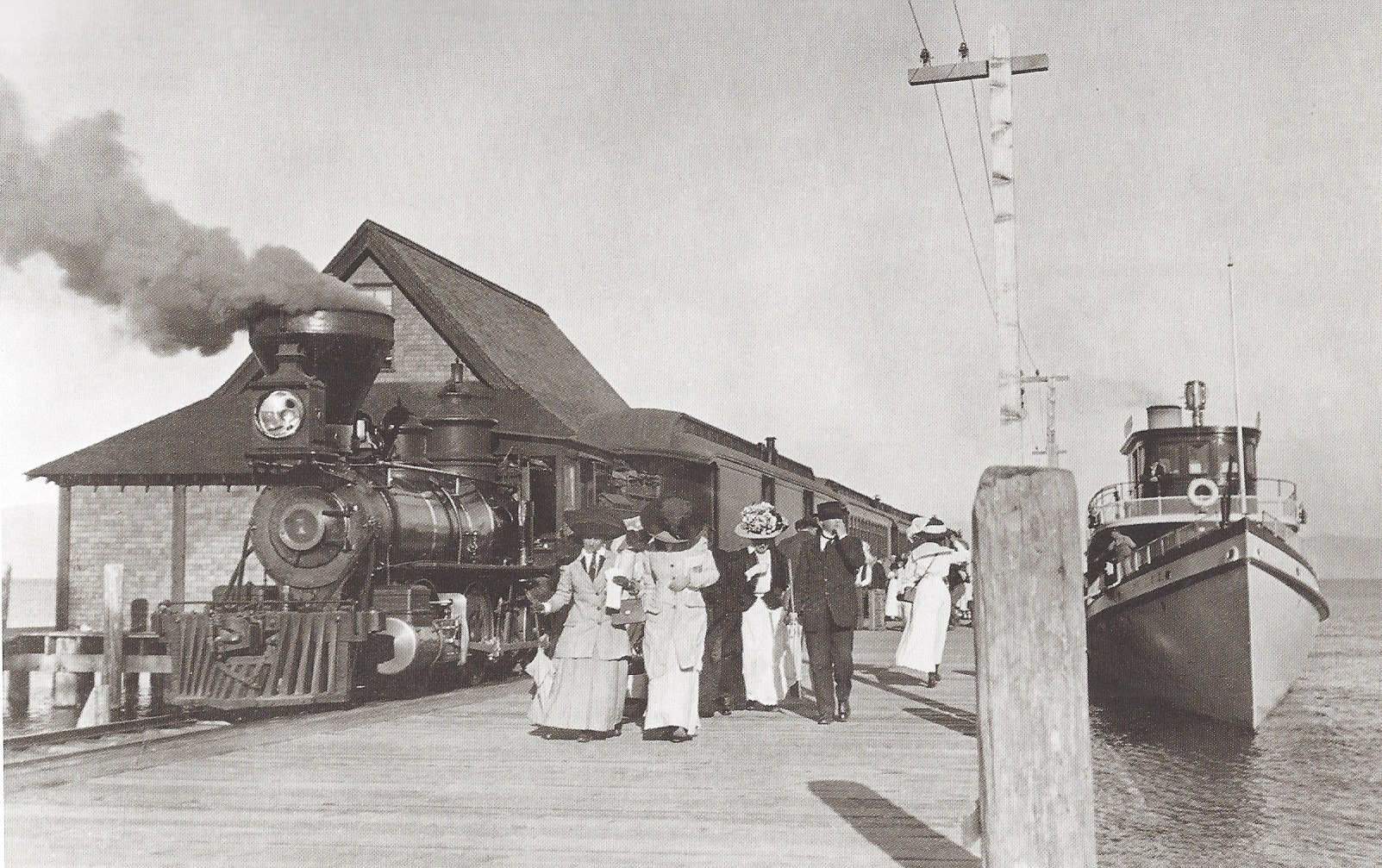
- Tahoe circa 1906

History
- Owner: Duane Leroy Bliss
- Builder: Union Iron Works
- Yard number: 42
- Launched: 24 June 1896
- Fate: Scuttled 1940

General characteristics
- Type: Steamship
- Displacement: 154 tons
- Length: 169 ft 9 in (51.74 m)
- Beam: 17 ft 10 in (5.44 m)
- Draft: 6 ft (1.8 m)
- Depth: 9 ft 10 1/2 in (3.010 m)
- Installed power: 2 × triple expansion steam engines 1,200 hp (890 kW) total
- Propulsion: Twin 4 ft 10 in (1.47 m) screws
- Speed: 18 1/2 knots (34.3 km/h; 21.3 mph)
- Capacity: 200 passengers
- SS Tahoe
- U.S. National Register of Historic Places
- Location: Lake Tahoe
- Nearest city: Glenbrook, Nevada
- NRHP reference No.: 04000026
- Added to NRHP: February 11, 2004

SS Tahoe was a steamship that operated on Lake Tahoe at the end of the 19th century and the first half of the 20th. Scuttled in 1940, the wreck presently lies in 400 feet (120 m) of water off Glenbrook, Nevada. The wreck was first visited in 2002 by a team from New Millennium Dive Expeditions (NMDE) in a record-setting high-altitude dive for Lake Tahoe. As a result of the work that NMDE did on the Tahoe site from 1999 up to their dives in 2002, Tahoe became the first maritime site in Nevada to be listed in the National Register of Historic Places.

== Service history ==
By the end of the 19th century, Lake Tahoe had become known as a vacation resort, with a handful of hotels and communities scattered around its shores, serviced by a number of steamers crossing the lake. Lumber magnate Duane Leroy Bliss ordered the vessel from San Francisco's Union Iron Works in 1894. The design of the Tahoe was carried out by Union Iron Works marine architect H. P. Freer, while the vessel's powerplant, propulsion and steering was handled by mechanical designer Knut Dahl. Due to the vessel's narrow beam of just 17 feet, the propulsion and steering required special attention. Freer and Dahl angled the ship's propeller shafts outwards by five degrees to prevent the propellers from overlapping one another; this had the added bonus of reducing the vessel's turning radius. In addition, the rudder was hinged approximately 1/3 to the aft in order to reduce the amount of effort needed to turn the helm to place the rudder inside the propeller wash and effect a turn. One unique feature of this design was the need to (counterintuitively) advance the throttles on the port engine to effect a turn to port, due to the close spacing of the propellers. The 154-ton hull was subdivided into eight watertight compartments to enhance safety and survivability.

The hull of the Tahoe was fabricated in sections at the Union Iron Works shipyard's San Francisco Pier 70 as Boat #42 in December 1895, which were then disassembled and packaged for transport. The components were then shipped by rail flatcar in pieces to Carson City, then by wagon over Spooner Summit to Glenbrook, reassembled, and launched with much acclaim on June 24, 1896.

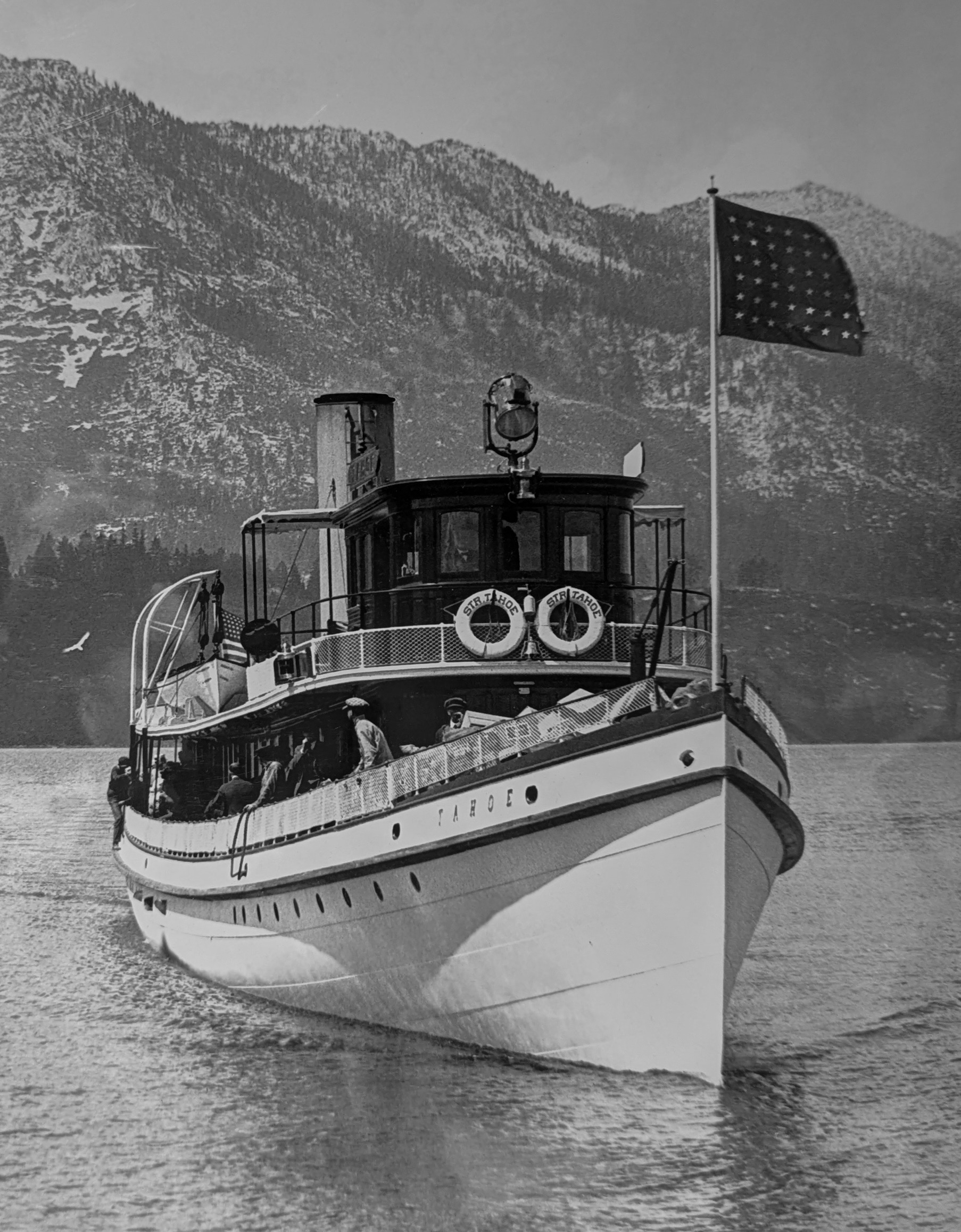
Tahoe off Tallac, 1919

At 169 feet (52 m), Tahoe was the largest of the lake steamers; she was propelled by two wood-fired engines developing a total of 1,200 hp (890 kW), each driving a three-bladed brass propeller at a maximum of 353 RPM up to 18.5 knots. The engines burned approximately 4.5 cords of wood per day, though at some time in her history the ship was converted to burn oil instead of wood. Her 200 passengers enjoyed a well-appointed interior finished with teakwood and mahogany, along with leather upholstery, polished brass fittings, carpeting, and marble fixtures in the lavatories. Modern technologies included 65 electric lights and bells, hot and cold running water, and steam heating in both the forward and aft passenger cabins. At the forward end of the superstructure was a men-only smoking lounge, while directly aft was a dining hall capable of seating thirty people. Crew quarters were located below decks in the ship's stern.

From 1901, Tahoe operated from a railroad pier in Tahoe City during the summer, leaving in the morning, making a daily 73-mile circuit of the shoreline communities, and returning in the late afternoon. In addition to the passengers, she carried freight and mail, which were loaded in the morning before being distributed as the ship circuited Lake Tahoe.

The completion of a road suitable for cars all around the lake in 1934-35, followed by the loss of the mail contract in 1934 to Marian B, made Tahoe uneconomical to operate, and she lay unused for several years. In 1940, Bliss's son William Seth Bliss repurchased the vessel from the operating company; his intent was to scuttle her in shallow water off Glenbrook as a memorial to a bygone era, visible to glass-bottomed boats. Tahoe was scuttled on August 29, 1940, but the underwater slope was unexpectedly steep at the chosen location, and the ship slid down out of sight, ending up with the bow at 360 feet (110 m) and the stern at 490 feet (150 m).

== Wreck discovery ==
In 2002, the Reno-based non-profit organization New Millennium Dive Expeditions set a record for high altitude scuba diving when they reached the wreck of Tahoe. The information they gathered on the wreck was a crucial part of the documentation enabling Tahoe to be listed on the National Register. The work of the NMDE team continued in 2009 where in August and September they visited the wreck again successfully in preparation for three visits in the summer of 2010.

In July 2016 the vessel was filmed by an underwater drone or remote vehicle as part of a project to develop such devices cheaply.
