= Red Dog, California =

Red Dog
- Former settlement
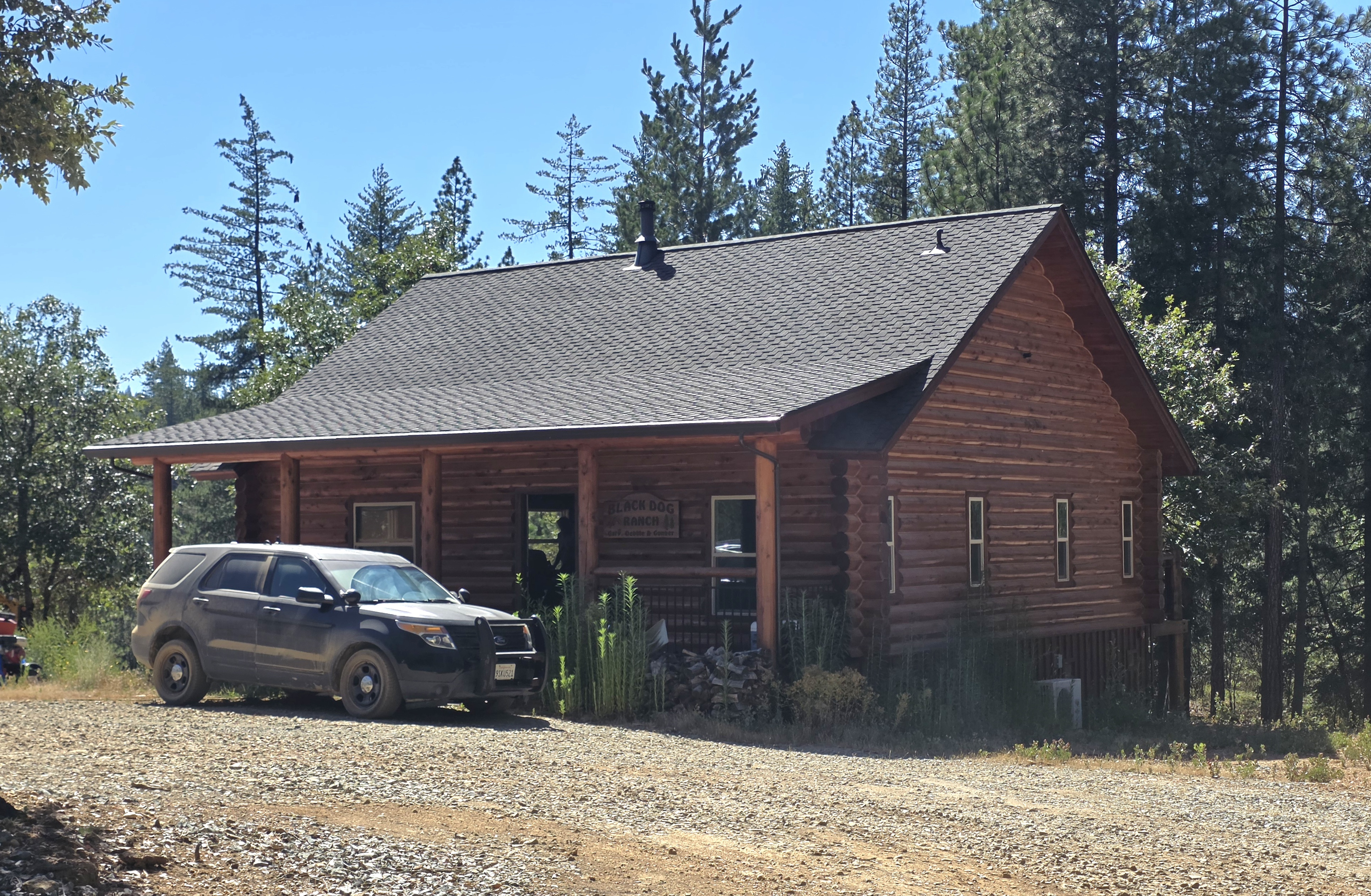
- A modern log cabin in Red Dog

- Location of Red Dog in California
- Coordinates: 39°13′00″N 120°53′58″W
- Country: United States
- State: California
- County: Nevada
- Elevation: 2,615 ft (797 m)
- Time zone: UTC-8 (Pacific (PST))
  - Summer (DST): UTC-7 (PDT)
- Red Dog Townsite
- U.S. National Register of Historic Places
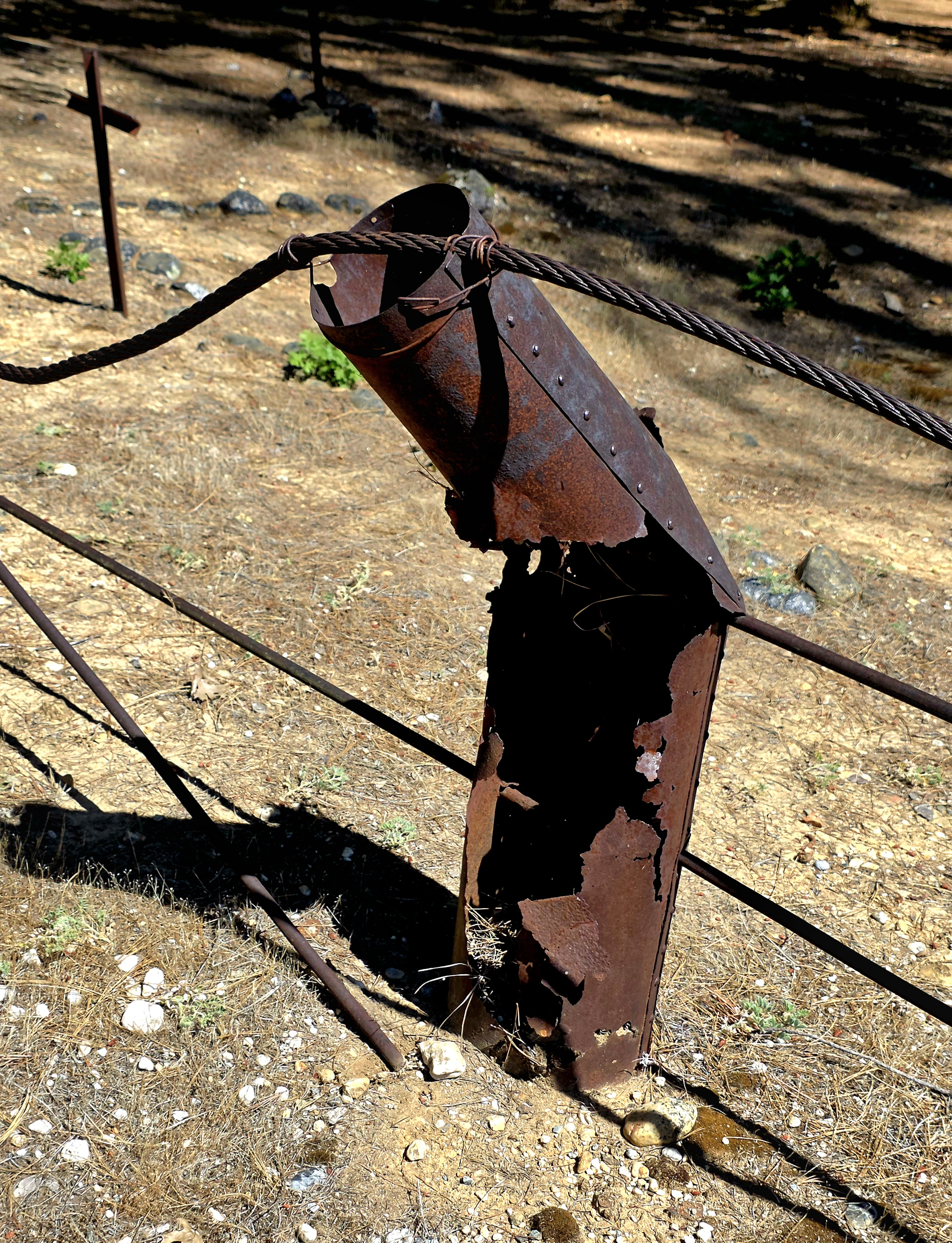
- Rusted fence post at the Red Dog Cemetery

- Location within California Location within the United States
- Location: Address Restricted, Nevada City, California
- NRHP reference No.: 01000968
- Added to NRHP: September 14, 2001

Red Dog (also known as Brooklyn or Brooklin) was a California gold rush mining town located in the Gold Country in south-central Nevada County, California, United States, 6 mi (9.7 km) northeast of Chicago Park. Red Dog Hill, a mine and campsite, was founded by three men all under the age of 22, and was named by their youngest, a 15-year-old prospector. As mining operations grew, the campsite became a settlement, and then a town with a population of 2,000 residents, before it was eventually abandoned. Still considered important today, Red Dog Townsite is listed on the National Register of Historic Places.

== History ==
While prospecting in 1850, three young men, all aged 21 or younger, discovered gold on a hill on the east side of Greenhorn ridge. The two from Arkansas, Henry Jacob Stehr and the Irishman Joseph Chew (or Chow), named the ravine after their home state of Arkansas. Charles ("Charlie") Wilson of Illinois, the youngest of the three at age 15, named the hill "Red Dog" after a zinc mine.

Mining campsites began to form in Red Dog as well as other places nearby such as Chalk Bluff (1.5 mi (2.4 km) away), Hunt's Hill, Little York and You Bet (1 mi (1.6 km) away). Their existence was tied to ongoing mining operations. Red Dog Mining Company's Mine was situated at an elevation of 2,910 ft (890 m) above sea level and expanded over 200 acres (0.81 km^{2}). It used water powered through Old Chalk Bluff ditch from the head of Deer Creek.

Red Dog evolved from a campsite into a settlement by 1851. During the next four years, it became an active and progressive mining town, replete with a department store, hotel, restaurant, professional buildings, lodges, and homes. Eventually, the miners of Chalk Bluff moved to Red Dog, and the town decided to rename itself "Brooklyn" (sometimes spelled "Brooklin"). When a post office was established in 1855, it was the post office's decision to stick with the name Red Dog, as Brooklyn, California already existed in Alameda County.

Several times, the town was devastated by fire; each time, it was rebuilt. The fire of January 1859 resulted in an $8,600 loss. The fire of August 1862 destroyed most of the town's business district, resulting in a $50,000 loss.

An Odd Fellows Lodge preceded the building of a Masonic Lodge, which opened on the east side of Main Street in 1862. In 1863, Main Street and Plumb Street had two general variety stores, a hardware and tin shop, a shoemaker's shop, butcher's shop, blacksmith's shop, dressmaker's shop, two hotels, three saloons, and stands for fruit and liquor. Macy & Martin of Red Dog are credited with inventing a rifled nozzle for hydraulic mining in 1863, an improvement subsequently used by all hydraulic nozzles.

Red Dog was on Mark Twain's 1866 lecture tour that started and ended in San Francisco, October 1 to December 10. Twain lectured in Red Dog on October 24, which marked the first time he was introduced as Mark Twain rather than Samuel Clemens. An old miner who introduced Twain in Red Dog said he only knew two things about him—that he'd never been in a penitentiary and that, "I can't imagine why." The lecture focused on Twain's travels to the Sandwich Islands.

By 1867, the town had four cement Stamp mills, including Wright & Company, and Cozzens, Garber & Company. But the continuous rains of 1867–68 washed away the mine's hydraulic ditches and flumes destroying much of the town. Many of the approximately 300 residents left, and many of the buildings, including the Odd Fellows Lodge, were moved to You Bet. The post office remained until 1869. While three cement mills were operating in Red Dog in 1873, including Wier & Garber, Williams & Riggs, and Wright & Company, the Mason's Lodge closed.

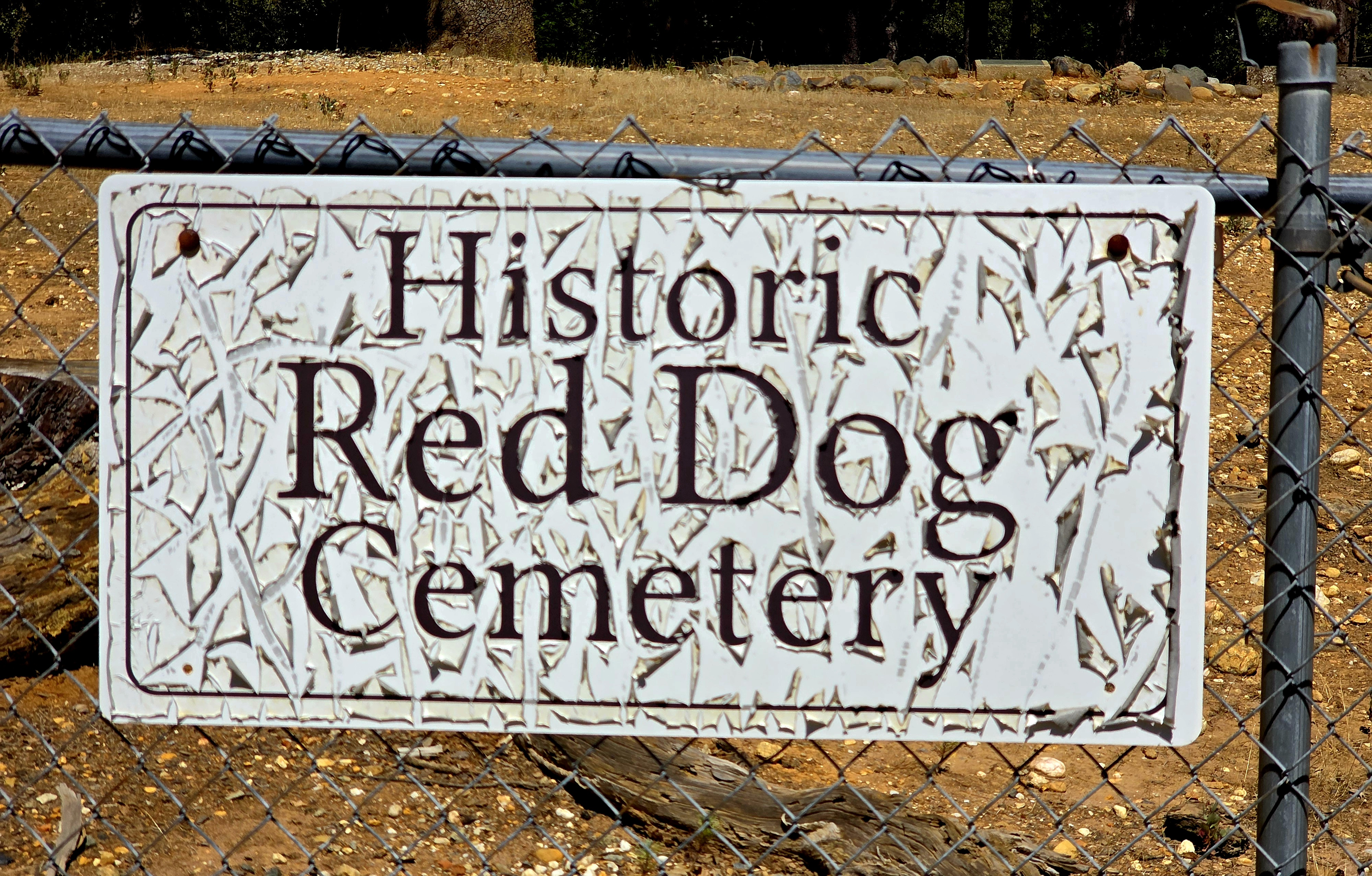
Red Dog Cemetery sign

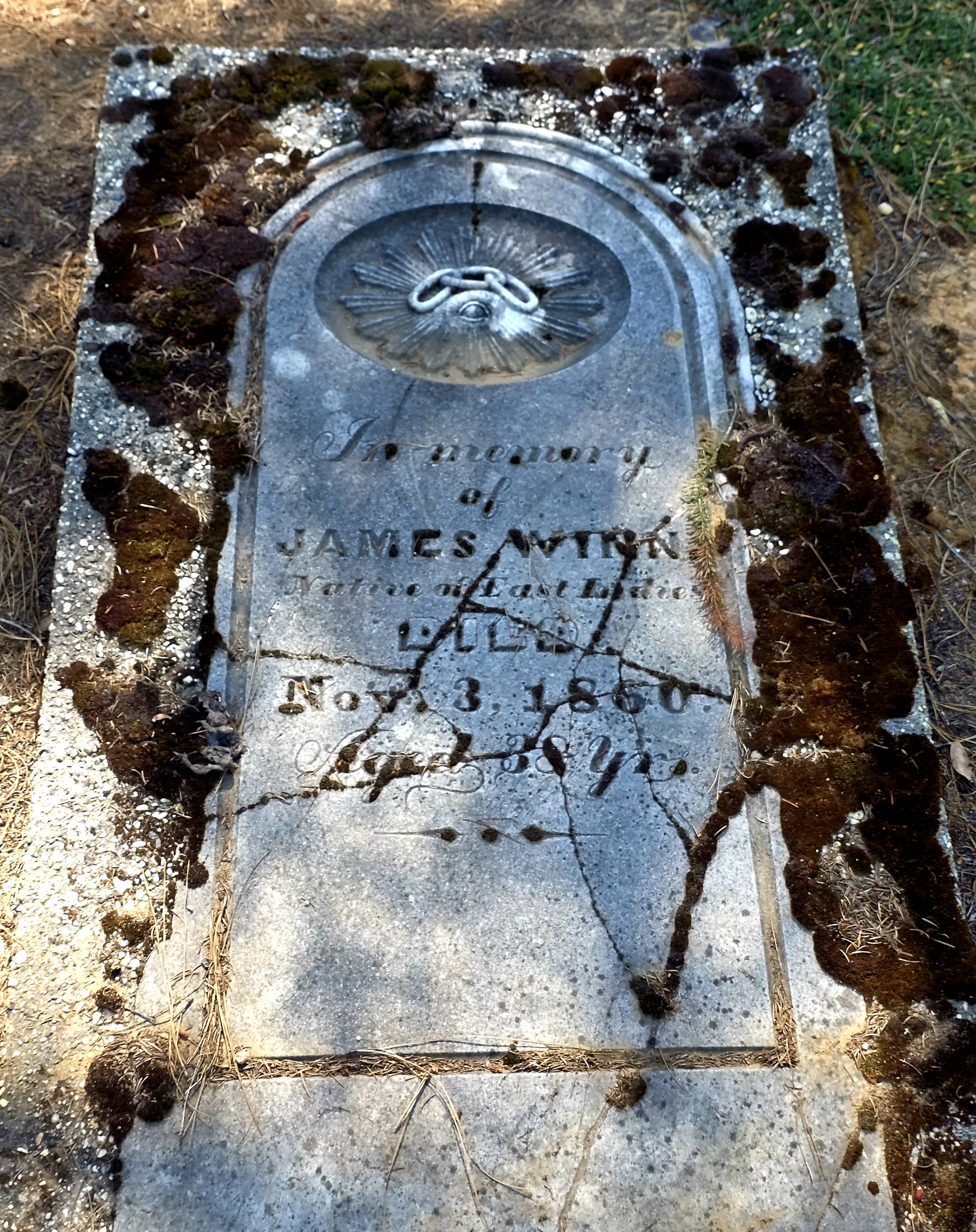
1860 headstone at Red Dog Cemetery

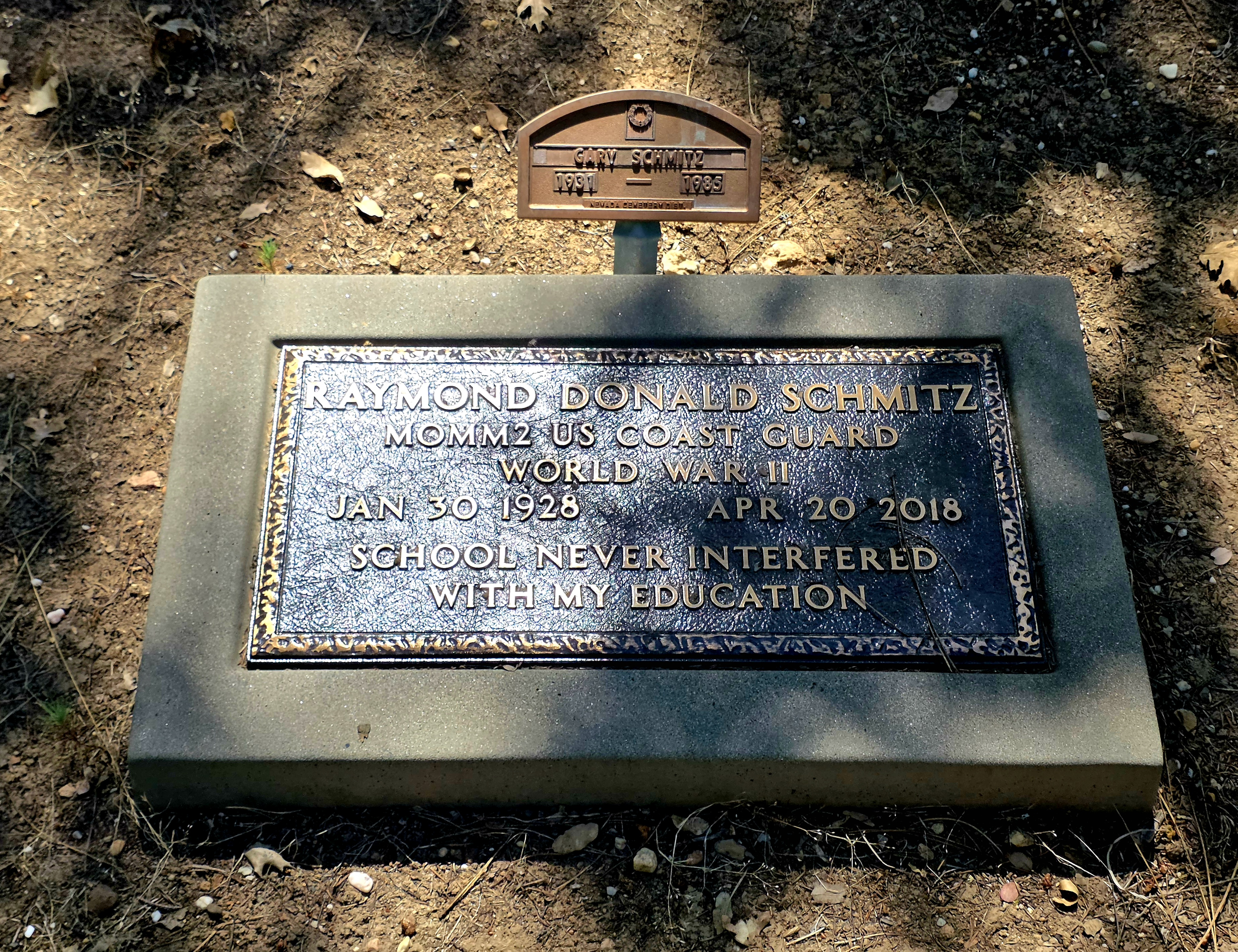
21st century headstone at Red Dog Cemetery

Red Dog Cemetery is the only part of the town that remains today. It is located on You Bet Road near Red Dog Road in what is now Nevada City. Stehr (died 1881), Stehr's son, Chew (died 1900) and three of Chew's brothers are buried there. Burials began around 1860 and have continued into the 21st century.

== Landmark ==
Red Dog was designated by the state as a California Point of Historical Interest (No. N2143) on May 9, 1975.

On September 14, 2001, the Red Dog Townsite was designated a landmark (No. 01000968) by the National Register of Historic Places. Owned by the Federal government, and address restricted, the townsite was honored for its 1850–99 information potential in community planning, development, commerce, settlement and exploration; as well as the social history of those who emigrated to the town, such as the Chinese.

Nevada County also designated Red Dog as a Historical Point of Interest (No. 25).

== See also ==
- California Gold Rush
- National Register of Historic Places listings in Nevada County, California
