= Bear River (Feather River tributary) =

River in California, United States

Bear River Arroyo de los Osos
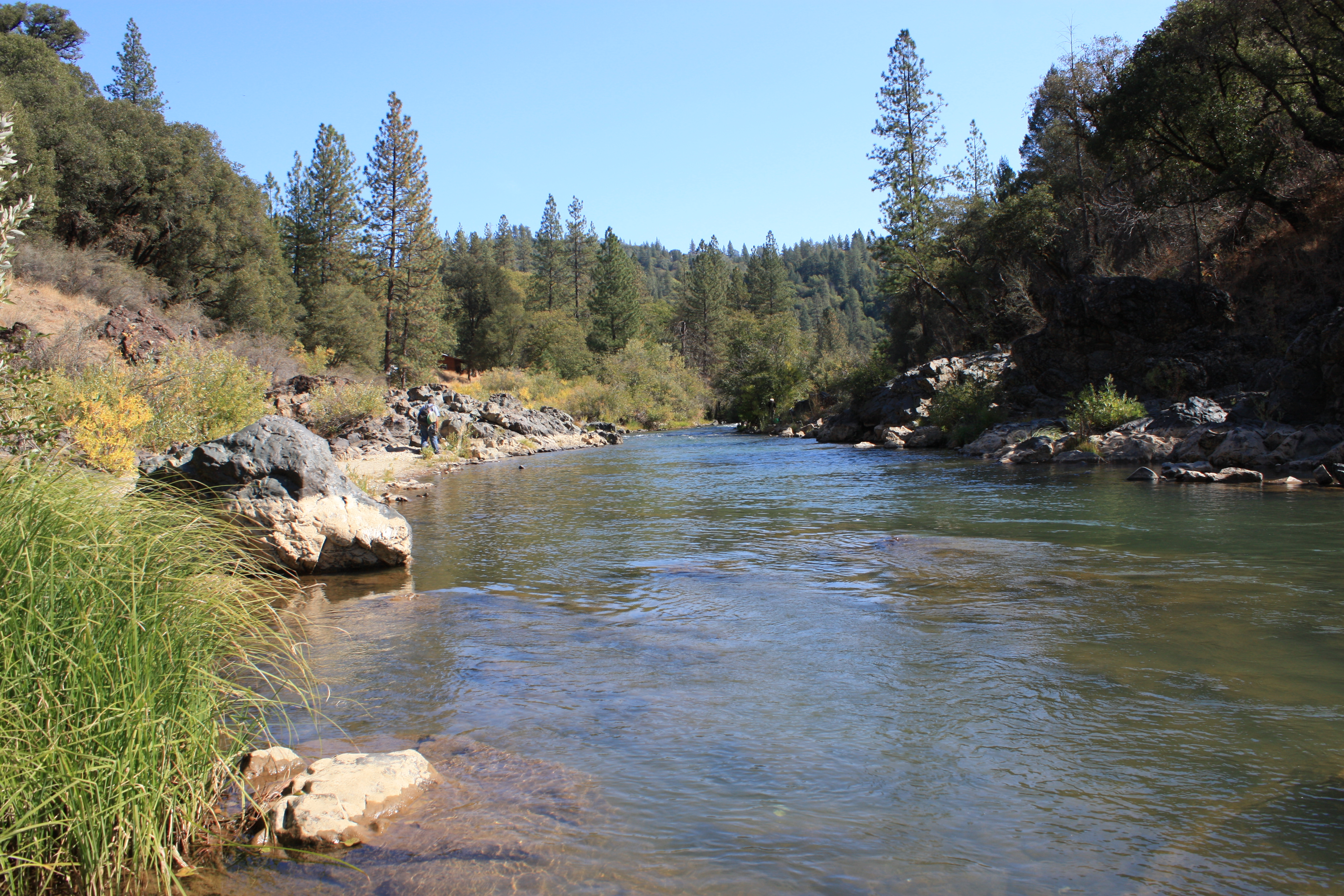
- Bear River in the Sierra foothills

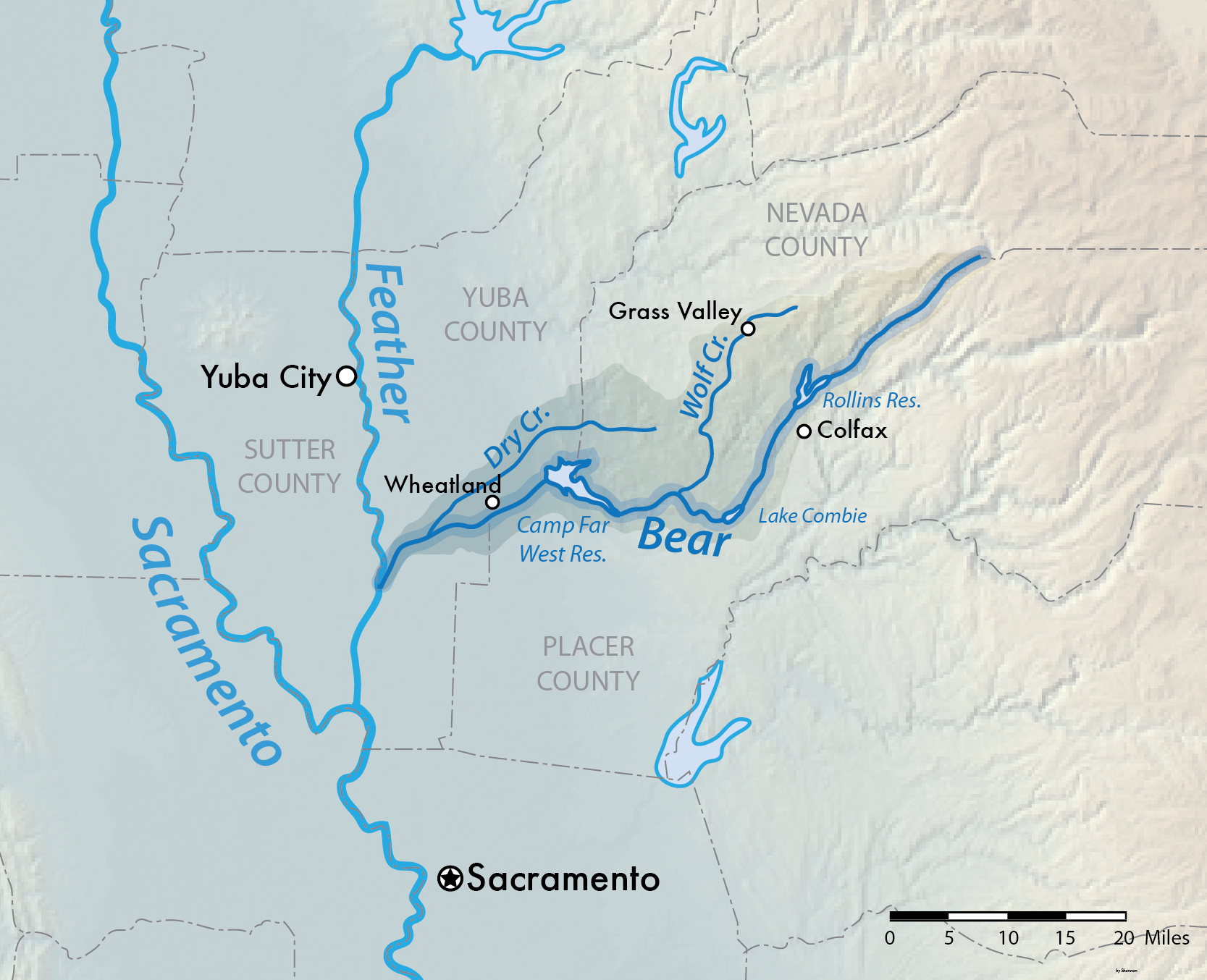
- Map of the Bear River watershed

Location
- Country: United States
- State: California

Physical characteristics
- Source
  - location: Sierra Nevada
  - coordinates: 39°18′29″N 120°39′23″W
  - elevation: 4,800 ft (1,500 m)
- Mouth: Feather River
  - location: Sacramento Valley, United States
  - coordinates: 38°56′23″N 121°34′51″W
  - elevation: 23 ft (7.0 m)
- Length: 73 mi (117 km)
- Basin size: 295 sq mi (760 km^{2})
- Discharge
  - location: Wheatland, CA
  - average: 402 cu ft/s (11.4 m^{3}/s)
  - minimum: 0 cu ft/s (0 m^{3}/s)
  - maximum: 48,000 cu ft/s (1,400 m^{3}/s)

The Bear River is a tributary of the Feather River in the Sierra Nevada, winding through four California counties: Yuba, Sutter, Placer, and Nevada. About 73 miles (117 km) long, the river flows generally southwest through the Sierra then west through the Central Valley, draining a narrow, rugged watershed of 295 square miles (760 km^{2}).

The California Office of Environmental Health Hazard Assessment has issued a safe advisory for any fish caught in Bear River due to elevated levels of mercury.

== Geography ==
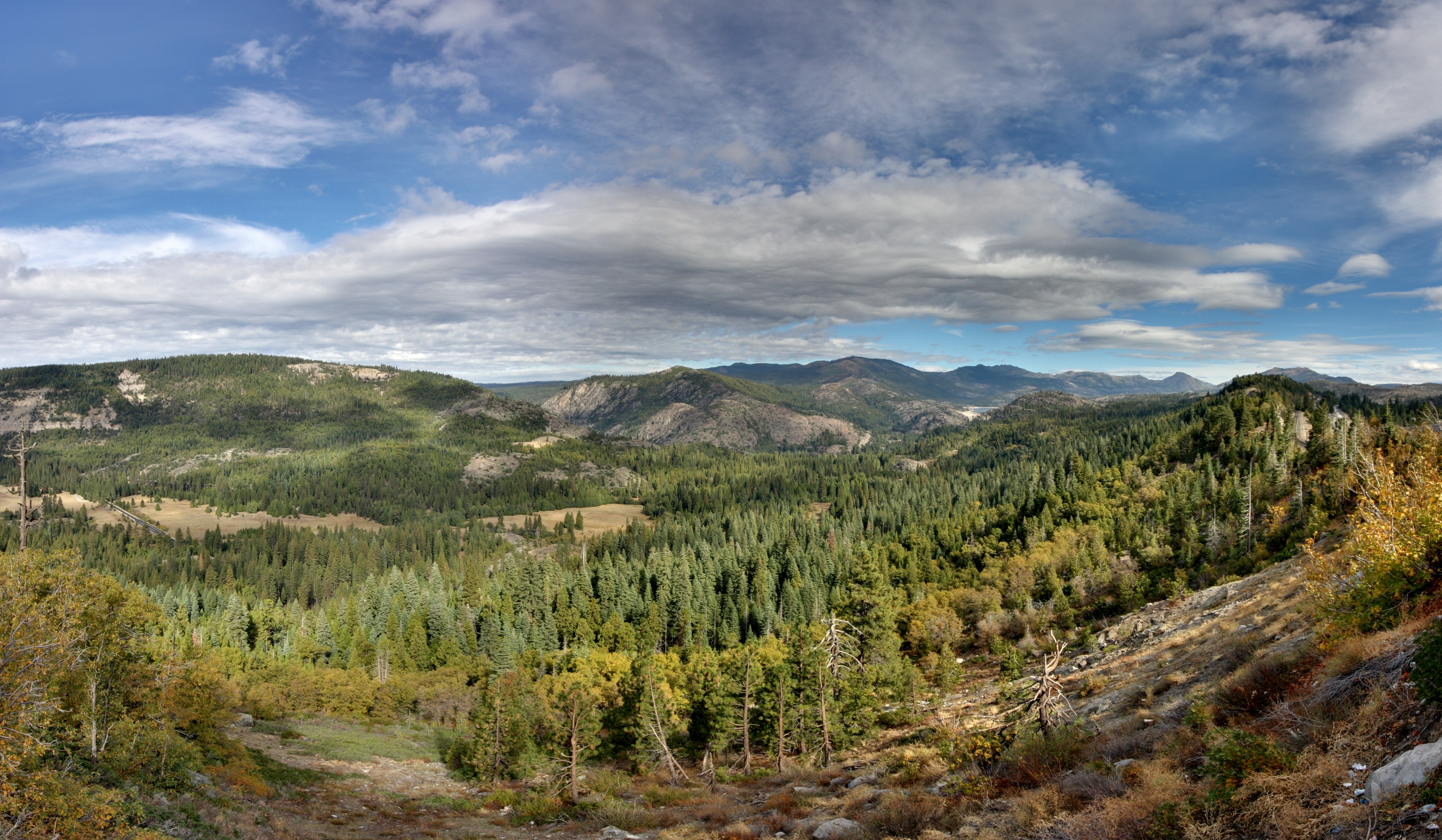
The headwaters at Bear Valley, seen from Emigrant Gap

The Bear River originates at Emigrant Gap, as a tiny stream on the border of Nevada and Placer Counties in the Tahoe National Forest. The headwaters are on a ridge immediately to the south of the South Yuba River and north of the North Fork American River. The river flows west into the Bear Valley then enters a deep and narrow gorge, passing the community of Dutch Flat. Continuing along the Nevada–Placer County line it receives Steephollow Creek from the north before widening into Rollins Reservoir, formed by the 242-foot (74 m) high Rollins Dam east of Chicago Park. While part of the reservoir, the river is joined by Greenhorn Creek from the north.

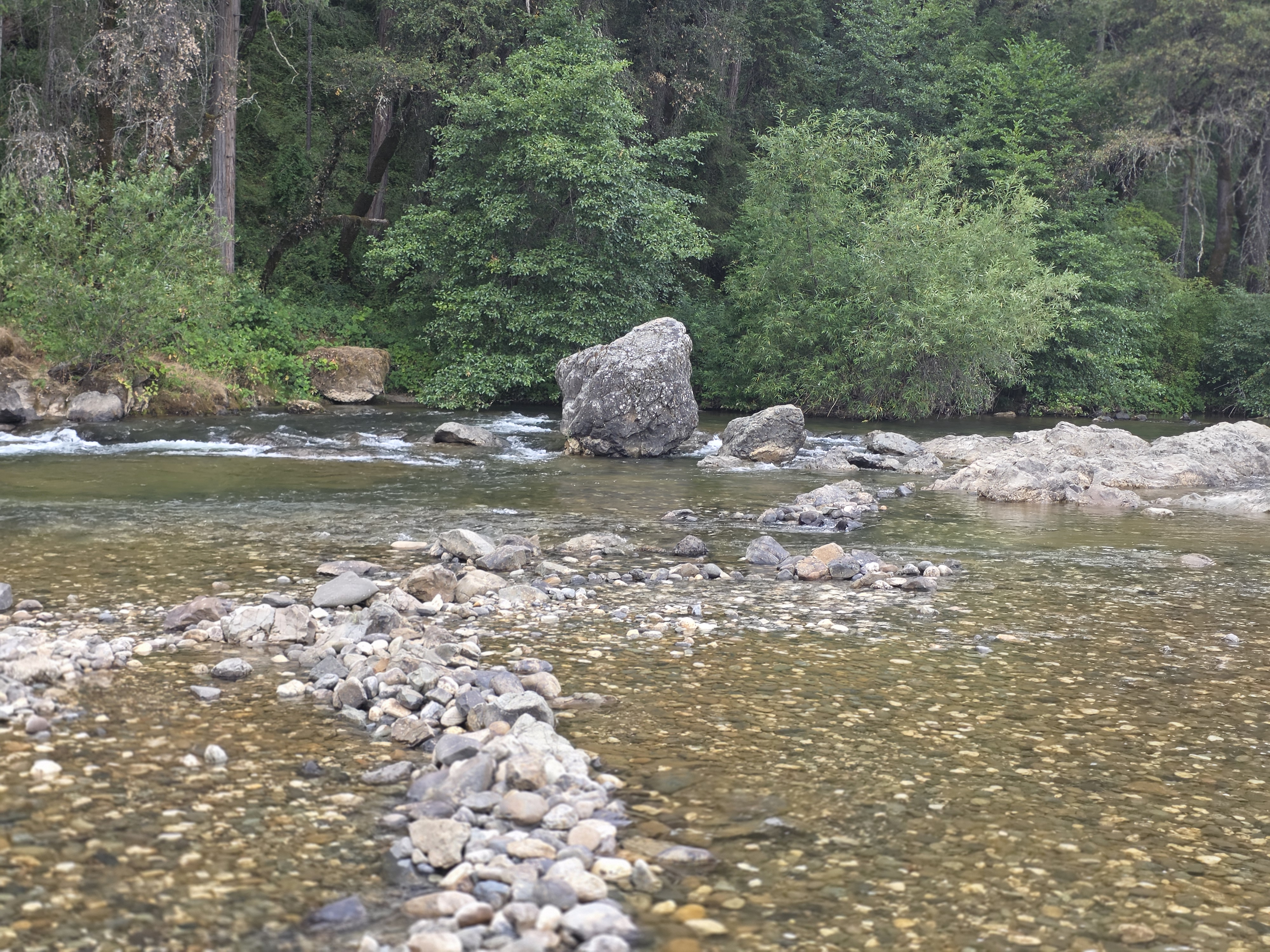
View of the river from the Bear River Park Day Use Area

Below the dam the river flows southwest through the Sierra foothills, past Colfax and Meadow Vista, through Lake Combie and a short but rugged gorge above Garden Bar. Shortly downstream it widens into Camp Far West Reservoir, where it begins to define the Placer–Yuba County border. Further west it flows into the Sacramento Valley where it forms a large alluvial floodplain. Starting at Wheatland it forms the border of Yuba and Sutter Counties. A few miles below this point it receives Dry Creek from the north, then flows into the Feather River at Nicolaus, 11 miles (18 km) above the Feather's confluence with the larger Sacramento River, and about 20 miles (32 km) due south of Yuba City–Marysville.

With a mean annual flow of 410 cubic feet per second (12 m^{3}/s) at Wheatland, the Bear is the smallest major tributary of the Feather River. Monthly flows range from 1,130 cubic feet per second (32 m^{3}/s) in March to 20 cubic feet per second (0.57 m^{3}/s) in September. Because the Bear River watershed is at a relatively low elevation compared to other Sierra streams, rainfall, not snowmelt, is the main source of runoff. The flow rate is also heavily influenced by numerous dams and diversions on the river.

== Geology ==
The Bear River is considered an underfit stream, as a much larger, snow-fed river flowed through its channel in ancient times. Millions of years ago the upper part of the South Yuba River (above Lake Spaulding) flowed into the Bear River at Emigrant Gap. Stream piracy, possibly assisted by glaciation during the Ice Ages, caused the upper Bear to be "captured" into the Yuba drainage to the north and shortening the Bear by about 25 miles (40 km) as a result.

== History ==
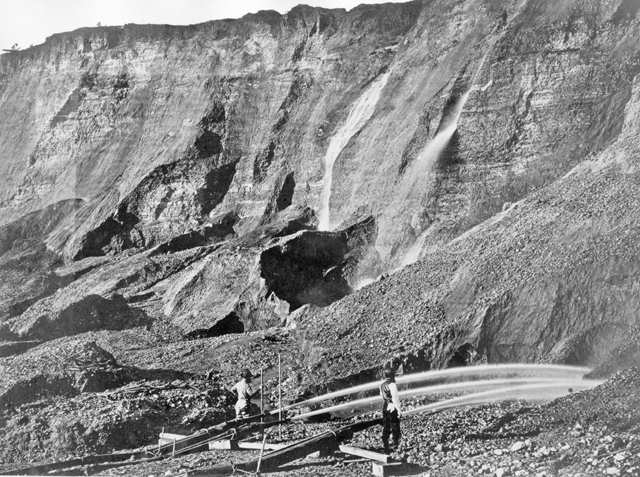
Gold miners using hydraulic mining to excavate an eroded bluff with jets of water at Dutch Flat, California, sometime between 1857 and 1870.

The Bear River area has long been home to the Nisenan people.

Its basin is in California's Gold Country and was one of the richest areas of the 19th century California Gold Rush. Major mining sites in the Bear River basin included You Bet, Red Dog, Dutch Flat, Gold Run, Waloupa, Little York, and Chalk Bluff.

Large amounts of land in the Bear River drainage were radically altered by hydraulic mining. At You Bet and Red Dog 47,000,000 cubic yards (36,000,000 m^{3}) of gold-bearing gravel was washed out; at Dutch Flat 105,000,000 cubic yards (80,000,000 m^{3}); and at Gold Run 128,000,000 cubic yards (98,000,000 m^{3}).

== Engineering ==
The Bear River has been significantly dammed and diverted for irrigation, domestic water supply, and hydropower generation. The river flow has been greatly augmented via diversions from the larger Yuba River basin to the north, via the Drum-Spaulding Hydroelectric Project and Yuba-Bear Hydroelectric Project. The former, completed in the 1910s primarily for hydropower generation is owned by PG&E; the latter was built in the 1960s by the Nevada Irrigation District (NID). Although nominally two separate projects, the complex system of some 40 reservoirs in the Middle and South Forks of the Yuba and on the upper Bear River is heavily interconnected, and operated as one.

About 200,000 acre-feet (0.25 km^{3}) of water from the Yuba River Basin enters the Bear River Basin via the Drum Canal, which is fed by a tunnel from Lake Spaulding. The uppermost dams on the Bear River are at Dutch Flat Forebay and Dutch Flat Afterbay, both small hydroelectric diversion dams. Water from the upper Bear River and the Drum Canal pass through these dams and drive powerhouses at Drum, Dutch Flat and Chicago Park.

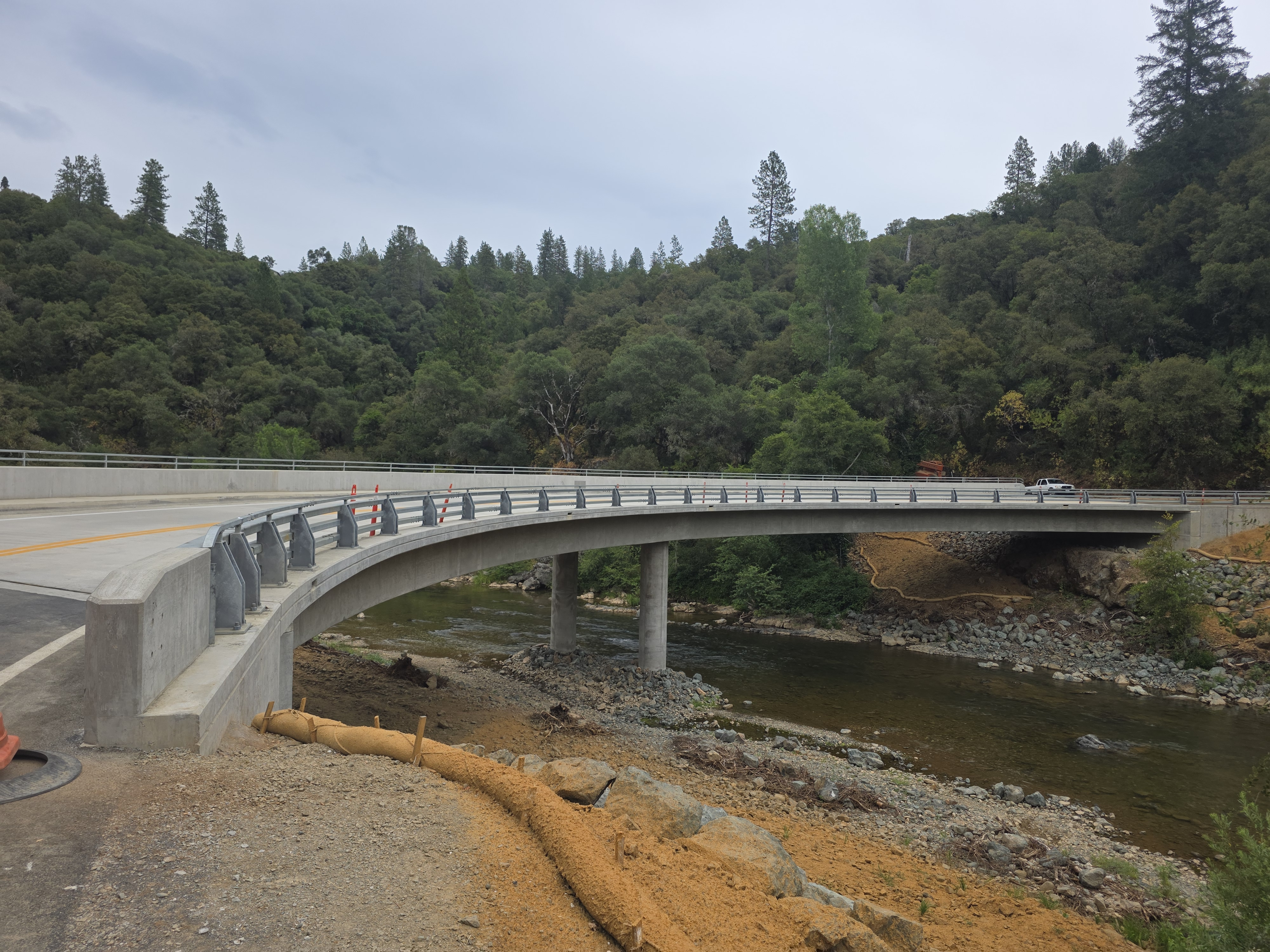
Newly constructed Dog Bar Bridge over the Bear River in 2026

Below Chicago Park Powerhouse, at the confluence of Greenhorn Creek, the Bear River is impounded by Rollins Dam, which forms a 66,000-acre-foot (0.081 km^{3}) reservoir. The reservoir stores water for irrigation and hydroelectricity, and serves the important purpose of trapping sediment from early hydraulic mining activity in the upper Bear River basin.

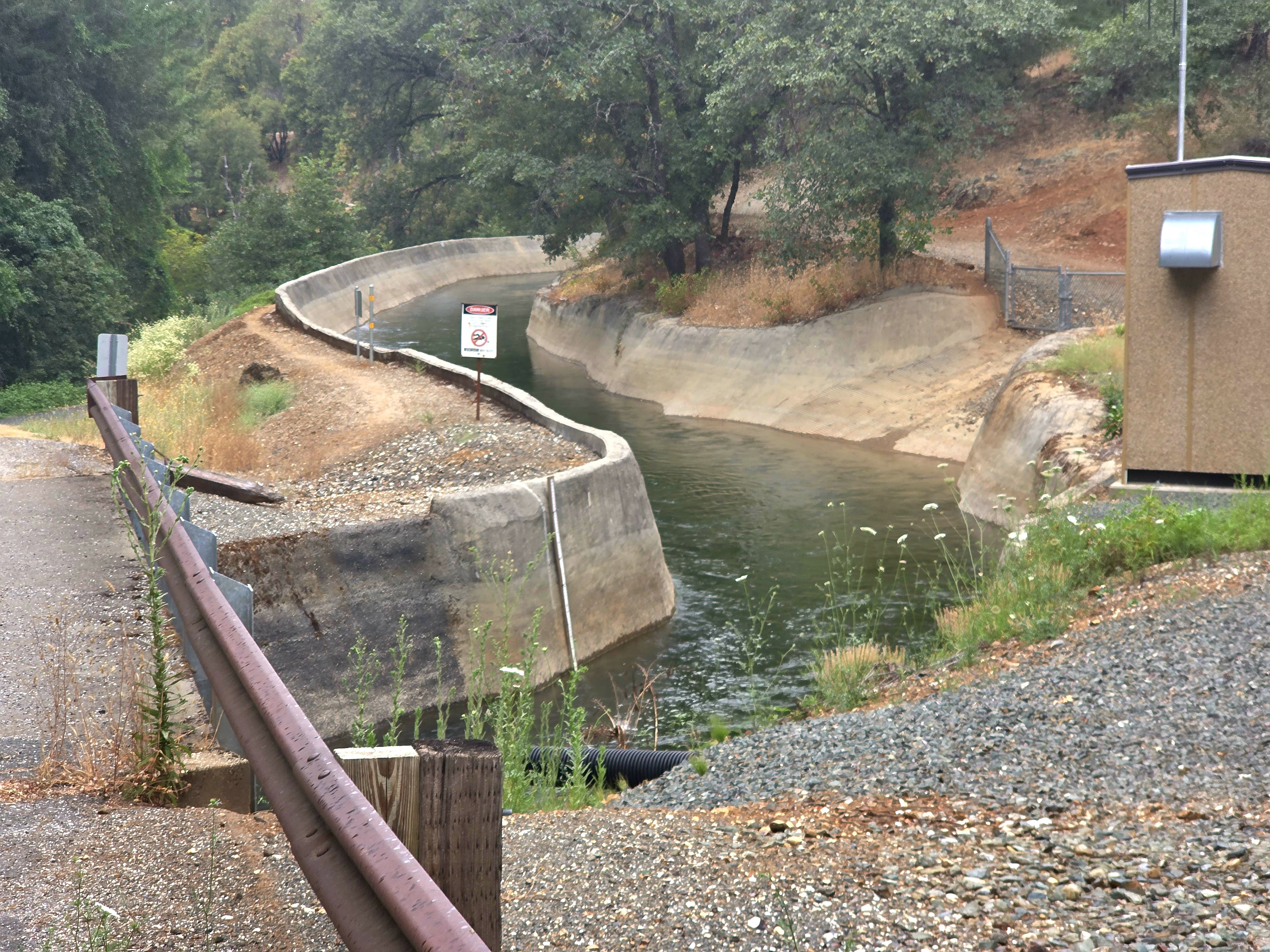
Bear River Canal, Placer County, California

Directly below Rollins Dam lies the Bear River Diversion Dam, which diverts about 290,000 acre-feet (0.36 km^{3}) of water per year into the Bear River Canal, which provides for several rural communities in Placer County between Colfax and Auburn. Excess water from the canal enters the American River basin via a powerhouse at Folsom Lake.

The remaining water in the Bear River flows downstream to Lake Combie, which holds about 3,500 acre-feet (4,300,000 m^{3}). The Van Giesen Dam, which forms the lake, is the oldest dam on the Bear River proper, completed in 1928. The dam diverts water into the Combie Aqueduct, which supplies about 40 percent of the water for NID's lower division, about 43,400 acre-feet (0.0535 km^{3}) per year. Further downstream is Camp Far West Dam, which forms the largest reservoir on the river at 104,500 acre-feet (0.1289 km^{3}). The reservoir provides for both flood control and irrigation in the lower valley of the Bear River. Another mile downstream lies Camp Far West Diversion Dam, the final dam on the river, which diverts 124,500 acre-feet (0.1536 km^{3}) per year into the South Sutter and Camp Far West Canals to irrigate about 64,000 acres (26,000 ha) of the Sacramento Valley. About 80 percent of the South Sutter irrigation district is planted with rice.

=== Dam proposals ===
In July 2011, a dam project for the Bear River was revealed to be under study by a consortium of out of area water districts. The South Sutter Water District (Trowbridge), along with the cities of Napa, American Canyon, and Palmdale, the Castaic Lake Water Agency, and the San Bernardino Valley Municipal Water District, issued a preliminary study on siting a new dam north of the present Camp Far West Reservoir and south of Combie and Rollins reservoirs farther upstream. The dam would be in the NID (Nevada Irrigation District) water district and would flood portions of Nevada County and Placer County. The proposed Garden Bar Dam would be located in areas already set aside as conservation and wildlife areas, and the resulting lake would inundate prime wildlife habitat and oak and savannah grasslands.

Because of concerns that the water that would fill the proposed large reservoir (245,000 to 400,000 acre-feet (302,000,000 to 493,000,000 m^{3}), according to the study, the largest option would be 3 square miles (7.8 km^{2})) is already allocated for existing impoundment lakes by dams on the Bear River at Camp Far West, Combie, and Rollins, the actual feasibility of the project seems speculative, and has raised doubts as to the actual purpose of the proposal.

A quote from the study says "Water Availability: The report acknowledges the existence of "numerous issues that would need to be resolved to confirm the availability of this water and the ability to convey a portion of it through the Delta, if so desired."

Due to poor economic justifications and opposition from the conservation group, Sierra Watch, local land trusts, ranchers, and the board of supervisors of both Placer and Nevada Counties, the water district dropped the proposed Garden Bar Dam in July 2012.

In 2014, the NID put forth another plan for a new dam/reservoir on the Bear River at the Parker site, located just above Lake Combie. Upon approval, the proposed Centennial Dam would store about 112,000 acre-feet (0.138 km^{3}). The "Save the Bear, Stop Centennial" campaign was created in opposition to the proposal by non-profit environmental organizations, the Foothills Water Network and South Yuba River Citizens League (SYRCL), with the support of other community and conservation groups such as Sierra Watch.

== See also ==
- List of rivers of California
