= Hunt's Hill =

Hunt's Hill may refer to:

- Hunt's Hill, California
- Hunt's Hill, Naphill
