= Centennial Dam =

Cancelled dam in California, US

Centennial Dam was a proposed dam on the border of Placer County and Nevada County in Northern California near Colfax. The contingent reservoir would have created by a 275-foot (84 m) dam along the Bear River between two existing reservoirs — Lake Combie and Rollins Reservoir — and would hold 110,000 acre-feet (140,000,000 m^{3}).

== Name ==
The project, set to be run by the Nevada Irrigation District upon approval, was planned to begin construction in 2021, which would coincide with the district's 100-year anniversary — thus providing the dam and reservoir its proposed name.

== Cost ==
The Nevada Irrigation District suggests construction of the dam will exceed $250 million, with an additional $54 million allotted for a new road crossing.

== Criticism ==
The "Save the Bear, Stop Centennial" campaign was created in opposition of the proposal by non-profit environmental organizations, the Foothills Water Network and South Yuba River Citizens League.

In February 2018, the California Water Commission released the Public Benefit Ratio for the proposed dam. According to the commission, the application submitted by the Nevada Irrigation District shows the proposed Centennial Dam has a Public Benefit Ratio of zero. The zero score means the dam does not qualify for any Proposition 1 funding.
