= Bear River Bridge =

Coordinates: 39.1355°N 120.9526°W

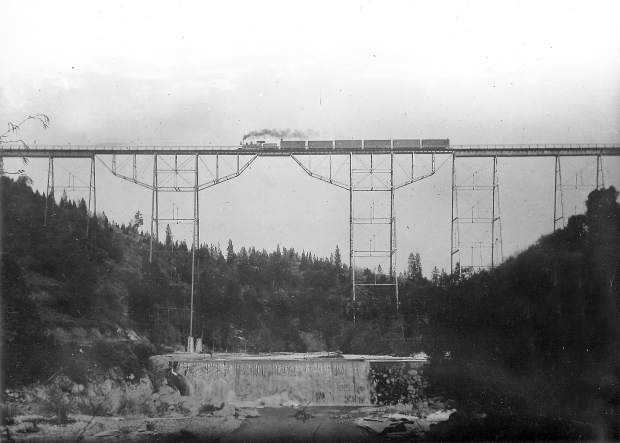
Engine No. 2 crossing the new steel bridge in December 1908

The Bear River Bridge was located in Nevada County, California, from 1908 to 1963, replacing an earlier wooden structure. When built over the Bear River, it was the highest railway bridge in the state.

The bridge was built by the Nevada County Narrow Gauge Railroad, under the management of Sarah Kidder. From the surface of the water, at an average stage, up to the track was 200 feet (61 m). The total length was about 900 feet (270 m), and at the time of construction there were no approaches, the opposite banks being abrupt. The pier foundations were built of reinforced concrete, requiring more than 500 cubic yards. The piers and superstructure were of structural steel, of which about 500 tons were used. All the steel material was furnished by the American Bridge Company of San Francisco, and the constructing contractors were Shattuck & Edinger Construction Company, also of San Francisco. The total cost of the bridge was approximately US$70,000.

The engineering involved much difficulty—principally due to the unusual height of the structure. At the beginning of the work the contractors stretched a 2.25 inch diameter steel cable from bank to bank more than 200 feet (61 m) above the Bear River, and 1,000 feet (300 m) long. By means of this cable all of the structural steel material required, as well as the concrete, were hoisted and conveyed by a trolley to the required point and lowered to the proper position. It took about six months to complete construction. Only a small force of men were employed and the work necessarily progressed rather slowly.

The bridge was on a 1 mile (1.6 km) long cut-off which shortens the road 2 miles (3.2 km), and also eliminated two long wooden bridges, each 100 feet (30 m) high, and one 400 feet (120 m) tunnel.

The bridge was taken down to make way for the Rollins Dam in 1963.

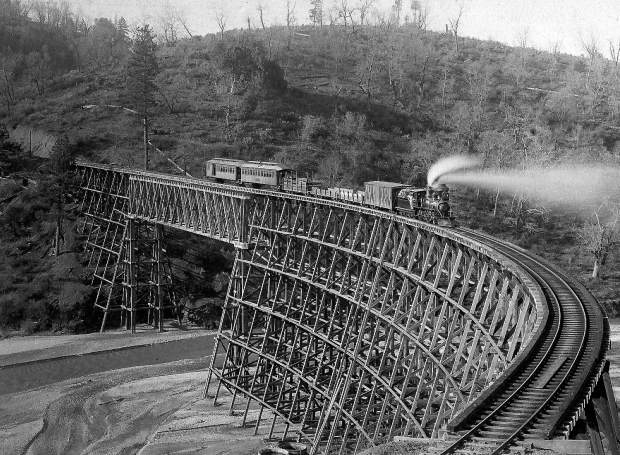
Mixed passenger and freight train on the old Bear River bridge, 1895

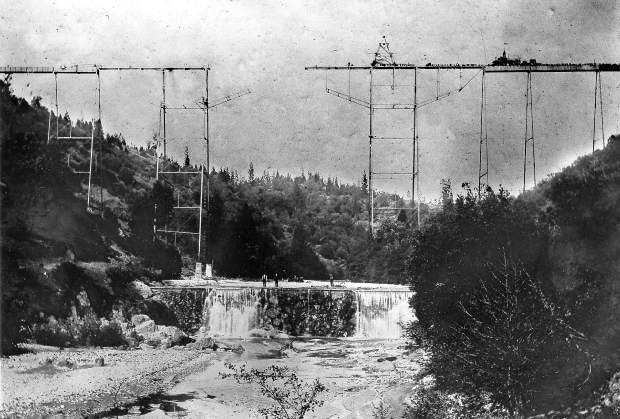
Bridge over Bear River during construction, 1908
