= California State Route 174 =

Highway in California

State Route 174

- SR 174 highlighted in red

Route information
- Maintained by Caltrans
- Length: 13.096 mi (21.076 km)
- History: State highway in 1933; SR 174 in 1964

Major junctions
- South end: I-80 in Colfax
- North end: SR 20 / SR 49 in Grass Valley

Location
- Country: United States
- State: California
- Counties: Placer, Nevada

Highway system
- State highways in California; Interstate; US; State; Scenic; History; Pre‑1964; Unconstructed; Deleted; Freeways
← SR 173	→ SR 175

State Route 174 (SR 174) is a state highway in the U.S. state of California. The two-lane 13-mile (21 km) highway in the western Sierra Nevada, added to the state highway system in 1933, connects Interstate 80 in Colfax with SR 20/SR 49 in Grass Valley, crossing the Bear River next to a 1924 concrete arch bridge. The majority of the route is eligible for the State Scenic Highway System, but local residents have blocked its designation due to property right concerns.

== Route description ==
Route 174 is defined in section 474, subdivision (a), of the California Streets and Highways Code, and that the highway is "from Route 80 near the City of Colfax to Route 20 near the City of Grass Valley". In addition, subdivision (b) permits the state to relinquish control of the segment in Grass Valley to the city.

State Route 174 begins at exit 135 of I-80 in Colfax. Immediately after crossing I-80, the route turns right on Auburn Street and right again on Central Street, which bypasses downtown; a business route follows Auburn Street, Grass Valley Street, and Main Street through downtown. SR 174 follows the old Lincoln Highway (US 40) north out of downtown to Rollins Lake Road, where the present state highway turns northwest along the Colfax Highway. It then crosses the Bear River from Placer County into Nevada County on a 1987 bridge, with the old 1924 bridge preserved for non-motorized traffic. The land flattens out as SR 174 curves north and west through the Empire Mine State Historic Park into Grass Valley. Turning west on Colfax Avenue, the state highway passes under the SR 20/SR 49 freeway before ending just beyond at Auburn Street, the former surface routing of SR 49.

SR 174 is not part of the National Highway System, a network of highways that are considered essential to the country's economy, defense, and mobility by the Federal Highway Administration. SR 174 is eligible to be included in the State Scenic Highway System, but it is not officially designated as a scenic highway by the California Department of Transportation.

== History ==
The Capital Construction Company began improving the county road between Colfax (on Route 37, signed as US 40) and Grass Valley (on Route 17) under contract on September 29, 1931, and completed the work by mid-September 1932. The state legislature placed it on the state highway system in 1933 as an extension of the existing Nevada City-Downieville Route 25. In the 1964 renumbering, the highway received a signed designation, State Route 174.

Local residents created the Colfax Highway Association in 1967 at the Peardale firehouse, about halfway between the two ends, in order to preserve the rural nature of the road. When the 21-foot (6.5 m) wide 1924 concrete arch bridge that took SR 174 across the Bear River on the county line was set for replacement in the late 1980s, the group successfully lobbied to preserve it for non-motorized traffic. The association also pushed for Nevada County's Gold Country Stage bus service to add a route along the highway to Colfax, which was agreed to in late 1998 and still runs as Route 12, connecting downtown Grass Valley with Colfax's Amtrak station. After a request by Nevada County in 1988, the state legislature designated the part of SR 174 in unincorporated Nevada County (between the county line and the Grass Valley city limits) as eligible for the State Scenic Highway System in 1991. In 1999, the Colfax Highway Association attempted to get the route officially declared a State Scenic Highway. They argued that the designation would "protect the scenic character and rural flavor of the highway". A newly formed group, Concerned Citizens for 174, opposed the designation because it would restrict the property rights of residents along the highway, for instance requiring them to use "natural colors". The opposition was successful, and SR 174 remains eligible for State Scenic Highway status but is not a State Scenic Highway.

== Major intersections ==
Except where prefixed with a letter, postmiles were measured on the road as it was in 1964, based on the alignment that existed at the time, and do not necessarily reflect current mileage. Postmile prefixes include: R reflecting a realignment in the route since then, M indicating a second realignment, L referring to an overlap due to a correction or change, and T indicating postmiles classified as temporary. Segments that remain unconstructed or have been relinquished to local control may be omitted. The numbers reset at county lines; the start and end postmiles in each county are given in the county column.

County	Location	Postmile	Destinations	Notes
Placer; PLA 0.00-2.88	Colfax	0.00	I-80 – Reno, Sacramento	Interchange; south end of SR 174; I-80 exit 135
Placer; PLA 0.00-2.88	Colfax	0.14	Auburn Street (SR 174 Bus. north) / Central Street	Former US 40 (Lincoln Highway) east
Placer; PLA 0.00-2.88	Colfax	0.73	Main Street (SR 174 Bus. south)	Former US 40 (Lincoln Highway) west
Placer; PLA 0.00-2.88		1.63	Rollins Lake Road – Rollins Lake	Former US 40 (Lincoln Highway) east
Nevada; NEV 0.00-10.22		6.83	Brunswick Road	
Nevada; NEV 0.00-10.22	Grass Valley	10.17 10.22	SR 20 / SR 49 (Golden Center Freeway) / Auburn Street – Nevada City, Marysville, Auburn	Interchange; north end of SR 174; Auburn Street is former SR 49; SR 20 exit 182A
Nevada; NEV 0.00-10.22	Grass Valley	10.22	Neal Street	Continuation beyond SR 20 / SR 49
1.000 mi = 1.609 km; 1.000 km = 0.621 mi

== Colfax business loop ==
State Route 174 Business
- Location: Colfax, California

State Route 174 Business (SR 174 Bus.) is a short, unsigned business route of California State Route 174 in Colfax. It provides access to downtown Colfax as Auburn Street, Grass Valley Street, and Main Street. The business route follows the original routing of US 40.

=== Major intersections ===
The entire route is in Colfax, Placer County.

mi	km	Destinations	Notes
0.0	0.0	SR 174 (Central Street, Auburn Street)	Southern terminus; former US 40 west; connects to I-80
0.3	0.48	West Grass Valley Street, South Main Street	
0.7	1.1	SR 174	Northern terminus; former US 40 east
1.000 mi = 1.609 km; 1.000 km = 0.621 mi
