= Chalk Bluff =

Chalk Bluff may refer to:

- Chalk Bluff, California, a gold rush town
- Chalk Bluff, Arkansas, listed on the National Register of Historic Places in Clay County, Arkansas
