= Peardale, California =

Unincorporated community in California, United States

Peardale
- Unincorporated community
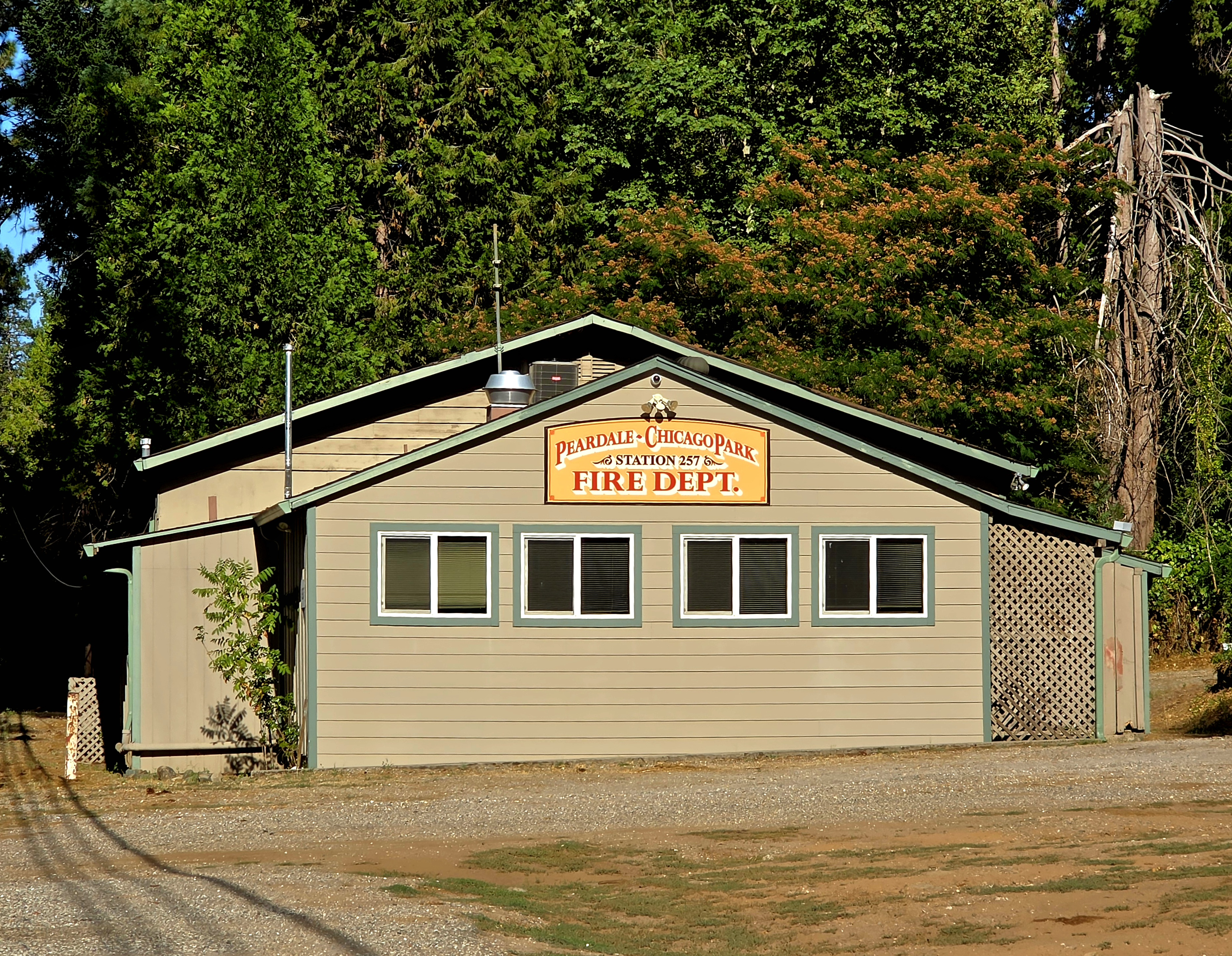
- Peardale - Chicago Park Fire Station

- Location of Peardale in California
- Coordinates: 39°11′28″N 121°00′00″W
- Country: United States
- State: California
- County: Nevada
- Elevation: 2,710 ft (826 m)
- Time zone: UTC-8 (Pacific (PST))
  - Summer (DST): UTC-7 (PDT)
- Area code: 530

Peardale is an unincorporated community in Nevada County, California, United States, along State Route 174, southeast of Cedar Ridge, California and northwest of Chicago Park, California.

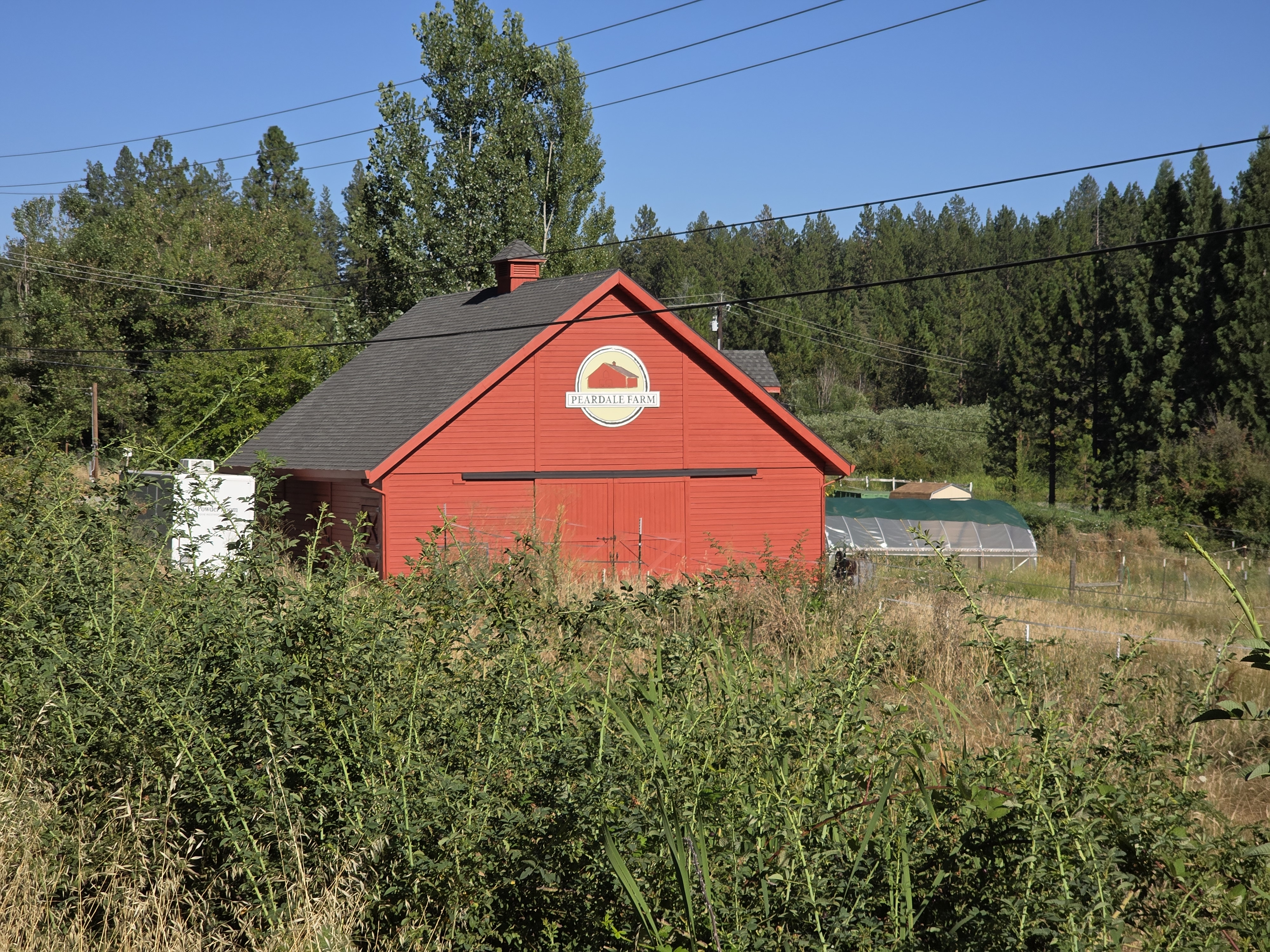
Peardale Farm barn

Peardale contains riparian, upland, and mixed conifer forest habitats.

Peardale is located on the former route of the Nevada County Narrow Gauge Railroad, which stopped operating in 1942. The Peardale post office operated from 1916 to 1927.
