= Little York, California =

Little York
- Former settlement
- Location in California
- Coordinates: 39°11′43″N 120°52′34″W
- Country: United States
- State: California
- County: Nevada County
- Elevation: 2,927 ft (892 m)
- Time zone: UTC-8 (Pacific (PST))
  - Summer (DST): UTC-7 (PDT)

Little York (previously: Little New York) is the name of one of the first gold mining towns established in Nevada County, California as well as the name of the township in which it was situated. The town was located on the Lowell Ridge between Steephollow Creek and the Bear River, about 13 miles east of Nevada City, California and about 1 mile southwest of Dutch Flat, California at an elevation of about 2800 feet.

== Early history ==
Little York owes its establishment to geography. It lay near the intersection of the Old Emigrant Trail and a branch of the Blue Lead gold channel, which enters Nevada County around Snow Point and leaves just east of Little York. 49er emigrants to California were able to find gold in the various streams and ravines in the area. In the fall of 1850, several miners built the first cabin around Little York and found rich diggings. By 1852, a substantial town has been established around a plaza, featuring stores, butchers, breweries, saloons, sawmills, a shoemaker, a meeting house and church and a theater. The population was estimated at 600. It was named Little York by a vote of the miners, with the miners from New York and the East besting the miners from Missouri and the West, who wanted to call the town St. Louis.

With the arrival of a water ditch to facilitate mining in September 1852, the town continued to prosper. In 1867, an observer described the town as follows: “it presents a comfortable and attractive appearance from the fact that all the primitive buildings have been torn down or rebuilt, and neat, comfortable ones erected. The residences are nearly hid from view by shade and fruit trees. The citizens early took an interest in garden and fruit culture, and there are large yards filled with fruit trees planted in 1854. The prosperity and future prospects of the town have never been better."

For a few years, Little York was terrorized by a group of criminals known as the Decker family and led by Dick Fisher, who vandalized the stores of Jewish shopkeepers. In January 1853, Fisher was confronted and killed by Matthias "Tyce " Ault, after Fisher accosted a Jewish storekeeper in Ault's presence and then threatened Ault.

Indications of the town's prosperity include the arrival of a post office in 1855, and the completion of a good wagon road to Dutch Flat. The town was linked to Dutch Flat, Nevada City, California and other neighboring towns by stagecoach lines. in 1867, a new toll road linking Little York to Dutch Flat and You Bet, California was constructed. A public school was founded and a school house built. It had 26 students in 1861. The town had chapters of social organizations, including the Sons of Temperance, and the Independent Order of Good Templars and a company of the Union Guard.

Little York had its own election district. 48 votes were cast in the 1864 presidential election, 38 for Lincoln. 33 votes were cast in the 1868 presidential election, 15 for Grant and the rest for Seymour. In 1878, a 6 mile telephone line was constructed between Little York and Liberty Hill. The line was soon extended to Lowell Hill to the north and Dutch Flat to the east, a total of about 15 miles.

In 1880, an historian wrote that in "its prime the town contained two hotels, three stores, two saloons, 40 houses and a population of about 200." But after several fires In the 1870s that destroyed much of the town, including an arson fire that caused the explosion of a powder house, the town was reduced to “one store, one saloon, a post office, half a dozen houses and the houses, barns and shops of the Liberty Hill Consolidated Mining Company.

In 1888, only 11 people voted in the presidential election. With so few voters, its election district was abolished in 1890, sending its voters to You Bet. In 1886, the post office was closed and moved to You Bet. By 1924, Little York was described as "but a memory, and no large developing work is being carried on there."

== Mining ==
The Blue Lead gold bearing channel that runs through Little York was reckoned to be "[o]ne of the richest auriferous gravel channels in the Sierra." The channel was hundreds of feet wide and the gold lay buried in hard cemented gravel which had a blue sheen. The first emigrants to mine around Little York were able to pick nuggets out of the streams and ravines. Gold was even discovered on the town's public plaza, where one pan yielded $45. That was quickly followed by coyoteing, which involved digging holes into the ground to retrieve the gold bearing gravel and then washing it to try to release the gold. Early in 1852, the local miners enacted a series of mining laws under the rubric of the Blue Rock Mining District. At another meeting, the miners resolved that "no foreigner shall hold a mining claim in this district."

The richest area around Little York, Scott's Ravine which ran between Steephollow Creek and the Bear River, regularly yielded up to $20 per day to the hand. In 1854, it was reported that "Little York mines yield well. A company of four or five frequently take out two or three hundred dollars a day."

Because water initially was not plentiful, it was difficult to separate the gold from the cemented gravel to which it was bound. That began to change when the first ditch was built in 1852. Running 18 miles, the Little York or Gardner (sometimes Gardiner) ditch brought water from the Bear River. Other ditches followed, bringing water from Steephollow and from the South Yuba River. At the same time, some miners were drift mining, tunneling into hillsides and using explosives to break up the cemented gravel. In 1857, the stamp mill appeared and mining quickly boomed. Attributed to the Massasaga Company, the stamps crushed the cemented gravel before it was washed. Very soon, the area became a mecca for stamp mills, with 16 mills, totaling 136 stamps, reported in 1867.

As these and other improvements in hydraulic mining were developed, mining shifted from a labor-intensive to a capital-intensive industry, causing a drop in the area's mining population. Eventually, the Little York Water and Mining Company, backed by English capital, purchased a number of area mines and became the leading operator, centered in Little York. In 1879, it was merged into the Liberty Hill Consolidated Mining Company, which became the largest operator on the Lowell Ridge. In 1880, it was estimated that $20 million in gold had been extracted from Little York Township.

In 1876, farmers around Wheatland, California located on the banks of the Bear River near where it empties into the Sacramento River, led by James H. Keyes, sued the Little York Gold & Water Company to stop the mines from dumping their tailings into the Bear River. In 1879, the state court in Yuba City, California permanently enjoined the mines but that ruling was reversed by the California Supreme Court. However in 1884, federal judge Lorenzo Sawyer issued his decision, Woodruff v. North Bloomfield Gravel Mining Company, restraining the dumping of mining debris into the Yuba River and later extended it in a related case involving the Bear River. The mines of Little York Township never really recovered. One quick way of illustrating this is by comparing the assessed property value in Little York Township in 1860, $155,640, with the value in 1891, $75,010.

== Little York Township ==
Little York was also the name of Nevada County's sixth township created in 1852. At around 45 square miles, it was the second smallest of the original townships. It encompassed roughly the area between modern Highway 20 to the north, Highway 174 to the south, the Placer County, California line to the east and a line just to the west of Greenhorn Creek. Apart from its hub at Little York, principal towns included Lowell Hill, Red Dog and You Bet. The township had two elected justices and constables.

The township's population probably was never much above 1000 but it pulled more than its weight in gold production. By 1880, it was estimated that about 1/5 of the gold bullion extracted from Nevada County's hydraulic mines came from this township. Apart from gold, copper was also mined. The township was also noted for its lumbering industry, vineyards and fruit orchards. Louis Voss, Charles Kitt and the Towle Brothers were the principal lumbermen, each of them building a railroad to help get the lumber to market. As for horticulture, "[i]n the western portion of Little York Township, fruit crops are a certainty every year and the excellence of the production insures the highest prices in the market. In the higher altitudes the apple can be produced in unlimited quantities, and of unsurpassed excellence in all respects."

== Today ==
Little York lies in a remote and largely uninhabited part of the Tahoe National Forest. There is no organized mining. By 1918, "most of the gravel out of Little York ha[d] been removed." There are no readily visible remains of the town. Access is from Dutch Flat, since the Lowell Hill Road bridge across Steephollow Creek washed out in a storm in 1983.
