= Chicago Park, California =

Unincorporated community in California, United States

Chicago Park
- Unincorporated community
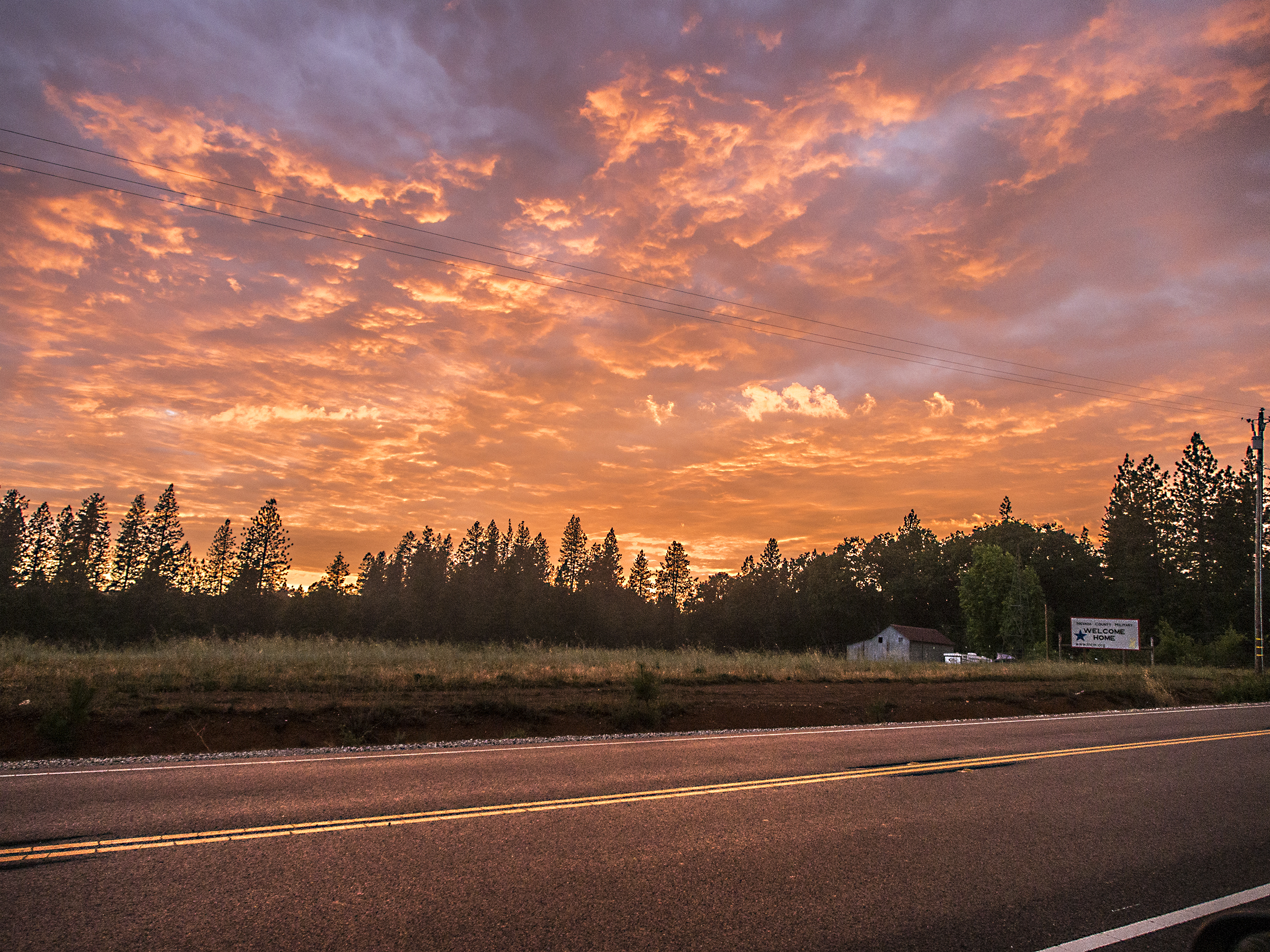

- Location of Chicago Park in California
- Coordinates: 39°08′43″N 120°58′02″W
- Country: United States
- State: California
- County: Nevada
- Named for: Chicago
- Elevation: 2,313 ft (705 m)
- Time zone: UTC-8 (Pacific)
  - Summer (DST): UTC-7 (PDT)
- ZIP code: 95712
- Area code: 530
- GNIS feature ID: 258262

Chicago Park (formerly: Storms Station) is a residential and unincorporated historic agricultural community in Nevada County, California. It is located along California State Route 174, with its center at the intersection of Mt. Olive Road. The neighborhood gets its name from its founding residents, who came from Chicago, Illinois to California in the late 1800s to grow fruit, which was often shipped back to Illinois for consumption. Chicago Park is about 9 miles (14 km) southeast of Grass Valley and about 3 miles (4.8 km) north of Colfax.

== Storms Station ==
Prior to the 1840s, this area was populated by the Nisenan, sometimes referred to as Southern Maidu. Emigrants to California then began to arrive. In August 1849, what is reported to have been Nevada County's second store was erected by a Mr. Findley on land overlooking the junction of the Bear River and Greenhorn Creek. One of the earliest settlers was Simmon P. Storms, who developed a ranch which, among other things, hosted sporting events such as wrestling matches and bear fights. A local newspaper reported "If you wish to seek a pleasant locality for spending the day, where after a good ride over a smooth road, where you can enjoy a cool and delightful lounge and excellent dinner, go to Storms."

In 1854, area residents led by Mr. Storms succeeded in having the Nisenan removed to a reservation near Tehama, California. During that period, Benjamin Taylor settled on a ranch in the area which he named Buena Vista, after the Battle of Buena Vista during the Mexican–American War in which he had participated, and engaged in farming and horse breeding. Others who settled in the area, such as the Louis Orzalli family, found it very suitable for growing fruit, especially pears. Joseph Shebley established a fish hatchery and picnic grounds. In 1883, he sold the hatchery to the California Fish Commission which abandoned it a few years later. Mr. Ambergh established a brewery. Gold mining was also prevalent.

== Shebley's hatchery ==
In 1883, the California Fish Commission established a hatchery on Joseph V. Shebley's ranch near Chicago Park after abandoning a previous facility at San Leandro. Shebley donated land and water; J. A. Richardson, formerly of the United States Fish Commission, served as the first superintendent. The hatchery produced rainbow, Lahontan cutthroat, and eastern brook trout, as well as landlocked Atlantic salmon, but limited funding and high transport costs led to its closure in 1888. The pond later became a popular recreation site for local residents and visitors.

== Nevada County Narrow Gauge Railroad ==
In 1872, the Coleman Brothers purchased the Buena Vista and Storms ranches, and other properties in the area, as they were developing the Nevada County Narrow Gauge Railroad, known affectionately as the "Never Come Never Go." Completed in 1876, the railroad connected the area to the transcontinental railroad at Colfax, spurring its agricultural development. Among other things, the Colemans established a saw mill and cleared land of trees to build the railroad and to feed the railroad's steam locomotives. Stations in the area were established at Storms Ranch, just south of present Lakewood Lane; at Buena Vista, just south of the present intersection of You Bet Road and Highway 174; and at Peardale. The Railroad provided a good means of transporting agricultural products to market. Still standing at the intersection of Mount Olive and Lower Colfax Roads is the Pacific Fruit Packing Shed, built in 1930 alongside the railroad tracks, to replace an earlier shed which collapsed in a snowstorm.

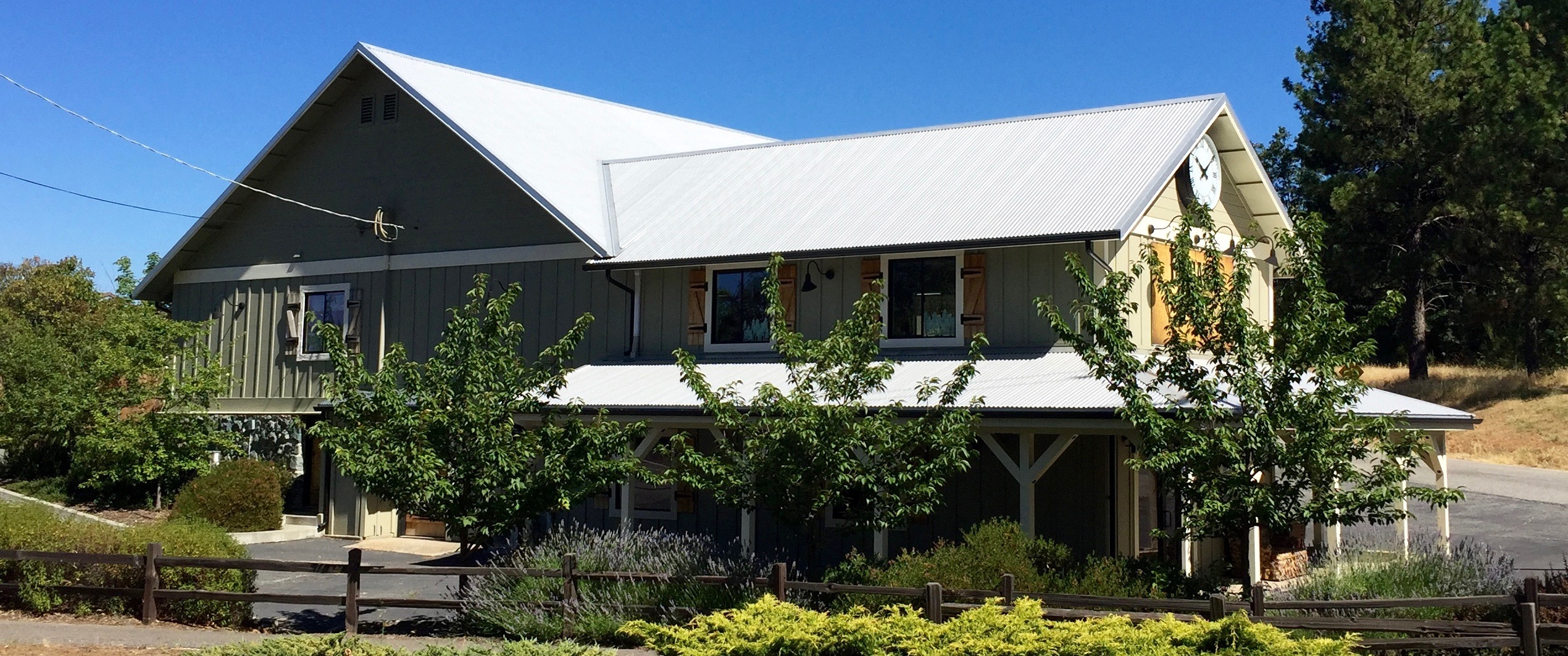
Chicago Park Packing Shed

The railroad also brought people to Chicago Park for recreation at sites such as Shebley's Pond. In 1908, the railroad was rerouted to run directly through Chicago Park, causing the Chicago Park station to be relocated close to where the packing shed now stands. The railroad was discontinued in the 1940s and the bridge across the Bear River was removed in 1963 to make way for Rollins Dam.

== Chicago Park Colony ==
In 1887, a group of Colfax and Chicago, Illinois developers led by Mssrs. Lobner, Hayford, Stafford, Briot and Porter, acquired several thousand acres of land and drew up plans for the Chicago Park Colony. The Colony was to consist of 20–40 acres (8.1–16.2 ha) tracts as well as town lots laid out around a public square with streets named for prominent streets in Chicago. Much of the planned development never materialized, but reportedly almost 7000 acres were sold, principally to residents of Chicago. Many of the colonizers found the weather too cold, given their expectations fueled by advertisements of sunny California. Many of the tracts were planted with orchards, and the area was referred to as the Bartlett Pear Belt.

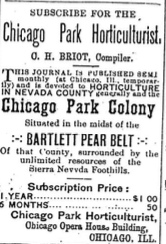
An 1889 Chicago Park Colony ad.

The railroad station at Storms Station was renamed Chicago Park Station.

One of the original developers, Dr. Charles A. Pusheck built a sanitarium and hotel in the Orchards Springs area of Chicago Park. It burned down in 1924 He and his mother were also instrumental in the founding of St. Paul Lutheran Church in 1904. Chicago Park also had a Catholic church.

A post office was established at the railroad station in 1888, with Joseph H. Hubacheck as postmaster. It moved into the Chicago Park Store when it was erected in 1915. In 1897 a schoolhouse was built. Telephone service, initially to Colfax, arrived in 1905. PG&E electric power arrived in 1930.

== Agriculture ==
Fruit was king in the area for about 100 years. Orchards growing pears, plums, peaches and apples were everywhere. Because water was not abundant, dryland farming techniques were mastered which improved fruit color. Reportedly, pears from Chicago Park fetched twice the price as pears from the Central Valley. In 1915, J.F. Siems' local Bartlett pears were honored at the Panama–Pacific International Exposition in San Francisco. As the 20th century progressed, pear blight appeared, causing some growers to switch to other crops.

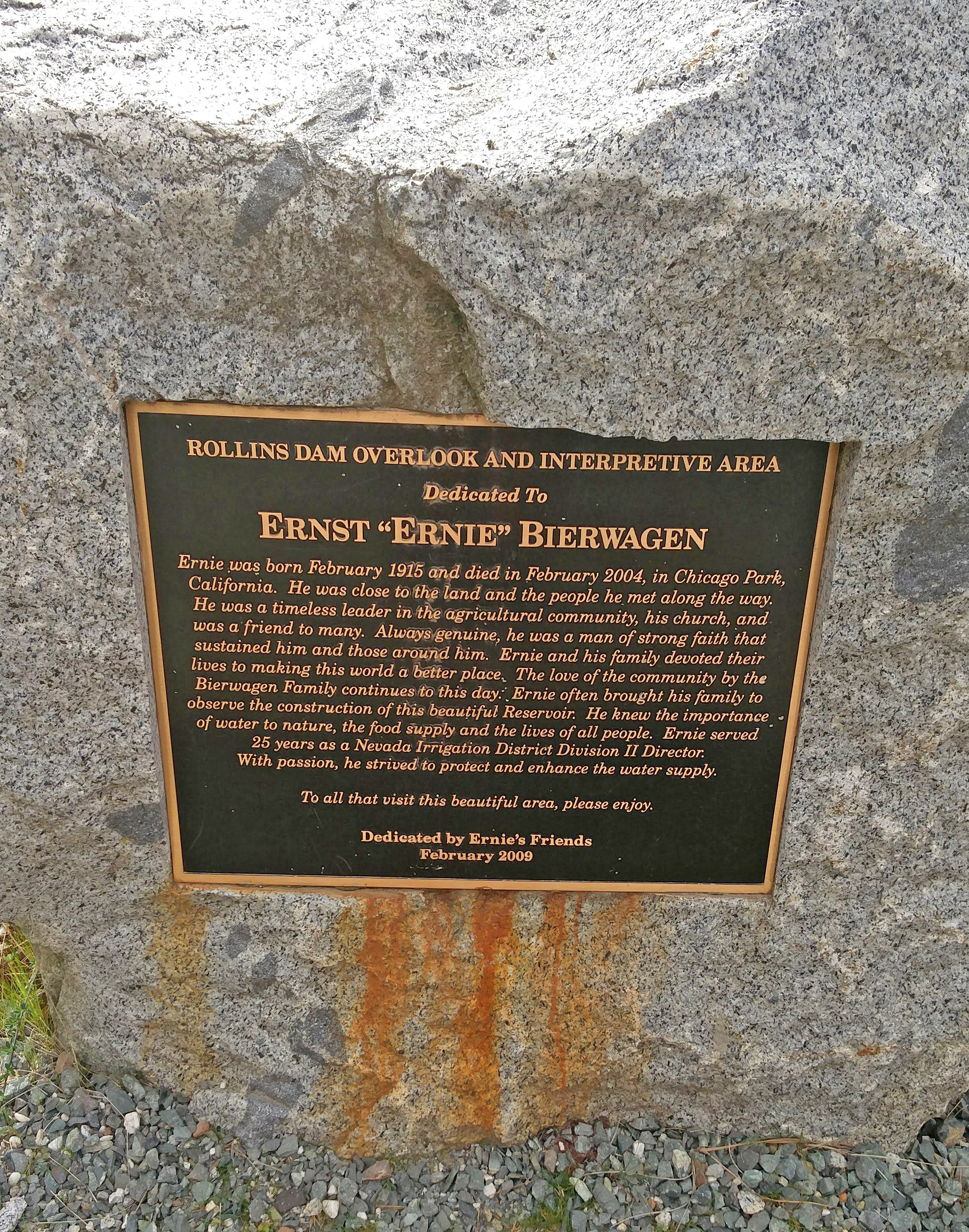
Ernie Bierwagen plaque

The Bierwagens are one of the prominent area farming families. In 1904, William Bierwagen bought much of the Storms Ranch. His nephew Ernie (1915–2004) was a leader in the local agricultural community. The Bierwagen family continues to grow apples and other fruit on the family farm in Chicago Park.

== 21st-century ==
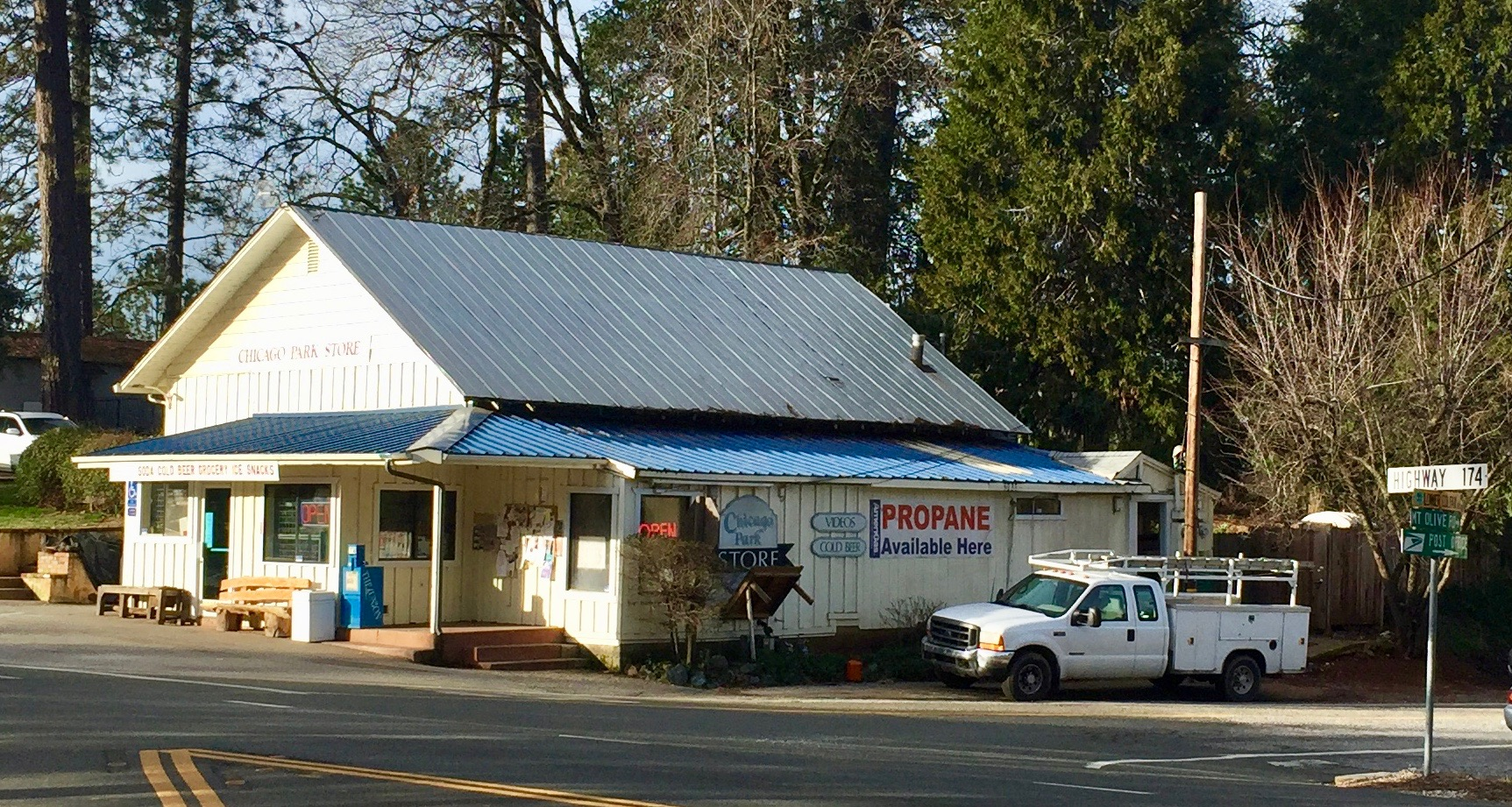
A Chicago Park store

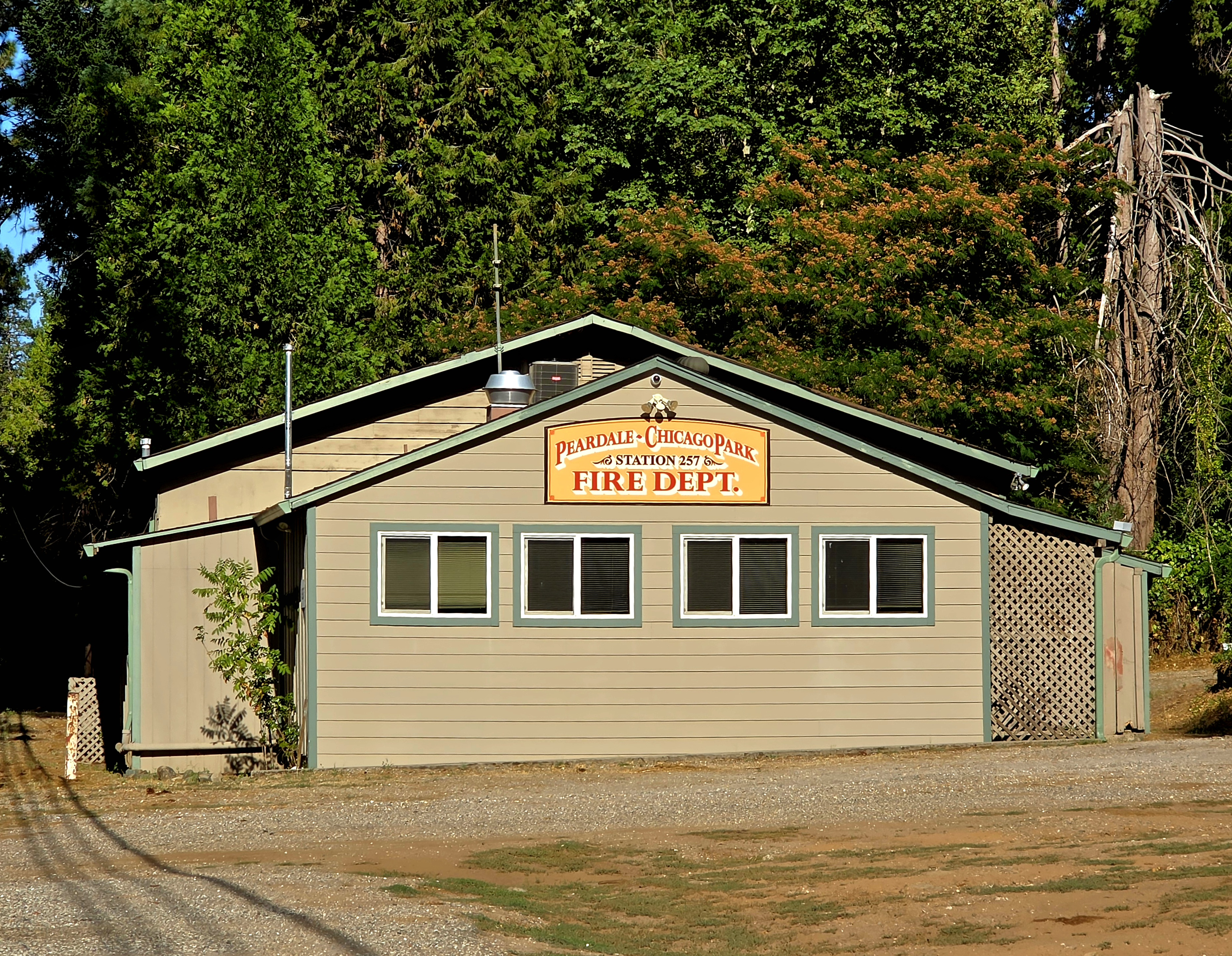
Peardale - Chicago Park Fire Dept. Station 257

Today, Chicago Park is a pleasant agricultural residential community. In recent times, a new school, post office, and fire station have been constructed. In addition to several private grape growers, a formal winery was established in 2000. Of historical significance are the Chicago Park store, the old schoolhouse, the St. Paul cemetery and the packing shed erected in the 1930s. Rollins Lake, hiking, and a number of fruit farms, including the Bierwagen Donner Trail Fruit Farm, in operation since 1902, draw visitors to the area. The only remaining evidence of the railroad are the flattened areas where the track used to lie.

== Sources ==
- Comstock, David; Zimmerman, Bernard (July 20, 2016). Exploring Nevada County: Historical Landmarks. You Bet Press. (electronic edition)
- Fred S. Cook, ed. (1965). Legends of the Northern Mines. Volcano, CA: California Traveler.
- Jones, Pat (April 1956). A Brief History of Chicago Park and Peardale, Nevada County Historical Society Bulletin. Vol. 17. Nevada County Historical Society.
- Jones, Pat (July 1973). Chicago Park, Nevada County Historical Society Bulletin. Vol. 27. Nevada County Historical Society.
- Jones, Pat (1983). The Chicago Park Connection: A History of Chicago Park and Peardale. Pony Express.
- Weeks, Clara A. (April 1956). Early Schools of Nevada County, Nevada County Historical Society Bulletin. Vol. 10. Nevada County Historical Society.
