= Waloupa, California =

Coordinates: 39.2012°N 120.8990°W

Walloupa (also, Waloupa) (Note: It is generally spelled Walloupa in contemporary accounts. It is also occasionally spelled Wallonpa.) was a historic mining community in Nevada County, located about 0.5 miles (0.80 km) south of You Bet. It was named by its white developers after a Nisenan chief, (Note: Chief Walloupa is known, among other things, for defeating a posse of miners looking to blame the Nisenan for some killings.) and should not be confused with the Nisenan village of Walloupa, which was located about 15 miles (24 km) to the west near Rough and Ready.

== Origins ==
Miners from Little York crossed Steep Hollow Creek and began mining in the area in the summer of 1852. Initial reports were that the area, which sits on an arm of an ancient gold-bearing river bed that stretches from the San Juan ridge southeasterly to Dutch Flat and Iowa Hill, was exceedingly rich in gold. As one paper put it, "[p]erhaps no claims in this part of the country have proved more profitable than those" around Walloupa. That winter, the local press reported Brown Company miners averaging US$50 per day, with three men taking up to US$1,500 on a good day. However, mining was hamstrung by lack of year-round water. Accordingly, Charles Marsh, a surveyor who had constructed a number of water ditches in the Nevada City area, joined by James Churchman and John McConnell, formed the Chalk Bluff Company to bring water by a ditch from Steep Hollow Creek. Delays in completing the 15-mile Williams ditch, as it was sometimes called, led to one contemporary report that in 1853 "Walloupa starved to death."

== History ==
The town got off to a slow start. Marsh surveyed the area and sold lots in Walloupa to "greenhorn speculators". The winter of 1852–53 was a harsh one, the town at times being snowed in, with snow damaging several houses, and food being scarce. Without water for mining, people began to leave. The owners of the Walloupa Bakery and Hotel put it up for sale so they could return to their home in the East. Yet enough stayed, so that when the ditch was completed at the beginning of 1855, the town entered its heyday. Soon, the town boasted fine houses, hotels, bars and stores. It was connected by stage to Nevada City. "Walloupa grew to a place of second-rate importance." While no accurate population figure can be found, in a September 1855 election, 55 votes were cast there.

== Miners strike ==
As noted above, the water ditch had been completed in early 1855. The following winter, the miners went on strike, refusing to pay more than 25 cents for a miner's inch of water. The ditch owners demanded 50 cents. The owners countered with 33 cents. The miners announced they would pay 25 cents and "nary cent over." The owners caved and the miners returned to work in the spring of 1856.

== Abandonment ==
Around that time, miners discovered richer diggings to the north on the other side of Birdseye Canyon. There, in 1857, Lazarus Beard opened a saloon in what became the town of You Bet, and within a few years, as the Walloupa diggins played out, the miners from Walloupa moved north and abandoned Walloupa. Newspaper references to Walloupa disappear after 1861, though it still appeared on Whitney's 1873 map. Today, there are no readily visible remains of Walloupa.
