= Hunt's Hill, California =

Hunt's Hill
- Former settlement
- Location within California
- Coordinates: 39°14′18″N 120°54′46″W
- Country: United States
- State: California
- County: Nevada
- Elevation: 2,904 ft (885 m)
- GNIS feature ID: 1682901

Hunt's Hill (also, Hunts Hill and formerly, Gouge Eye) is a former mining camp in Nevada County, California, United States. Hunt's Hill was located in the Sierra Nevada foothills about 6 miles in a straight line southeast of Nevada City and about 2 miles northwest of You Bet, on the north side of Greenhorn Creek, not far from the present intersection of Red Dog and Buckeye Roads. Hunt's Hill was founded in 1852 by a miner named Hunt. It was located on one of the deepest parts of the rich Blue Lead channel of gold-bearing gravel. In 1855, one of the mining claims established by some French miners, was “jumped". During the fight, one of the French miners lost an eye. Thereafter, that mine, and sometimes the town, were called Gouge Eye. By 1857, the town boasted two saloons, a hotel, a blacksmith and stable, a butcher shop, a boot and shoe store, and several grocery stores. In 1858, a stage line from Nevada City arrived. In 1866, seven cement mills for extracting gold from the “blue cement” were operating in the area. By 1880, the town was reduced to a combined store and saloon and a few houses. In 1895, one directory summed up the state of the community thus: "At the present time there is not much doing there." Since that same directory identified the town's justice of the peace and constable, what little happened must have been interesting. Today, it is just a historic site.
