= You Bet, California =

Unincorporated community in California, United States

You Bet
- Unincorporated community
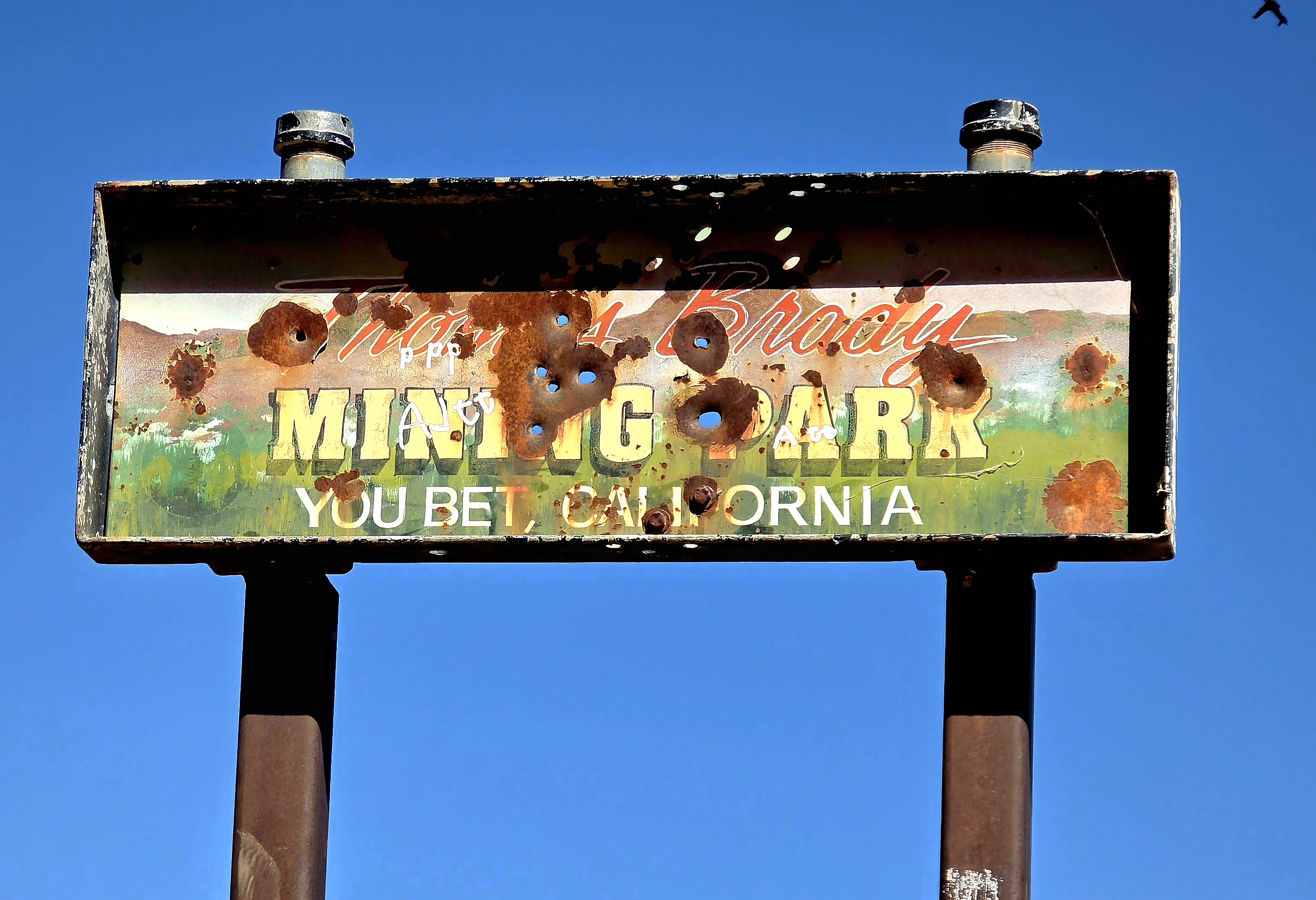
- Sign damaged by gunfire in You Bet, California

- Location within the state of California You Bet (the United States)
- Coordinates: 39°12′33″N 120°54′00″W
- Country: United States
- State: California
- County: Nevada
- Elevation: 2,910 ft (887 m)
- Time zone: UTC-8 (Pacific (PST))
  - Summer (DST): UTC-7 (PDT)
- GNIS feature ID: 1656416

You Bet is a small unincorporated community in Nevada County, California. You Bet is located in the Sierra Nevada foothills, 7 miles (11.3 km) east of Grass Valley and 5.5 miles (8.9 km) northeast of Chicago Park.

== History ==
=== Gold Rush ===
The mining town of You Bet was established during the California Gold Rush, principally by miners from across Birdseye Canyon in the nearby town of Waloupa, California, which itself had been founded just to the south in 1852. As its diggings played out, miners began moving about 0.5 miles (0.80 km) to the north, to the other side of Birdseye Canyon. Lazarus Beard opened a saloon there in 1857. According to local lore, the Waloupa miners gathered one day in Beard's saloon to name the new town. His favorite phrase was "you bet". Whenever Beard was asked about a proposed name, he would reply "you bet." After much drinking, the miners decided that You Bet sounded just right.

The town grew quickly. Soon, several stage lines connected it with Nevada City and other mining areas. By 1864, the town had 40–50 buildings, including hotels, stores, shops and saloons. That year, a schoolhouse was built between Red Dog, a mining town about 1 mile (1.6 km) to the north, and You Bet with monies raised by subscription. A post office was established in 1868 and served the community until 1903.

=== Civil War ===
During the American Civil War, You Bet was a strong Union town. In the 1862 elections, the You Bet vote was 121 for the Unionists to 6 for the Secessionists. In the 1864 presidential election, Lincoln received 86 votes and McClellan received 2.

On April 24, 1869, the town was completely destroyed by fire. It was rebuilt, in part with buildings moved there from Red Dog, whose diggings were playing out. However, on September 7, 1873, fire again destroyed much of You Bet. By the turn of the 19th century, many of the town's residents had moved north about 0.5 miles (0.80 km) to be closer to the diggings.

=== Mining ===
Mining drove You Bet's economy for over 80 years. Hydraulic mining (dislodging gold bearing ore from hillsides with water under high pressure) was prominent in the early days. Water was brought in by ditches and flumes, and the diggings were one of the largest in the state. The Sawyer decision in 1884 banned most hydraulic mining. It continued legally in areas where the mines could contain their refuse, or tailings. Local lore has it that it also continued illegally, aided by a telephone line from the Greenhorn Creek crossing which was used to warn miners that federal inspectors were coming so that they could turn off the water. Other miners turned to drift mining, tunnelling into rock and using explosives to dislodge the ore.

By 1918, an estimated $3 million in gold (about $175 million at 2015 prices) had been mined. Few people remained in the area, many having moved to work in the hard rock mines in neighboring Grass Valley. The town experienced a revival between the wars, and commercial mining continued until World War II. Since then, there have been periodic efforts to revive commercial mining when the price of gold soars. Occasional prospecting has never stopped, especially in the spring when prospectors look for gold washed down by runoff from the Sierra.

=== The Greenhorn Railroad ===
Logging was the other major industry in the You Bet area, which then contained, and still has, forests densely covered with pine and Douglas fir. Charles Kitts, lawyer and county recorder, owned or leased over 2000 acres of prime timberland in the You Bet area, much of it along the banks of Greenhorn Creek, and began logging in the 1870s. He built a sawmill near the confluence of the Greenhorn and Little Missouri Creeks.

Initially, Kitts moved his timber down the Greenhorn to the You Bet Station of the Nevada County Narrow Gauge Railroad, using teams of horses. In 1890, Kitts built a 2.5 miles (4.0 km) long railroad connecting his mill to the You Bet Station. Initially, the flatbed cars containing the timber were moved by a combination of gravity and horses. Later, Kitts acquired a steam locomotive from Louis Voss, who had a mill near Remington Hill a few miles north of You Bet and had built a railroad to move his logs.

Called the Greenhorn Railroad, Kitts ran his railroad down the eastern side of the Greenhorn, across the Creek on a "flimsy" trestle approximately where the current bridge is, then down the western side to the You Bet Station. The Greenhorn Railroad was one of the Narrow Gauge's biggest customers. The Greenhorn Railroad operated until Kitts exhausted his supply of timber. In 1912, the line was scrapped.

== Present day ==
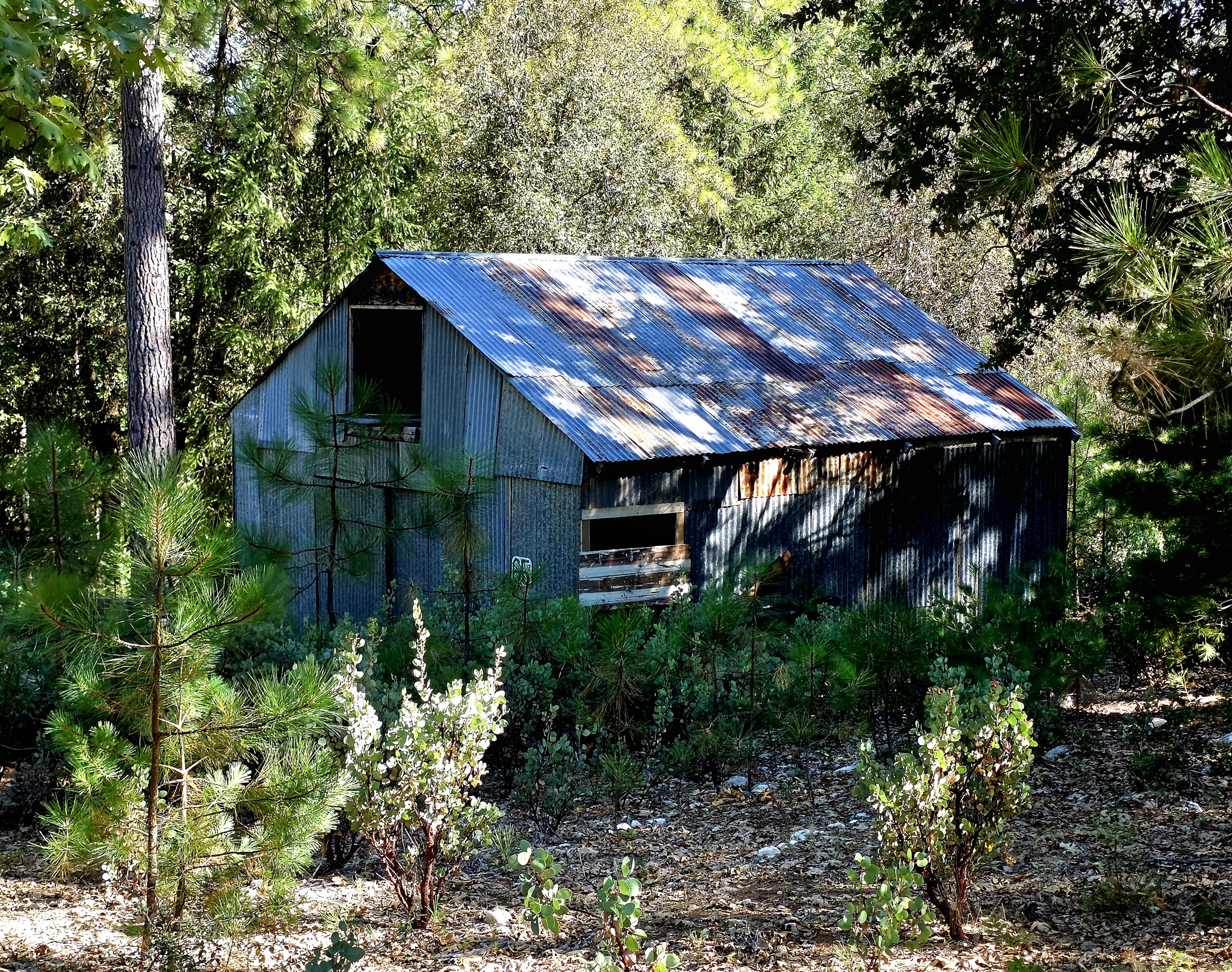
Metal building in You Bet, California

Today, You Bet is a community of about 50 residences located within a radius of a few miles from the old mining town. It has a community church, but no commercial establishments. It was declared a California Historical Landmark in 1975. All that remains of the Gold Rush era are the scarred diggings, some of the ditches, and the historic cemetery, which contains gravestones dating back to the 1860s. Interments were resumed in the 1990s. The last remaining historic building, the old schoolhouse, was reportedly dismantled in the 1960s by squatters looking for lumber.

== See also ==
- California Historical Landmarks in Nevada County, California
- Mining communities of the California Gold Rush
- Place names considered unusual
