= Chalk Bluff, California =

Chalk Bluff is the name of the ridge which lies between Greenhorn and Steephollow Creeks in Nevada County. It runs in a northeasterly direction for about 10 miles, and sits atop a "lead" of auriferous gravel, which intersects the fabled "Blue Lead" which runs from the San Juan Ridge through Red Dog and You Bet towards Placer County. It was also briefly the name for the mining camp that grew into the important town of Red Dog, then the name for a mining camp east of Red Dog. It received its name from the prominent chalk bluffs on the Ridge.

In the spring of 1851, the first prospectors to the area discovered gold just east of the confluence of what are now Greenhorn Creek and Arkansas Ravine. They called the area Red Dog Hill, after a hill in Illinois. They were soon joined by others, and on July 12, 1852, a meeting was held to select and name the town site. A majority wanted to call the town Chalk Bluff and locate it on Arkansas Hill. Others wanted to stay around Red Dog Hill and name the town Brooklyn. According to one historian, the "Chalk Bluffers, soon recognized the advantages of the Brooklyn situation, came over to the new town, and Chalk Bluff vanished from sight." With the arrival of a post office in 1855, Brooklyn was renamed Red Dog because another Brooklyn existed.

That said, by 1860, a mining camp called Chalk Bluff was established east of Brooklyn. The precise location of Chalk Bluff is presently unknown, probably because the site was washed away by hydraulic mining. It is believed to have been about 1 1/2 miles east of Red Dog and located on Chalk Bluff Ridge in the vicinity of the Hussey and Timmens mines which were about a quarter mile west of the present day Chalk Bluff Road. The town had a carpentry business and blacksmith shop, a saw mill, a saloon, Dr. Knight's hall, at which a ball was held on March 4, 1861, and a boarding house. The stage that ran between Nevada City and Omega stopped at Chalk Bluff.

"One of the most disastrous fires ever known in this county" swept across the Ridge in early October 1870. "The town of Chalk Bluff was saved only by hard fighting." However a number of businesses and homes in the area were destroyed or badly damaged. By the late 1870s, the town ceased to exist.

The name Chalk Bluff lives on as the name of the ridge which contained several mining camps. While Red Dog and You Bet, at the southern part of the Ridge, were the most prominent, others included Remington Hill and Democrat, further north. The Chalk Bluff Water and Lumber Company constructed a 19 mile ditch, at a cost of $28,000, to bring water from Steephollow Creek to the mines. Other ditches brought water from the Greenhorn. In addition to mining, Chalk Bluff Ridge was also an important source of lumber for Nevada County with Louis Voss, King and Wolford and C. W. Kitts operating major sawmills along the Ridge.

The Ridge had its own school district which in the 19th century, typically had over 100 students. The schoolhouse was located between Red Dog and You Bet. Most of the population melted away in the middle of the 20th century, with the decline in mining. Today, Chalk Bluff Ridge is a sparsely populated rural area, with scarred land and other evidence of its hydraulic mining days.
