= Rollins Dam =

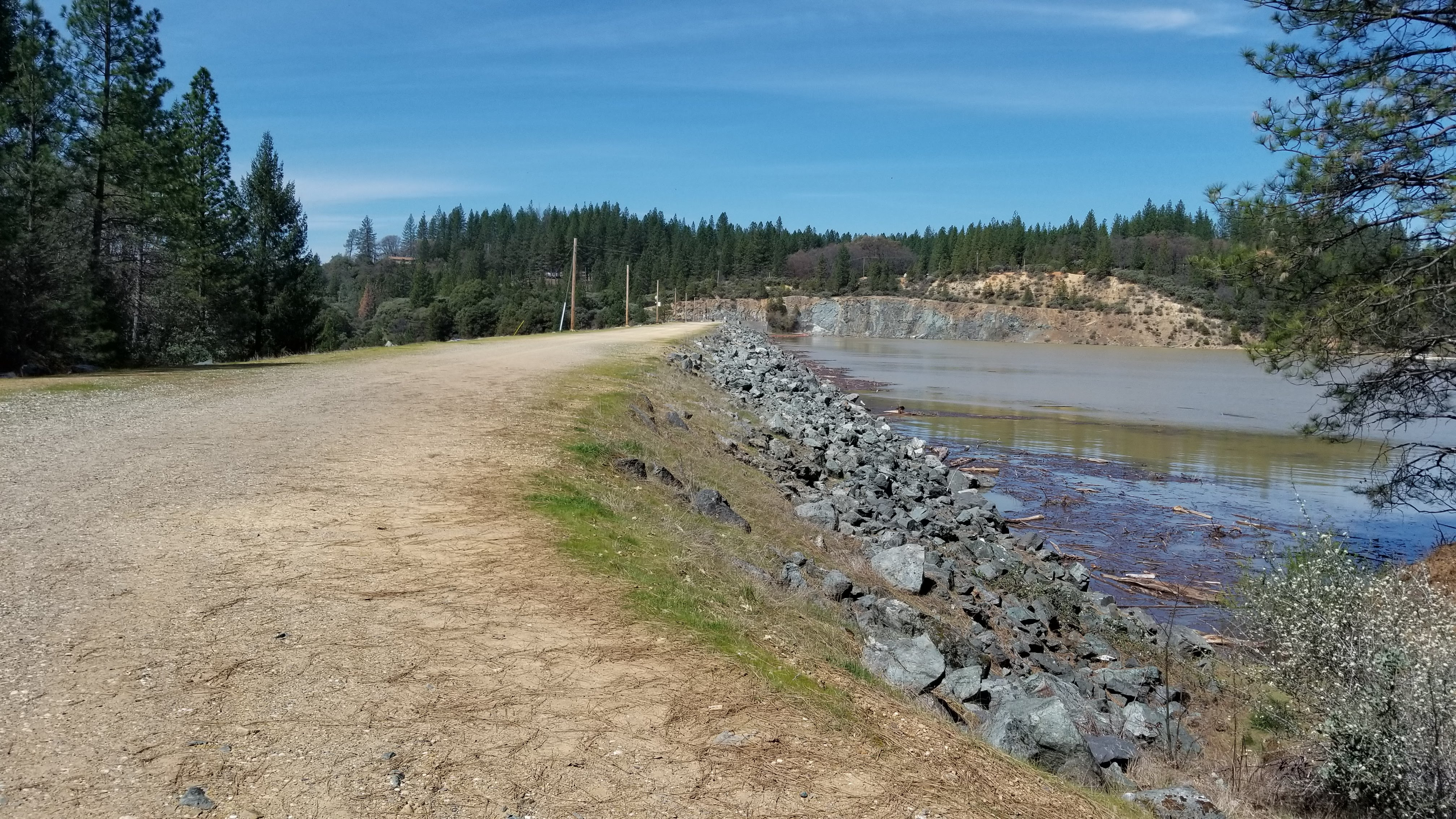
- Rollins Dam Eastern Side walk way
- Interactive map of Rollins Dam
- Country: The United States of America
- Location: Nevada County, California
- Coordinates: 39.13576°N 120.95233°W
- Purpose: Water Storage, Flood Control, Recreation, Hydroelectricity
- Status: Operational
- Construction began: July 1963; 63 years ago
- Opening date: December 1965; 60 years ago
- Owner: Nevada Irrigation District

Dam and spillways
- Type of dam: Rock fill–earth core dam
- Impounds: Bear River
- Length: 500 ft (150 m)
- Elevation at crest: 2171 feet
- Dam volume: 2450000 cubic yards
- Spillways: 1
- Spillway type: Ogee weir a concrete channel
- Spillway capacity: 60000 second feet

Rollins Dam (National ID # CA00255) is a dam on the border of Nevada and Placer counties in northern California, in the United States.

The earthen dam was constructed in 1965 by the Nevada Irrigation District, with a height of 228 feet (69 m), and a length of 1,840 feet (560 m) at its crest. It impounds the Bear River, a tributary of the Feather River, for hydropower, flood control, irrigation water storage, and municipal water use. The dam is one of the ten facilities owned and operated by the Nevada Irrigation District. The dam is part of the Yuba-Bear Hydroelectric Project.

The reservoir it creates, Rollins Reservoir, has a normal water surface of 1.3 square miles (3.4 km^{2}), and a maximum capacity of 66,000 acre-feet. Recreation includes trout fishing in the spring, and bass fishing in the summer.

The California Office Of Environmental Health Hazard Assessment has issued a safe eating advisory for any fish caught in Rollins Reservoir due to elevated levels of mercury.

== Construction ==
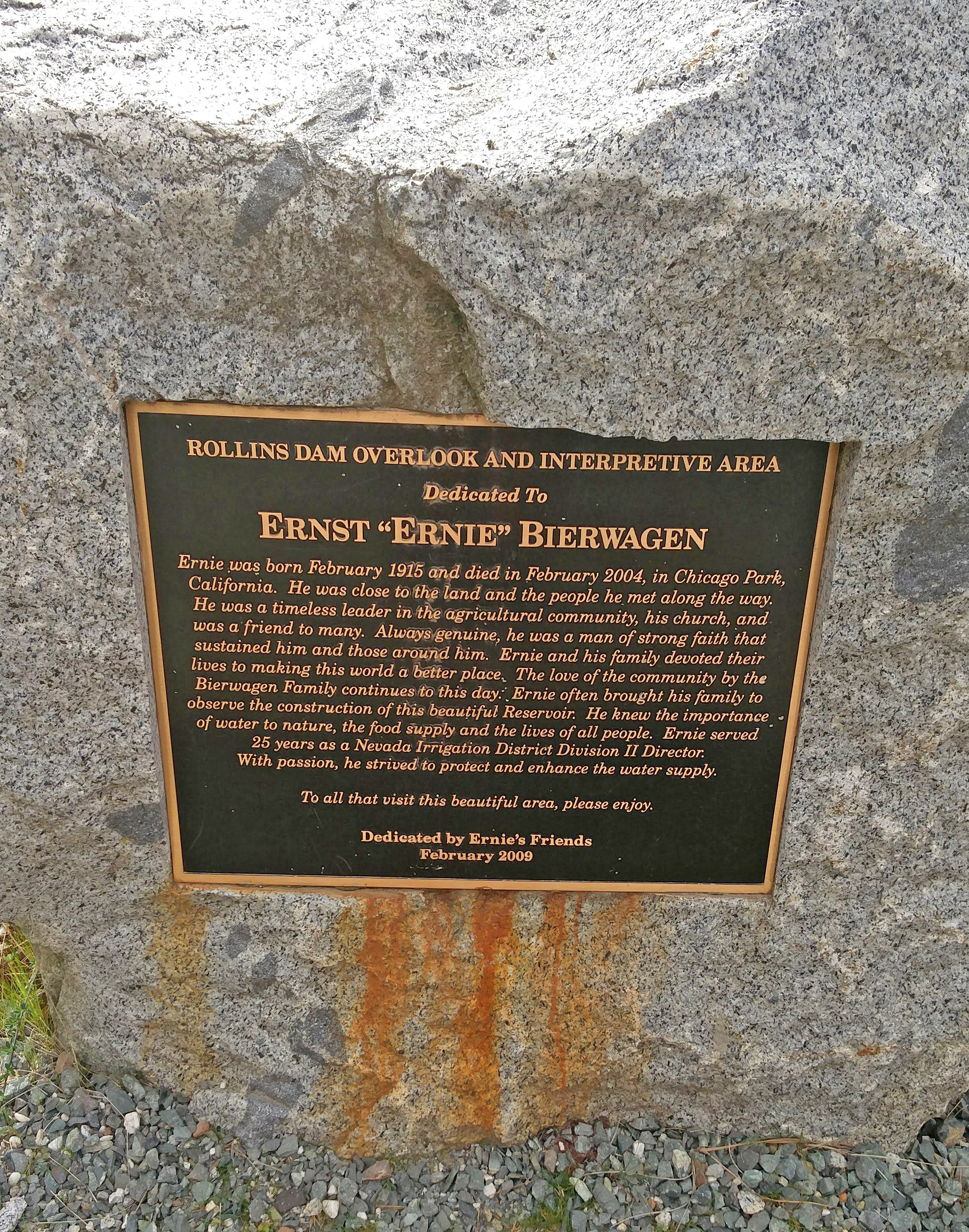
Ernest "Ernie" Bierwagen plaque at Orchard Springs Campground

Rollins Dam was built by Nevada Irrigation District as part of the Yuba-Bear hydroelectric Project in the 1960s. This project was created to bring flood control, water storage industrial/domestic, hydroelectricity, and recreation to the people in Nevada county. The construction for the dam began in July 1963 and finished in December 1965. An 810 foot long, 196 foot high trestle, named the Bear River Bridge, used by the Nevada County Narrow Gauge Rail Road to carry out $300 million of precious metals was demolished as part of the ground breaking ceremony for the dam. Design and construction was managed by Ebasco Services and the general contractor was Paul Hardeman, Inc.

Ernest "Ernie" Bierwagen was one of the directors from NID that oversaw the construction of Rollins Dam. His father helped form the NID in the early 1920s, and Ernest would spend 25 years of his life dedicated to the district, till he stepped down for medical reason. In the Orchard Springs's campground, on the west side of the dam there is a plaque dedicated to Ernest Bierwagen that states:

"Ernie was born February 1913 and died in February 2004, in Chicago Park California. He was close to the land and the people he met along the way. He was timeless leader in the agricultural community, his church, and was a friend to many. Always genuine, he was a man of strong faith that sustained him and those around him. Ernie and his family devoted their lives to making this world a better place. The love of the community by the Bierwagen Family continues to this day. Ernie often brought his family to observe the construction of this beautiful Reservoir. He knew the importance of water to nature, the food supply and the lives of all people. Ernie served 25 years as a Nevada Irrigation District Division II Director. With passion, he strived to protect and enhance the water supply".

== History ==
The earliest exploration of this area was done by the Spaniards in 1822, they named the river "Rio de Oso" meaning Bear River. Reports from 1866 show that there was a fish hatchery where the Greenhorn end of Rollins Lake is today. This hatchery was built by John Thorp and James Smith and was operated by the state. Evidence of old roads and mine tunneling can be seen when the water in Rollins Lake drops 80 feet in the summer months. More mine tunnels can be seen exposed along the Greenhorn area, through the trees and banks. Another mine tunnel site lies under the lake called the Numitor, established by Warren Pierce in 1884.

Rollins Dam was named after Dr. Jarret Laben Rollins, a physician and a prohibition leader. He saw the struggle that farmers were having with their crops and cattle because dry farming at the time was ineffective and unpredictable to the people. Nevada and Placer county came together and in 1921 the Nevada Irrigation District was created. With the establishment of NID existing reservoirs, dams and canals from the Gold Rush era became a part of the district. Dr. Rollins helped establish the Bear River Water and Power Company and after this the NID and the Bear River Water and Power Company would join and acquire many private systems. In 1962, the $65 million bond measure for the construction of the Yuba- Bear project was approved. Dr. Rollins would not see the end of the project as he died from a heart attack in 1933 and in 1966 a ceremony was held to dedicate the Rollins reservoir in his honor. Colfax records from the ceremony states:

"A giant stride has been taken in providing facilities through which innumerable opportunities for economic development, recreation and a richer life

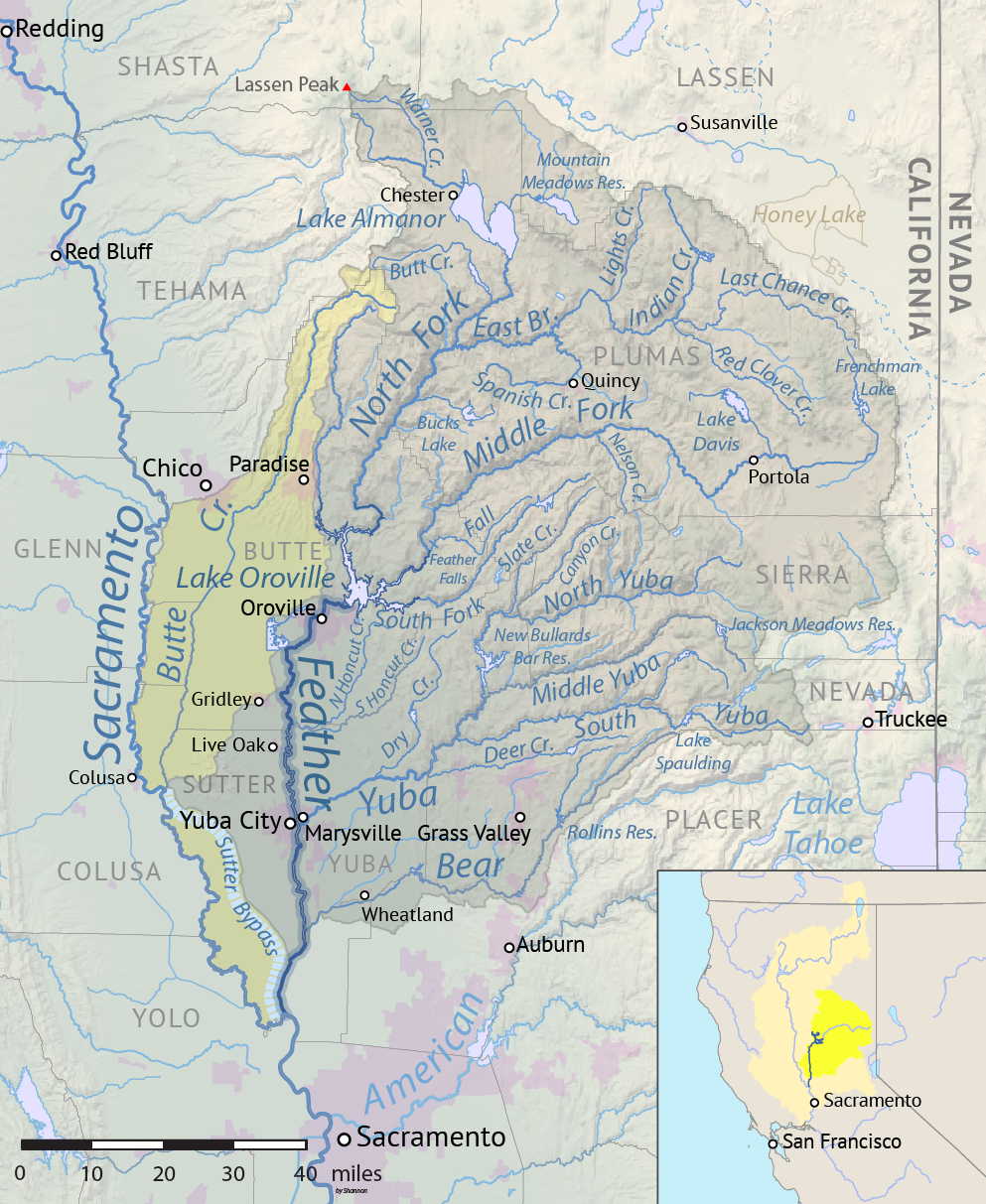
Map of the Feather River watershed; Rollins Reservoir is southeast of the town of Grass Valley.

will open to the people of the region, and during which the people of the district have assured themselves a great additional reserve of precious water".

== Recreation ==
=== Fishing ===
German Brown Trout, Rainbow Trout, Massachusetts brown Trout, Kokanee, Large Mouth Bass, Small Mouth Bass, Spotted Bass, Bullhead Catfish and Channel Catfish are available to catch in the lake.

The Office of Environmental Health Hazard Assessment or OEHHA has set guidelines for the consumption of fish in the Northern Sierra Nevada Foothills. These guidelines have been set as a result of the levels of mercury found in fish tested in the area. These guidelines are to protect the public from the health effects of methylmercury. For females and anyone younger than 17 years the recommended quantity per month is one of any type of Bass and two for Channel Catfish. An adult male may have two of any Bass and four of Channel Catfish.

=== Camping ===
There are various campsite locations surrounding the reservoir, such as Greenhorn, Long Ravine, Orchard Springs and Peninsula Camping and Boating campgrounds. These campgrounds are owned and operated by the NID. Combined these campgrounds hold about 250 campsites with a variety of services. The campgrounds have showers, picnic areas, volleyball courts, fire pits, bar-b-ques grills, and bathrooms. Campgrounds such as Greenhorn have a general store and an arcade. Annual kid friendly events are held on the campgrounds such as the Easter Egg Hunt and the NID kids Triathlon. Pets are allowed on the campgrounds for a daily fee, hunting and metal detecting is prohibited throughout all NID recreational areas as well as the cutting and removal of trees. The gates to the campgrounds close at 10:00 p.m. and reopen at 6:00 a.m. and are open all year.

=== Boating ===
Areas such as the Peninsula Camping and Boating and Rollins Lake Boat Rentals provide ski boats, wakeboard boats, pontoon boats and fishing boats for rental. Kayaks, paddle boards and canoes are also available for rental. Rentals are available for 3 or 7 hours, between 10 a.m. and 6 p.m. Personal watercraft that follow California boating laws and regulations are permitted on the lake.

== Hydrology ==
Rollins Dam is located on the Bear River, This river starts at 20 miles west of the crest of the Sierra Nevada in Placer County. The water from this river comes from the Drum Canal of Spaulding Lake, which is located on the Southern part of the Yuba River. The area where the water flows out of the Spaulding Lake and into Bear River is called Drum Afrerbay, it is also known as the Upper Bear River. Water then flows into the Middle Bear where the Dutch Flat Reservoir is located and then through the Alta Powerhouse. Water continues flowing down the river and just before reaching Rollins Reservoir it merges with Steephollow Creek, also known as the largest tributary in the upper watershed. After Rollins Reservoir the water then flows into Lake Combie, Wolf Creek, Camp Far West Reservoir and then joins Feather River South of Yuba City. This water will eventually flow into the Sacramento River at 20 miles northwest of the City of Sacramento.

== Hydroelectric ==
After the establishment of the NID engineers viewed the hydraulic gold mines of the area to be a significant accomplishments. When hydraulic mining ended in the 1880s many of these sites had been reestablished for water and power production. The NID began producing hydroelectric power in 1966 with the completion of the Yuba–Bear Power Project; the project only included Chicago Park and Dutch Flat. Smaller plants were created in the 1980s to take advantage of existing water releases including the Rollins powerhouse. The Rollins power plant generates a capacity of about 12.15 megawatts alone. With all of the NID power plants put together the plants generate 82.2 megawatts or on average about 375 million kilowatt hours of energy in a year. The NID then sell this energy to the Pacific Gas & Electric Company or also known as PG&E.

== Problems ==
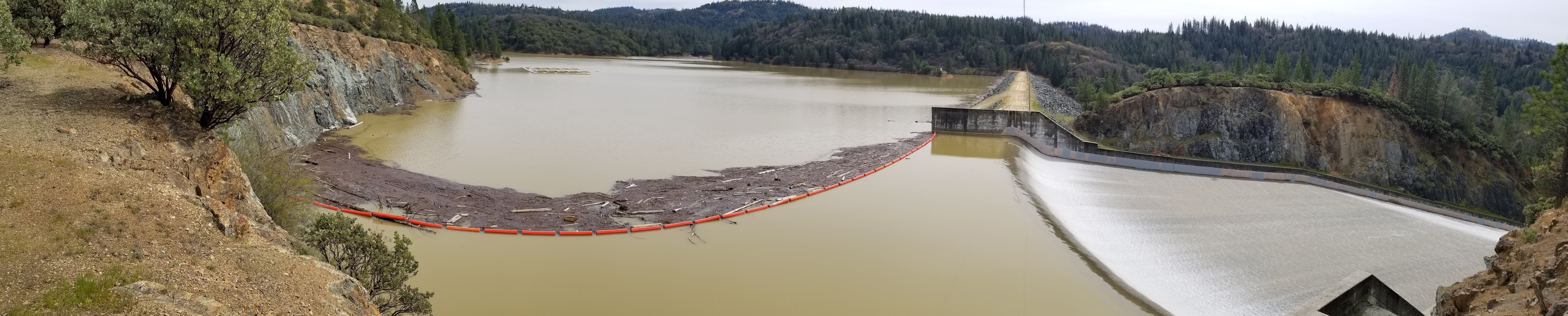
Rollins Dam and spillway

=== Broken valve ===
In 2017 after the Oroville Dam failure, the Sacramento Bee launched its own investigation on the conditions of 93 dams in California. In the inspection reports from the past five years, Rollins Dam had a not fully operational valve in 2014. The reports showed that the valve opened ~65% in 2014, ~88% in 2015, and in 2017 the NID approved for the replacement of the valve.

=== Sediment in the reservoir ===
For the past 40 years since the dam was constructed sediment and gravel have been accumulating in the reservoir. The sediment takes up valuable space that could be used for water storage. For years the NID has worked hard to prevent further build up. Studies found that about 3000 acre-feet of water storage space has been lost to sediment build up. The Bear Sediment Removal Project is a project to restore and maintain reservoirs along the Bear River that have lost some of their storage capacity from sediment. The sediment removal project at Rollins Reservoir would provide maintenance to the reservoir on an ongoing basis by the re-establishment of gravel skimming on Bear River and Steephollow Creek. The main location of the project is located between the Rollins Reservoir and the Chicago Park Powerhouse, about 6 miles N.E. of the City of Colfax covering Nevada and Placer County.

== See also ==
- List of dams and reservoirs in California
