= Middle Yuba River =

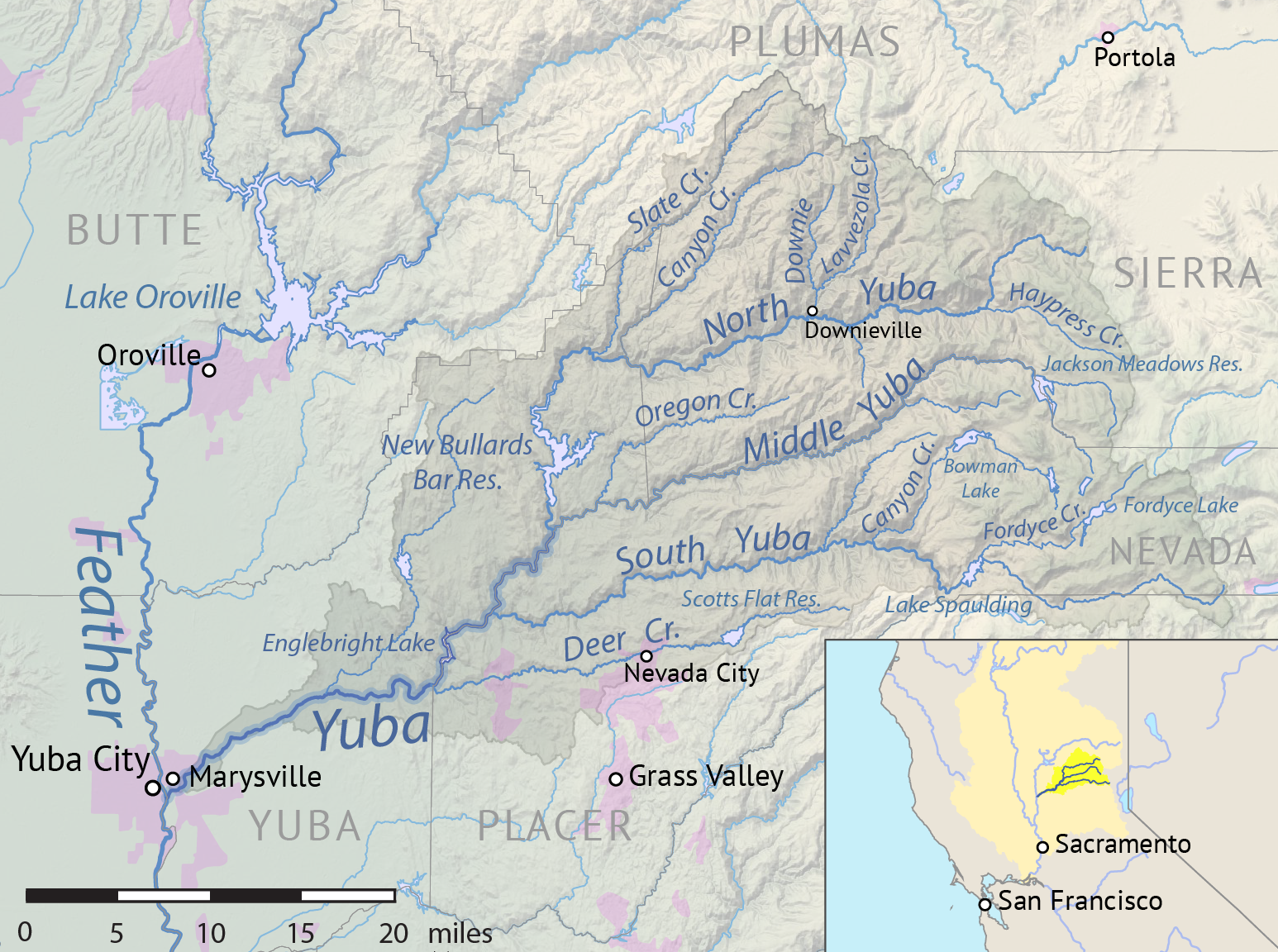
- Map of the Yuba River watershed, including the Middle Yuba

Location
- Country: United States
- State: California

Physical characteristics
- Source: Sierra Nevada
  - location: Tahoe National Forest, Nevada County
  - coordinates: 39°25′24″N 120°29′05″W
  - elevation: 7,320 ft (2,230 m)
- Mouth: Yuba River
  - location: North San Juan, Nevada/Yuba County
  - coordinates: 39°22′07″N 121°08′11″W
  - elevation: 1,129 ft (344 m)
- Length: 55.4 mi (89.2 km)
- Basin size: 198 sq mi (510 km^{2})
- Discharge
  - location: North San Juan, CA
  - average: 383 cu ft/s (10.8 m^{3}/s)
  - minimum: 15.5 cu ft/s (0.44 m^{3}/s)
  - maximum: 26,000 cu ft/s (740 m^{3}/s)

The Middle Yuba River is one of the three main forks of the Yuba River in Northern California in the United States. The river rises at the crest of the Sierra Nevada, and flows generally west through canyons to join the North Yuba River near North San Juan. The confluence of the two rivers forms the main stem of the Yuba River, which then continues west to join the Feather River. The Middle Yuba forms much of the border between Nevada County and Sierra County and in its lower reaches a small segment of the Nevada–Yuba County line. The Middle Yuba drains a remote, rugged portion of the Tahoe National Forest, with elevations ranging from 8,373 ft (2,552 m) at English Mountain to 1,129 ft (344 m) at the confluence with the Yuba River.

The river is dammed and diverted several times to provide hydroelectricity, greatly reducing the flow in all but the wettest years. Jackson Meadows Dam and Milton Diversion Dam near the headwaters are part of the Yuba-Bear Hydroelectric Project, which transport water to the South Yuba and Bear Rivers. Jackson Meadows Reservoir, stocked with 10,000 pounds of rainbow trout annually, is also a popular recreation area.

Further downstream, Our House Dam diverts water through a series of tunnels to New Bullards Bar Reservoir on the North Yuba River. Water is also taken from Oregon Creek, the main tributary of the Middle Yuba. This enables the generation of more power at the New Colgate Powerhouse, situated 4.7 miles (7.6 km) downstream from the confluence of the North and Middle Yuba Rivers.

The Middle Yuba River was a major mining site during the California Gold Rush. It was one of the areas most heavily affected by hydraulic mining, which washed large volumes of loose sediment into the river channel. In 1941 the Englebright Dam was constructed on the Yuba River below the Middle Fork to capture this debris before it could travel further downstream.

In 2008 studies were carried out by the Nevada Irrigation District, which owns Jackson Meadows and Milton Dams, to determine optimum flows for whitewater boating. This may ultimately result in the restoration of some of the natural flows to the Middle Yuba. The minimum required release from Milton Dam is 3 cubic feet per second (0.085 m^{3}/s), a tiny fraction of the pre-development flow.

== See also ==
- List of rivers of California
