= Emerald Pools =

Series of swimming holes and hiking trails in Nevada County, California

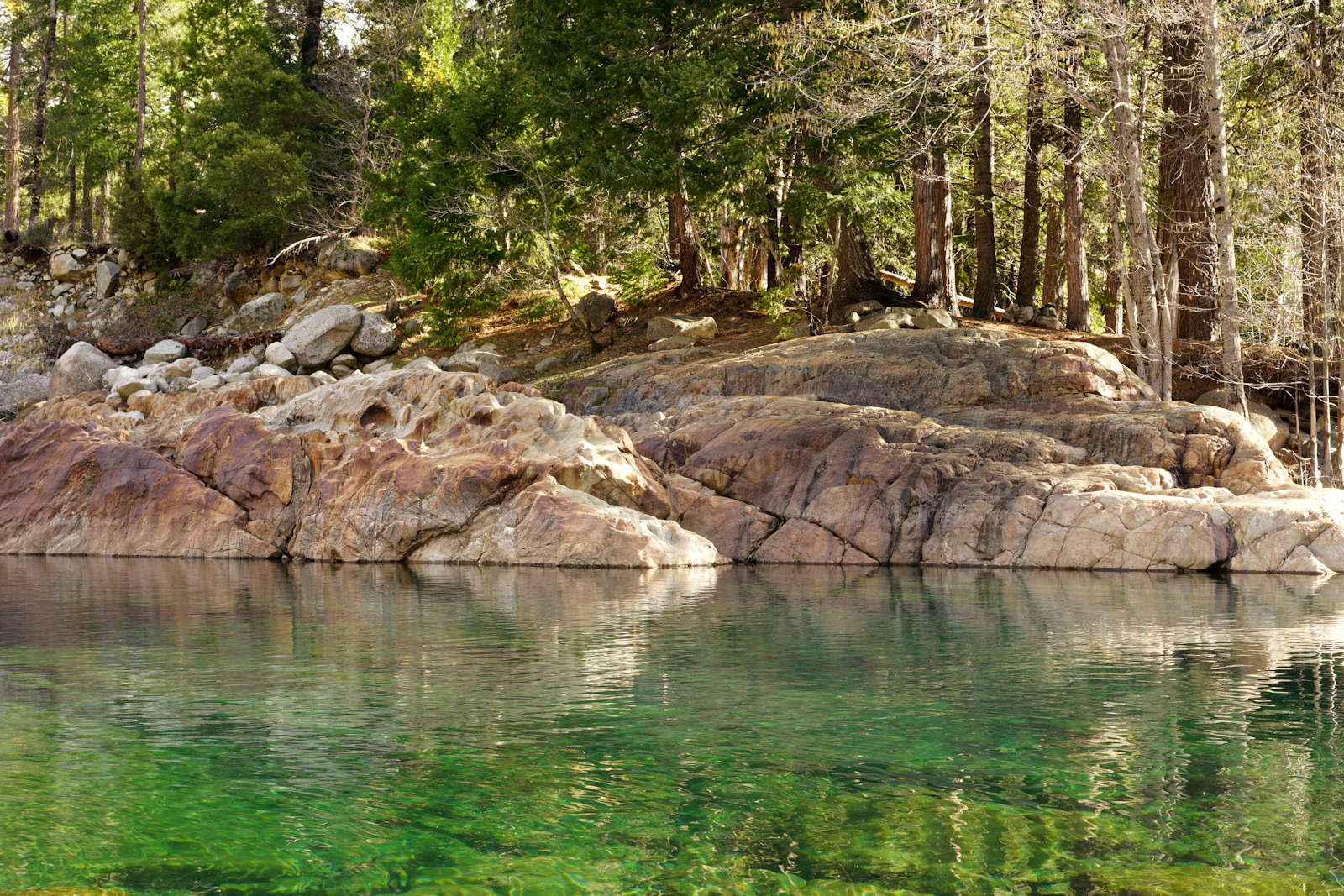
Emerald Pools

Emerald Pools Recreational Area is a series of swimming holes and short hiking trails located on Jordan Creek and the South Yuba River in Nevada County, California, and the Tahoe National Forest. Located downstream of Lake Spaulding, Emerald Pools sits at approximately 4,200 ft (1,067 m) above sea level. The Upper Pools are situated where Jordan Creek and the South Yuba River converge, near the former settlement of Langs, California. The Lower Pools are located 0.75 miles (1.2 km) further downstream of the South Yuba River towards Box Canyon at the base of a waterfall.

== Location ==
The Emerald Pools are accessible to the public via State Route 20 and Bowman Lake Road (also, Forest Route 18). Public parking is available off of Bowman Lake Road at Lang Crossing. The Lang Crossing Trailhead connects an area of public access parking to the short Emerald Pools Trail and the Upper Pools to the northeast. The Emerald Pools Trail is part of the larger Pioneer Trail. An unnamed trail heads West from Lang Crossing along the north side of the Yuba River, passing by the Lower Pools. While the Pioneer Trail continues along the south side of the Yuba River by Bowman Lake Road.

== Recreation and use ==
Emerald Pools has great scenic and recreational value due to its unique geology and water pools that attract thousands of people every year. Inter-playing rocks, boulders and water features such as riffles, waterfalls and rapids provide numerous opportunities for visitors to view and recreate. Recreational activities include swimming, sunbathing, fishing and hiking. No camping is allowed between Lake Spaulding Dam and Emerald Pools. The dramatic canyon setting of Emerald Pools and rugged nature of the slopes and waters also provides a sense of isolation from California's large cities. Native fish and wildlife of California also call the Emerald Pools area home. Some native fish species include rainbow trout, Sacramento pikeminnow, Hardhead and Sacramento sucker. Historic features such as the area's rich history in pioneering and the Gold Rush also contribute to the value of the Emerald Pools area while simultaneously adding a rustic feel. Nearby Washington, California, as well as historic Langs, California, and Emigrant Gap also add to the aesthetic value of Emerald Pools.

=== Dangers ===
The Emerald Pools area can be dangerous for those swimming in its waters. Local fire and rescue personnel frequently respond to the pools for traumatic injuries to swimmers and divers. Drownings in Emerald Pools are also frequent as waterfalls down the South Yuba River create dangerous undercurrents that unsuspecting swimmers may get caught in. Low water levels due to a large amount of the South Yuba River's flow being diverted away to irrigation and power generation may give swimmers false securities as the waters of Emerald Pools are extremely cold due to it being sourced from the bottom of Lake Spaulding. Additionally, sudden changes in flow levels due to storm runoff or increased flow releases from Lake Spaulding Dam could increase the severity of rapids and lead to unexpectedly rough waters.

=== Improvements ===
A number of improvements are planned for the Emerald Pools area, specifically at Lang Crossing. Plans include increasing the number of public access parking spots, delineating parking spots, and adding a toilet. These improvements are intended to keep the Emerald Pools area as a scenic and wild area in order to maintain its benefits for the enjoyment of the people of the State of California. However, another danger at Emerald Pools includes breaching the maximum visitor capacity of 90 persons at any one time. In order to reduce the number of people encountered at one time in Emerald Pools, plans to encourage visitors to travel to other, nearby locations have been made, as well as reducing total parking availability.
