= Yuba–Bear Hydroelectric Project =

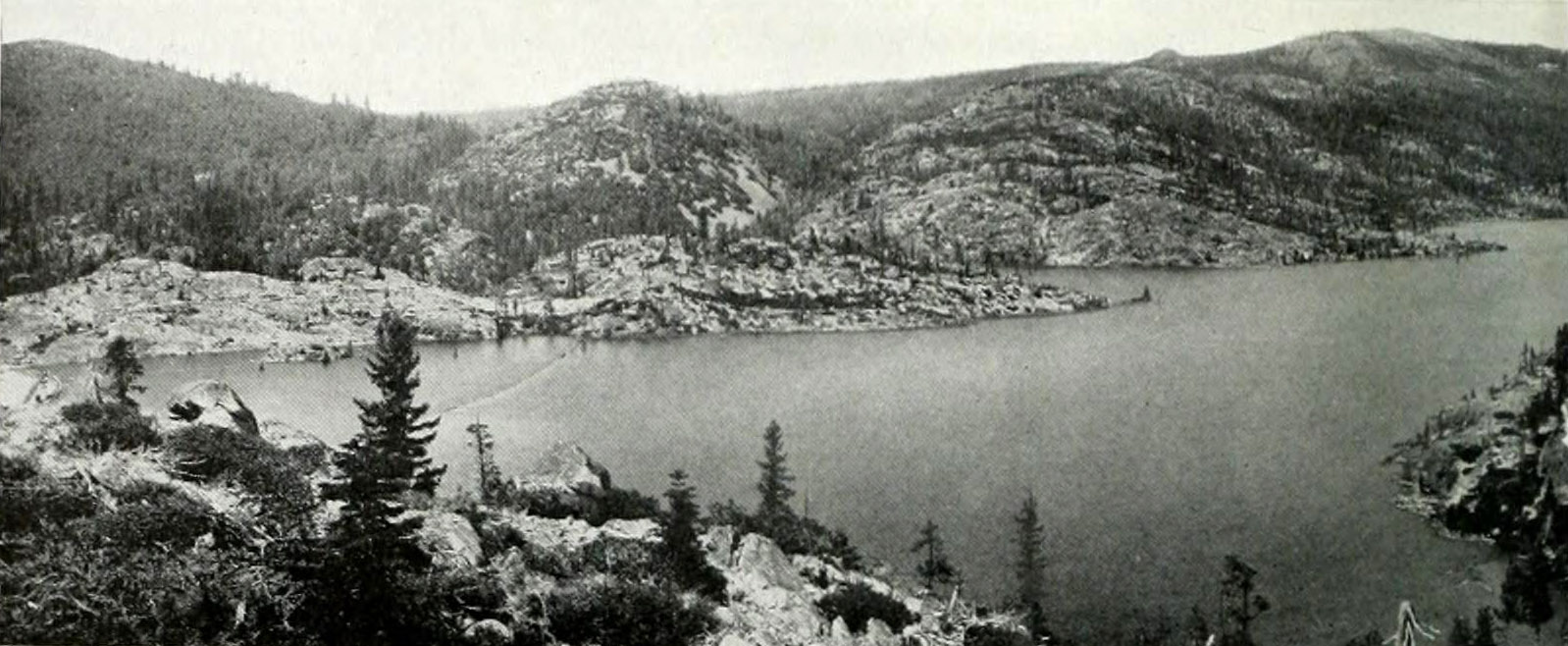
Lake Spaulding, one of the main reservoirs used by the project

The Yuba–Bear Hydroelectric Project is a complex hydroelectric scheme in the northern Sierra Nevada in California, tapping the upper Yuba River and Bear River drainage basins. The project area encompasses approximately 400 square miles (1,000 km^{2}) in Nevada, Placer, and Sierra Counties. Owned by the Nevada Irrigation District, it consists of 16 storage dams plus numerous diversion and regulating dams, and four generating stations producing 425 million kilowatt hours of electricity each year. The Yuba–Bear Hydroelectric Project consists of the Bowman development, Dutch Flat No. 2 development, Chicago Park development, and Rollins development.

== History ==
The Yuba–Bear project was incepted in 1962 when NID voters approved a bond issue to construct the system. Construction began in 1963 and was completed in 1966, at a cost of $65 million ($479 million in 2024 dollars). The Rollins Dam and Bowman power plants were added in the 1980s. The Yuba–Bear Project introduced additional canals, reservoirs, ability to generate power, and 145,000 acre-feet of water storage to be utilized by residents of the district.

== Geomorphology of the region ==
=== Geology and soils ===
The Yuba–Bear Hydroelectric Project is located within the Sierra Nevada mountain range, which experienced uplift beginning 3 to 5 million years ago, and contains faults resultant of tectonic collision during the late Paleozoic and Mesozoic eras.

This uplift and tilting of the Sierra Nevada created drainage patterns and channel incisions that shaped the landscape, including the Yuba and Bear rivers. Incision of the modern Yuba River began 5 million years ago, compounded by glacier erosion in the Quaternary period. The bedrock underneath the Yuba–Bear has a strong effect on the soils in this region. The soils include Mollisols, Inceptisols, Entisols, Alfisols, Andisols, and Ultisols.

=== Yuba River watershed ===
The Yuba River creates an incision through metamorphic bedrocks, including Mesozoic igneous rocks (granodiorite), Paleozoic phyllite, and slate from the Shoo Fly and Calaveras Formations. Over time, these channels were filled with Tertiary deposits of gravel, large boulders, and sands that were rich in gold.

The Yuba River has been heavily influenced by gold mining activity, with lingering effects such as abandoned mines, residual mercury sequestered in sediment, erosion, and alteration of sediment transport through the river system, with resulting consequences to channel structure. In addition to gold, major minerals of the area include copper, chromium, tungsten, and manganese. In 1994, mining of gravel and sand surpassed gold, with the Feather, Yuba, American, and Bear rivers providing a large amount of alluvial deposits for aggregate mining. The Yuba River has a high level of sediment supply, with a bed-load composed primarily of mining gravel as a result of intense levels of hydraulic mining that occurred in the area.

=== Bear River watershed ===
The Bear River displays characteristics of an "underfit" stream, indicating that it was formed by a larger river that had higher flows. The Bear River is located in a deep V-shaped canyon that suggests not only the work of a larger river, but also glacial advances that carved the topography and created this watershed. The Bear River has been severely impacted by hydraulic mining, and struggles with mercury contaminationleft over from the gold rush. The Bear River originates in the Tahoe National Forest, twenty miles west of the Sierra Nevada crest, and comprises three distinct sections termed the Upper, Middle, and Lower Bear River. The largest water body in the Bear River watershed is Camp Far West Reservoir, which Bear River feeds into before joining with the Feather River south of Yuba City. The Bear River supports popular brown and rainbow trout fisheries, and is popular among fly fishing clubs.

== Project features ==
The main water sources for the project are the Middle Yuba River, and Canyon Creek (a tributary of the South Yuba River). Jackson Meadows Dam stores water from the Middle Yuba, which is diverted southward through the Milton-Bowman Diversion Conduit into Bowman Lake, an impoundment of Canyon Creek. In addition to Jackson Meadows and Bowman reservoirs, the Yuba–Bear project derives water from fourteen smaller high elevation Sierra lakes, which have been dammed to increase their size.

After passing through Bowman Powerhouse, the water continues south via the Bowman–Spaulding Conduit to Lake Spaulding, which is part of the heavily interconnected Drum-Spaulding Hydroelectric Project owned by PG&E. Lake Spaulding is an impoundment of the South Yuba River, and is an important hub of the system as nearly all the water used by both projects passes through it.

Below Lake Spaulding water passes through Drum-Spaulding Project canals through Emigrant Gap into the upper Bear River, where it powers six hydroelectric plants on its long descent to Combie Reservoir the lowermost major reservoir of the Yuba–Bear project. The Yuba–Bear project operates two of these plants (Dutch Flat No. 2 and Chicago Park), in addition to a smaller powerhouse below Rollins Dam, as well as two powerhouses below Van Giesen Dam at Combie Reservoir.

Together with the Drum-Spaulding Project, the Yuba–Bear project is considered by the Federal Energy Regulatory Commission to be "the most physically and operationally complex hydroelectric project in the United States".

=== Yuba–Bear Hydroelectric Project ===
NID was granted the Federal Energy Regulatory Commission (FERC) license for the Yuba–Bear project in June, 1963. That license was set to expire and be up for renewal as of April, 2013. The four developments discussed in detail below compose the Yuba–Bear Project, with a total of 13 mains dams and 207,865 acre-feet of gross combined storage capacity. Accompanying this are 4 powerhouses, 4 water conduits, a 9-mile-long transmission line, appurtenant and recreational facilities.

==== Bowman development ====
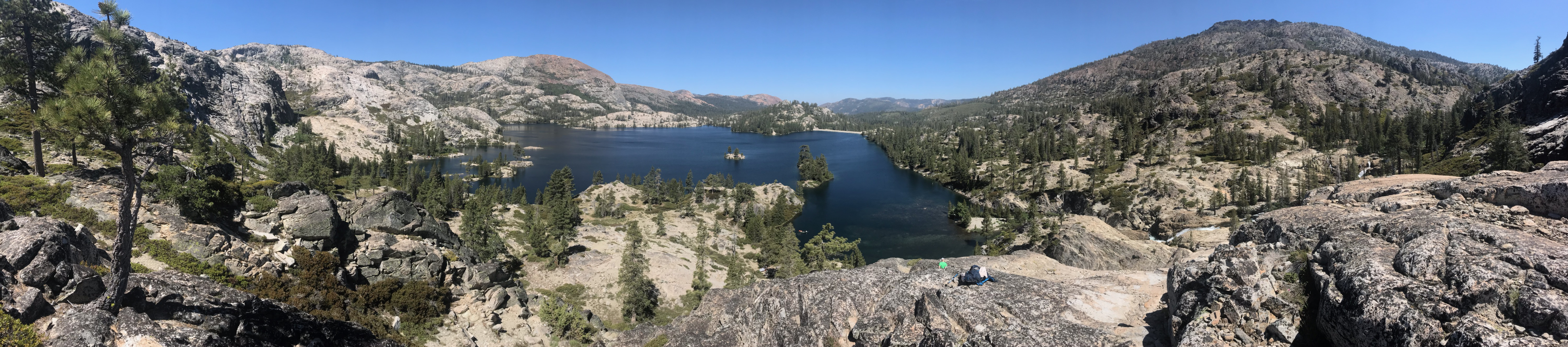
Faucherie Lake (3,980 ac-ft)

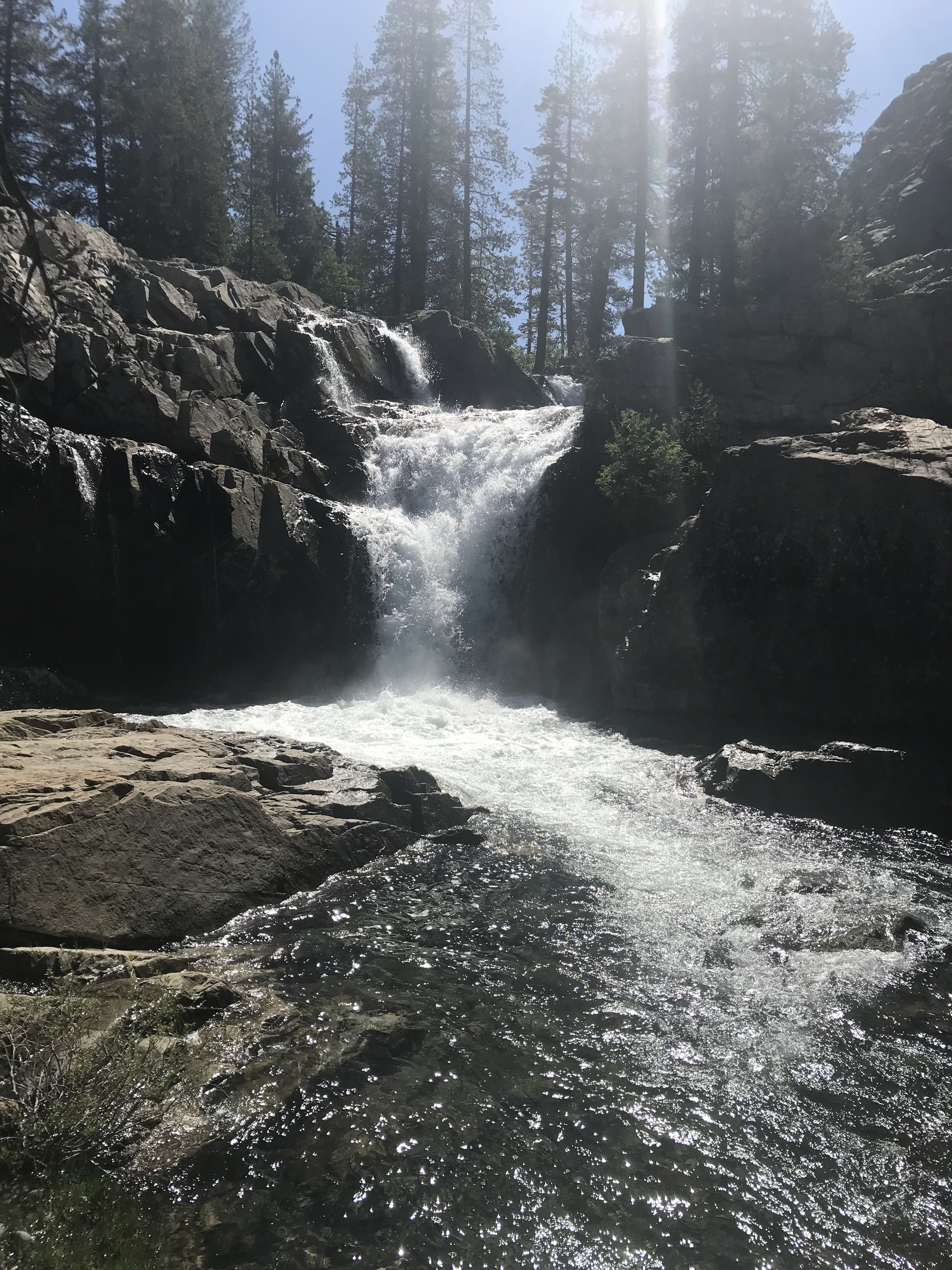
Canyon Creek, which feeds from French Lake and into Faucherie before making its way through Sawmill Lake and into Bowman

The first installment of the Yuba–Bear project is the Bowman development. It begins with the Jackson Meadows Dam, which is located 45.6 miles up on the Middle Yuba River from where it joins with the North Yuba River. This includes the Jackson Meadows Dam Spillway and Reservoir. The Jackson Meadows Reservoir is man-made, with a surface area of 1,054 acres, and storage capacity of 69,205 ac-ft. Jackson Meadows Reservoir Recreation Area offers a combined 282 camping sites spread out over eight different campgrounds. Downstream of Jackson Meadows, located 42.2 miles upstream of where the Middle Yuba meets the North Yuba, is the Milton Main Diversion Dam, Milton South Diversion Dam, the Milton Diversion Dam Spillway, and the Milton Diversion Impoundment. The Milton Reservoir has a surface area of 103 acres, and 295 ac-ft of storage capacity. Not to be confused with Jackson Meadows, is Jackson Dam. This is located on Jackson Creek, 2.9 miles upstream from Bowman Lake. Jackson Dam is an earth-filled dam accompanied by the Jackson Dam Spillway and Jackson Dam Lake, which has 58 acres of surface area and 1,330 ac-ft of storage capacity. Jackson Creek Campground has 13 available camping sites.

The remaining impoundments contributing to the Bowman Development are on Canyon Creek. The first of these is French Dam, a rockfill dam, followed by French Dam Spillway and French Lake. French Lake has 356 acres of surface area and 13,940 ac-ft storage capacity. Next is Faucherie Dam, Spillway, and Lake, with 143 acres surface area and 3,980 ac-ft storage. Faucherie Lake Recreation Area contains 25 campsites and a day-use area. Sawmill Dam is another rockfill dam, and the last impoundment of Canyon Creek before reaching Bowman Lake. Sawmill Dam Spillway and Lake allow for 3,030 ac-ft storage capacity, and create 79.4 acres of surface area.

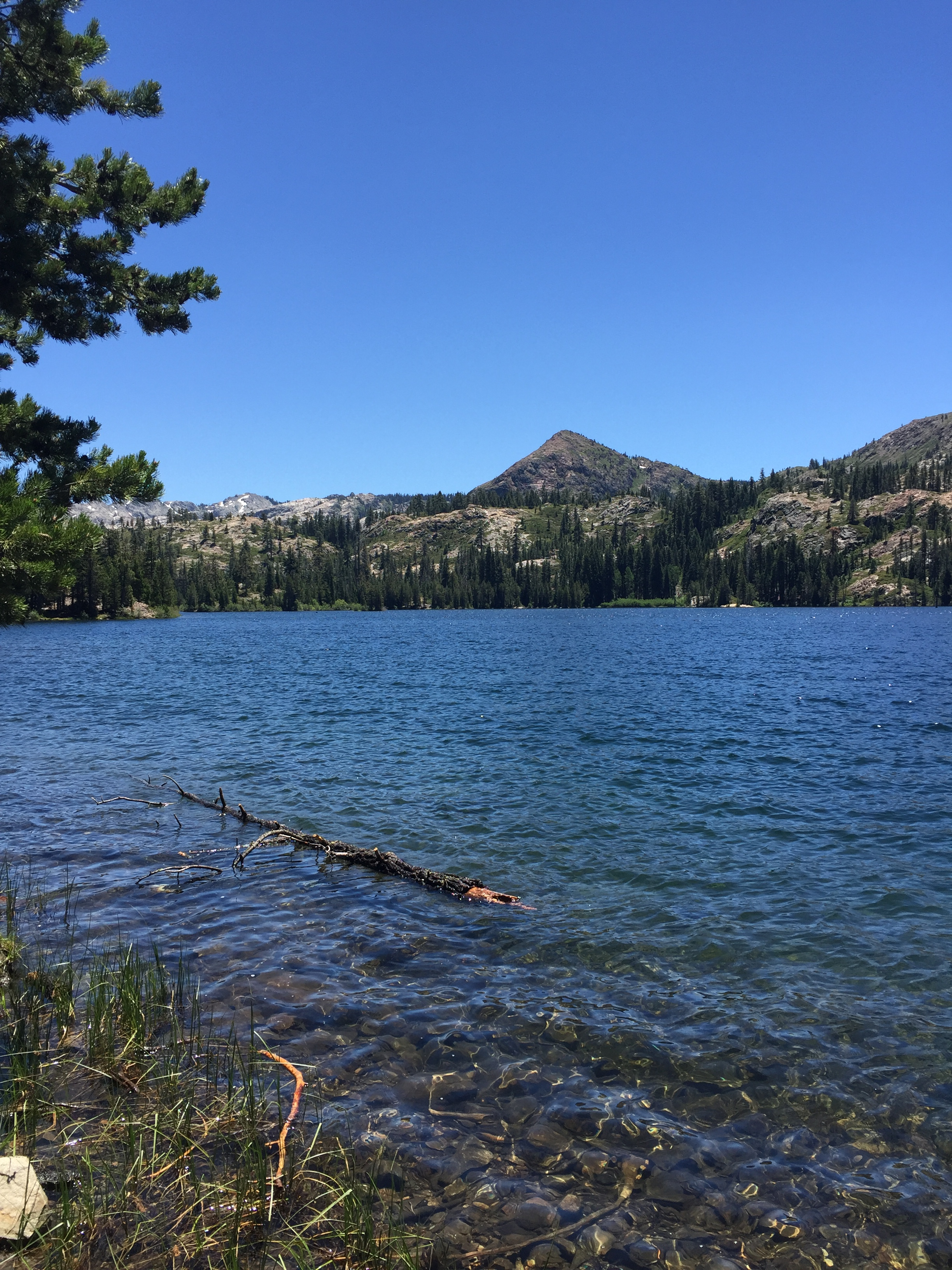
Sawmill Lake (3,030 ac-ft)

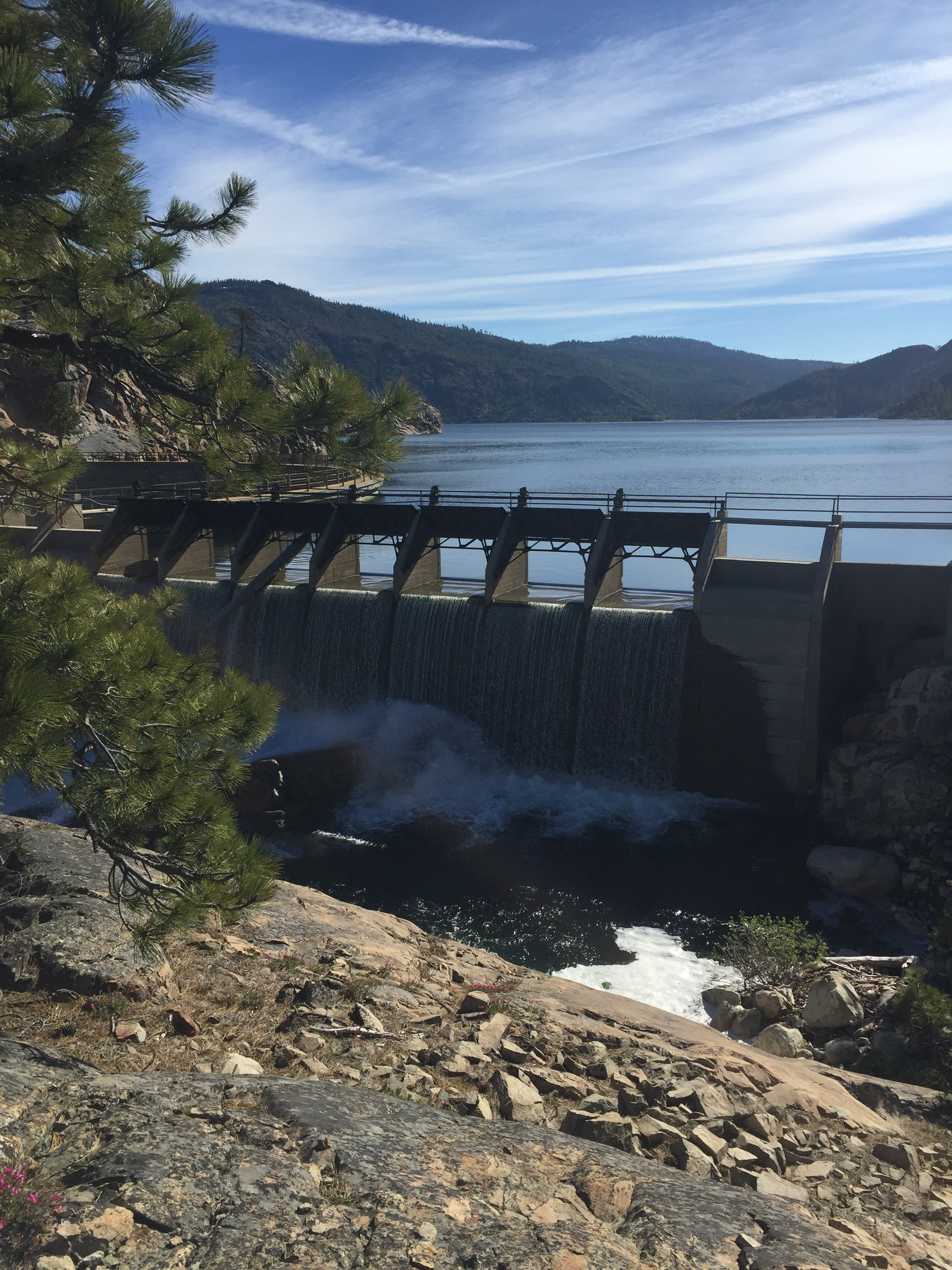
Bowman Dam spillway

Bowman Lake is formed on Canyon Creek by Bowman North Dam, and Bowman South Dam and Spillway. Bowman Lake has a surface area of 820 acres, and 68,510 ac-ft of storage capacity. The Bowman Penstock, Powerhouse, Switchyard, and Transmission Line originate here, with the Transmission Line connecting the Bowman Development to the Drum-Spaulding Project run by PG&E. Bowman Campground has 10 camping sites.

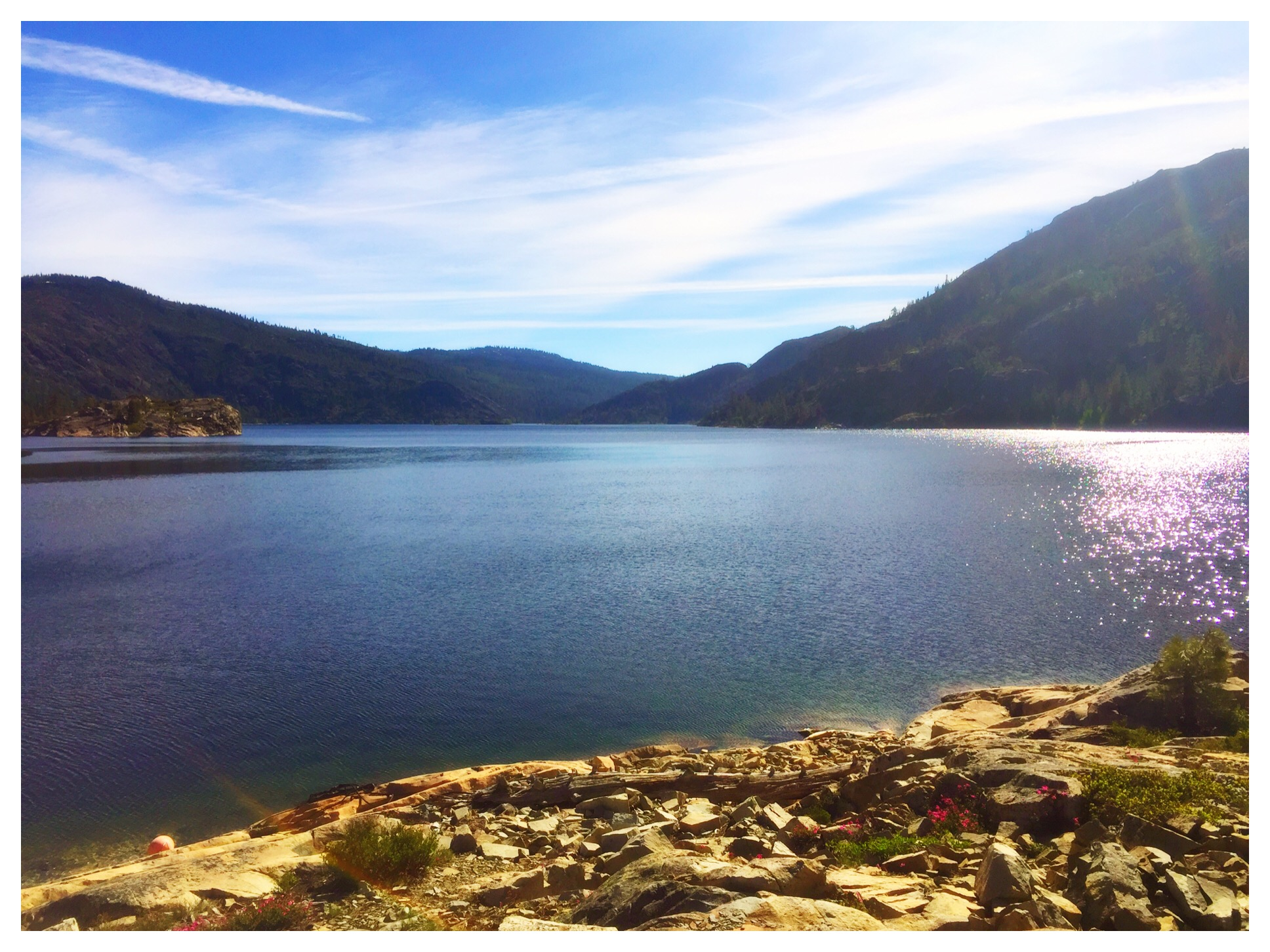
Bowman Lake (68,510 ac-ft)

==== Dutch Flat No. 2 development ====
Water reaches the Dutch Flat Development by way of the Bowman-Spaulding Conduit. This diverts flow from Canyon Creek below Bowman Lake through 40,501 feet of flumes and canals, and through 16,192 feet of tunnels. Texas Creek Diversion Dam and Fall Creek Diversion Dam also redirect portions of Canyon Creek flow into the Bowman-Spaulding Conduit. The Dutch Flat No. 2 Conduit is a combination of flume, tunnel, siphon, and canal that takes water from PG&E's Drum-Spaulding Project (at Drum Afterbay), and channels it into Dutch Flat No. 2 Forebay. The Dutch Flat Forebay Dam is an off-stream earthfilled embankment dam adjacent to the Bear River. The Dutch Flat Forebay Dam Spillway leads to Dutch Flat Forebay, a reservoir adjacent to the Bear River with a surface area of 8 acres and 185 ac-ft storage capacity. The remaining components of the Dutch Flat Development are Dutch Flat No. 2 Powerhouse Penstock, Dutch Flat No. 2 Powerhouse, and Dutch Flat No. 2 Powerhouse Switchyard.

==== Chicago Park development ====
Six miles upstream from where the Bear River meets Rollins Reservoir, is the Dutch Flat Afterbay Dam. The Dutch Flat Afterbay Dam Spillway discharges uncontrolled into the Bear River, and contributes to Dutch Flat Afterbay reservoir located on the Bear River. This reservoir has a surface area of 140 acres, and 2,037 ac-ft storage capacity. From here, the Chicago Park Conduit utilizes 21,700 feet of flumes and ditches to transport water to the Chicago Park Forebay Dam, an earthfill dam adjacent to the Bear River. The Chicago Park Forebay Dam Spillway allows water into Chicago Park Forebay, another reservoir adjacent to the Bear River with 7 acres of surface area and 117 ac-ft of storage capacity. The remaining components of this Development are the Chicago Park Powerhouse Penstock, Chicago Park Powerhouse, and the Chicago Park Switchyard.

==== Rollins development ====
This Development consists of an embankment dam on the Bear River known as Rollins Dam, Rollins Dam Spillway, and Rollins Reservoir, which has a surface area of 825 acres and 65,989 ac-ft of storage capacity. Rollins Reservoir also offers 332 camping site spread over 4 campgrounds. The Rollins Powerhouse Penstock, Rollins Powerhouse, and Rollins Switchyard complete this project.

=== Drum–Spaulding Project ===
The Drum-Spaulding Project is heavily intertwined with the Yuba–Bear project, and is run by PG&E. The Drum-Spaulding Project is composed of the following:

==== Upper Drum–Spaulding ====
Drum No. 1 and No. 2 Development, with generation of 105.9 MW. Spaulding No. 1 and No. 2 Development, generating 11.4 MW. Spaulding No. 3 Development with 5.8 MW, Dutch Flat No. 1 Development with generation of 22 MW, and Alta No. 1 Development that is proposed to retire.

==== Lower Drum ====
Halsey Development generating 11 MW, Wise Development with 14 MW and Wise No. 2 Development generating 3.2 MW, and Newcastle Development with 11.5 MW.

==== Deer Creek ====
Deer Creek development, generating 5.7 MW, including the South Yuba Canal, has been transferred to Nevada Irrigation District.

=== Yuba River Development Project ===
The Yuba River Development Project is run by the Yuba County Water Agency, and is connected to the Yuba–Bear Hydroelectric Project. This Development Project includes the New Bullards Bar Reservoiron the North Yuba River, two diversion dams (Our House Diversion Dam on the Middle Yuba, and Log Cabin Diversion on Oregon Creek), three powerhouses (New Colgate, Fish Release, and Narrows No. 2), along with various recreation facilities. The installed capacity of this Project is 361.9 megawatts.

== Uses ==
At maximum capacity, the project can generate 79.32 megawatts. Power is distributed under contract with Pacific Gas and Electric (PG&E). The project's reservoirs have a gross storage capacity of 203,865 acre-feet (0.251464 km^{3}).

In addition to hydroelectric power, the project significantly increases the water flow in the Bear River, the main source of NID's irrigation water supply.
