= Nevada City, California =

City in California, United States

- City
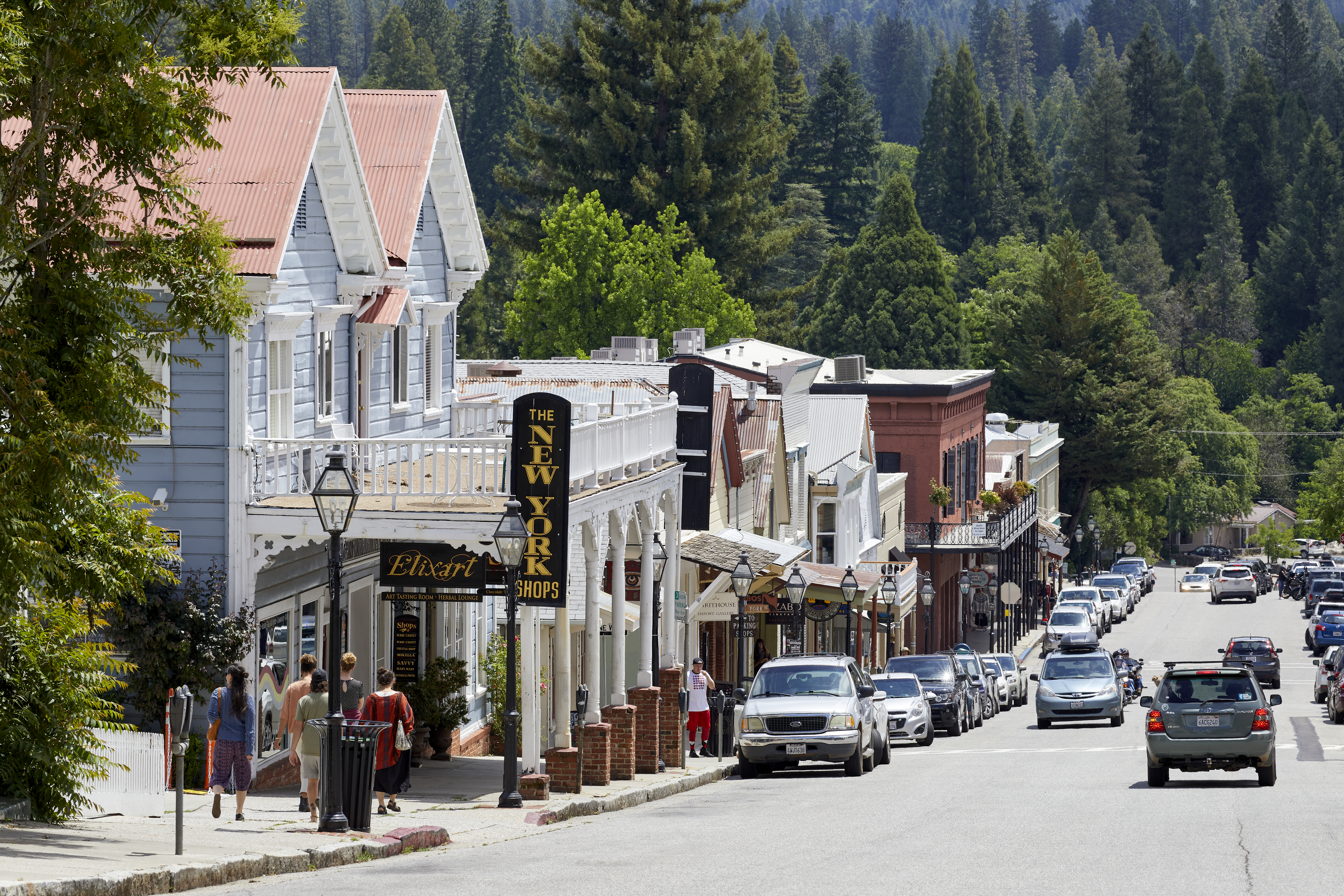
- Broad Street, Nevada City Downtown Historic District, in 2020

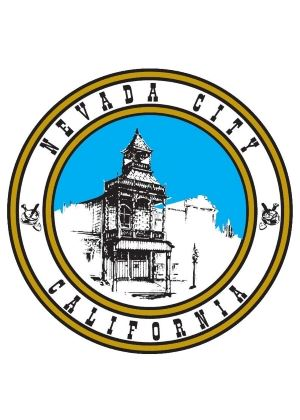
- Seal
- Interactive map of Nevada City, California
- Location in the United States
- Coordinates: 39°15′41″N 121°1′7″W
- Country: United States
- State: California
- County: Nevada
- Incorporated: April 19, 1856

Government
  - Type: Council-Manager
  - Mayor: Daniela Fernández
  - Vice Mayor: Gary Petersen
  - City Council: Adam Kline; Doug Fleming; Micayla Sortland
  - City Manager: Carrie Wright

Area
  - Total: 2.19 sq mi (5.67 km^{2})
  - Land: 2.19 sq mi (5.66 km^{2})
  - Water: 0.0039 sq mi (0.01 km^{2}) 0.17%
- Elevation: 2,477 ft (755 m)

Population (2020)
  - Total: 3,152
  - Density: 1,440/sq mi (557/km^{2})
- Time zone: UTC-8 (Pacific (PST))
  - Summer (DST): UTC-7 (PDT)
- ZIP code: 95959
- Area codes: 530, 837
- FIPS code: 06-50874
- GNIS feature IDs: 1659211, 2411225
- Website: www.nevadacityca.gov

Nevada City is a city in and the county seat of Nevada County, California, United States, 60 miles (97 km) northeast of Sacramento, 84 miles (135 km) southwest of Reno and 147 miles (237 km) northeast of San Francisco. The population was 3,152 as of the 2020 census.

== History ==
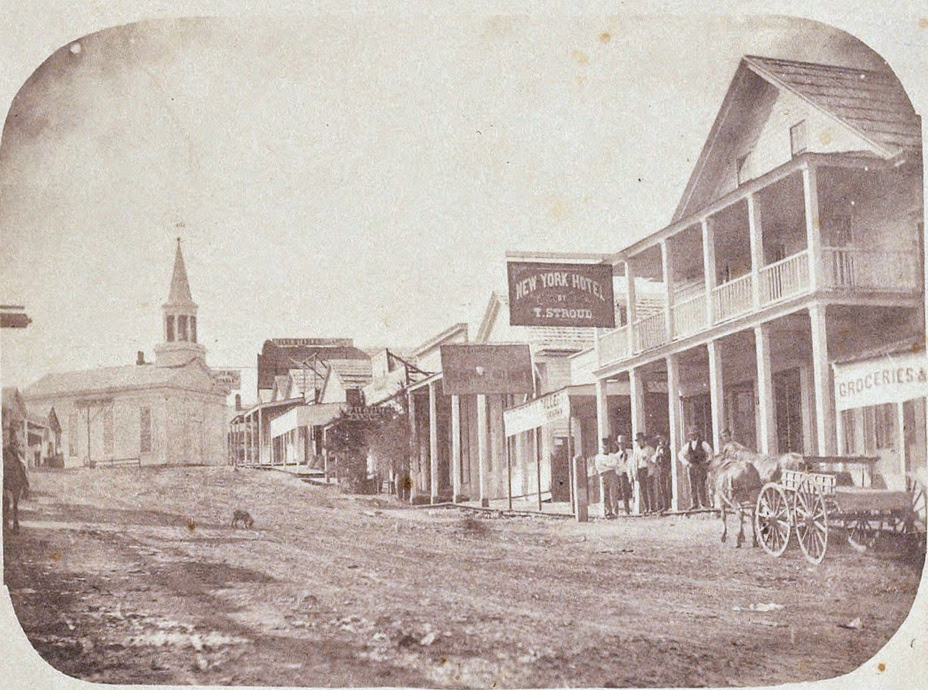
Nevada City c. 1856 by Julia Ann Rudolph

The settlement was originally a Nisenan village named Ustumah.

European Americans first settled Nevada City in 1849, during the California Gold Rush, as Nevada (Spanish for "snow-covered", a reference to the snow-topped mountains in the area). Chinese immigrants as well as free and enslaved Black Americans also settled in the area during the Gold Rush. The town was later called Deer Creek Dry Diggins, and Caldwell's Upper Store. The Gold Tunnel on the north side of Deer Creek was the city's first mine, built in 1850. The first sawmill in Nevada City was built on Deer Creek, just above town, in August 1850, by Lewis & Son, with a water wheel. In 1850–51, Nevada City was the state's most important mining town, and Nevada County the state's leading gold-mining county. In 1851, The Nevada Journal became the first newspaper published in the town and county. The first cemetery in town, the Pioneer Cemetery, was founded around 1851 behind the Nevada City United Methodist Church, Nevada County's first denominational church.

The town of Nevada was incorporated on April 19, 1856. In 1864, the word “City” was added to its name to relieve confusion with the nearby state of Nevada, and the town has legally been known as Nevada City ever since. The former town of Coyoteville later became Nevada City's northwestern section.

== Geography ==
According to the United States Census Bureau, the city has an area of 2.2 square miles (5.7 km^{2}), 99.83% of it land and 0.17% water.

Nevada, Missouri, is named after Nevada City.

Most of Nevada City lies on brown sandy loam soils of the Hoda series which developed on granitic rock.

=== Climate ===
Owing to its exposed location on the western slopes of the Sierra Nevada, Nevada City receives moderate to heavy rainfall for California at 59 inches (1.5 m), though its climate is otherwise fairly typical for the state, classified as Mediterranean (Csa/Csb). Although exceedingly heavy snow falls on the nearby mountains, it rarely falls in the city. During a typical year, there are 31 days with temperatures of 90 °F (32 °C) or higher, 75 freezing nights, and 60 days where the temperature fails to reach 50 °F (10 °C). The record high temperature is 111 °F (44 °C), set on August 14, 1933, and the record low is −1 °F (−18 °C), set on January 21, 1937, and on December 9, 1972.

Climate data for Nevada City, California, 1991–2020 normals, extremes 1893–present
Month	Jan	Feb	Mar	Apr	May	Jun	Jul	Aug	Sep	Oct	Nov	Dec	Year
Record high °F (°C)	83 (28)	86 (30)	92 (33)	94 (34)	101 (38)	104 (40)	106 (41)	111 (44)	107 (42)	99 (37)	90 (32)	86 (30)	111 (44)
Mean maximum °F (°C)	62.0 (16.7)	66.4 (19.1)	72.1 (22.3)	79.1 (26.2)	85.7 (29.8)	93.0 (33.9)	96.0 (35.6)	95.6 (35.3)	92.4 (33.6)	84.9 (29.4)	70.8 (21.6)	59.5 (15.3)	98.2 (36.8)
Mean daily maximum °F (°C)	50.6 (10.3)	52.8 (11.6)	57.0 (13.9)	62.5 (16.9)	70.6 (21.4)	79.4 (26.3)	87.2 (30.7)	86.7 (30.4)	81.8 (27.7)	70.6 (21.4)	57.0 (13.9)	49.8 (9.9)	67.2 (19.5)
Daily mean °F (°C)	42.0 (5.6)	43.5 (6.4)	46.7 (8.2)	50.9 (10.5)	58.8 (14.9)	66.0 (18.9)	73.0 (22.8)	72.4 (22.4)	67.8 (19.9)	58.5 (14.7)	47.4 (8.6)	41.4 (5.2)	55.7 (13.2)
Mean daily minimum °F (°C)	33.4 (0.8)	34.1 (1.2)	36.3 (2.4)	39.3 (4.1)	46.8 (8.2)	52.3 (11.3)	58.8 (14.9)	58.1 (14.5)	53.8 (12.1)	46.2 (7.9)	38.0 (3.3)	33.1 (0.6)	44.2 (6.8)
Mean minimum °F (°C)	26.1 (−3.3)	26.0 (−3.3)	28.2 (−2.1)	30.0 (−1.1)	36.1 (2.3)	43.4 (6.3)	51.7 (10.9)	51.2 (10.7)	44.2 (6.8)	35.8 (2.1)	29.3 (−1.5)	25.2 (−3.8)	22.4 (−5.3)
Record low °F (°C)	−1 (−18)	5 (−15)	12 (−11)	18 (−8)	21 (−6)	28 (−2)	35 (2)	34 (1)	27 (−3)	16 (−9)	13 (−11)	−1 (−18)	−1 (−18)
Average precipitation inches (mm)	10.17 (258)	9.59 (244)	9.28 (236)	4.60 (117)	2.33 (59)	0.84 (21)	0.05 (1.3)	0.16 (4.1)	0.63 (16)	3.17 (81)	7.09 (180)	10.34 (263)	58.25 (1,480.4)
Average snowfall inches (cm)	3.0 (7.6)	5.6 (14)	4.2 (11)	0.9 (2.3)	0.0 (0.0)	0.0 (0.0)	0.0 (0.0)	0.0 (0.0)	0.0 (0.0)	0.0 (0.0)	0.8 (2.0)	3.6 (9.1)	18.1 (46)
Average precipitation days (≥ 0.01 in)	13.6	12.2	12.2	9.1	6.2	2.6	0.3	0.9	2.0	4.4	9.1	12.2	84.8
Average snowy days (≥ 0.01 in)	1.5	2.2	1.8	0.9	0.0	0.0	0.0	0.0	0.0	0.0	0.4	1.2	8.0
Source: NOAA

== Demographics ==
Historical population
Census	Pop.	Note	%±
1880	4,022		—
1890	2,524		−37.2%
1900	3,250		28.8%
1910	2,689		−17.3%
1920	1,782		−33.7%
1930	1,701		−4.5%
1940	2,445		43.7%
1950	2,505		2.5%
1960	2,353		−6.1%
1970	2,314		−1.7%
1980	2,431		5.1%
1990	2,855		17.4%
2000	3,001		5.1%
2010	3,068		2.2%
2020	3,152		2.7%
2024 (est.)	3,195	▲	1.4%
U.S. Decennial Census

=== 2020 census ===
As of the 2020 census, Nevada City had a population of 3,152 and a population density of 1,441.9 inhabitants per square mile (556.7/km^{2}).

The median age was 51.0 years. The age distribution was 13.6% under the age of 18, 5.5% aged 18 to 24, 23.9% aged 25 to 44, 27.6% aged 45 to 64, and 29.4% who were 65 years of age or older. For every 100 females there were 104.1 males, and for every 100 females age 18 and over there were 102.7 males.

Racial composition as of the 2020 census
Race	Number	Percent
White	2,684	85.2%
Black or African American	26	0.8%
American Indian and Alaska Native	55	1.7%
Asian	53	1.7%
Native Hawaiian and Other Pacific Islander	4	0.1%
Some other race	65	2.1%
Two or more races	265	8.4%
Hispanic or Latino (of any race)	268	8.5%

The census reported that 93.4% of the population lived in households, 0.8% lived in non-institutionalized group quarters, and 5.9% were institutionalized. In addition, 93.3% of residents lived in urban areas, while 6.7% lived in rural areas.

There were 1,465 households, out of which 19.5% included children under the age of 18, 34.7% were married-couple households, 8.5% were cohabiting couple households, 33.9% had a female householder with no spouse or partner present, and 22.9% had a male householder with no spouse or partner present. 38.4% of households were one person, and 20.5% were one person aged 65 or older. The average household size was 2.01. There were 734 families (50.1% of all households).

There were 1,623 housing units at an average density of 742.5 units per square mile (286.7 units/km^{2}), of which 1,465 (90.3%) were occupied. Of the occupied units, 58.5% were owner-occupied and 41.5% were occupied by renters. Of all housing units, 9.7% were vacant; the homeowner vacancy rate was 1.0% and the rental vacancy rate was 1.8%.

=== Income and poverty ===
In 2023, the US Census Bureau estimated that the median household income was $69,552, and the per capita income was $42,845. About 5.2% of families and 8.6% of the population were below the poverty line.

=== 2010 census ===
The 2010 United States census reported that Nevada City had a population of 3,068. The population density was 1,399.7 inhabitants per square mile (540.4/km^{2}). The racial makeup of Nevada City was 2,837 (92.5%) White, 26 (0.8%) African American, 28 (0.9%) Native American, 46 (1.5%) Asian, 0 (0%) Pacific Islander, 40 (1.3%) from other races, and 91 (0.4%) from two or more races. Hispanic or Latino of any race were 205 persons (6.7%).

The Census reported that 2,829 people (92.2% of the population) lived in households, 56 (1.8%) lived in non-institutionalized group quarters, and 183 (6.0%) were institutionalized.

There were 1,356 households, out of which 317 (23.4%) had children under the age of 18 living in them, 510 (37.6%) were opposite-sex married couples living together, 155 (11.4%) had a female householder with no husband present, 79 (5.8%) had a male householder with no wife present. There were 97 (7.2%) unmarried opposite-sex partnerships, and 15 (1.1%) same-sex married couples or partnerships. 488 households (36.0%) were made up of individuals, and 168 (12.4%) had someone living alone who was 65 years of age or older. The average household size was 2.09. There were 744 families (54.9% of all households); the average family size was 2.67.

The population was spread out, with 517 people (16.9%) under the age of 18, 199 people (6.5%) aged 18 to 24, 720 people (23.5%) aged 25 to 44, 1,075 people (35.0%) aged 45 to 64, and 557 people (18.2%) who were 65 years of age or older. The median age was 47.5 years. For every 100 females, there were 100.4 males. For every 100 females age 18 and over, there were 101.8 males.

There were 1,510 housing units at an average density of 688.9 units per square mile (266.0 units/km^{2}), of which 786 (58.0%) were owner-occupied, and 570 (42.0%) were occupied by renters. The homeowner vacancy rate was 3.8%; the rental vacancy rate was 4.8%. 1,678 people (54.7% of the population) lived in owner-occupied housing units and 1,151 people (37.5%) lived in rental housing units.

== Economy ==
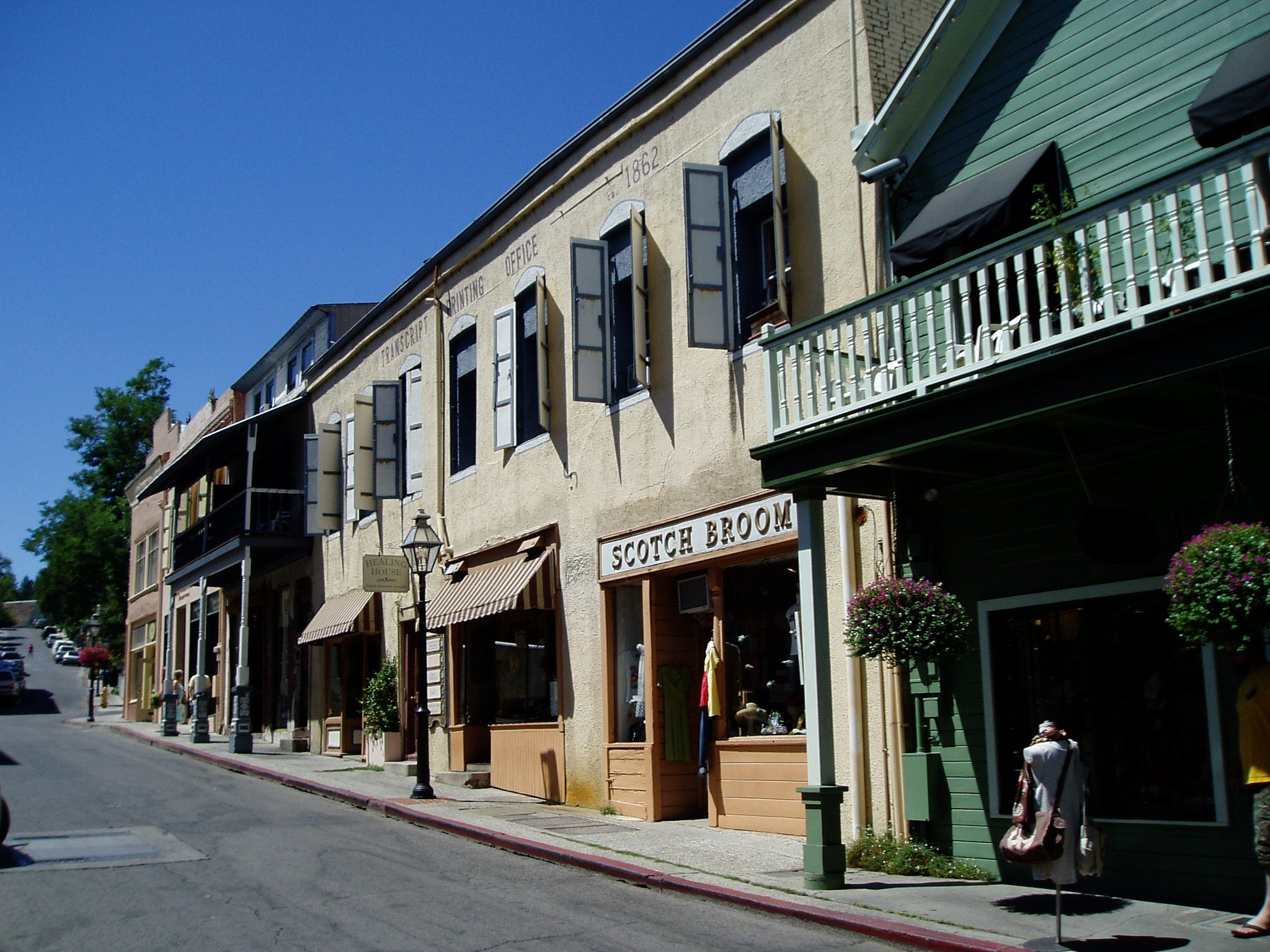
Commercial Street

=== Tourism ===
Nevada City's tourist attractions include:

- Nevada City Winery was the first bonded winery to open in Nevada County after Prohibition.

== Arts and culture ==
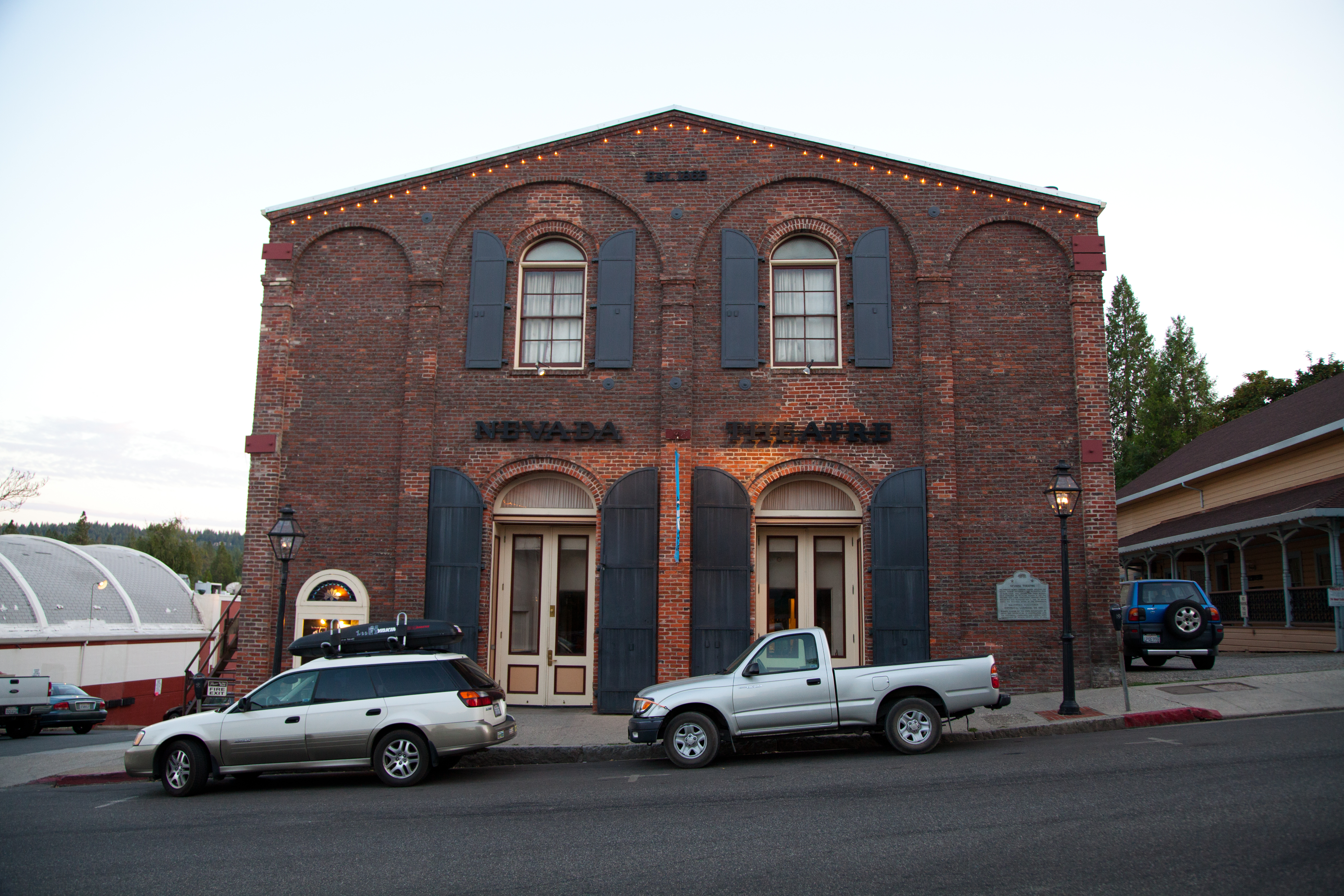
Nevada Theatre

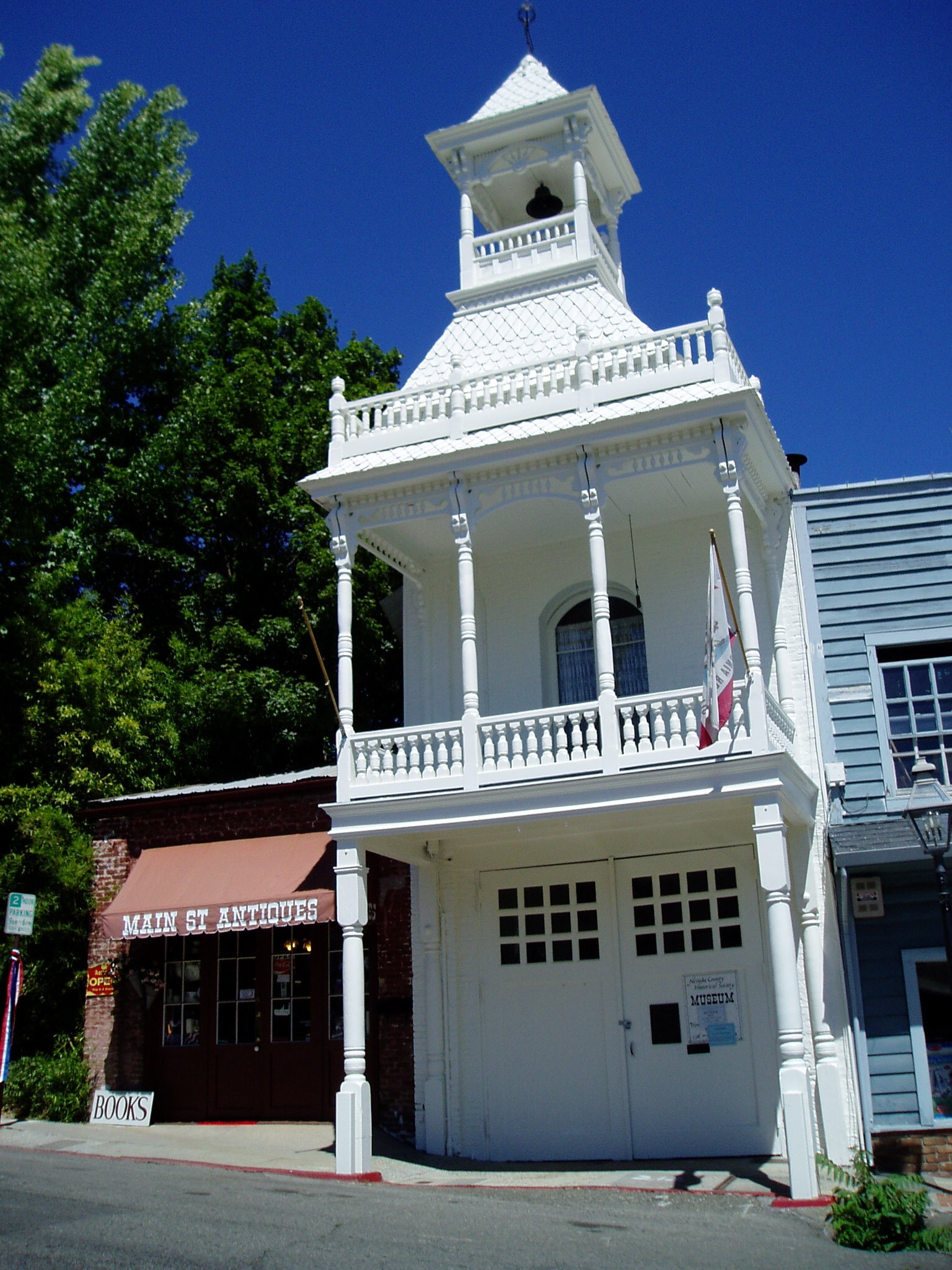
Fire House #1 Museum

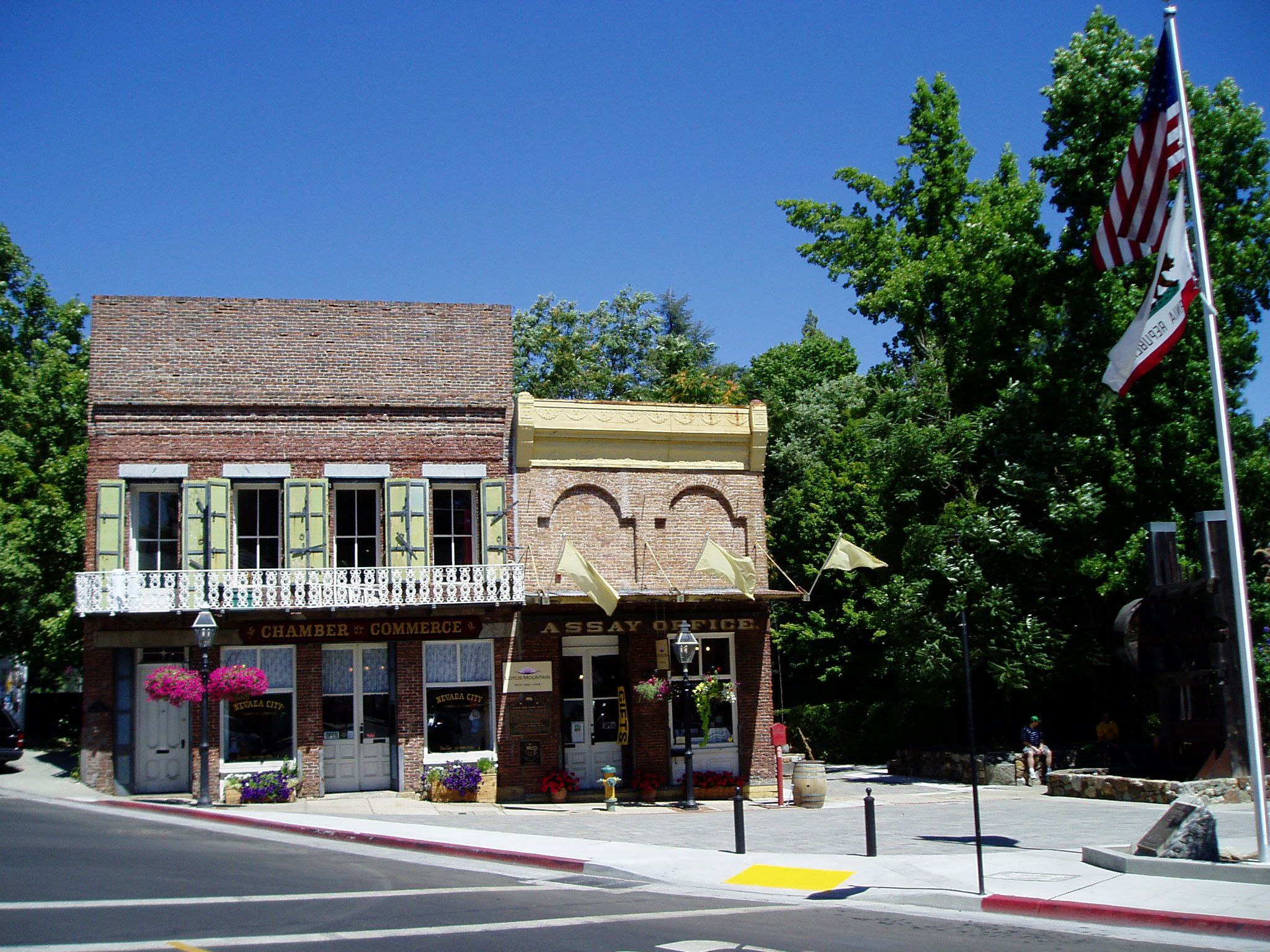
Chamber of Commerce, formerly South Yuba Canal Office

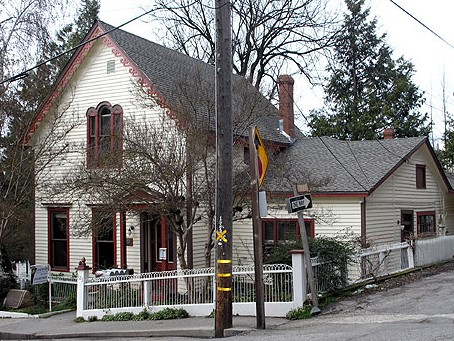
Charles Marsh house

Live music, theater and dance are performed at Miners Foundry Cultural Center, and the Nevada Theatre.

=== Museums ===
- Firehouse No. 1 Museum
- Nevada County Narrow Gauge Railroad & Transportation Museum
- The Miners Foundry Cultural Center has a small museum

=== Recurring events ===
Recurring and annual events include:

- Mardi Gras, and Psychic Faire.
- Constitution Day Parade, founded in 1967; one of the oldest and largest Constitution Day observances in the western United States.
- Wild and Scenic Film Festival, founded in 2003, showcasing films about environmental issues, outdoor adventure, and extreme sports.
- Nevada City Film Festival, founded in 2001.
- Nevada City Storytelling Festival, founded in 1985.
- Summer Nights, an outdoor street festival of art and music.
- Victorian Christmas street fair.
- Nevada City Classic, founded in 1960, a professional cycling race.

=== Buildings and structures ===
The Nevada City Downtown Historic District included several sites on the National Register of Historic Places or which have California Historical Landmark status.

== Government ==
Nevada City elects a five-member city council. Council members select the mayor and vice mayor from their ranks. Council members appoint residents to a five-member Planning Commission.

Nevada City launched a "Goat Fund Me" campaign to raise $25,000 to have goats graze through dense brush in the municipal greenbelt. Nevada City is considered particularly at risk of wildfire, a "very high fire hazard severity zone" because of its wooded steep hillsides, narrow streets, 19th-century Gold Rush-era homes, and thick tree canopy.

=== County, state, and federal representation ===
Nevada City is in Nevada County. The District 1 Supervisor is Heidi Hall.

In the state legislature, Nevada City is in the 1st senatorial district, represented by Republican Megan Dahle, and the 1st Assembly district, represented by Republican Heather Hadwick.

Nevada City is in California's 3rd congressional district, represented by Independent Kevin Kiley.

According to the California Secretary of State, as of February 10, 2019, Nevada City has 2,353 registered voters. Of those, 1,225 (52.1%) are registered Democrats, 384 (16.3%) are registered Republicans, and 297 (12.6%) have declined to state a political party.

== Education ==
Nevada City is within an elementary school district, Nevada City Elementary School District, that operates three schools: Deer Creek (K–4), Seven Hills (5–8) and Nevada City Charter School (K–8). Other large schools in the area include Nevada City School of the Arts, Forest Charter School in Nevada City, ad Yuba River Charter School in Grass Valley.

The high school district that Nevada City is inside is Nevada Joint Union High School District. After 8th grade, most students attend Nevada Union High School in nearby Grass Valley as part of the Nevada Joint Union HSD. Other high schools in the area include Silver Springs High School, Ghidotti High School, Sierra Academy of Expeditionary Learning, Forest Charter, Bitney Prep High School, and Bear River.

=== Higher education ===
Other local schools include the California College of Ayurveda and Connected Communities Academy.

== Notable people ==
- Lexie Alford (born 1998), youngest person to travel to every country
- Tina Basich (born 1969), professional snowboarder
- Donald J. Butz, U.S. Air Force (born 1933), Major General
- Jennie Carter (1830–1881) African-American journalist and essayist
- Anthony Chabot (1813–1888), 19th-century businessman and entrepreneur; co-inventor of hydraulic mining in Nevada City
- Peter Collier (1939–2019), political author, editor of RAMPARTS magazine
- Joseph Cornell (born 1950), naturalist and author
- Alela Diane (born 1983), singer/songwriter
- Matt DiBenedetto (born 1991), NASCAR driver
- Heather Donahue, actress, American writer
- Eleanor Dumont (1829–1879), professional gambler
- Dan Elkan (born 1978), singer-songwriter and producer
- Alasdair Fraser (born 1955), Scottish fiddler and owner of Culburnie Records
- Noah Georgeson (born 1975), musician, producer
- Felix Gillet (1835–1908), pioneer California horticulturist
- Oakley Hall (1920–2008), novelist
- Robert M. Hunt (1828–1902), physician
- Roger Hodgson (born 1950), singer/songwriter and ex-Supertramp member
- Swami Kriyananda (1926–2013), spiritual teacher and founder of Ananda Village
- Cliff Kushler, inventor
- Charles Marsh, possibly Nevada City's first resident and namer of the town
- Tully Marshall (1864–1943), actor
- Jim McClarin (born 1945/1946), politician
- John McEntire (born 1970), drummer, recording engineer, and music producer
- Thomas Bard McFarland (1828–1908), associate justice of the Supreme Court of California
- Stephen McNallen (born 1948), Germanic Neopagan leader and writer
- Joanna Newsom (born 1982), harpist, singer/songwriter, and actress
- Tim O'Connor (1927–2018), actor
- John Olmsted (1938–2011), naturalist, co-creator of The Independence Trail State Park
- Utah Phillips (1935–2008), folk singer, activist
- Ed Reimers (1912–2009), actor and television announcer
- Terry Riley (born 1935), composer
- Gyan Riley (born 1977), guitarist and composer
- Alexander Rossi (born 1991), professional race car driver, winner of the 100th Indianapolis 500 in 2016
- Julia Ann Rudolph (c. 1820 – c. 1900), photographer who had a studio in the city from 1856 to around 1860
- Aaron A. Sargent (1827–1887), U.S. Senator
- Lorenzo Sawyer (1820–1891), Chief Justice of the California Supreme Court
- Niles Searls (1825–1907), Chief Justice of the Supreme Court of California
- Claus Sievert (1949–2009), printmaker, illustrator
- Mariee Sioux (born 1985), singer/songwriter
- Gary Snyder (born 1930), poet
- Rosie Stephenson-Goodknight (born 1953), editor
- Evan Strong (born 1986), professional snowboarder
- Heinrich Sylvester Theodor Tiling (1818–1871), physician and botanist

== In popular culture ==
Nevada City was the setting for the 2006 Hallmark Channel original movie, The Christmas Card.

== Twin cities ==
Nevada City is twinned with Penzance, a seaside town in Cornwall, UK, and the nearby tin and copper mining town of St Just in Penwith, Cornwall, UK. The twinning is a result of Cornish migration during the Californian gold rush in which Cornish mining expertise migrated to the area. City Hall has a room dedicated to the twinning and houses Cornish memorabilia and items donated on various exchanges. Penzance Youth Wind Band has joined forces with Nevada Union High School's instrumental music department on two occasions.

== See also ==
- Scotts Flat Lake
- Yuba River
- The Willo Steakhouse
