= Deer Creek (Nevada County, California) =

Coordinates: 39°15′15.59″N 121°04′13.94″W

Deer Creek is a stream that flows through the Sierra Nevada Range in Northern California, USA. The 34 miles (55 km) stream begins above Scotts Flat Lake in the alpine region in the Tahoe National Forest, continues through the middle of downtown Nevada City, is a tributary to Lake Wildwood and ends as it enters the Yuba River below Englebright Lake.

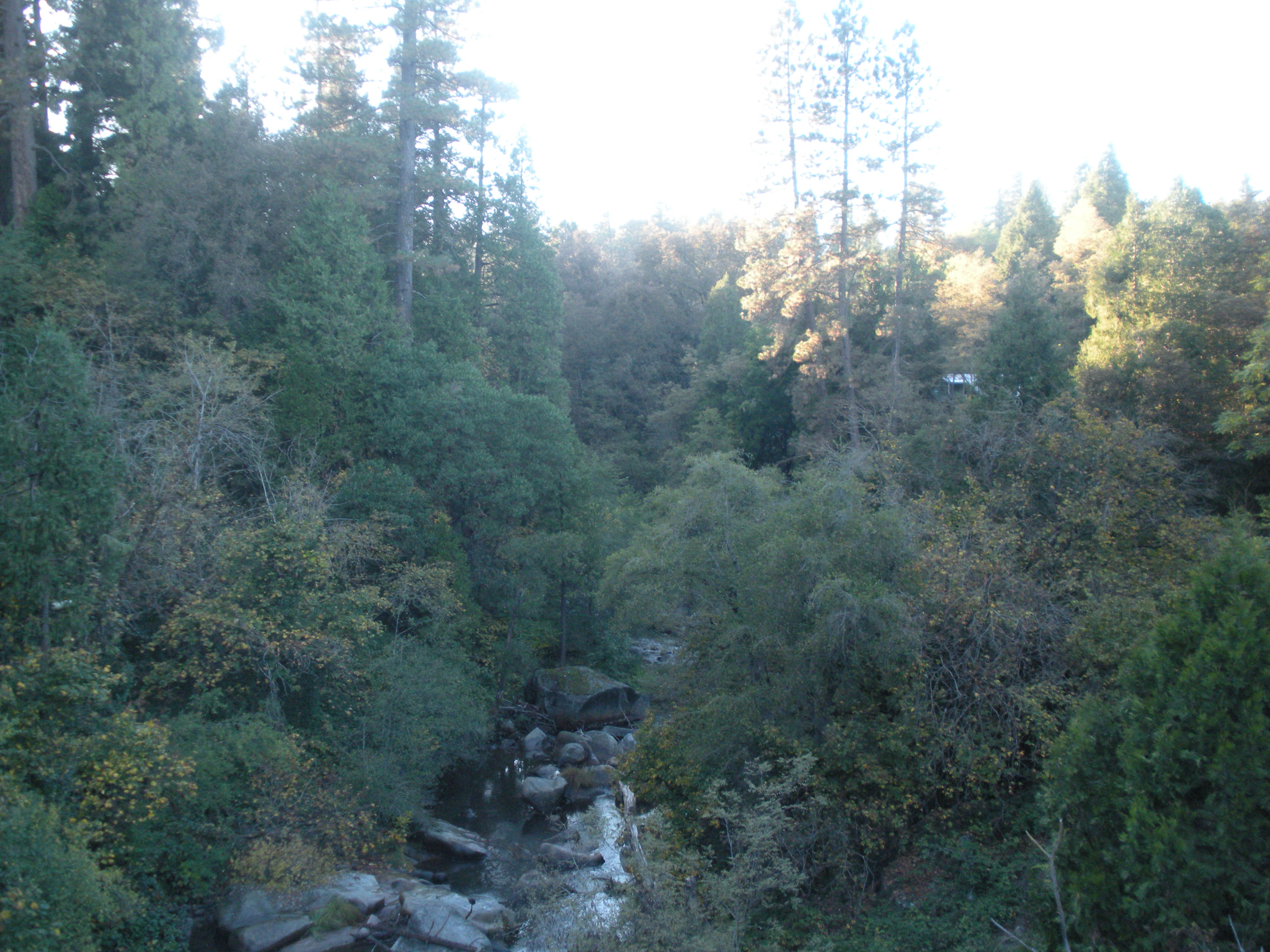
Deer Creek in 2011

The California Office of Environmental Health Hazard Assessment has issued a safe advisory for any fish caught in Deer Creek due to elevated levels of mercury.

== Trail ==
The Deer Creek Tribute Trail is a series of walking trails constructed around the creek upstream from downtown Nevada City.

== See also ==
- Grass Valley, California
