= Yuba River =

Waterway in Northern California

Yuba River Henneet, Rio De Los Yubas
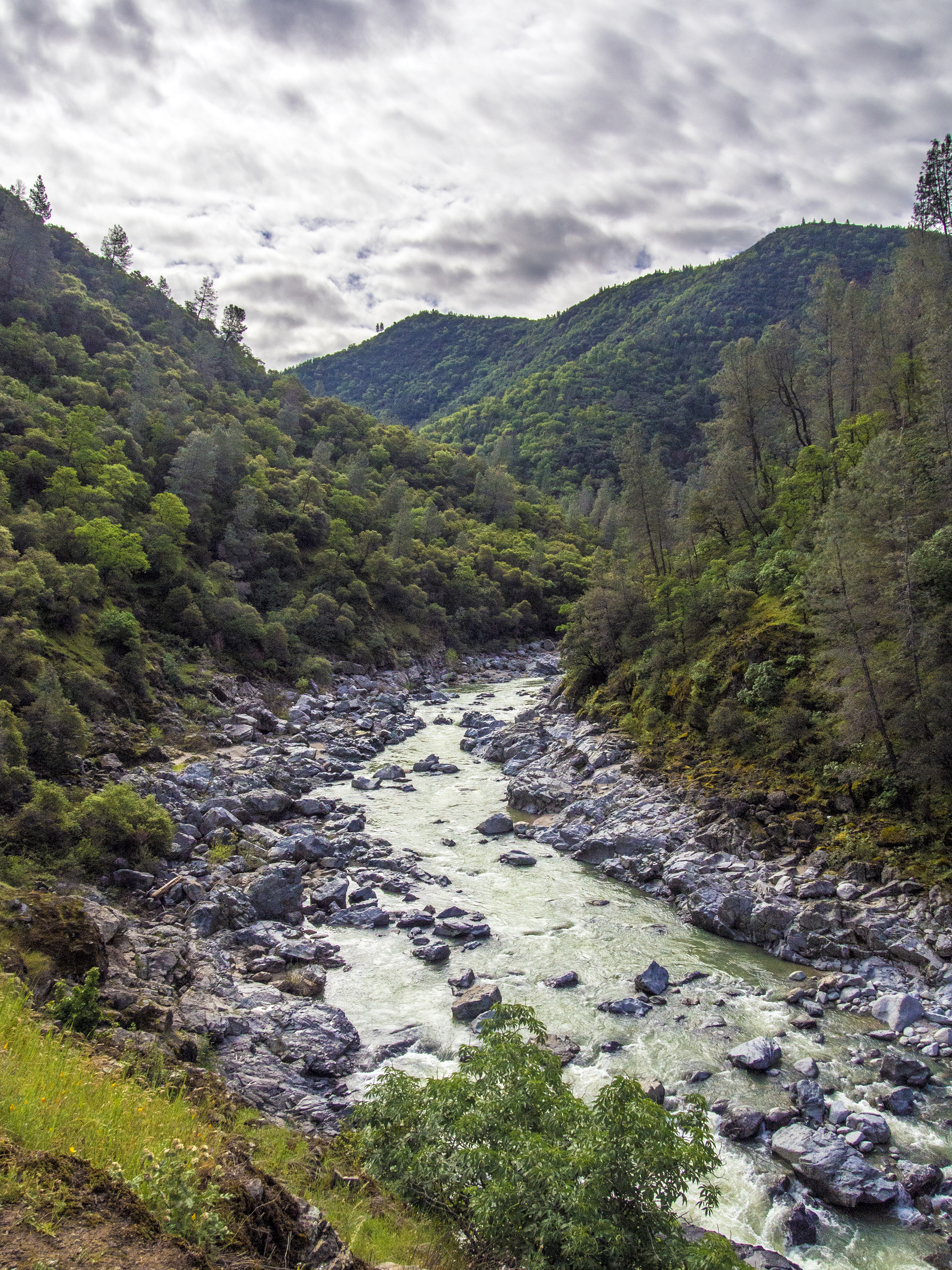
- At South Yuba River State Park

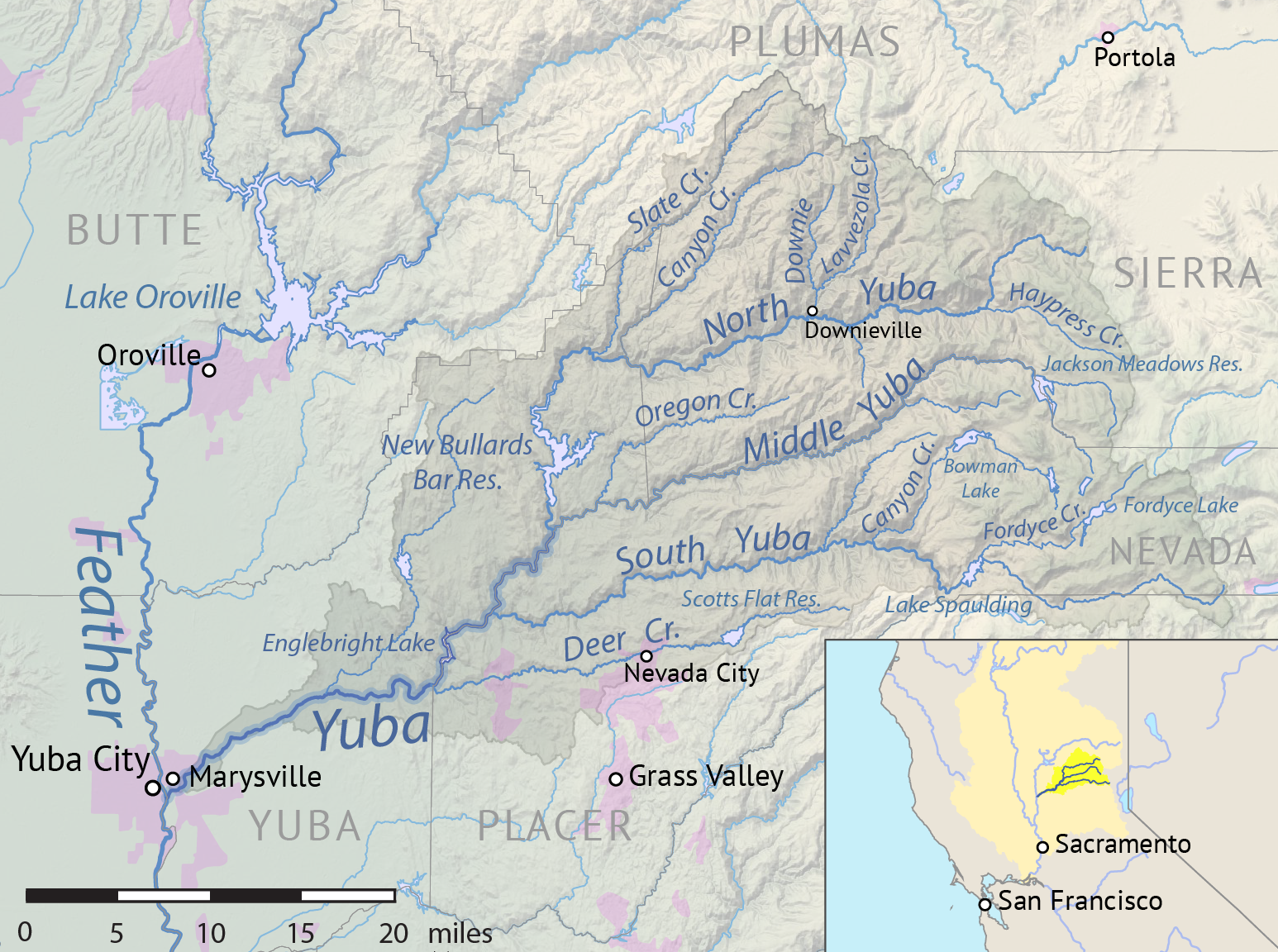
- Map of the Yuba River basin
- Etymology: From the Nisenan name for waterway

Location
- Country: United States
- State: California
- Region: Nevada County
- Cities: North San Juan, Marysville, Yuba City

Physical characteristics
- Source: Confluence of North and Middle Yuba River
  - location: Near North San Juan, Yuba/Nevada county line
  - coordinates: 39°22′07″N 121°08′11″W
  - elevation: 1,129 ft (344 m)
- Mouth: Feather River
  - location: Yuba City-Marysville, Yuba County
  - coordinates: 39°07′39″N 121°35′48″W
  - elevation: 49 ft (15 m)
- Length: 39.7 mi (63.9 km)
- Basin size: 1,345 sq mi (3,480 km^{2})
- Discharge
  - location: near Marysville, about 4.2 mi (6.8 km) from the mouth
  - average: 2,334 cu ft/s (66.1 m^{3}/s)
  - minimum: 15 cu ft/s (0.42 m^{3}/s)
  - maximum: 180,000 cu ft/s (5,100 m^{3}/s)

Basin features
- River system: Feather River basin
- Tributaries
  - left: Middle Yuba River, South Yuba River, Deer Creek (Nevada County, California)
  - right: North Yuba River

The Yuba River is a tributary of the Feather River in the Sierra Nevada and eastern Sacramento Valley, in the U.S. state of California. The main stem of the river is about 40 miles (64 km) long, and its headwaters are split into three major forks. The Yuba River proper is formed at the North Yuba and Middle Yuba rivers' confluence, with the South Yuba joining a short distance downstream. Measured to the head of the North Yuba River, the Yuba River is just over 100 miles (160 km) long.

The river drains 1,345 square miles (3,480 km^{2}), mostly in the western slope and foothills of the Sierra Nevada. The average runoff of the Yuba River basin is approximately 2,303,000 acre-feet (2.841 km^{3}) per year, providing about one-third of the flow of the Feather River, and 10 percent of the flow of the Sacramento River, which the Feather ultimately drains into. Since the early 20th century, irrigation and hydropower diversion projects have gradually reduced the river's flow.

The river's name comes from the local tribe, the Nisenan, word for "waterway," 'uba seo.' It is spelled in early records as "Yubu" and applied to the river by 1844. Some claim the name is a variant of Spanish uba or uva, referring to grapes found growing along the banks of the river.

== Course ==
=== North Yuba River ===
The North Yuba River, 61.1 miles (98.3 km) long, rises at Yuba Pass along California State Route 49, near the eastern boundary of the Tahoe National Forest. It flows southwest then west through a 3,000-foot-deep (910 m) canyon past the communities of Downieville (where it receives the Downie River from the north) and Goodyears Bar. Its main tributaries, Canyon Creek and Slate Creek, join from the north shortly downstream of there. The river turns south near Clipper Mills and flows into the 4,800-acre (1,900 ha) New Bullards Bar Reservoir, impounded by 645-foot (197 m)-high New Bullards Bar Dam. About 5 miles (8.0 km) below New Bullards Bar Dam, it joins with the Middle Yuba River to form the Yuba River.

=== Middle Yuba River ===
Originating in a bowl-shaped valley in Moscove Meadow, the 55.4-mile-long (89.2 km) Middle Yuba River flows north into Jackson Meadows Reservoir, then turns west, soon entering a steep gorge. The majority of the river demarcates the boundary of Sierra County in the north and Nevada County in the south. It receives Kanaka Creek from the north and is then interrupted by the Our House Diversion Dam, which diverts water from the Middle Fork to the North Fork at New Bullards Bar Reservoir. Below the dam, it continues flowing west, receives Oregon Creek from the north and intersects California State Route 49 about 2 miles (3.2 km) northwest of North San Juan. About 7 miles (11 km) downstream it joins with the North Yuba River.

=== South Yuba River ===
The 65.3-mile-long (105.1 km) South Yuba River originates at Lake Angela in Nevada County about three quarters of a mile north of Donner Pass, about three miles east of the town of Soda Springs. After passing through Lake Van Norden with Upper Castle Creek (longer than the Lake Angela stem) entering from the right, it gathers numerous snow-fed tributaries running west through a marshy, lake-filled valley, crossing Interstate 80 several times. The river briefly enters Placer County before flowing back north into Nevada County, then flows into Lake Spaulding, where much of its water is diverted south to the Bear River drainage. The remainder of the river turns northward into a gorge near Emigrant Gap before continuing west. It receives Canyon Creek from the right, then receives Poorman Creek also from the right near Washington. The river continues west into the foothills and into South Yuba River State Park where it is bridged by State Route 49. It joins the Yuba River at the upper end of Englebright Lake.

=== Main stem ===
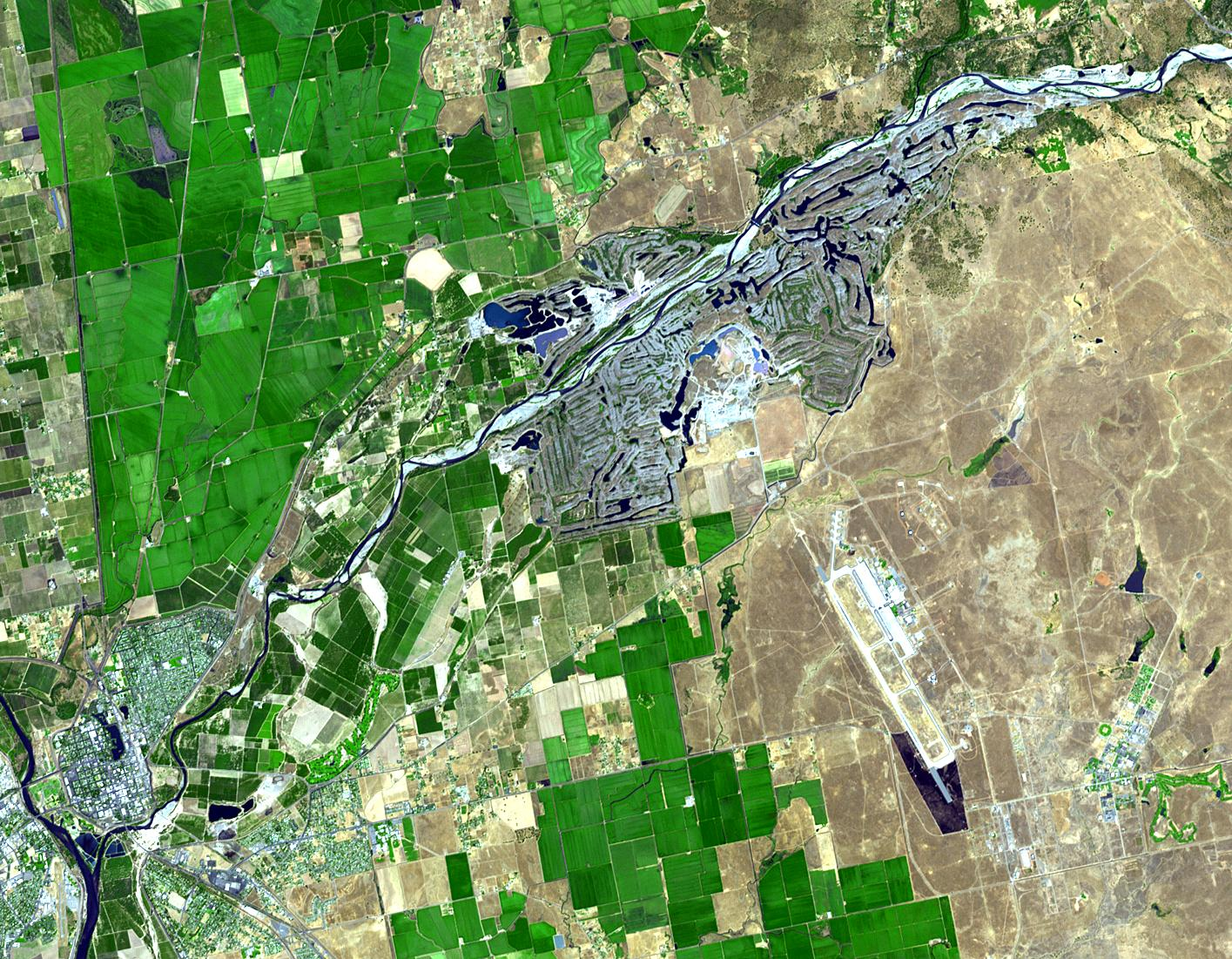
Satellite view of the lower Yuba River - Yuba City/Marysville and the Feather River lie near the bottom left; Yuba Goldfields are in the upper right center

From the joining of the North Yuba River and Middle Yuba River, the Yuba River mainstem flows southwards, then southwest, through the Sierra Nevada foothills, forming the Yuba-Nevada County border. The river widens into upper Englebright Lake near French Bar, and is joined by the South Yuba within the reservoir. It passes through the Englebright Dam near Lake Wildwood and is then joined by Deer Creek (which flows out of Lake Wildwood) on the left. The Yuba River bed widens considerably as it flows out into the Sacramento Valley near the Yuba Goldfields, a section of the Yuba River valley consisting of dredged sediments washed down by hydraulic mining in the 19th century. The river then turns southwest, flowing through irrigated farmland. It then skirts the south side of Marysville and empties into the Feather River between the cities of Marysville, Yuba City and Linda.

== History ==
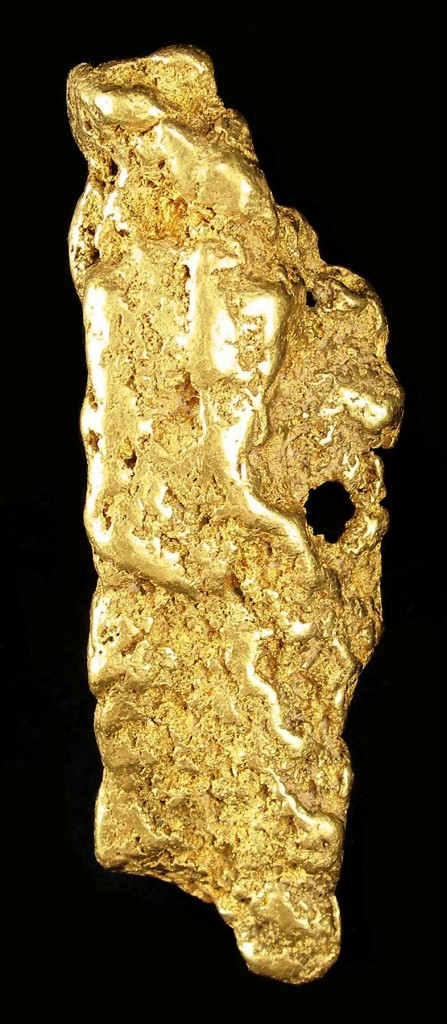
Large gold nugget from the Yuba River placers, weight 182 g.

The Yuba River valley was originally one of the most densely populated Native American areas in California. Historians divide indigenous peoples living in the Yuba River area into several groups – the Konkow, Maidu, Nisenan and Miwok. These groups did not function as large tribes; rather, they were divided into hundreds of small villages, with distinct governments but similar customs. Like other indigenous people of the Sierra Nevada foothill region, their staple food was acorns, but they also hunted and gathered for other foods including abundant salmon runs in the Yuba River.

In the 1850s, the California Gold Rush brought large numbers of European-American settlers into the area, followed by many Mexican, African and Chinese immigrants. These European-American settlers brought diseases with them, to which the Native Americans and Californios had no immunity. Within a few years, these diseases wiped out most of the native population.

The Yuba river is also the site of the lynching of Josefa Segovia. In 1851 she was hung on the Jersey bridge on Yuba River for self defense against an Anglo-American man.

William Gambel (1823–1849), naturalist, ornithologist and botanist, died of typhoid at a miners' camp along the river.

The Yuba River and its forks were one of the richest parts of the Mother Lode, and miners poured to the region in great numbers. Although gold was first extracted by simple methods such as panning and sluicing, large-scale industrial hydraulic mining left a much greater impact. About 25 million cubic yards (19,400,000 m^{3}) of hydraulic mining debris was carried down the Yuba River. This raised stream beds up to 50 ft (15 m) in places, buried riverside land under sediment, and increased the risk of flooding. The practice was banned in 1884 following lawsuits from farmers who had been affected by the debris flows.

Much of the debris left by the destruction of hydraulic mining remains today as the Yuba Goldfields. In addition, the extensive use of mercury in processing gold led to contamination of a relatively large area. The contamination was still detectable in 2013 and will be so for an estimated time of more than 10,000 years.

In 1877, the world's first long-distance telephone line was strung along the South Yuba River from French Corral to French Lake (now called Bowman Lake), a distance of 58 miles (93 km).

== Dams and diversions ==
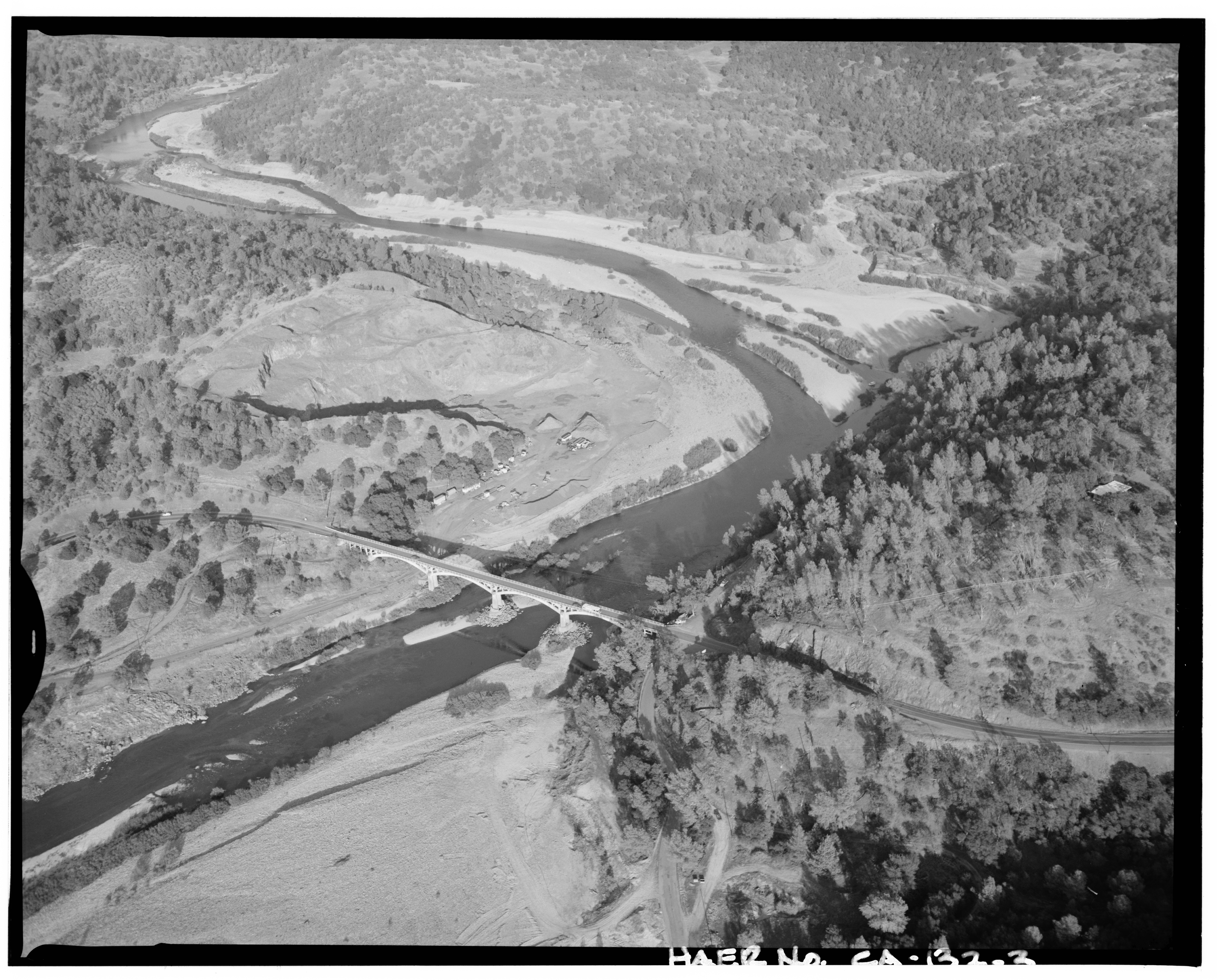
Yuba River at Parks Bar, 1991

Like the majority of California rivers, the Yuba was dammed at many points during the 20th century, and large amounts of water are withdrawn for irrigation and municipal water supply. Daguerre Point Dam was built in 1906 by the U.S. Army Corps of Engineers in order to trap hydraulic mining debris. After concerns about its impact on fish populations, the dam was fitted with fish ladders in 1937. In 1922-24 PG&E built the original Bullards Bar Dam to produce hydroelectricity and trap debris. The concrete arch Englebright Dam was built in 1941 to trap mining debris following the re-legalization of hydraulic mining during the 1930s. However, mining never resumed on a Gold Rush scale in the Yuba River watershed. Today, Englebright serves mainly to produce hydroelectricity.

New Bullards Bar Dam was built on the North Yuba River in response to the huge flood of December 1955, which destroyed much of Yuba City. Completed in 1969, the 645 ft (197 m) high concrete arch dam is one of the tallest dams in the United States, replacing and submerging the old Bullards Bar Dam. It stores almost 1 million acre-feet (1.2 km^{3}) to provide flood control, irrigation and hydroelectricity.

The Yuba River Development Project includes New Bullards Bar Dam and a number of supporting facilities, including a diversion dam (Our House Dam) and tunnel which divert the Middle Yuba River into New Bullards Bar Reservoir, to increase hydropower generation. The 340 megawatt New Colgate Powerhouse is located about 4 miles (6.4 km) below New Bullards Bar Dam, and it generates over 1.3 billion kilowatt hours of energy per year. These diversions have resulted in the seasonal dewatering of the lower North Yuba River and Middle Yuba River and about four miles of the main Yuba River.

The Middle Yuba River and South Yuba River are linked by the Yuba-Bear and Drum-Spaulding hydroelectric projects, which are owned by the Nevada Irrigation District and PG&E, respectively. These two interconnected projects generate a combined 1.2 billion kilowatt hours per year and with over 40 dams and reservoirs and 16 powerhouses, are considered the most complex hydroelectric scheme in the United States. Major dams include Jackson Meadows Dam and Bowman Dam (part of Yuba-Bear) and Lake Spaulding Dam and Fordyce Lake Dam (part of Drum-Spaulding). These projects divert a portion of the Yuba River's flow to the Bear River, a tributary of the Feather River further south.

Other dams include Scotts Flat and Wildwood on Deer Creek; and Mildred and Virginia Ranch on Dry Creek, a lower tributary of the Yuba.

== Environmental issues ==
The California Office of Environmental Health Hazard Assessment has issued a safe eating advisory for any fish caught in Yuba River, North Yuba River, and Middle Yuba River due to elevated levels of mercury.

The Spring and Shady tributaries of the South Yuba contain dozens of historic mine locations, the largest of which is the San Juan Ridge Mine. Mining operations in the area began in 1850 and have been more or less driven by the price of gold since that time. In 1995, the San Juan Ridge Mine Corporation stopped gold mining operations following the breach of an underground aquifer that caused flooding and the overflow of containment ponds. This breach released millions of gallons of mine waste into Spring and Shady creeks, drained and contaminated 12 local wells through the oxidation of naturally occurring heavy metals- including a well that supplied drinking water to a local K-8 school. The mining company proposed to re-open their mine for gold extraction in 2012, which would require pumping up to 3.5 million gallons of groundwater to operate each day. Pumping groundwater at this scale would likely deplete the underground aquifer that provides water to hundreds of community members. This could potentially cause serious impacts to surface water quality in Spring and Shady creeks due to increased surface flows from mining practices.

=== 2026 New Colgate Powerhouse failure ===
On February 13, 2026, a 14-foot-diameter steel penstock ruptured at the New Colgate Powerhouse near Dobbins, releasing roughly 400 acre-feet of water into the river canyon. One contract worker was injured and airlifted by CAL FIRE, and approximately 15,000 customers in Yuba, Nevada, Sierra, and Butte counties lost electricity when the powerhouse went offline. The shutdown cut releases from Englebright Dam almost in half.

Flows on the lower Yuba dropped from 1,400 cubic feet per second to 560 cfs within an hour. Juvenile spring-run and fall-run Chinook salmon were stranded in shallow margins as the water receded. Researchers estimated thousands of fish killed.

Federal regulators ordered the Yuba Water Agency to hire independent forensic engineers to determine the root cause. Keiko Mertz of Friends of the River called it "an infrastructure problem, not an isolated accident." It is estimated the New Colgate system could take a year or more to return to full operation.

== Tributaries ==
In hierarchical order, going upstream:

- Dry Creek
  - Keystone Creek
  - New York Creek
- Spring Creek
- Rock Creek
- Deer Creek
  - Squirrel Creek
  - North Fork Deer Creek
  - South Fork Deer Creek
- South Yuba River
  - Shady Creek
  - Humbug Creek
  - Poorman Creek
    - South Fork Poorman Creek
  - Fordyce Creek
    - North Creek
  - Rattlesnake Creek
  - Lower Castle Creek
  - Upper Castle Creek
- Dobbins Creek
- Middle Yuba River
  - Clear Creek
  - Oregon Creek
    - Grizzly Creek
    - Brush Creek
  - Grizzly Creek
  - Indian Creek
  - Kanaka Creek
  - Wolf Creek
  - East Fork Creek
  - Pass Creek
  - French Creek
- North Yuba River
  - Willow Creek
  - Bridger Creek
    - Brandy Creek
  - Mill Creek
  - Slate Creek
  - Canyon Creek
    - Little Canyon Creek
    - East Fork Canyon Creek
    - South Fork Canyon Creek
  - Cherokee Creek
  - Fiddle Creek
  - Goodyears Creek
  - Downie River
    - Pauley Creek
    - Lavezzola Creek
      - Empire Creek
      - Sunnyside Creek
      - Spencer Creek
    - West Branch Downie River
  - Haypress Creek
  - Salmon Creek
  - Deer Creek
  - Lincoln Creek
  - Dorsey Creek

== See also ==
- List of rivers of California
