= Jackson Meadows Dam =

Dam in Nevada County, California

- Interactive map of Jackson Meadows Dam
- Country: United States
- Location: Nevada County, California
- Coordinates: 39°30′32″N 120°33′21″W
- Status: Operational
- Opening date: 1965; 61 years ago

Jackson Meadows Dam (National ID # CA00254) is a dam in Nevada County, California.

The earthen dam was constructed in 1965 for flood control and irrigation water storage, with a height of 195 feet and a length of 1530 feet at its crest. It impounds the Middle Fork of the Yuba River as one of the ten facilities of the Nevada Irrigation District. The dam is part of the Yuba-Bear Hydroelectric Project.

The reservoir it creates, Jackson Meadows Reservoir, has a surface area of 1.5 square miles and normal capacity of 52,500 acre-feet. The site is surrounded by Tahoe National Forest.

== See also ==
- List of lakes in California
- List of dams and reservoirs in California
