= Scotts Flat Reservoir =

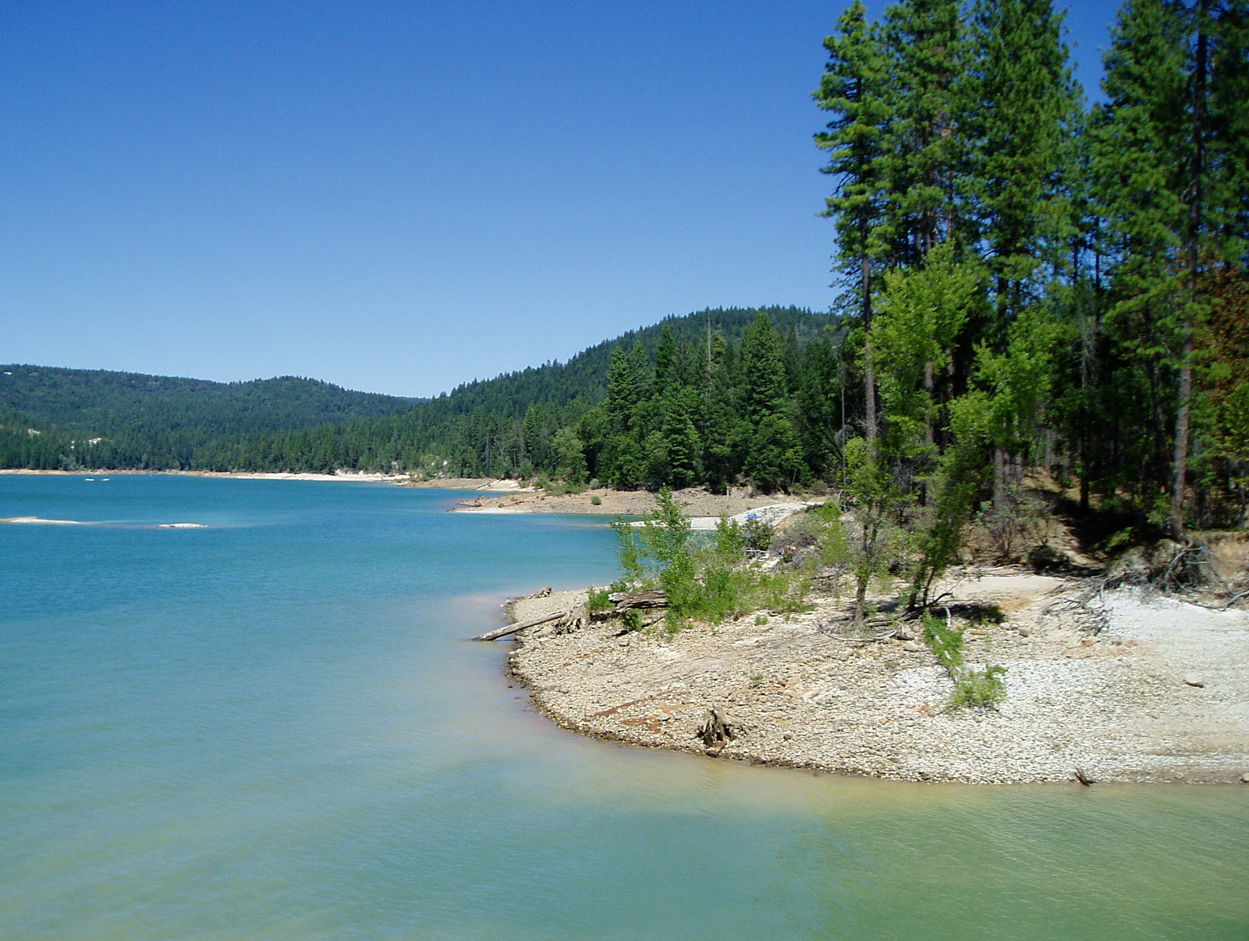

- Location within California Location within the United States
- Location: Tahoe National Forest; Nevada County, California
- Coordinates: 39°16′22″N 120°55′50″W
- Type: Reservoir
- Primary inflows: Deer Creek
- Primary outflows: Deer Creek
- Basin countries: United States
- Surface area: 850 acres (340 ha)
- Shore length^{1}: 7.5 mi (12.1 km)
- Surface elevation: 936 m (3,071 ft)
- Settlements: Scotts Flat Lake
- References: U.S. Geological Survey Geographic Names Information System: Scotts Flat Reservoir
- ^{1} Shore length is not a well-defined measure.

Scotts Flat Reservoir is an artificial lake in the Tahoe National Forest of Nevada County, California, 6.5 miles (10.5 km) east of Nevada City. The lake is at an elevation of 3,100 ft (940 m) and has a surface area of 850 acres (340 ha), with 7.5 miles (12.1 km) of shoreline lined with pine trees. Amenities consist of two launch ramps, a marina, campsites, a picnic area, sandy beaches, and a general store.

The earthen rock-fill Scotts Flat Dam dates from 1948 and impounds Deer Creek to create the reservoir with a capacity of 49,000 acre-feet. At 175 feet above streambed, the dam is owned and operated by the county-level Nevada Irrigation District.

== See also ==
- List of lakes in California
