= Emigrant Gap =

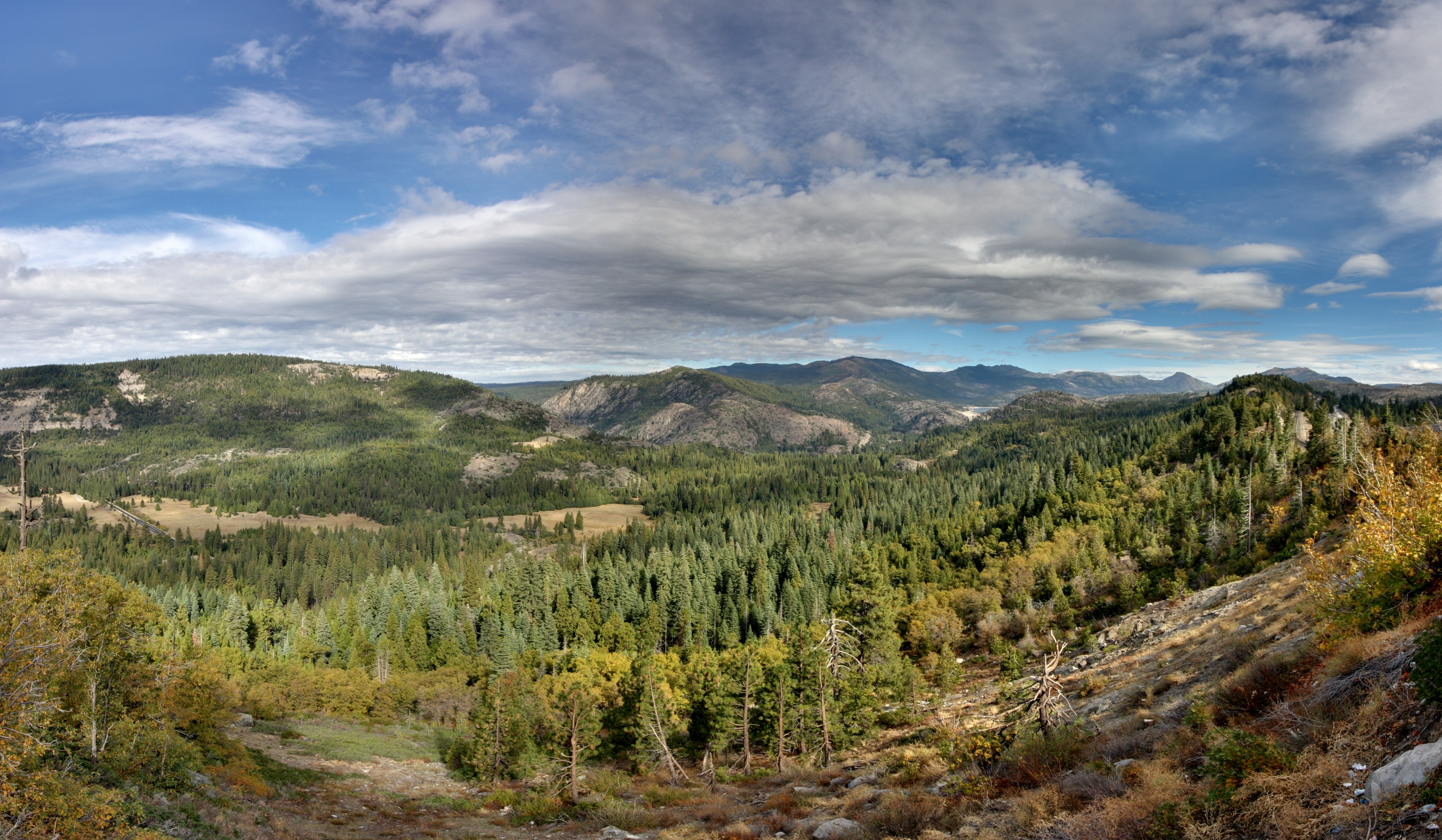
- Interactive map of Emigrant Gap
- Elevation: ~5,200 ft. / 1,585 m
- Traversed by: I-80, Union Pacific Railroad

Location
- Location: Placer County, California, United States
- Range: Sierra Nevada
- Coordinates: 39.303°N 120.666°W

California Historical Landmark
- Reference no.: 403

Emigrant Gap is a natural gap in a ridge on the California Trail as it crosses the Sierra Nevada, to the west of Donner Pass in Placer County, California. It was part of the Truckee Route, a portion of the California Trail by which pioneers emigrated west from the United States to California in the mid-19th century. Emigrant Gap marks the location at which the pioneer wagon trains crossed from the American River drainage to the Bear River drainage. Wagons had to be lowered on ropes in order to descend the area's steep cliffs. The Stephens–Townsend–Murphy Party became the first to cross Emigrant Gap and the Sierra Nevada in 1844–1845.

The small unincorporated community of Emigrant Gap is adjacent to the present-day site. On June 25, 1950, a California state historical marker (number 403) was dedicated at the site, which is now located along the route of Interstate 80:

"The spring of 1845 saw the first covered wagons surmount the Sierra Nevada Mountains. They left this valley, ascended to the ridge, and turned westward to old Emigrant Gap. The wagons were lowered by ropes to the floor of Bear Valley. Hundreds followed before, during, and after the gold rush. This was a hazardous portion of the overland emigrant trail."

California historical marker #403 at Emigrant Gap

== Climate ==
Nearby Blue Canyon–Nyack Airport has a warm-summer Mediterranean climate (Csb) according to the Köppen climate classification system. Summers are generally warm with cool nights, while winters are cold and extremely snowy.

Climate data for Emigrant Gap, California (Lake Spaulding), 1981-2010 temperature and precipitation normals, snowfall and extremes 1902–2003
Month	Jan	Feb	Mar	Apr	May	Jun	Jul	Aug	Sep	Oct	Nov	Dec	Year
Record high °F (°C)	72 (22)	80 (27)	78 (26)	85 (29)	96 (36)	96 (36)	102 (39)	104 (40)	97 (36)	94 (34)	79 (26)	75 (24)	104 (40)
Mean maximum °F (°C)	60.2 (15.7)	62.3 (16.8)	65.7 (18.7)	71.9 (22.2)	79.5 (26.4)	86.7 (30.4)	90.4 (32.4)	89.5 (31.9)	86.4 (30.2)	79.4 (26.3)	69.1 (20.6)	61.9 (16.6)	90.8 (32.7)
Mean daily maximum °F (°C)	45.1 (7.3)	47.0 (8.3)	51.0 (10.6)	57.2 (14.0)	65.3 (18.5)	74.7 (23.7)	81.6 (27.6)	81.5 (27.5)	75.4 (24.1)	64.9 (18.3)	49.2 (9.6)	44.0 (6.7)	61.4 (16.3)
Daily mean °F (°C)	34.4 (1.3)	36.2 (2.3)	38.5 (3.6)	43.4 (6.3)	50.2 (10.1)	57.8 (14.3)	64.0 (17.8)	62.9 (17.2)	58.5 (14.7)	50.5 (10.3)	41.2 (5.1)	35.8 (2.1)	47.6 (8.7)
Mean daily minimum °F (°C)	24.3 (−4.3)	25.1 (−3.8)	27.2 (−2.7)	30.3 (−0.9)	36.1 (2.3)	42.3 (5.7)	46.3 (7.9)	45.9 (7.7)	42.2 (5.7)	35.9 (2.2)	28.1 (−2.2)	24.6 (−4.1)	34.0 (1.1)
Mean minimum °F (°C)	8.1 (−13.3)	10.5 (−11.9)	12.8 (−10.7)	18.4 (−7.6)	25.7 (−3.5)	31.6 (−0.2)	37.6 (3.1)	36.5 (2.5)	32.0 (0.0)	25.7 (−3.5)	17.1 (−8.3)	10.3 (−12.1)	4.1 (−15.5)
Record low °F (°C)	−5 (−21)	−8 (−22)	−2 (−19)	6 (−14)	13 (−11)	24 (−4)	31 (−1)	30 (−1)	23 (−5)	13 (−11)	4 (−16)	−14 (−26)	−14 (−26)
Average precipitation inches (mm)	12.63 (321)	13.86 (352)	10.95 (278)	6.20 (157)	3.76 (96)	1.38 (35)	0.28 (7.1)	0.31 (7.9)	1.63 (41)	3.77 (96)	10.77 (274)	13.10 (333)	78.64 (1,998)
Average snowfall inches (cm)	53.8 (137)	49.0 (124)	49.1 (125)	23.5 (60)	6.4 (16)	0.5 (1.3)	0.0 (0.0)	0.0 (0.0)	0.1 (0.25)	2.5 (6.4)	17.9 (45)	40.5 (103)	243.3 (617.95)
Average precipitation days (≥ 0.01 in)	12	12	12	9	7	4	1	1	3	5	9	11	87
Source: WRCC (temperature and precipitation averages 1981–2010, other values 1902-2003)
