= Nevada Irrigation District =

Coordinates: 39.2228°N 121.0726°W

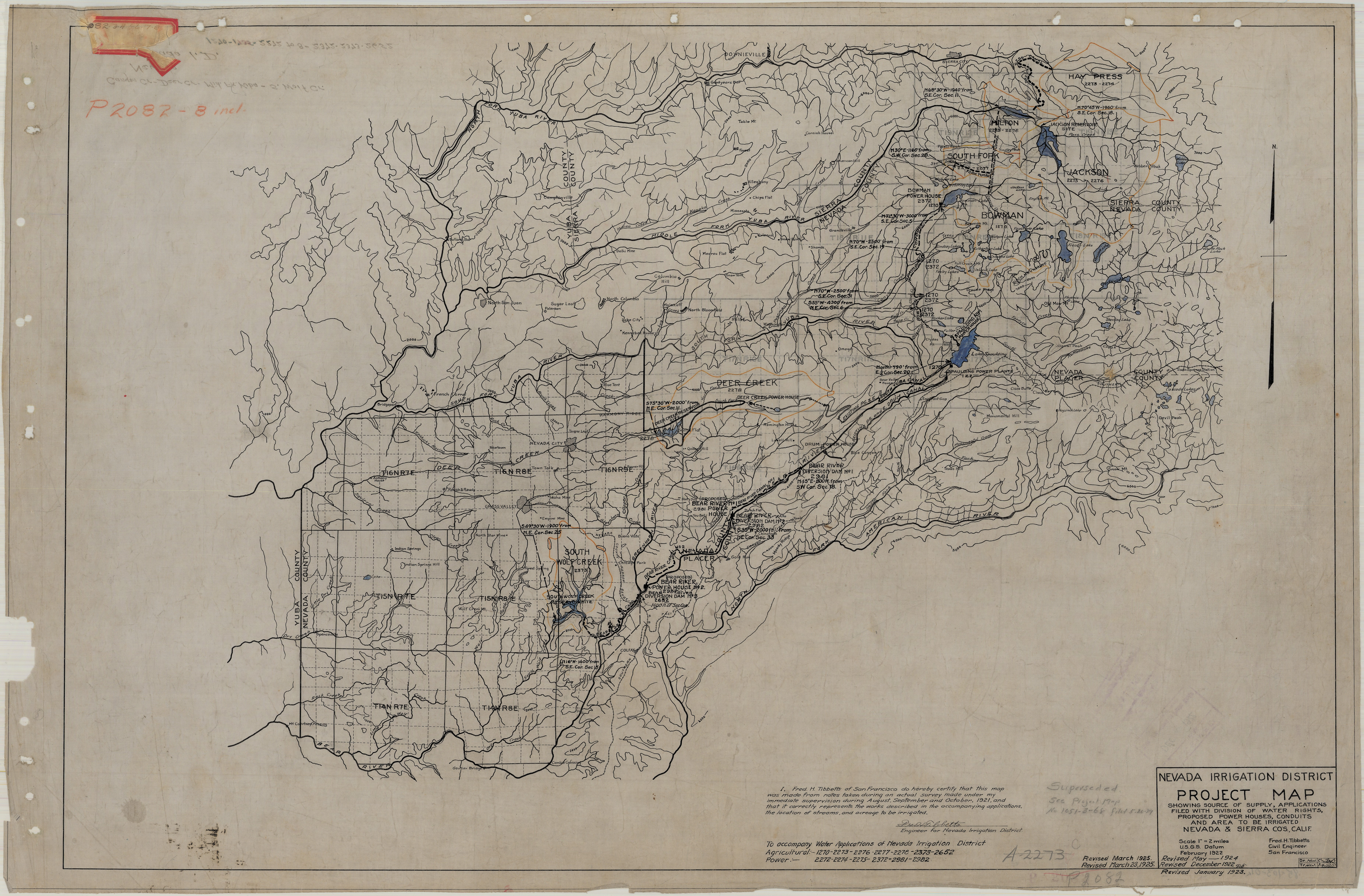
1922 Nevada Irrigation District Project Map

Nevada Irrigation District (NID) is an agency in Northern California that supplies water for much of Nevada County and portions of Placer and Yuba Counties. The water is used for irrigation, municipal and domestic purposes. It was established in 1921.

The Nevada Irrigation District owns and operates a system of ten reservoirs, many part of the Yuba-Bear Hydroelectric Project. These include:

- Bowman Reservoir, 68,510 acre-feet (84,510,000 m^{3})
- Combie Reservoir, 5,555 acre-feet (6,852,000 m^{3})
- Faucherie Reservoir, 3,980 acre-feet (4,910,000 m^{3})
- French Lake Reservoir, 13,800 acre-feet (17,000,000 m^{3})
- Jackson Lake Reservoir, 1,130 acre-feet (1,390,000 m^{3})
- Jackson Meadows Reservoir, 69,205 acre-feet (85,363,000 m^{3})
- Rollins Reservoir, 65,988 acre-feet (81,395,000 m^{3})
- Sawmill Reservoir, 3,030 acre-feet (3,740,000 m^{3})
- Scotts Flat Reservoir, 48,547 acre-feet (59,882,000 m^{3})

The district also has seven hydroelectric plants. Unlike many of California's irrigation districts, it is not an electrical utility.
