= Lake Spaulding Dam =

Dam in California, US

Coordinates: 39°19′38″N 120°38′34″W

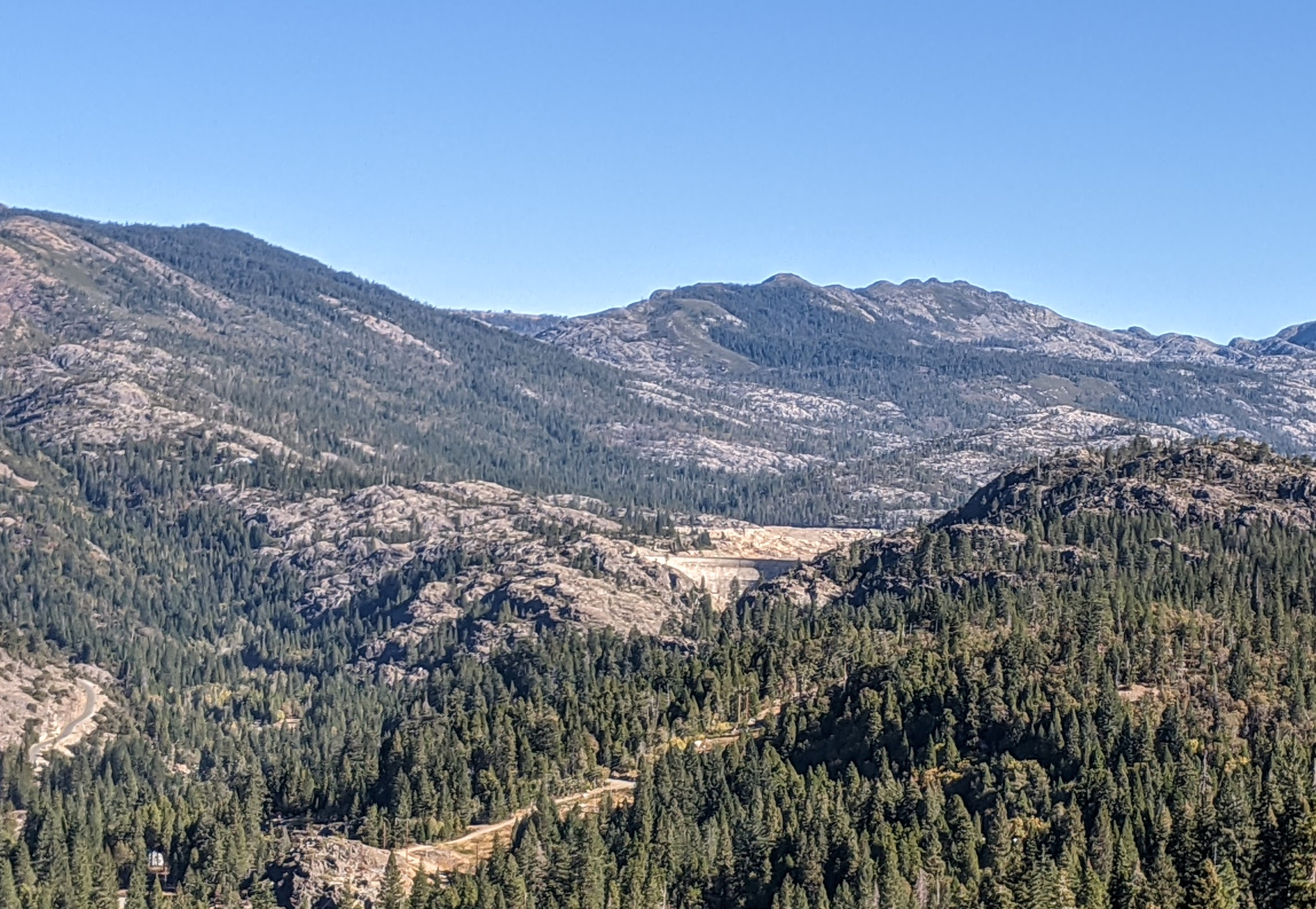
Lake Spaulding Dam from Emigrant Gap vista point off Interstate 80

Lake Spaulding Dam (National ID # CA00358) is a dam in Nevada County, California.

Owned and operated by Pacific Gas & Electric for hydroelectric power generation, the 275-foot (84 m)-high dam was designed by John R. Freeman and completed in 1913 (113 years ago).

It impounds the South Fork of the Yuba River, which originates near Donner Pass. At the time of construction it was the highest dam in California, and one of ten PG&E hydroelectric facilities. A temporary camp called Camp Spaulding, California was established to house workers on the dam during its construction.

Lake Spaulding, the reservoir created by the dam, has a capacity of 74,773 acre-feet (92,231,000 m^{3}) and supports recreational camping, boating, fishing, and underwater diving.

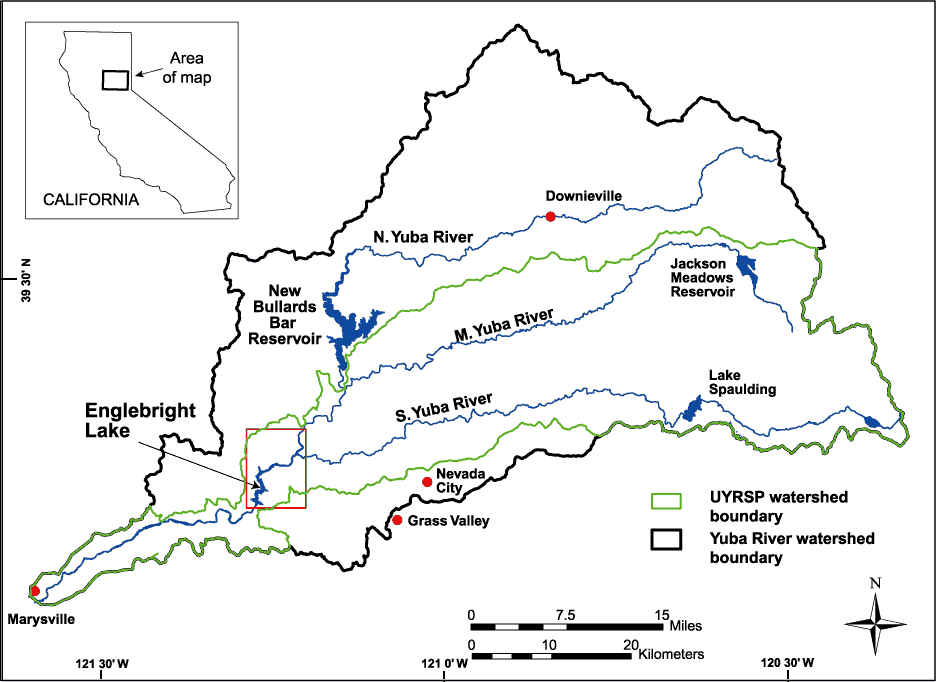
Yuba River watershed

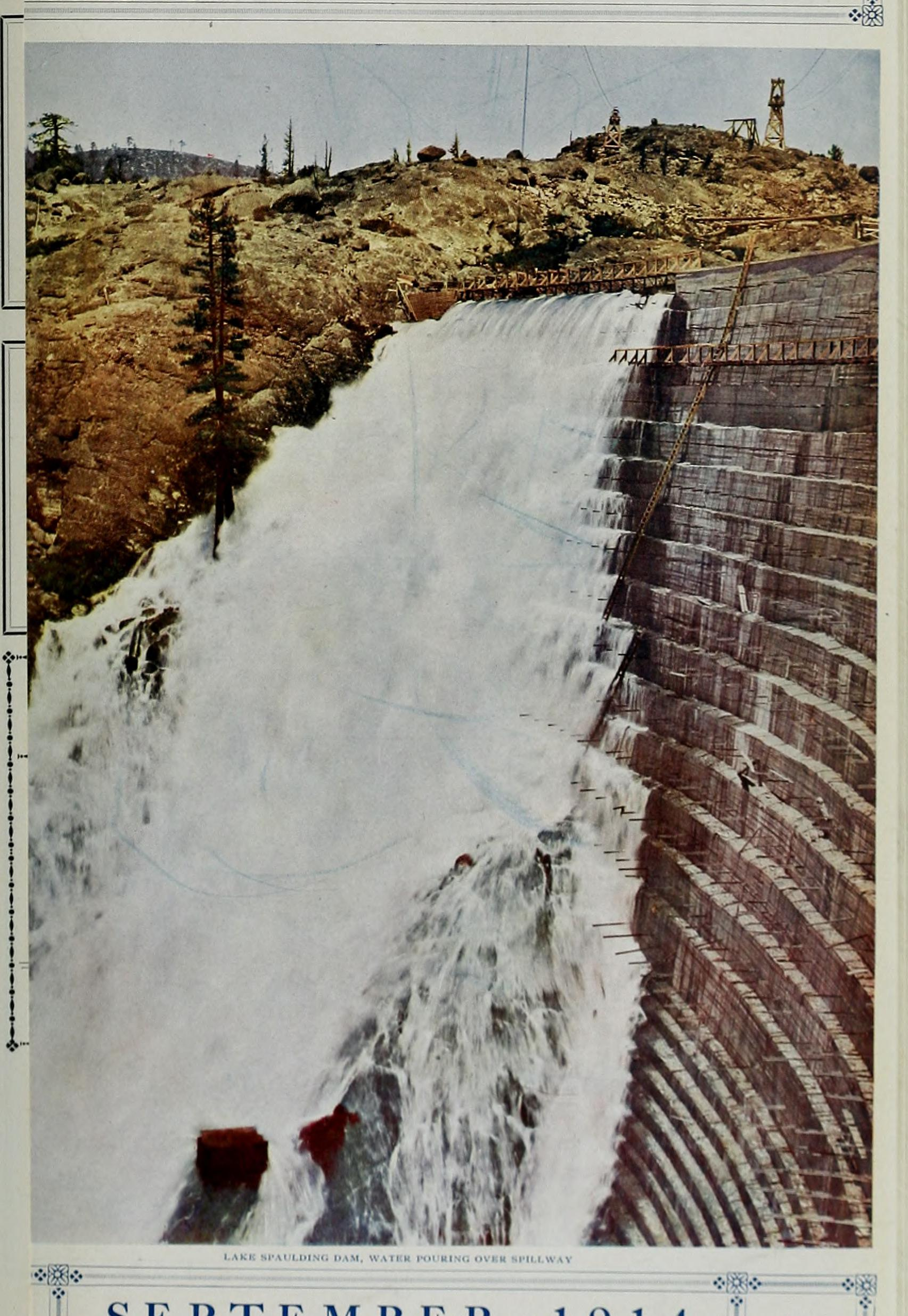
Lake Spaulding Dam overflowing in 1914

== Climate ==
Climate data for Lake Spaulding, California, 1991–2020 normals
Month	Jan	Feb	Mar	Apr	May	Jun	Jul	Aug	Sep	Oct	Nov	Dec	Year
Mean daily maximum °F (°C)	43.9 (6.6)	45.8 (7.7)	50.6 (10.3)	56.0 (13.3)	63.8 (17.7)	74.6 (23.7)	82.1 (27.8)	81.5 (27.5)	76.3 (24.6)	64.8 (18.2)	51.3 (10.7)	42.9 (6.1)	61.1 (16.2)
Daily mean °F (°C)	34.5 (1.4)	36.0 (2.2)	38.9 (3.8)	43.2 (6.2)	50.5 (10.3)	58.8 (14.9)	65.2 (18.4)	64.3 (17.9)	60.1 (15.6)	50.8 (10.4)	40.4 (4.7)	34.0 (1.1)	48.1 (8.9)
Mean daily minimum °F (°C)	25.1 (−3.8)	26.1 (−3.3)	27.1 (−2.7)	30.4 (−0.9)	37.2 (2.9)	42.9 (6.1)	48.3 (9.1)	47.1 (8.4)	43.9 (6.6)	36.8 (2.7)	29.5 (−1.4)	25.1 (−3.8)	35.0 (1.7)
Source: NOAA

== See also ==
- List of dams and reservoirs in California
- List of lakes in California
