= Ølsted =

Ølsted may refer to:

- Ølsted, Halsnæs Municipality, a town in Denmark
- Ølsted, Aarhus Municipality, a village in Denmark

== See also ==
- Olmsted (disambiguation)
- Ørsted (disambiguation)
