= John Olmsted =

John Olmsted may refer to:

- John Olmsted (naturalist), California naturalist and conservationist
- John Charles Olmsted, American landscape architect
- John W. Olmsted, American historian of early modern Europe
