= South Yuba River =

South Yuba River South Fork
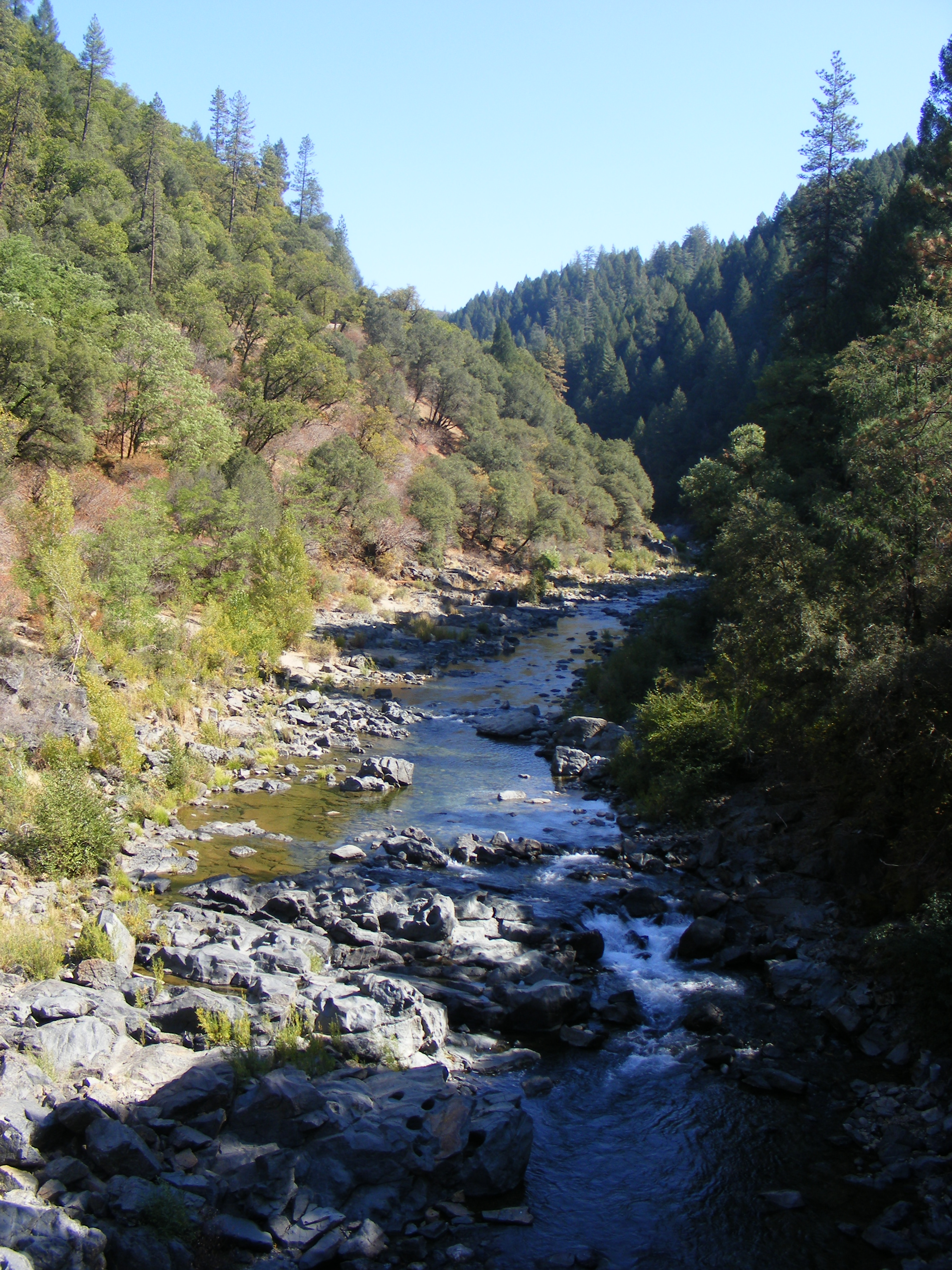
- View of South Yuba from N Bloomfield Road Nevada City, CA

Location
- Country: United States
- State: California
- Region: Upper Yuba Watershed

Physical characteristics
- Source: Lake Angela
  - location: Tahoe National Forest
- Mouth: Englebright Lake
  - location: Yuba River
- Length: 65 mi (105 km), east-west
- Basin size: 340 mi^{2} (880 km^{2})
- Discharge
  - location: near Jones Bar
  - average: 454 cu ft/s (12.9 m^{3}/s)
  - minimum: 1 cu ft/s (0.028 m^{3}/s)
  - maximum: 53,600 cu ft/s (1,520 m^{3}/s)
- Namesakes: South Yuba River State Park; South Yuba River Citizens League

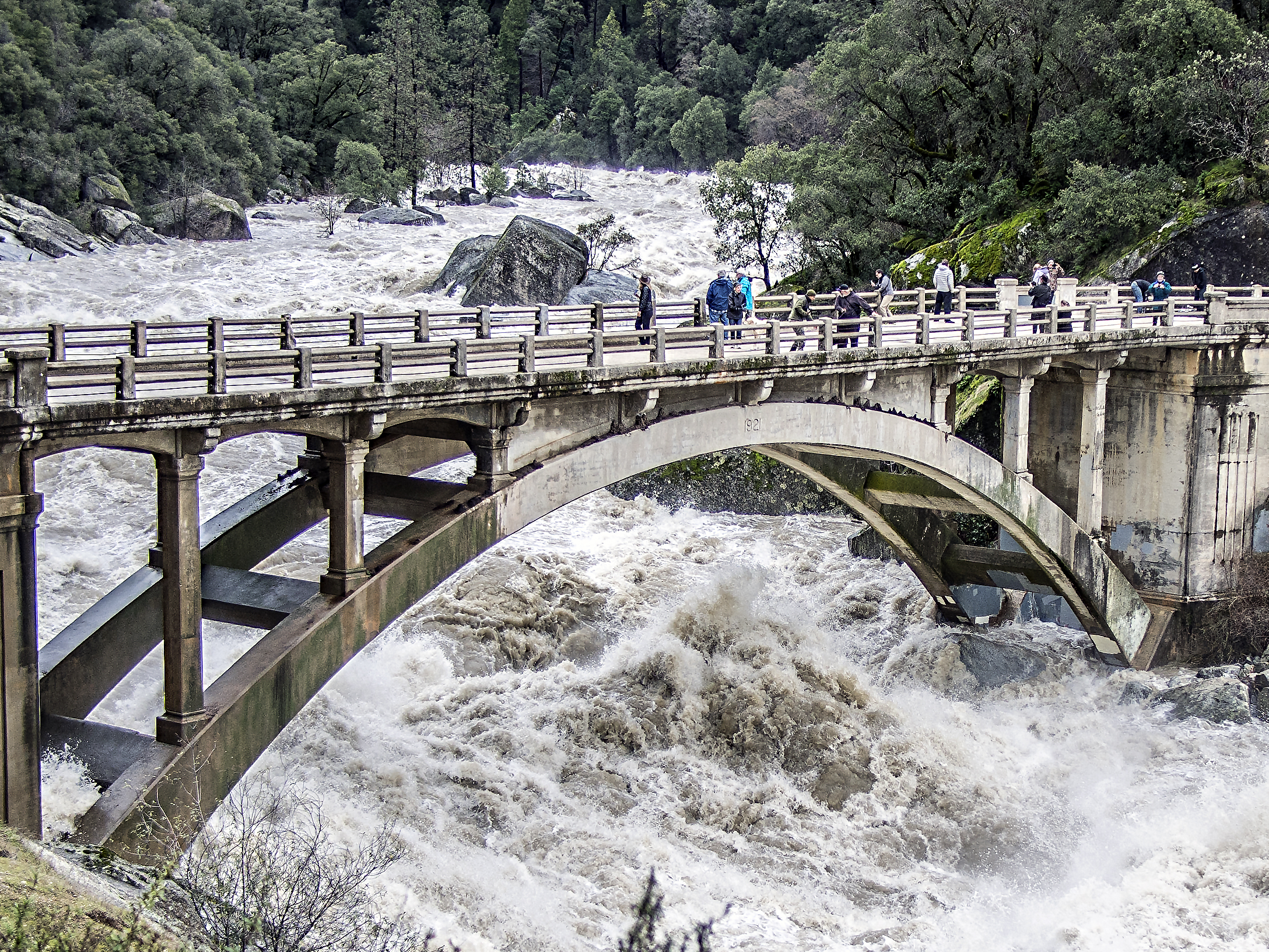
High water in the South Yuba River at the old CA-49 bridge, 8 January 2017

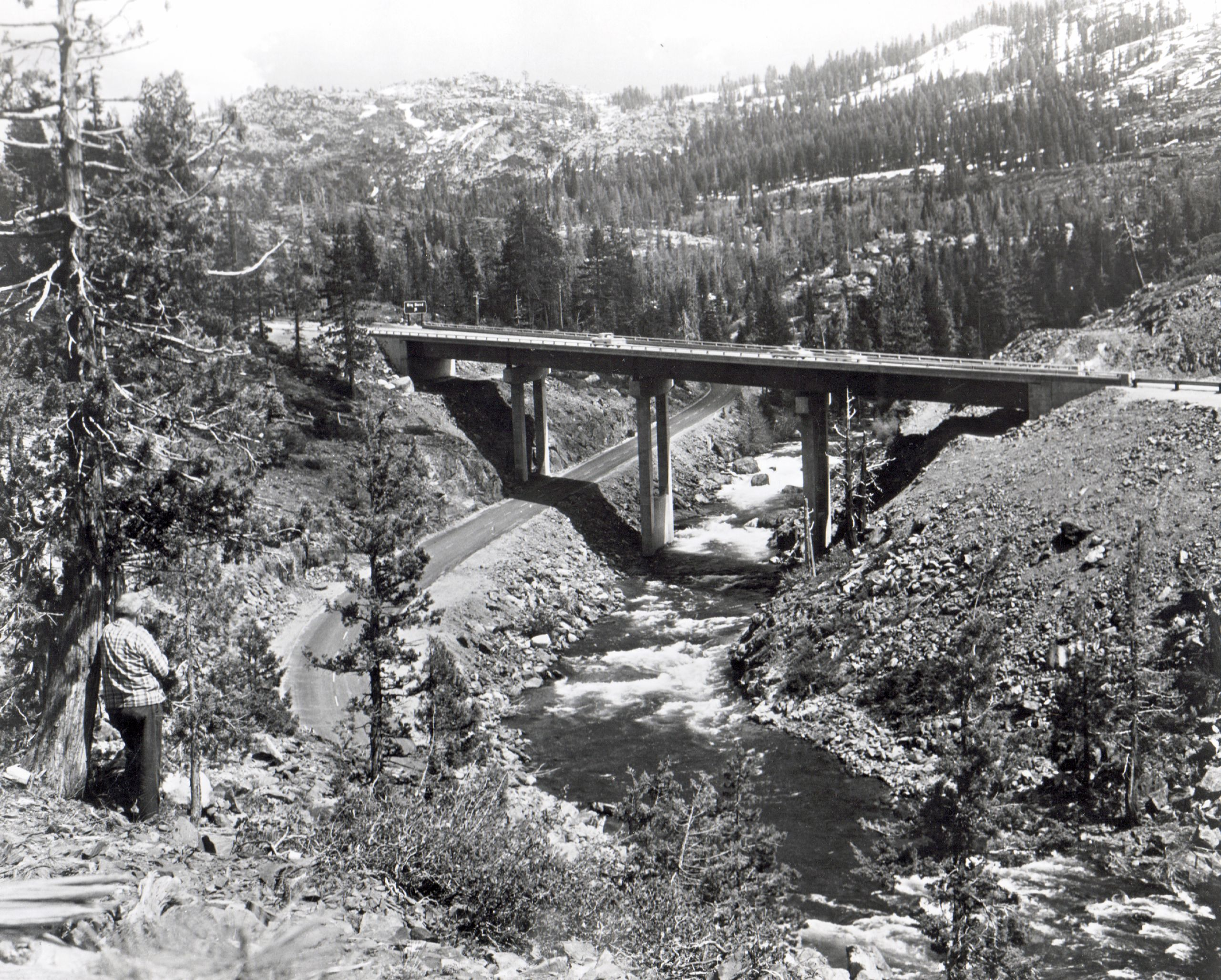
Interstate 80 East crossing the South Yuba River in Placer County (1965)

The 65.0-mile-long (104.6 km) South Yuba River is a left-entering tributary of the Yuba River originating in the northern Sierra Nevada at Lake Angela in Nevada County about three quarters of a mile north of Donner Pass, about three miles east of the town of Soda Springs. After passing through Lake Van Norden with Upper Castle Creek (longer than the Lake Angela stem) entering from the right, it gathers numerous snow-fed tributaries running west through a marshy, lake-filled valley, criss-crossing Interstate 80. The river briefly enters Placer County, then flows into Lake Spaulding, then plunges westward into a steep-sided valley. Canyon Creek enters from the right, then Poorman Creek also from the right near the town of Washington. The river continues west into the foothills, crossing under State Route 49. Its mouth is on the east shore of upper Englebright Lake, formed by a dam across the Yuba River.

The California Office of Environmental Health Hazard Assessment has issued a safe eating advisory for any fish caught in South Yuba River due to elevated levels of mercury and PCBs.

== Recreation ==
The river begins within the Tahoe National Forest. Parks along or near the South Yuba River include:

- Malakoff Diggins State Historic Park
- South Yuba River State Park

== Course ==
South Yuba River course This list is incomplete; you can help by expanding it.
description	coordinates
source, Lake Angela dam	39.3221273°N 120.3268679°W
road, I-80 WB	
dam, Lake Van Norden	
road, I-80 EB	
confluence, Lower Castle Creek	
road, I-80 WB	
road, Hampshire Rocks	
road, I-80 EB	
confluence, Rattlesnake Creek	
road, I-80 WB	
dam, Lake Spaulding	
confluence, Jordan Creek	
confluence, Rucker Creek	39.344374°N 120.679491°W
confluence, Clear Creek	39.353467°N 120.699527°W
confluence, Diamond Creek	39.355159°N 120.740441°W
confluence, Canyon Creek	39.360867°N 120.750156°W
confluence, Scotchman Creek	39.356644°N 120.783104°W
road, Washington	39.360493°N 120.794766°W
confluence, Poorman Creek	39.352834°N 120.810291°W
confluence, McKilligan Creek	39.352193°N 120.818654°W
border, Tahoe National Forest	39.337451°N 120.908704°W
confluence, Humbug Creek	39.338115°N 120.931932°W
border, Malakoff Diggins State Historic Park	39.337384°N 120.90909°W
road, N Bloomfield (Edwards Crossing)	39.3301664°N 120.984215°W
border, Malakoff Diggins SHP border, South Yuba River SP	39.330015°N 120.985351°W
confluence, Spring Creek	39.332148°N 120.989408°W
road, Purdon (Purdon Crossing)	39.327791°N 121.046505°W
confluence, Rock Creek	39.311770°N 121.049323°W
former diversion, Excelsior Ditch	39.311070°N 121.061631°W
road, CA 49 (bridge image)	
confluence, Rush Creek	39.292248°N 121.104803°W
confluence, Owl Creek	
confluence, French Corral Creek	
road, Pleasant Valley	39.29286°N 121.193576°W
border, South Yuba River SP road, Bridgeport Covered Bridge	39.292739°N 121.194906°W
mouth, Englebright Lake	

== See also ==
- North Yuba River
- Yuba River topics
- Tributaries of the Feather River
