= Hans Ørsted =

Hans Ørsted may refer to:

- Hans Christian Ørsted (1777–1851), Danish chemist and physicist
- Hans-Henrik Ørsted (born 1954), Danish track cyclist

== See also ==
- Ørsted (disambiguation)
