= Nevada City Jane Doe =

Unidentified murder victim

- Status: Unidentified for 41 years, 7 months and 23 days
- Died: Nevada City, California, U.S.
- Cause of death: Homicide by strangulation
- Known for: Unidentified victim of homicide
- Height: Approximately 5 ft 0 in (1.52 m) to 5 ft 8 in (1.73 m)

Nevada City Jane Doe is an unidentified murder victim whose body was found on July 8, 1984. Her body was found off an embankment on Independence Trail in Nevada City, California.

== Discovery of the body ==
On July 8, 1984, two hikers found a young woman's body approximately 50 meters down an embankment near Highway 84 and South Yuba Bridge. She had been concealed by heavy manzanita bush cover before she was found. When discovered, her remains were nearly completely skeletonized. The woman was described to be Caucasian, and was estimated to be between 18 and 30 years old. She was estimated to have stood between 5 ft and 5 ft 8 inches, and had shoulder length dark blonde to light brown hair.

She was found with several pieces of distinctive clothing and accessories. One of the most distinctive was a gold toned floral ring with an oval opal stone in the center. She wore a long sleeve, red cotton shirt with an embroidered tiger on it. The tag of this shirt had been cut off. She also had a large men's red, tan, and blue button up shirt from JCPenney. She wore a matching red, tan, and blue handkerchief wrapped around her right ankle. Her pants were size 8 blue Calvin Klein jeans which had been tailored to be smaller. For footwear, she wore white and red tube socks along with blue and white size 5 Nike tennis shoes.

== Investigation ==
An autopsy determined that the woman had been there for approximately 10 to 35 days before she was found, placing her death around June 1984. She was killed by ligature strangulation, and was found with a black electrical cord wrapped around her neck. She also suffered from blunt force trauma. It was determined that she likely was killed elsewhere before being dumped at the location she was found.

The clothing the woman was found wearing was much heavier than what was typical wear for summers in the greater Sacramento County area. This has led investigators to theorize that she may have been from out of town, specifically from a place with a colder climate. Areas with such colder climates near Nevada City include the Sierra Nevada region to the east and the Mount Shasta region to the north.

DNA from this Jane Doe's remains have been extracted and have been entered into CODIS and VICAP with no match. A NAMUS case for her was published on October 25, 2021. In December 2023, a new push for information was published by the Nevada County sheriff's office, hoping to revitalize the investigation.

== See also ==
- List of unsolved murders (1900–1979)
- Emigrant Gap Jane Doe
