= John Olmsted (naturalist) =

American conservationist

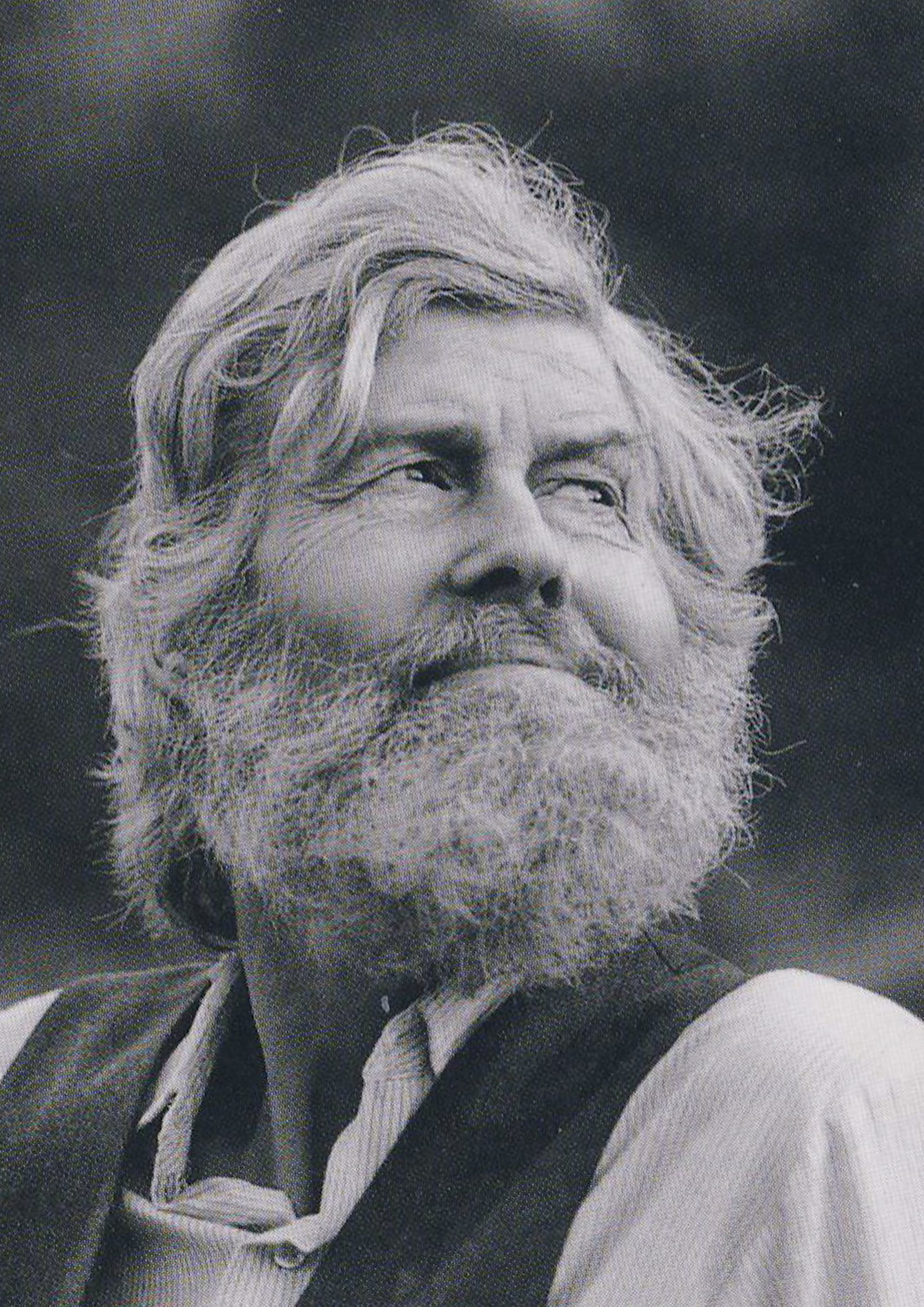
- Born: John De Vaux Olmsted; March 2, 1938; Los Angeles, California, U.S.
- Died: March 8, 2011 (aged 73); Nevada City, California, U.S.
- Education: Bachelor of Arts degree from Pomona College, and a Master's degree in Plant Ecology at Claremont Graduate University
- Occupations: Conservationist, Naturalist, Botanist, Strybing Arboretum, Oakland Museum
- Known for: Founding the California Institute of Man in Nature, Jug Handle State Natural Reserve, Cross California Ecological Trail, Independence Trail, Yuba (Colgate) Powerhouse, Earth Planet Museum, Oakland Museum of California
- Spouse(s): Priscilla Dahlgren, Sally Cates
- Children: Erik Olmsted, Alden Olmsted

John D. Olmsted (March 2, 1938 – March 8, 2011) was an American naturalist and conservationist most famous for creating the Independence Trail in Nevada City, California, as well as helping to save numerous other parcels across California, including Jug Handle State Natural Reserve in Casper, California, Goat Mountain in the Berryessa Snow Mountain Wilderness and the Bridgeport Covered Bridge. His efforts and vision of a park at Bridgeport led to the creation of the South Yuba River State Park, a 39-mile (63 km) length of Nationally protected Wild and Scenic land along the South Yuba River in Nevada County, California. Olmsted patterned his life after that of fellow environmentalist John Muir, with his trademark beard, formal clothing, and poetic and spiritual leanings towards the benefits of time spent in nature.

He earned a master's degree in plant ecology at Pomona College and became education director at Golden Gate Park in San Francisco, California. He worked as a naturalist, docent and educator at the Oakland Museum, UC Berkeley Extension and the Mendocino Art Center.

He founded the Earth Planet Museum in Grass Valley as a tribute to John Muir and to environmentalism in California, and as a visual history of recorded audio and alternate technologies. During his time in Mendocino, he worked with Hans Jenny to recognize and preserve the Pygmy Forest, which is located within the boundaries of Jug Handle. His dream of a cross-California hiking trail remains the focus and goal of his devoted followers. He was a resident of Nevada City, California, and is survived by his two sons, Erik Olmsted and Alden Olmsted.
