= Olmsted (name) =

Olmstead
Origin
- Language: English
- Region of origin: British Isles

Other names
- Variant forms: Armistead, Armitstead, Armystead, Armstead, Olmstead, Ormstead, Ampstead

Olmsted is a surname. Notable people with the surname include:

- The notable Olmsted family of New York City:
  - Frederick Law Olmsted, American landscape architect
    - his sons John Charles Olmsted and Frederick Law Olmsted Jr., also landscape architects, and their company Olmsted Brothers
    - John Charles Olmsted (1852–1920), landscape architect, adopted son of Frederick Law Olmsted
  - Frederick Olmsted Jr. (1911–1990), WPA artist, muralist, and scientist (son of Frederick E. Olmsted)
  - Frederick E. Olmsted (1872–1925), American Forester (nephew of Frederick Law Olmsted)
  - George W. Olmsted (b. 1874), founder of Long Island Lighting Company (LILCo), patron of the Chief Cornplanter Council, Boy Scouts of America
  - George H. Olmsted (b. 1901), veteran of World War I and World War II, General in the United States Army, life insurance magnate, and philanthropist
- Aaron Olmsted, investor in the Connecticut Land Company in the United States
- Andrew J. Olmsted, a U.S. soldier during the Iraq occupation
- Anna Wetherill Olmsted (1888–1961), American museum director and art critic
- Charles M. Olmsted (1881–1948), an American aeronautical engineer
- Dan Olmsted, a senior editor for United Press International (UPI) and author of the Age of Autism reports
- David Olmsted (1822–1861), an American politician
- Denison Olmsted, an American astronomer
- Elizabeth Martha Olmsted (1825–1910), American poet
- John Olmsted (naturalist) (1938–2011), an American naturalist and conservationist
- John W. Olmsted (1903–1986), an American historian
- Nathan Olmsted (1812–1898), an American politician
- Richard Olmsted (settler) (died 1686/7), early New England (Connecticut) settler
- Thomas Olmsted, an American prelate of the Catholic Church
- Katharine (Kit) Olmsted (2001-), an American amateur athlete, NCAA Division I Champion
