= Olmstead =

Olmstead may refer to:

== People ==
- Aaron Olmsted (1753–1806), sometime historically misspelled as Aaron Olmstead, New England sea captain
- Albert T. Olmstead (1880–1945) American assyriologist
- Bert Olmstead (1926–2015), Canadian ice hockey player
- Charles H. Olmstead (1837–1926), Confederate colonel
- Charles Sanford Olmsted (1853–1918), Episcopal bishop of Colorado
- Charles Tyler Olmstead (1842–1824), Episcopal bishop of Central New York
- David Olmstead, Canadian politician
- Denison Olmstead (1791–1859), American astronomer
- Gertrude Olmstead (1897–1975), American actress
- Marla Olmstead (born 2000), American abstract artist
- Matt Olmstead, American writer and producer for television shows
- C. Michelle Olmstead (born 1969), American astronomer
- Roy Olmstead (1886–1966), famous bootlegger during American prohibition
- Robert Olmstead (born 1954), American novelist and educator
- Stephen G. Olmstead (1929–2022), American Army officer

== Case law ==
- Olmstead v. United States, a 1928 decision of the United States Supreme Court concerning the legality of wiretapping by government officials
- Olmstead v. L.C., a 1999 decision of the United States Supreme Court defining the right of people with mental disabilities to live in the community rather than institutions

== Other ==
- Lake Olmstead Stadium, stadium in Augusta, Georgia used primarily by the Augusta GreenJackets baseball team

== See also ==
- Olmsted (disambiguation)
  - Olmsted (name)
