= Bridgeport, Nevada County, California =

Bridgeport
- Former settlement
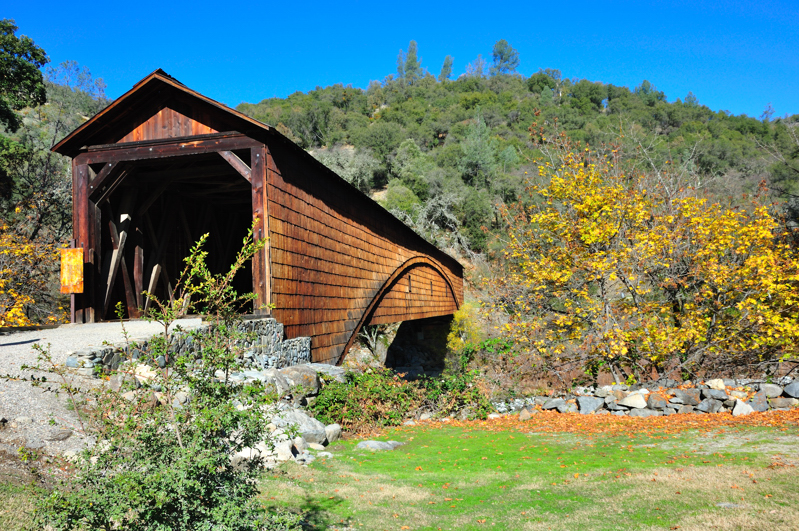
- Bridgeport Covered Bridge, a well-known local landmark

- Location in California
- Coordinates: 39°17′30″N 121°11′37″W
- Country: United States
- State: California
- County: Nevada County
- Elevation: 581 ft (177 m)

Bridgeport (also: Nyes Landing and Nye's Crossing) is a former settlement on the Yuba River in Nevada County, California, 2 mi (3.2 km) from the town of French Corral. Its elevation is 567 ft (173 m) above sea level.

It is notable for the Bridgeport Covered Bridge, a national and state historic landmark, used as a pedestrian crossing over the South Yuba River. The South Yuba River State Park is adjacent.

== History ==
In 1849, as part of the California Gold Rush, brothers Urias and Manual Nye built a trading post on the site.

== See also ==
- Yuba River topics
- Mining communities of the California Gold Rush
