= Englebright Dam =

Coordinates: 39°14′24.08″N 121°16′9.83″W

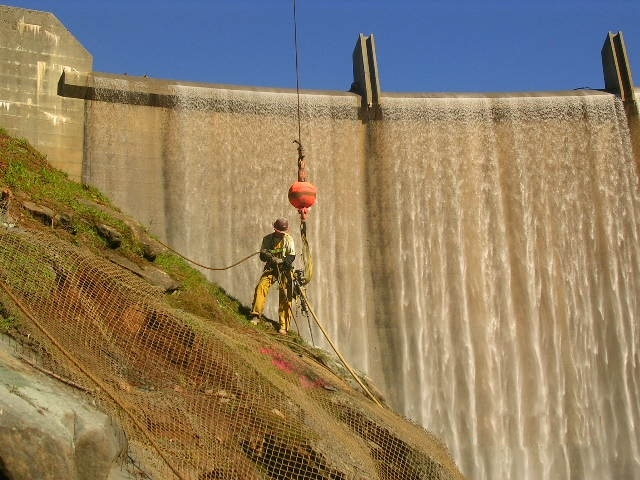
- A miner scaling the rock face below the dam during installation of the Narrows II Powerhouse Flow Bypass System in 2006
- Official name: Englebright Dam
- Location: Nevada / Yuba counties, California
- Opening date: 1941; 84 years ago

Dam and spillways
- Impounds: Yuba River
- Height: 260 ft (79 m)
- Width (base): 1,142 ft (348 m)

Reservoir
- Creates: Englebright Lake
- Total capacity: 70,000 acre-feet (86,000,000 m^{3})
- Surface area: 815 acres (3.3 km^{2})

Power Station
- Installed capacity: 58.8 MW
- Annual generation: 237,769,000 KWh (2001–2012)

Englebright Dam is a 280 ft (85 m) high variable radius concrete arch dam on the Yuba River in the Sacramento River Basin, located in Yuba and Nevada counties of California, United States. It was put into service in 1941 by the United States Army Corps of Engineers.

The dam was constructed in 1941 for the primary purpose of trapping sediment derived from anticipated hydraulic mining operations in the Yuba River watershed. Hydraulic mining in the Sierra Nevada was halted in 1884 but resumed on a limited basis until the 1930s during the great depression under the California Debris Commission. Although no hydraulic mining in the upper Yuba River watershed resumed after the construction of the dam, the historical mine sites continued to contribute sediment to the river. Today, Englebright Lake is used primarily for recreation and hydropower.

Englebright Lake is nestled in the scenic Sierra foothills east of Marysville. Constructed for the storage of hydraulic gold mining debris, Englebright Dam is a concrete arch structure. It spans 1,142 feet (348 m) across and is 260 feet (79 m) high. The dam is in the steep Yuba River gorge known as the Narrows, holding back a 9-mile-long (14 km) lake with a surface area of 815 acres (3.30 km^{2}; 330 ha). The lake is unique in that it offers boat-in camping only.

The 70,000-acre-foot (86,000,000 m^{3}) Englebright Reservoir provides water-based recreational benefits to the region and provides 45,000 acre-feet (56,000,000 m^{3}) of stored water-right capacity, which is released each year through dam operations to benefit fish downstream. Water is also diverted for regional domestic and agricultural uses. Hydroelectric generation from water stored behind Englebright produces about 294 million kilowatt hours of energy each year, or enough for the annual energy needs for 50,000 homes.

A new flow bypass system was installed in 2006 by the Yuba County Water Agency and Mitchell Engineering so that river flow requirements can be met during shut-downs of the Narrows II Powerhouse at the base of the dam.

Narrows 1 Powerhouse is further downstream and smaller than Narrows 2 Powerhouse.

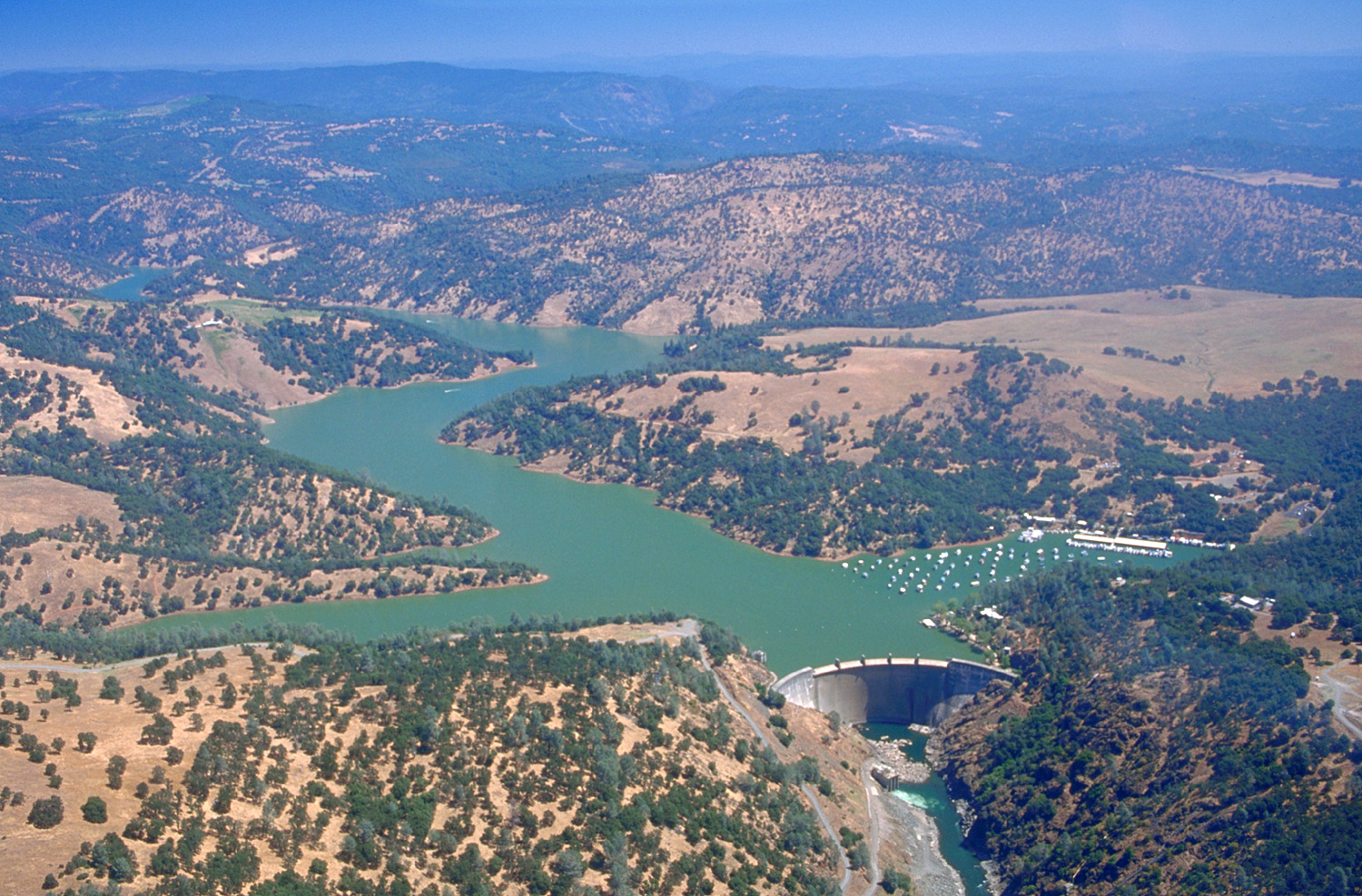
Aerial view of Englebright Dam and Lake on the Yuba River

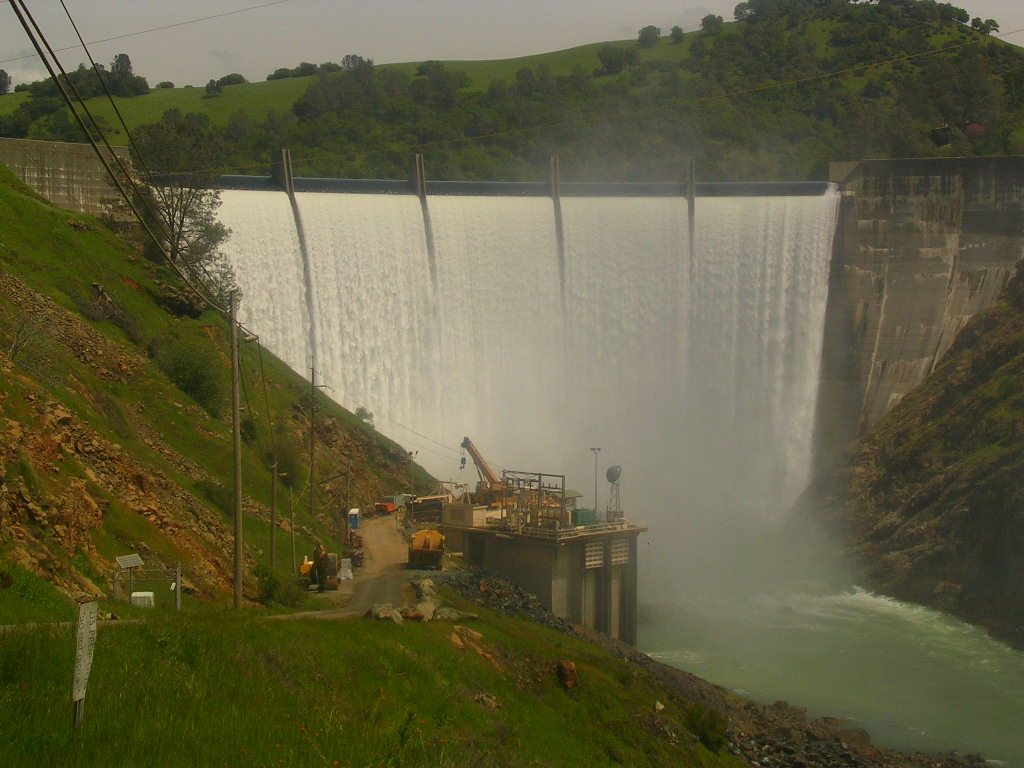
Englebright Dam during spring floods. Water is spilling over the dam's crest. Narrows II Powerhouse is visible at the base of the dam.

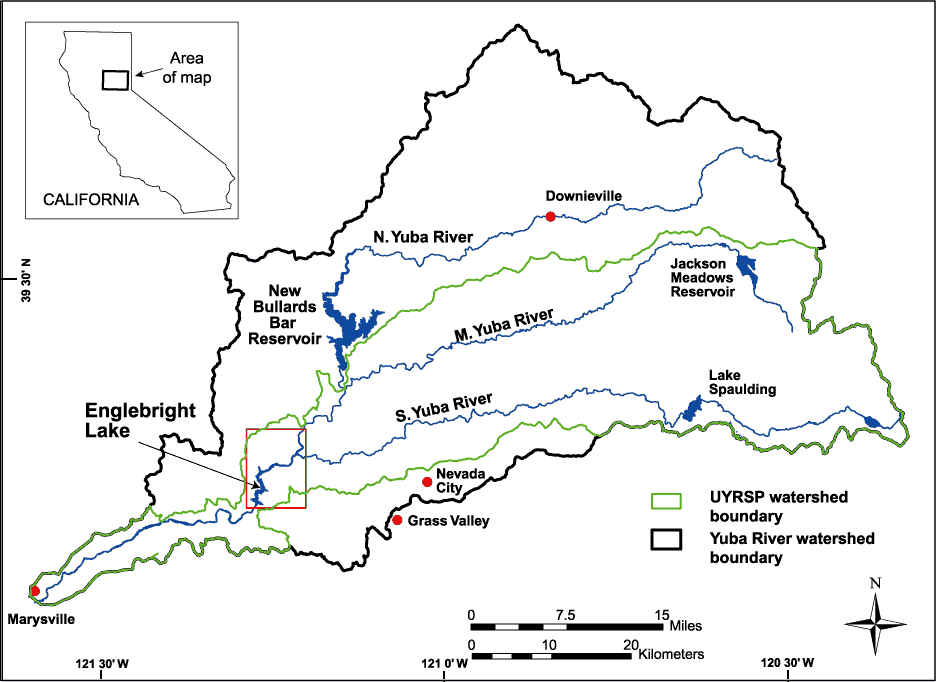
Map of the Yuba River watershed

== See also ==
- List of dams and reservoirs in California
- Yuba River topics
