= Olmsted =

Olmsted may refer to:

== People ==
- Olmsted (name)

== Places ==
- Olmsted Air Force Base, inactive since 1969
- Olmsted, Illinois
- Olmsted County, Minnesota
- Olmsted Falls, Ohio
- Olmsted Point, a viewing area in Yosemite National Park
- Olmsted Township, Cuyahoga County, Ohio
- North Olmsted, Ohio

== Other ==
- Olmsted Brothers, a landscape design firm founded by Frederick Law Olmsted's two sons
- Olmsted syndrome, a congenital keratoderma of the palms and soles

== See also ==
- Olmstead (disambiguation)
