= Independence Trail =

Nature Trail

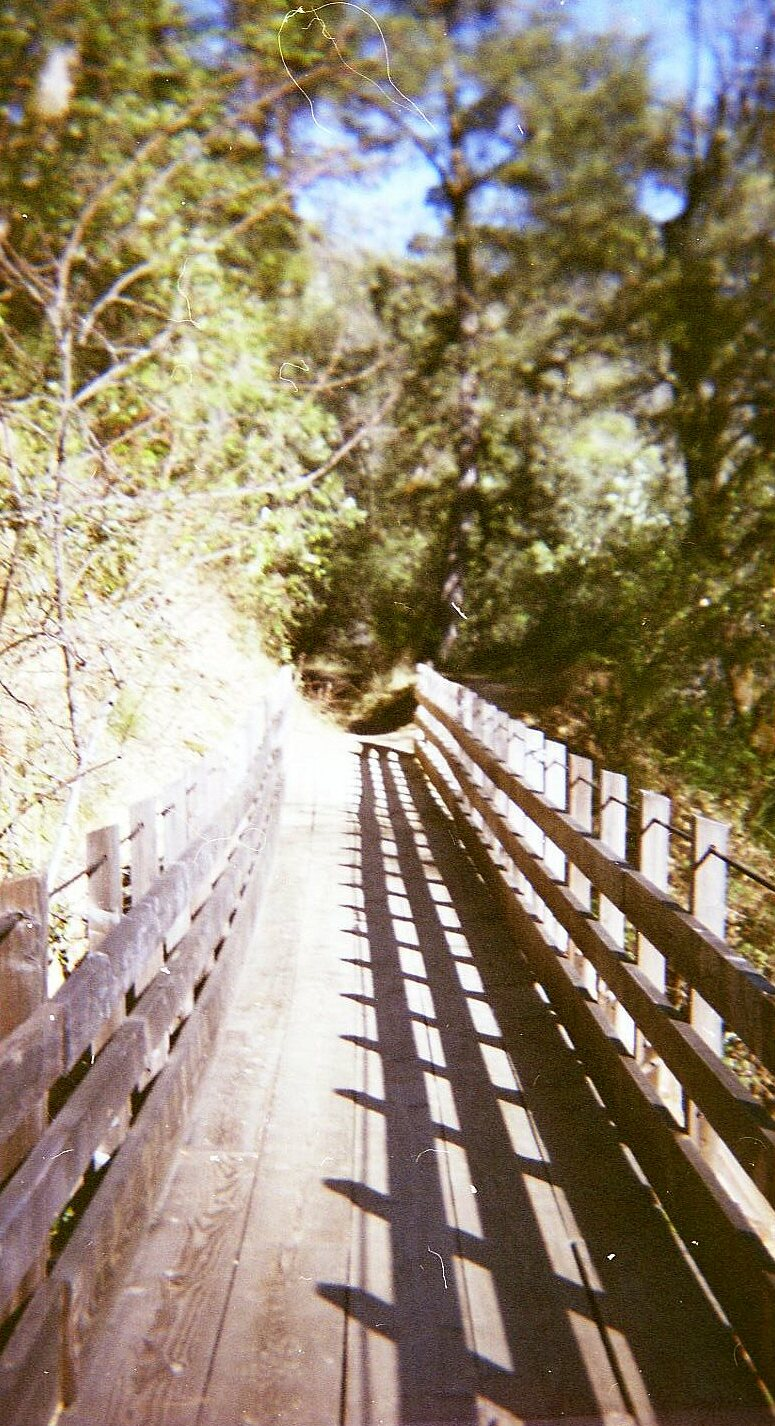
- Length: East, 2.2 miles (3.5 km); West, 2.5 miles (4.0 km)
- Trailheads: California State Highway 49, 39°17′29″N 121°05′52″W
- Elevation change: None

The Independence Trail is located approximately 7 miles from downtown Nevada City within the South Yuba River State Park in the Sierra Nevada foothills within Nevada County, in Northern California. The trail is the former Excelsior Ditch, which was found and repaired by John Olmsted and a large group of local volunteers. It is notable for being the first ADA approved wheelchair nature trail. It topped the list of "favorite trails for 2013" in The Sacramento Bee newspaper.

Founded by Olmsted and Sally Cates, and built with help from countless locals, the Independence Trail transformed the historic Excelsior gold mining ditch into the nation's first identified handicapped-accessible wilderness trail. It was one of the most popular trails in the area, contouring along wooded hillsides, passing live streams, and crossing deep gorges on restored wooden flumes that once transported water for hydraulic mining. Due to safety hazards caused by landslides from heavy storms in 2017 and the Jones Fire of 2020 destroying the wooden walkways, the trail is closed until further notice. It is in the process of being rebuilt.

The trail has two separate sections—West and East—that extend from one main trailhead on California State Route 49. Independence Trail West is oriented for most of its length around the canyon of Rush Creek, a large tributary stream that enters the South Yuba River at Jones Bar. The West trail features several wooden flumes, a large covered viewpoint, picnic tables and benches. Flume 28, over 500' in length, crosses above a waterfall on Rush Creek 1.1 miles west of the trailhead. It is a "must see" piece of mining history.

The Independence Trail utilizes the old Excelsior Canal, built between 1854 and 1859 by hundreds of Chinese laborers. To bring high pressure water for hydraulic mining. The ditch tapped the South Yuba river more than 2 miles upstream from here, and ran all the way to what is now the dam at Lake Wildwood, then by the China Ditch to the Smartsville mining district, 15 miles west of Grass Valley. After hydraulic mining was outlawed in the 1880s the "Excelsior Ditch" was used for agricultural irrigation until it was abandoned in 1963. In 1969, John Olmsted rediscovered the rock-lined ditches, adjacent paths for ditch tenders, and wooden flumes that provided access over ravines. It is a gold country gem and part of the South Yuba River State Park.

== See also ==
- Nevada City Jane Doe, unidentified decedent found off an embankment of Independence trail in 1984
