= Humbug Creek =

Stream in Oregon, U.S.

Coordinates: 42°15′07″N 123°09′21″W

Humbug Creek is a stream in the U.S. state of Oregon. It is a tributary to the Applegate River.

Humbug Creek received its name over a dispute ("humbug") between miners.
