= South Yuba River State Park =

State park in California, United States

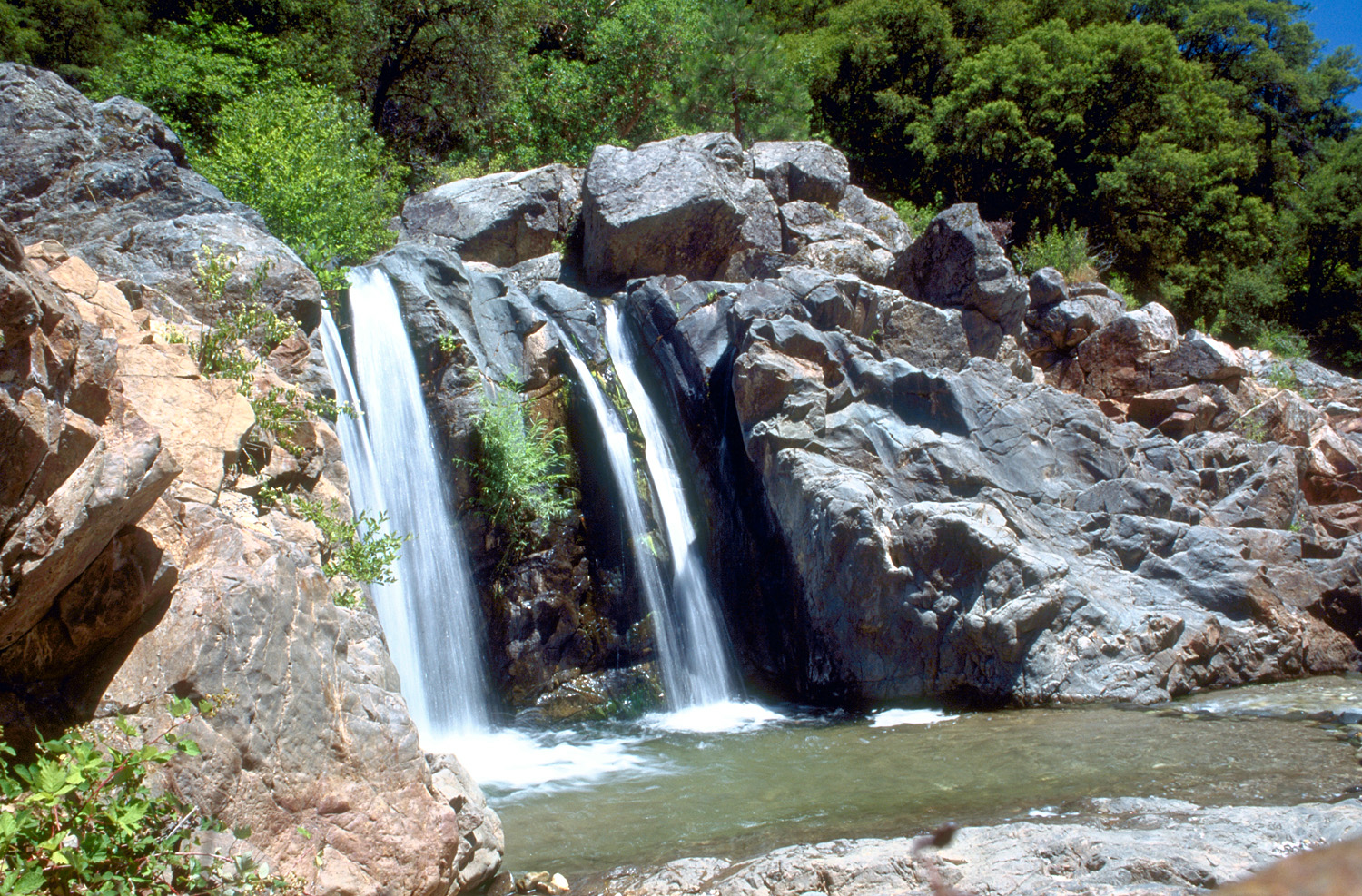
- A waterfall on the South Fork Yuba River in South Yuba River State Park

- Location within California Location within the United States
- Location: Nevada County, California, United States
- Coordinates: 39°17′30″N 121°11′40″W
- Area: 11,000 acres (45 km^{2})
- Governing body: California Department of Parks and Recreation

South Yuba River State Park is located along the South Fork of the Yuba River in the Sierra Nevada, within Nevada County, in Northern California.

== Geography ==
The park's 22 miles (35 km) portion of the South Yuba River Canyon stretches from Malakoff Diggins State Historic Park downstream to Bridgeport, where the visitor center and Bridgeport Covered Bridge are located.

The park protects over 11,000 acres (44.5 km^{2}), with 2,000 acres (8 km^{2}) by the California Department of Parks and Recreation, and 9,000 acres (36 km^{2}) by the federal Tahoe National Forest.

The park is accessed from Highway 20 west of Grass Valley or from Highway 49 north of Nevada City.

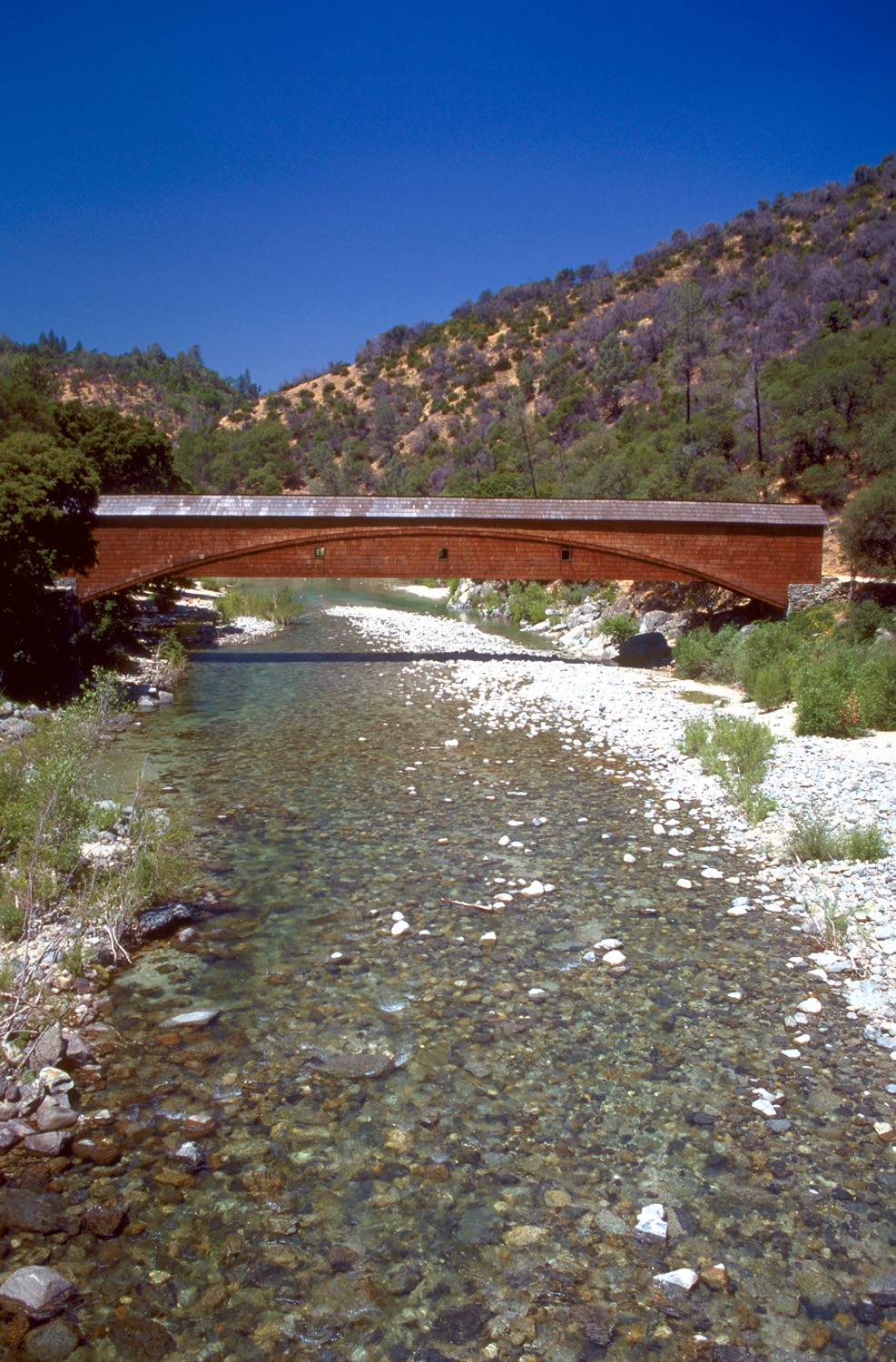
The Bridgeport Covered Bridge on the South Fork Yuba River in South Yuba River State Park

== Park features ==
The park is noted for:

- beauty of: the wild and scenic Yuba River pouring over massive granite ledges and along calm riparian meanders; and of diverse natural areas, with walking, hiking, mountain biking, and byway roadside access.
- natural history about the park's diverse: geology and granite rock formations; natural flora, forests, and wildflowers; and animals including birdwatching.
- historical gold mining connections and Gold Rush sites, with gold panning demonstrations. The area became an immigration destination during the 1849—early 1850s California Gold Rush.
- a number of 19th century bridges built along the length of this South Fork's section, including the 1862 Bridgeport Covered Bridge and 1865 Purdon Crossing bridge.
- The Independence Trail hiking and wheelchair - accessible nature trail.
- natural swimming holes, popular as summer temperatures in the surrounding communities reach triple digits.

== See also ==
- Malakoff Diggins State Historic Park — adjacent on northeast.
- List of California state parks
