= Ørsted (disambiguation) =

Hans Christian Ørsted (1777–1851) was a Danish physicist.

Ørsted, Orsted or Oersted may also refer to:

== People ==
- Anders Sandøe Ørsted (1778–1860), Danish politician and jurist, brother of Hans Christian Ørsted
- Anders Sandøe Ørsted (botanist) (1816–1872), Danish botanist, mycologist, zoologist and marine biologist
- Niels-Henning Ørsted Pedersen (1946–2005), Danish musician
- Hans-Henrik Ørsted (born 1954), Danish track cyclist
- MØ, professional name of Karen Marie Ørsted (born 1988), musician

== Places ==
- Ørsted, Denmark, town in Norddjurs Municipality
- Ørsted, village in Assens Municipality

== Other uses ==
- Oersted, the CGS unit of magnetic field strength
- Ørsted (company), a Danish power company
- Oersted (crater), on the Moon
- Ørsted (satellite), the first Danish satellite launched into orbit
- Oersted Medal, recognizes notable contributions to the teaching of physics
- Oersted, a character in 1994 role-playing video game Live A Live

== See also ==
- Ølsted (disambiguation), several inhabited places in Denmark
