= Murder of Melinda Beardsley =

Unidentified murder victim

Emigrant Gap Jane Doe
- Status: Identified on 18 March 2026
- Died: Emigrant Gap, California, U.S.
- Cause of death: Homicide by strangulation
- Known for: Unidentified victim of homicide
- Height: Approximately 5 ft 8 in (1.73 m)

Emigrant Gap Jane Doe was a formerly unidentified murder victim whose body was found on December 17, 1977, near the intersection of I-80 and Highway 20 in Emigrant Gap, California. Despite extensive investigation by the Placer County sheriff's office, no identification of this decedent was made at the time.

NamUs and The Doe Network announced that the woman had been identified in 2026. On 18 March 2026, the identity of the victim was released to the public as Melinda "Pip" Beardsley.

== Discovery of the body ==
At approximately 4 p.m. on December 17, 1977, a couple visiting from Sonoma County found the body of a nude woman 30 feet off I-80 while walking their dog. The woman was described as being caucasian, between the ages of 25 and 35, 5 feet 8 in height, and weighing 145 pounds. She had short, dark brown to black hair and brown eyes. She had a removable partial denture for her upper four front teeth. Her ears had been pierced. She was found to be wearing orange nail polish on her toes. A search of the area surrounding the body turned up no clothing or jewelry.

== Investigation ==
After the discovery of the body, a witness came forward and claimed to have seen the body being dumped about 3 hours before it was found by one of two Hispanic men in a Toyota Celica. The passenger of the Celica was seen attempting to drag something heavy out of the back seat. These men have never been identified or charged for her murder. Investigators considered the possibility of active serial killers at the time being suspects, such as Ted Bundy and the Hillside Strangler, though both were ruled out. Lack of forensic evidence at the scene lead investigators to believe that the woman had been killed elsewhere and dumped.

An autopsy on the body was performed on December 19, 1977. The autopsy determined that the woman had been killed about 2 to 6 days before being dumped. Marks on the woman's neck suggested that cause of death was manual strangulation. There was also evidence of trauma to the head. Despite being found nude, there was no evidence of sexual assault.

Pathologists noted that the woman had recently undergone significant weight loss, as indicated by stretch marks on her abdomen and breasts. It was theorized that this weight loss could have been caused by a prior pregnancy. She also was noted to have heavily calloused feet, which indicated that she may have walked a lot or had worn cheap/improperly fitted shoes in life. There was also some physical evidence to indicate she was a prostitute in life.

Police bulletins with a forensic reconstruction of the woman were circulated state and nationwide. Fingerprints were pulled from the body and sent to the California Department of Justice and the FBI, but no matches were found. Further efforts saw the sheriff's office sending the fingerprints to all agencies in the United States and Canada that had a fingerprint identification system at the time. Photos of the woman's dental plate were circulated nationwide in dental magazines but lead to no leads. Police also visited almost every brothel in the state of Nevada in the possibility that someone recognized her.

In 2024, two people were ruled out as this decedent; Laura Davis, missing from Dixon, California, and Doris Scandalis, missing from Carmichael, California.

In 2026, it was announced that the victim had been identified, and on 18 March 2026, the name of the victim was publicly released as Melinda "Pip" Beardsley.

== Burial ==
While investigators were attempting to uncover her identity, the woman's body was sent to the Sacramento County morgue and was frozen. After efforts failed to identify her at the time, she was given a paupers burial on November 6, 1978. The funeral arrangements were made by Chapel of the Hills in Auburn, and she is buried at the New Auburn Cemetery.

== See also ==
- List of unsolved murders (1900–1979)
