= John W. Olmsted =

American historian (1903–1986)

John Olmsted
- Born: 1903; Denver, Colorado, U.S.
- Died: 1986 (aged 82–83)
- Education: Deep Springs College; University of California, Berkeley (BA); Magdalen College, Oxford (BA); Cornell University (PhD)
- Spouses: Ruby Hay; Elizabeth Ross
- Children: 2, including John

John W. Olmsted (1903–1986) was an American historian of early modern Europe. He taught history at University of California, Los Angeles for 24 years and served as faculty representative to the Pacific Coast Conference for seven years. He also served as the first chairman of University of California, Riverside's Humanities Division.

== Education ==
Olmsted attended Los Angeles Polytechnic and Alhambra high schools. Olmsted received a scholarship from L. L. Nunn to attend Deep Springs College before finally enrolling at University of California, Los Angeles in 1920. Olmsted played varsity tennis at UCLA before transferring to University of California, Berkeley, during his junior year. Olmsted graduated from Berkeley in 1925 as a member of Phi Kappa Sigma, Phi Beta Kappa, and Theta Tau with degrees in engineering and geology. He turned down a geologist position with the Union Oil Company and accepted a Rhodes scholarship. (Note: As of 2014, Olmsted is one of only 11 UCLA students to become a Rhodes scholar.) Olmsted attended Oxford for a degree in history. While there, he played for their lawn tennis team, played Wimbledon in 1926, earned his "Blues" in 1927, and captained the team in 1928.

== Teaching ==
Olmsted joined the faculty of UCLA in 1928 as an assistant professor of history and was promoted to full professor in 1951. From 1939 to 1945, Olmsted served as the faculty representative to the Pacific Coast Athletic Conference, acting as president of the conference in 1946. Olmsted also served as assistant to UCLA's Dean of Letters and Sciences, Gordon S. Watkins. When the University of California, Riverside created its College of Letters and Science in 1953, Olmsted was appointed by Watkins (UCR's first provost) as both a professor of history, the chairman of the humanities division, and the college's first faculty member. Olmsted was involved in many extracurricular activities. He was a member of the Pacific Coast Committee for the Humanities. He was a charter member of the Los Angeles chapter of Sigma Xi and he established the chapter of Phi Beta Kappa at UCR. Olmsted retired from teaching in 1970. Circa 2004 a new humanities building on the UCR campus, Olmsted Hall, was named in his honor.

== Publications ==
- Jean Picard et les débuts de l'astronomie de précision au XVIIe siècle: actes du colloque du tricentenaire (in French). Paris: Ed. du Centre national de la recherche scientifique. 1987. ISBN 9782222041047.
