= Englebright Lake =

- Harry L. Englebright Lake
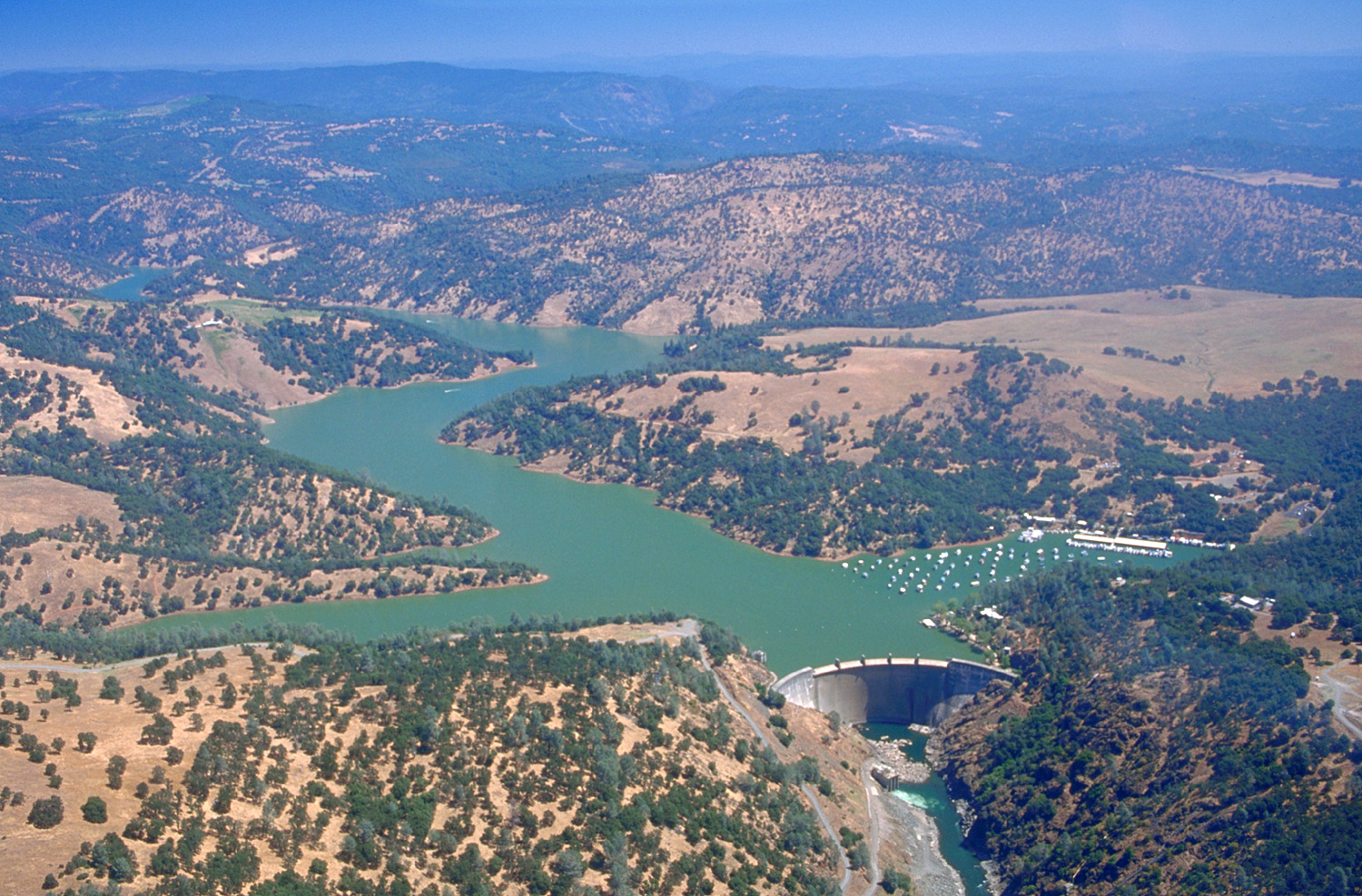
- Aerial view of dam and lake

- Location within California Location within the United States
- Location: Nevada County / Yuba County, California, United States
- Coordinates: 39°14′25″N 121°16′13″W
- Type: Reservoir
- Basin countries: United States
- Surface area: 815 acres (330 ha)

Englebright Lake is an 815-acre reservoir on the Yuba River, impounded by Englebright Dam, in the Sierra Nevada, Northern California, United States. The reservoir stores 45,000 acre feet of water with nearly 24 miles of shoreline.

It is located in Yuba County and Nevada County. The boat launch and marina, named Skippers Cove, are located in Smartsville. It is located in between Grass Valley and Marysville. The reservoir, as well as the dam, were named for former U.S. Representative Harry L. Englebright, who represented the district in which Englebright is located.

The California Office of Environmental Health Hazard Assessment (OEHHA) has developed a safe eating advisory for the Englebright Lake based on levels of mercury found in fish caught here.

== History ==
Englebright Lake was created in 1941, the year of completion of Englebright Dam. The reservoir is fed by the Yuba River. The upper reaches of the lake is home to the confluence of South Yuba River and the Yuba River. Upstream from Englebright is another reservoir: New Bullards Bar Reservoir. Several years after dam construction, two hydroelectric power plants were built downstream from the Englebright Dam that now supply power to 50,000 homes. Englebright Dam was constructed to store debris from upstream hydraulic mining operations. The dam is constructed from concrete and spans 1,142 feet across the river gorge and reaches 260 feet from the floor of the gorge. The dam, on which the gorge is located, is very steep and is known as the "narrows" due to the topography of the river canyon. The dam was built, and is owned and operated by the US Army Corps of Engineers. The USACE operates the boat launch nearest their lake headquarters right near the dam.

== Uses ==
=== Fishing ===
Englebright Lake offers a great opportunity of fishing from the marina to the upper reaches of the lake. The lake contains populations of rainbow trout, brown trout, largemouth bass, smallmouth bass Kokanee salmon, catfish, and multiple species of sunfish creating abundant opportunities for recreational fishermen to be successful on the water. Due to the past mining operations upstream, the mercury content in certain fish is high. The California Office of Environmental Health Hazard Assessment (OEHHA) has developed a safe eating advisory for the Englebright Lake based on levels of mercury found in fish caught here. These levels can be found on the OEHHA website as well as the freshwater fishing regulations brochure put out by the California Department of Fish and Wildlife. Through programs meant to increase fishing opportunities and fish numbers, Lake Englebright participates in a trout breeding program that uses pens that are then released into the lake to bolster the fishing opportunities.

=== Boating ===
Englebright Lake has two boat launches, a marina with multiple docks for houseboats, and 9 miles of lake for boating access. The lake attracts recreational boaters who come for day use, boat in camping, or to spend time on personal houseboats that are docked on the lake. Skippers Cove Marina offers rentals of houseboats, fishing boats, party boats, and ski boats allowing even those who do not own a vessel to boat on the waters of Englebright Lake.

=== Camping ===
Englebright Lake offers boat in campsites and day use and picnic areas. The campsites can only be accessed by boat and are available on a first-come, first-served basis. All campsites include restrooms, a fire grill, lantern hanger, and a level foundation for a tent. Camping can also be done on the lake through the use of houseboats, which can be personally owned and stored in the marina or rented from the marina.

=== Water Use ===
The 45,000 acre feet stored behind Englebright Dam has multiple uses outside of recreation. The water stored is used to generate hydroelectric power that powers 50,000 homes, water is diverted for agricultural uses, and cold water releases allow the conservation of the salmonid fisheries down on the lower Yuba River.

== See also ==
- List of dams and reservoirs in California
- Yuba River topics
