= Ølsted, Aarhus Municipality =

Village in Aarhus Municipality, Denmark

Coordinates: 56.233°N 10.137°E

Location of Ølsted in the Central Denmark Region
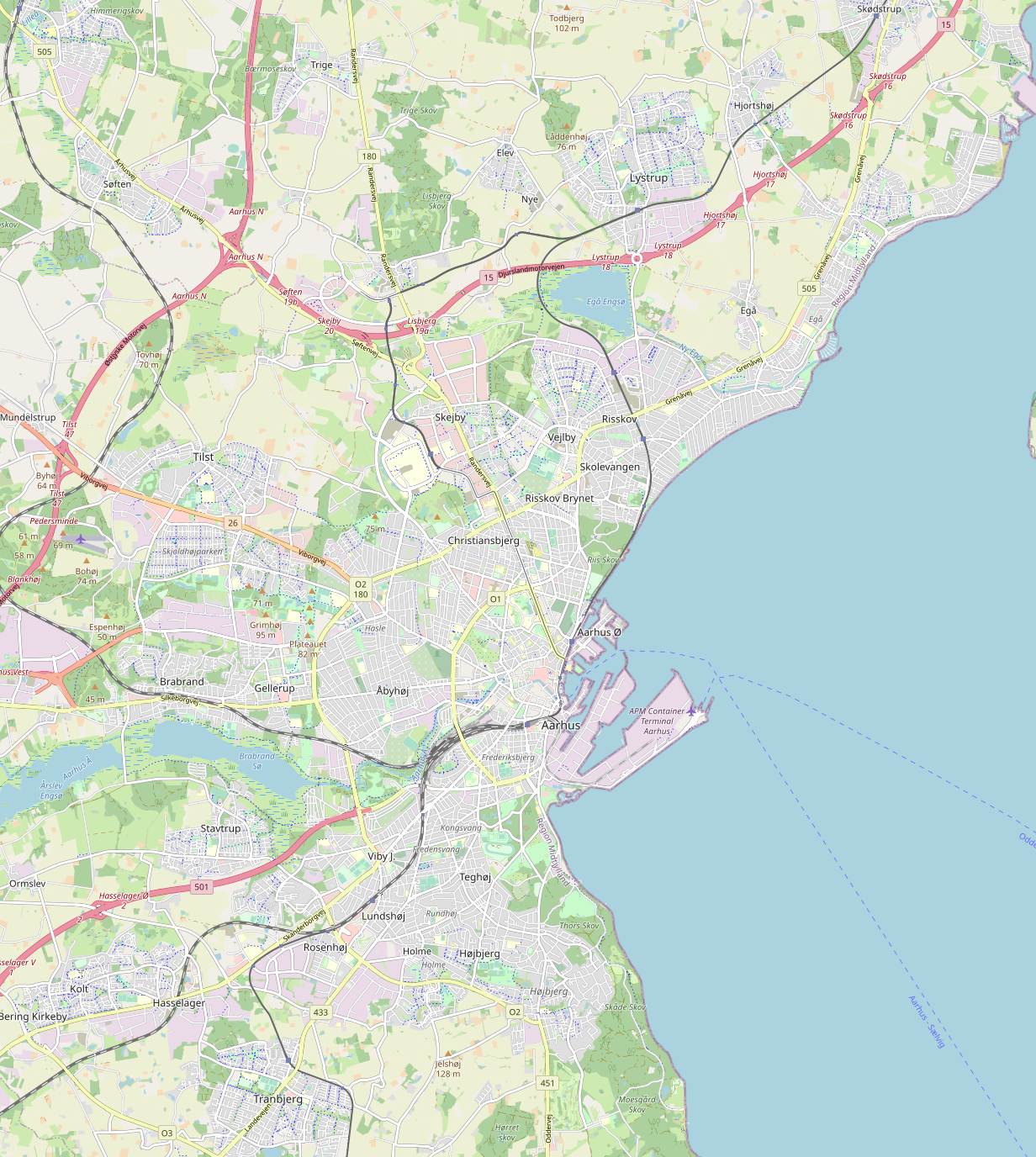
Location of Ølsted, north of Aarhus, Denmark

Ølsted is a small village in Aarhus Municipality, near the east coast of the Central Denmark Region, Denmark. It is located in a rural setting, 2 kilometres (1.2 mi) south of the town of Trige – near enough that they share a Trige-Ølsted Joint Council.

Ølsted is 4 kilometres (2.5 mi) east of the town of Søften, and 10 kilometres (6.2 mi) north of the city of Aarhus. Ølsted consists of a number of older houses and several farms, though its proximity to Aarhus has attracted some commuters, with the Trige-Ølsted Joint Council noting in 2020 that "in recent years more detached houses have been added."

The village has Ølsted Church. Students from Ølsted, up to grade 9, attend Bakkegårdsskolen in Trige.

The town has a common postal district (8380) with Trige and Spørring.

There may have been a manor house in the village during the 14th century, as Jens Peter Trap, in his seminal Statistical-Topographical Description of the Kingdom of Denmark (1904, 3rd edition, if not earlier editions), includes "Johannes Pedersen of Ølsted is mentioned in 1356".

== Gallery ==
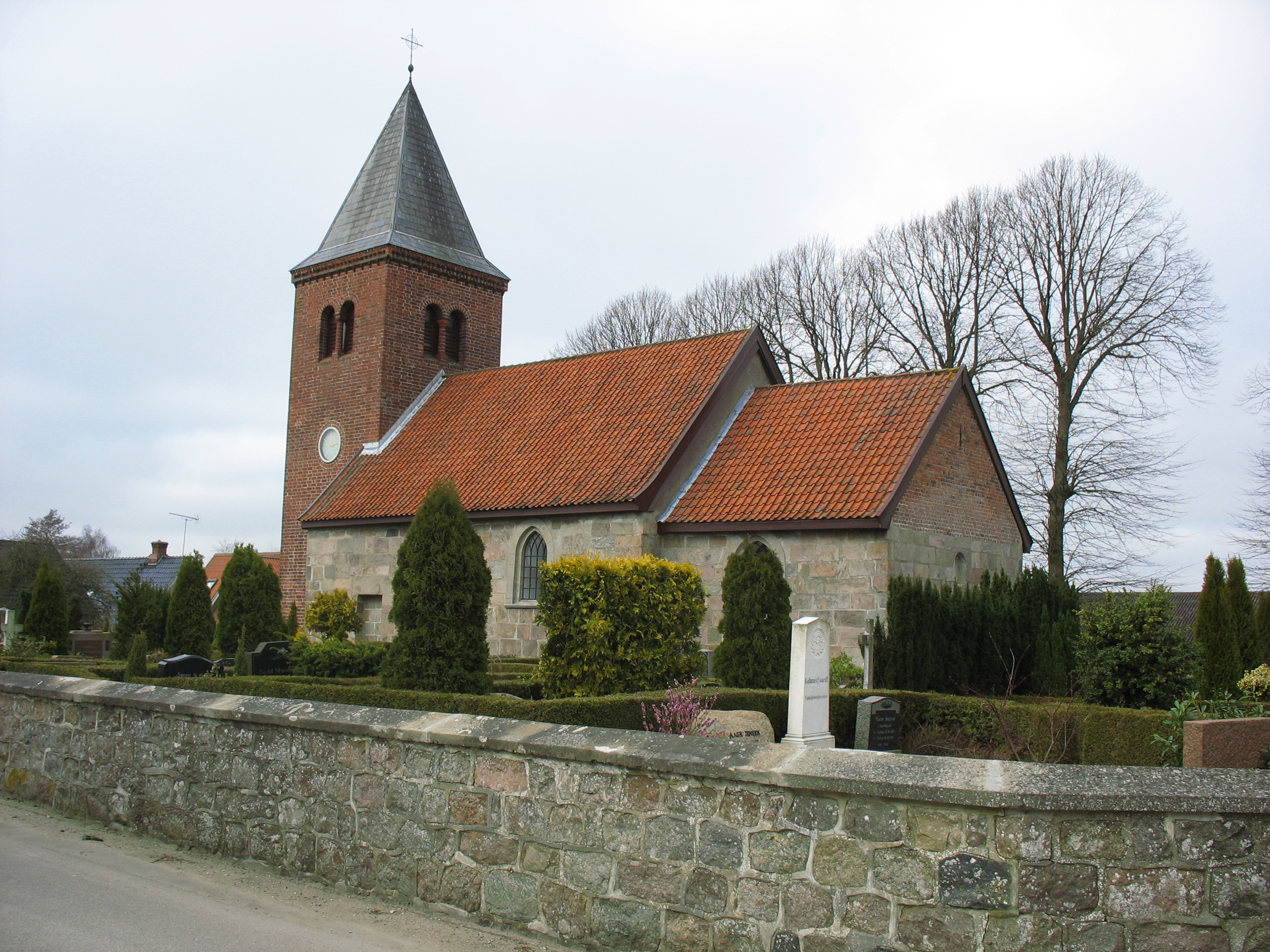
Ølsted Church

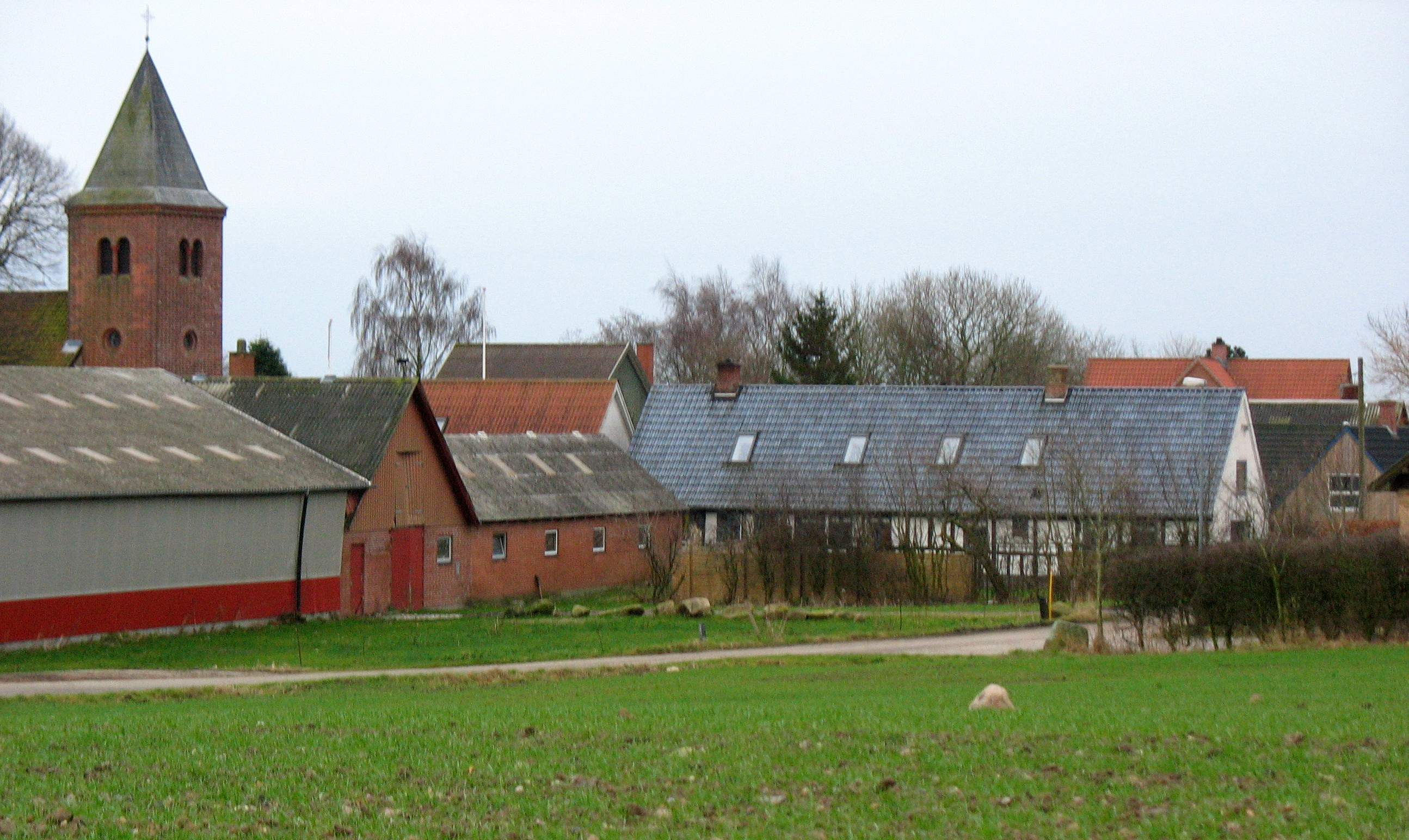
Ølsted
