= Bridgeport Covered Bridge =

Oldest covered bridge in California

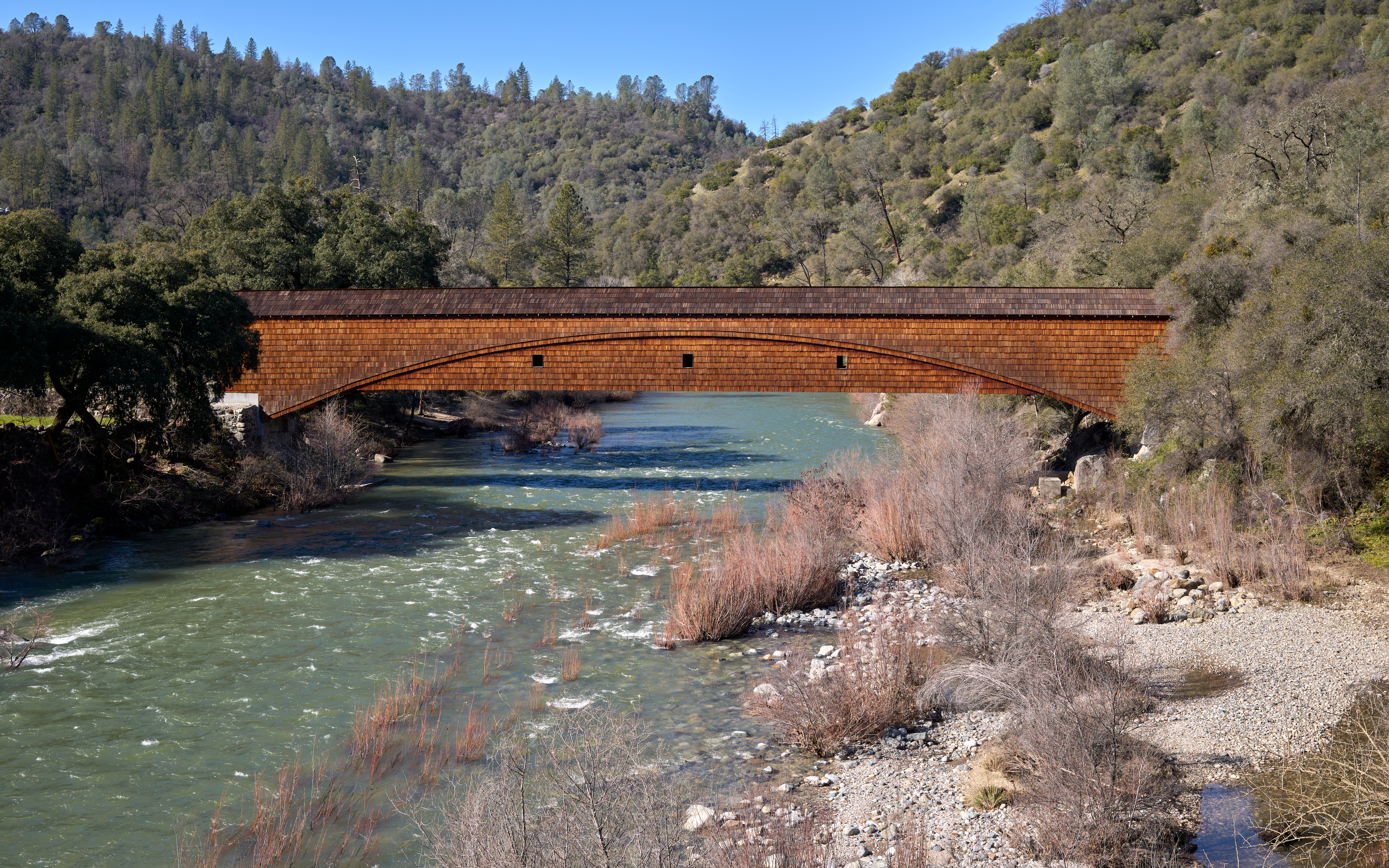
- View of the Bridgeport Covered Bridge, February 2025
- Coordinates: 39°17′33.86″N 121°11′41.66″W
- Carries: Pedestrian
- Crosses: South Yuba River
- Locale: Nevada County, California

Characteristics
- Design: Howe truss with auxiliary arch covered bridge
- Total length: 233 feet (71 m)
- Longest span: 208 feet (63 m)
- Load limit: 13 Tons (Current estimate at 3 tons due to age of timbers)

History
- Designer: David Ingefield Wood
- Opened: 1862
- Bridgeport Covered Bridge
- U.S. National Register of Historic Places
- California Historical Landmark
- Nearest city: French Corral, CA
- Built: 1862
- Architectural style: Howe truss with an auxiliary Burr Arch Truss
- NRHP reference No.: 71000168
- CHISL No.: 390
- Added to NRHP: July 14, 1971

Location
- Interactive map of Bridgeport Covered Bridge

The Bridgeport Covered Bridge is located in Bridgeport, Nevada County, California, southwest of French Corral and north of Lake Wildwood. It is used as a pedestrian crossing over the South Yuba River. The bridge was built in 1862 by David John Wood. Its lumber came from Plum Valley in Sierra County, California. The bridge was closed to vehicular traffic in 1972 and pedestrian traffic in 2011 due to deferred maintenance and "structural problems".

On June 20, 2014, California Gov. Jerry Brown signed budget legislation that included $1.3 million for the bridge's restoration. The work was slated to be done in two phases—near-term stabilization followed by restoration. The bridge reopened to pedestrians in November 2021 following completion of the restoration work.

The Bridgeport Covered Bridge has the longest clear single span of any surviving wooden covered bridge in the world.

== Historic landmark ==
The bridge is California Registered Historical Landmark No. 390, was designated as a National Historic Civil Engineering Landmark in 1970, and was listed in the National Register of Historic Places in 1971. There are four plaques at the site.

The State Historical Landmark plaque was placed in 1964. The landmark was rededicated in 2014. The inscription on the current plaque reads:

"Built in 1862 by David J. Wood with lumber from his mill in Sierra County. The covered bridge was part of the Virginia Turnpike Company toll road that served the northern mines and the Nevada Comstock Lode. The associated ranch and resources for rest and repair provided a necessary lifeline across the Sierra Nevada. Utilizing a unique combination truss and arch construction, Bridgeport Covered Bridge is one of the oldest housed spans in the western United States and the longest single span wooden covered bridge in the world."

The bridge was an important link in a freight-hauling route that stretched from the San Francisco Bay to Virginia City, Nevada and points beyond after the discovery of the Comstock Lode in 1859 sparked a mining boom in Nevada. Steamboats carried freight from the San Francisco Bay up the Sacramento River to Marysville, where it was loaded onto wagons for the trip across the Sierra Nevada via the Virginia Turnpike, and Henness Pass Road. The route across the bridge was ultimately eclipsed by the completion of the First transcontinental railroad as far as Reno in 1868 via Donner Pass, but it continued to serve nearby communities in the foothills until improved roads and bridges on other routes drew away most of the traffic.

== Longest span ==
A report by the U.S. Department of the Interior states that the Bridgeport Covered Bridge (HAER No. CA-41) has clear spans of 210 feet (64 m) on one side and 208 feet (63 m) on the other, while Old Blenheim Bridge (HAER No. NY-331) had a documented clear span of 210 feet (64 m) in the middle (1936 HABS drawings).

With the 2011 destruction of the Old Blenheim Bridge, the Bridgeport Covered Bridge is the undisputed longest-span wooden covered bridge still surviving. Historically, the longest single-span covered bridge on record was Pennsylvania's McCall's Ferry Bridge with a claimed clear span of 360 feet (110 m) (built 1814–15, destroyed by ice jam 1817).

== See also ==
- California Historical Landmarks in Nevada County
- List of bridges documented by the Historic American Engineering Record in California
- List of covered bridges in California
- National Register of Historic Places listings in Nevada County, California
