= National Register of Historic Places listings in Bath County, Virginia =

Location of Bath County in Virginia

This is a list of the National Register of Historic Places listings in Bath County, Virginia.

This is intended to be a complete list of the properties and districts on the National Register of Historic Places in Bath County, Virginia, United States. The locations of National Register properties and districts for which the latitude and longitude coordinates are included below, may be seen in an online map.

There are 27 properties and districts listed on the National Register in the county, including 1 National Historic Landmark.

This National Park Service list is complete through NPS recent listings posted October 2, 2026.

== Current listings ==
	Name on the Register	Image	Date listed	Location	City or town	Description
1	Ashwood School	Ashwood School	July 28, 2016 (#16000484)	5604 U.S. Route 220; 37°58′22″N 79°50′57″W	Hot Springs	
2	Bacova Historic District		October 6, 2026 (#100013502)	Jackson River Turnpike, Longview Drive, Lake View Drive, Riners Lane, Purkey Lane, Tidewater Lane, Post Office Drive; 38°03′14″N 79°50′48″W	Bacova	
3	Barton Lodge	Barton Lodge	December 24, 2013 (#13000984)	373 French's Hill Dr. 37°59′47″N 79°50′04″W	Hot Springs	
4	Camp Alkulana Historic District	Camp Alkulana Historic District	April 6, 2015 (#15000135)	111 Alkulana Camp Rd. 37°59′31″N 79°37′13″W	Millboro Springs	
5	Camp Mont Shenandoah Historic District	Camp Mont Shenandoah Historic District	April 6, 2015 (#15000136)	218 Mont Shenandoah Ln. 37°59′15″N 79°38′42″W	Millboro Springs	
6	Douthat State Park Historic District	Douthat State Park Historic District	September 20, 1986 (#86002183)	Douthat State Park Rd. 37°54′10″N 79°48′09″W	Millboro	
7	Fort Lewis	Fort Lewis	April 4, 2019 (#100003602)	603 Old Plantation Way; 38°06′58″N 79°36′44″W	Millboro	
8	Garth Newel	Garth Newel	June 19, 2013 (#13000402)	447 Garth Newel Ln. 38°01′27″N 79°47′53″W	Hot Springs	
9	Hidden Valley	Hidden Valley	February 26, 1970 (#70000784)	North of Bacova near the junction of State Route 39 and McGuffin Rd. in the George Washington National Forest; 38°06′22″N 79°48′52″W	Bacova	
10	Hidden Valley Rock Shelter (44BA31)	Hidden Valley Rock Shelter (44BA31)	July 22, 1986 (#86001945)	Northern side of the Jackson River, east of its confluence with Hidden Run; 38°06′20″N 79°48′32″W	Warm Springs	
11	Homestead Dairy Barns	Homestead Dairy Barns	February 13, 2007 (#07000051)	U.S. Route 220; 38°03′02″N 79°47′00″W	Warm Springs	
12	The Homestead	The Homestead	May 3, 1984 (#84003494)	U.S. Route 220; 37°59′49″N 79°49′50″W	Hot Springs	
13	Ingalls Field		March 9, 2026 (#100012791)	6240 Airport; 37°57′12″N 79°50′10″W	Hot Springs	
14	Millboro School	Millboro School	January 16, 2004 (#03001439)	Junction of High and Main Sts. 37°58′43″N 79°36′12″W	Millboro	
15	Mustoe House	Mustoe House	April 12, 2002 (#02000363)	U.S. Route 220; 37°55′17″N 79°53′27″W	Hot Springs	
16	Oakley Farm	Oakley Farm	August 8, 2007 (#07000803)	11865 U.S. Route 220; 38°02′36″N 79°47′23″W	Warm Springs	
17	Old Stone House	Old Stone House	February 10, 1983 (#83003262)	Southwest of Milboro Springs on Stilington Dr. 37°55′22″N 79°43′44″W	Millboro Springs	
18	Reveille		May 3, 2021 (#100006499)	437 Quarry Hill Dr. 38°00′11″N 79°49′05″W	Hot Springs	
19	Switchback School	Switchback School	December 24, 2013 (#13000985)	210 Pinehurst Heights Rd. 38°00′42″N 79°50′34″W	Hot Springs	
20	Three Hills	Three Hills	December 24, 2013 (#13000986)	348 Three Hills Ln. 38°02′44″N 79°46′57″W	Warm Springs	
21	T. C. Walker School	T. C. Walker School	August 25, 2020 (#100005532)	1633 TC Walker Rd. (Cty. Rd. 635); 37°59′53″N 79°35′33″W	Millboro vicinity	
22	Warm Springs and West Warm Springs Historic District	Warm Springs and West Warm Springs Historic District	September 25, 2018 (#100002991)	Junction of U.S. Route 220 and State Route 39, West Warm Springs Dr., and adjoining roads 38°02′46″N 79°47′22″W	Warm Springs	
23	Warm Springs Bathhouses	Warm Springs Bathhouses	October 8, 1969 (#69000222)	Northeast of Warm Springs off U.S. Route 220; 38°03′13″N 79°46′50″W	Warm Springs	Also known as Jefferson Pools; boundary increase approved August 20, 2019.
24	Warm Springs Mill	Warm Springs Mill	September 11, 1989 (#88001448)	Eastern side of Old Mill Rd. 38°02′53″N 79°47′24″W	Warm Springs	
25	John Wesley Methodist Episcopal Church and Cemetery	John Wesley Methodist Episcopal Church and Cemetery	December 24, 2013 (#13000987)	212 W. Warm Springs Dr. 38°03′34″N 79°48′23″W	West Warm Springs	
26	The Wilderness	The Wilderness	August 21, 2017 (#100001494)	13954 Deerfield Rd. 38°08′10″N 79°29′18″W	Hot Springs	
27	The Yard	The Yard	February 13, 2007 (#07000050)	381 Old Greenhouse Rd. 37°59′32″N 79°50′05″W	Hot Springs	

== See also ==
- List of National Historic Landmarks in Virginia
- National Register of Historic Places listings in Virginia
