= Virginia State Route 39 =

State highway in Virginia, United States

State Route 39

Route information
- Maintained by VDOT
- Length: 59.17 mi (95.22 km)
- Existed: 1940–present
- Tourist routes: Virginia Byway

Major junctions
- West end: WV 39 near Mountain Grove
- US 220 in Warm Springs; SR 42 in Goshen; SR 252 in Cedar Grove
- East end: US 11 in East Lexington

Location
- Country: United States
- State: Virginia
- Counties: Bath, Rockbridge

Highway system
- Virginia Routes; Interstate; US; Primary; Secondary; Byways; History; HOT lanes
← SR 38	→ SR 40

State Route 39 (SR 39) is a primary state highway in the U.S. state of Virginia. The state highway runs 59.17 miles (95.22 km) from the West Virginia state line near Mountain Grove, where the highway continues as West Virginia Route 39 (WV 39), east to U.S. Route 11 (US 11) in East Lexington. SR 39 connects Lexington with several communities formed around hot springs in Bath County. In Rockbridge County, the state highway passes through the town of Goshen and Goshen Pass, a gorge formed by the Maury River.

All of SR 39 is a Virginia Byway.

== Route description ==
SR 39 begins at Ryder Gap at the West Virginia state line, which also serves as the boundary between George Washington National Forest and Monongahela National Forest and between the James River and Monongahela River watersheds. The roadway continues west of the state line as WV 39 toward Minnehaha Springs and Marlinton. SR 39, which is named Mountain Valley Road, passes through a hairpin turn on its descent of the dividing ridge, then follows Big Turn Run to the valley of Little Back Creek, which passes by the hamlet of Mooretown. At Mountain Grove, the state highway turns south to follow Back Creek through a gap in Back Creek Mountain. SR 39 ascends the east side of the mountain along O'Rourke Draft, then descends to the Jackson River. The state highway continues east along Warm Springs Run through a gap in Little Mountain to the village of Warm Springs. SR 39 has a short concurrency with US 220 (Ingalls Boulevard) north of the village in which the highways pass the Jefferson Pools.

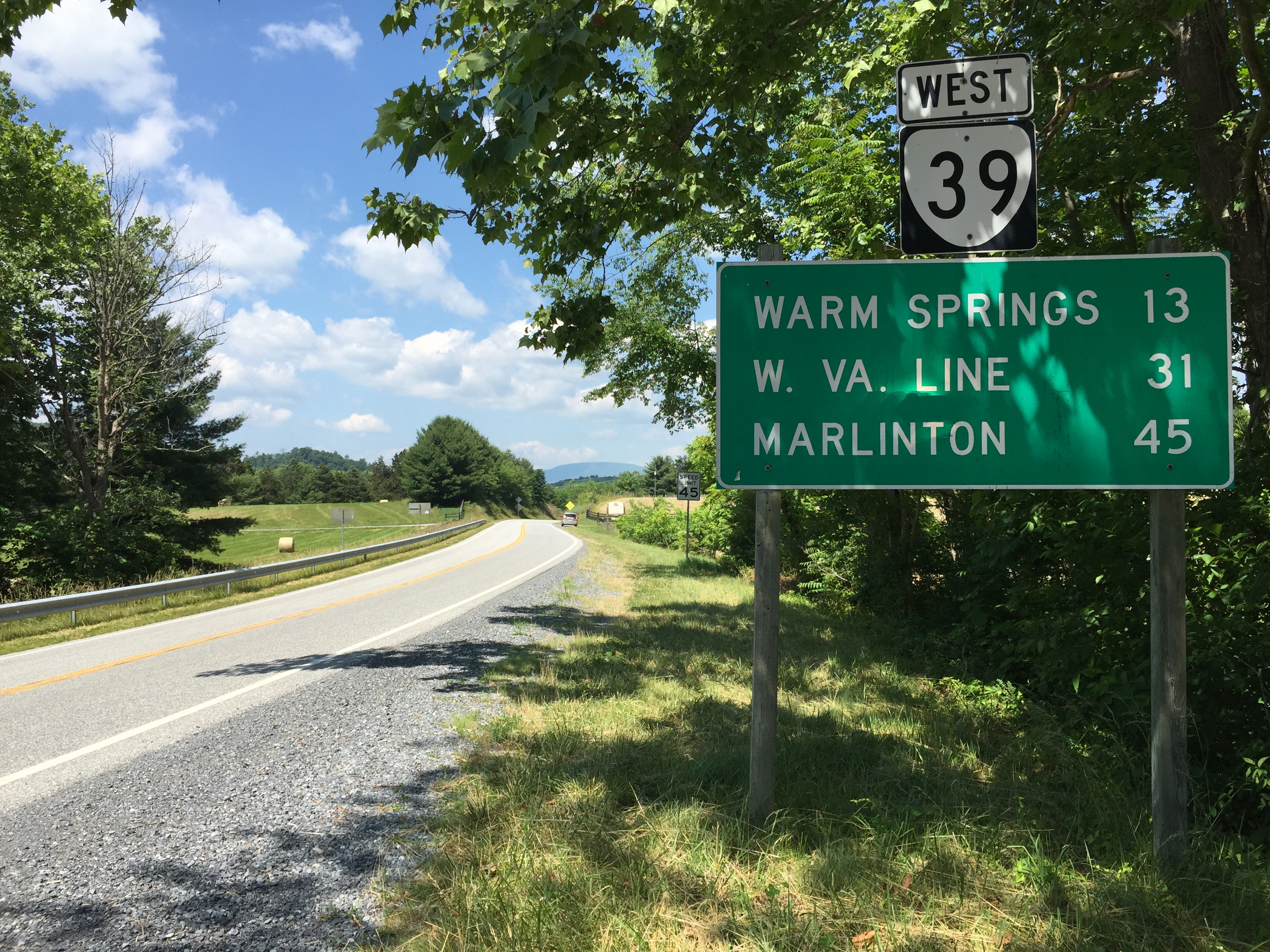
View west along SR 39 at SR 42 in Millboro Springs

SR 39 ascends Warm Springs Mountain and passes around the edge of Big Piney Mountain, then follows Jordan Creek and Thompson Creek past Bath Alum, the site of an airport, and McClung. The state highway follows the Cowpasture River to Millboro Springs, where the highway begins to run concurrently with SR 42 (Cow Pasture River Road). SR 39 and SR 42 leave the Cowpasture River and enter the valley of Mill Creek, which the highways and a CSX rail line follow through the gap in Mill Mountain at which they enter Rockbridge County and the town of Goshen and continue as Maury River Road. Just north of the center of town, SR 39 Alternate splits to the south as Main Street. SR 42 (Virginia Avenue) splits to the north immediately before SR 39 passes under another rail line and crosses Mill Creek just above its confluence with the Calfpasture River. SR 39 meets the first rail line at grade immediately before receiving the eastern end of SR 39 Alternate (Main Street).

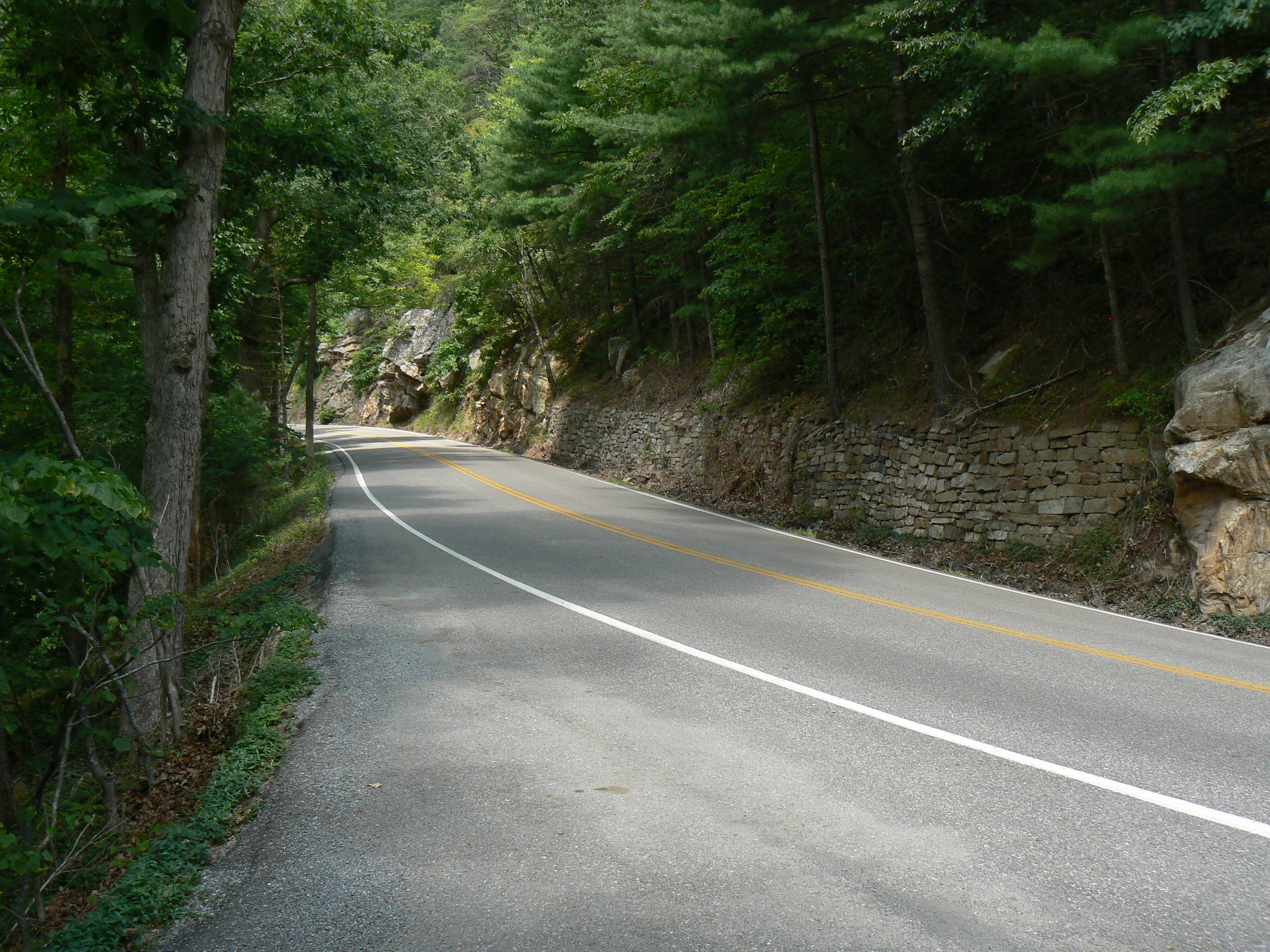
SR 39 as it heads east into Goshen Pass

South of Goshen, SR 39 leaves the rail line after an at-grade crossing and follows the Calfpasture River through a gap between Bratton Mountain and Knob Mountain and passes to the south of Lake Merriweather, an impoundment of the Little Calfpasture River. The two Calfpasture rivers merge to form the Maury River. SR 39 passes through Goshen Pass, a gorge formed by the Maury River through Great North Mountain that is preserved in the Goshen Pass Natural Area Preserve. East of the gorge, the state highway crosses to the north side of the river and passes through Rockbridge Baths. SR 39 leaves the immediate vicinity of the river and meets the southern end of SR 252 (Brownsburg Turnpike) at Cedar Grove. The state highway veers south along a curvaceous path toward East Lexington. SR 39 briefly parallels Interstate 64 (I-64) before reaching its eastern terminus at US 11 (Lee Highway). US 11 has an interchange with I-64 immediately to the south, which also leads to I-81 a short distance to the east.

== SR 39 Alternate ==
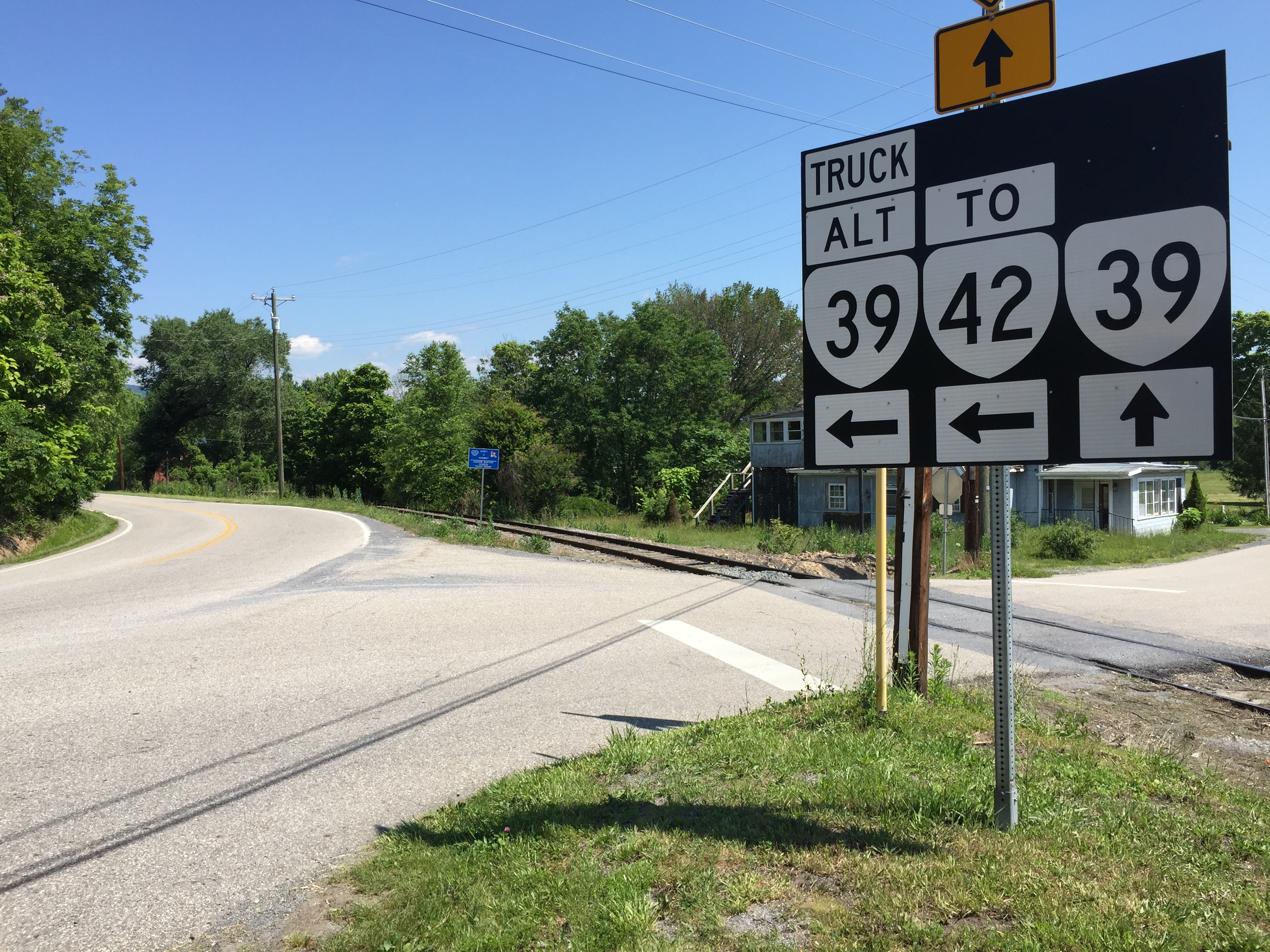
SR 39 Alt. westbound at SR 39 in Goshen

State Route 39 Alternate
- Location: Goshen
- Length: 0.35 mi (560 m)

SR 39 Alternate (SR 39 Alt.) is a 0.35-mile-long (0.56 km) alternate route serving as a shortcut for through traffic on SR 39 in the town of Goshen. The route serves as a truck route for SR 39 as bridge with a low clearance on the main route. The name of the road throughout the entire route is Main Street. SR 39 Alt. begins at the intersection of Main Street and Virginia Avenue (SR 39 and SR 42) and heads south. Immediately, it crosses over the Mill Creek and has a grade crossing with a railroad. After the railroad crossing, Main Street sharply curves to the east to parallel the railroad. The route ends shortly thereafter at a T-intersection with Maury River Road (SR 39).

== Major intersections ==
County	Location	mi	km	Destinations	Notes
Ryder Gap		0.00	0.00	WV 39 west – Marlinton	West Virginia state line; western terminus
Bath				SR 687 (Jackson River Turnpike) – Bacova	former SR 268 south
Bath	Warm Springs	17.81	28.66	US 220 south (Sam Snead Highway) – Covington	Western end of US 220 concurrency
Bath	Warm Springs	18.00	28.97	US 220 north (Sam Snead Highway) – Monterey	Eastern end of US 220 concurrency
Bath				SR 678 (Indian Draft) – Williamsville, Coursey Springs State Fish Hatchery	former SR 269 north
Bath	Millboro Springs	31.05	49.97	SR 42 south (Cowpasture River Highway) – Clifton Forge	Western end of SR 42 concurrency
Rockbridge	Goshen			SR 39 Alt. east (Main Street) – Lexington	Western end of SR 39 Alt.
Rockbridge	Goshen	39.25	63.17	SR 42 north (Virginia Avenue) – Craigsville, Harrisonburg	Eastern end of SR 42 concurrency
Rockbridge	Goshen			SR 39 Alt. west (Main Street) to SR 42	Eastern terminus of SR 39 Alt.
Rockbridge				SR 780 (Brattons Run) to I-64	former SR 270 south
Rockbridge	Cedar Grove	51.62	83.07	SR 252 north (Brownsburg Turnpike) – Staunton	Southern terminus of SR 252
Rockbridge	East Lexington	59.17	95.22	US 11 (North Lee Highway) – Fairfield, Lexington	Eastern terminus
1.000 mi = 1.609 km; 1.000 km = 0.621 mi: Concurrency terminus

< SR 337	Spurs of SR 33; 1923–1928	SR 339 >
< SR 803	District 8 State Routes; 1928–1933	SR 806 >
