= Ashwood School =

Ashwood School may refer to:

- Ashwood High School, public high school in Ashwood, Victoria
- Ashwood School, Melbourne, specialist school in Ashwood, Victoria
- Ashwood School, Virginia, historic school building in Hot Springs, Virginia
