= Hidden Valley (Bacova, Virginia) =

Historic house in Virginia, United States

- U.S. National Register of Historic Places
- Virginia Landmarks Register
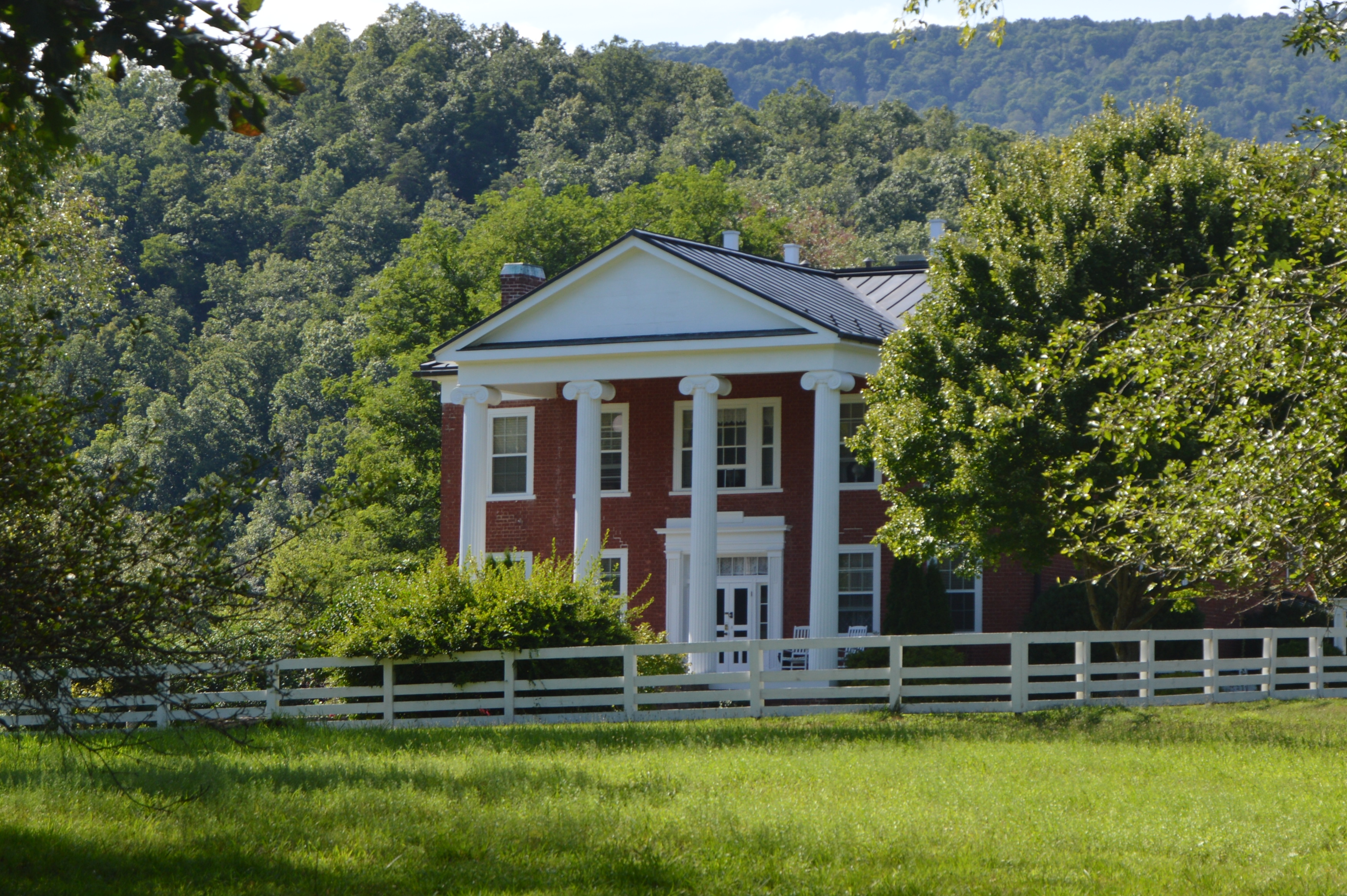
- Front of the house

- Location within Virginia Location within the United States
- Location: N of Bacova near jct. of Rtes. 621 and 39 in George Washington National Forest, near Bacova, Virginia
- Coordinates: 38°06′23″N 79°48′53″W
- Area: 280 acres (110 ha)
- Built: 1858
- Architectural style: Late Victorian, Greek Revival
- NRHP reference No.: 70000784
- VLR No.: 008-0004

Significant dates
- Added to NRHP: February 26, 1970
- Designated VLR: December 2, 1969

Hidden Valley, also known as Warwickton, is a historic home located near Bacova, Bath County, Virginia. It was built in 1858, and is a two-story, five-bay, brick structure with a hipped roof in a Greek Revival / Late Victorian style. It has a rear ell. The front facade features a pedimented tetra-style portico with Ionic order columns, placed over the central three bays of the five-bay facade. The entrance is styled upon a design on Plate 28 in Asher Benjamin's stylebook, The Practical Carpenter (1835).

It was listed on the National Register of Historic Places in 1970.
