= Camp Alkulana =

- Camp Alkulana Historic District
- U.S. National Register of Historic Places
- U.S. Historic district
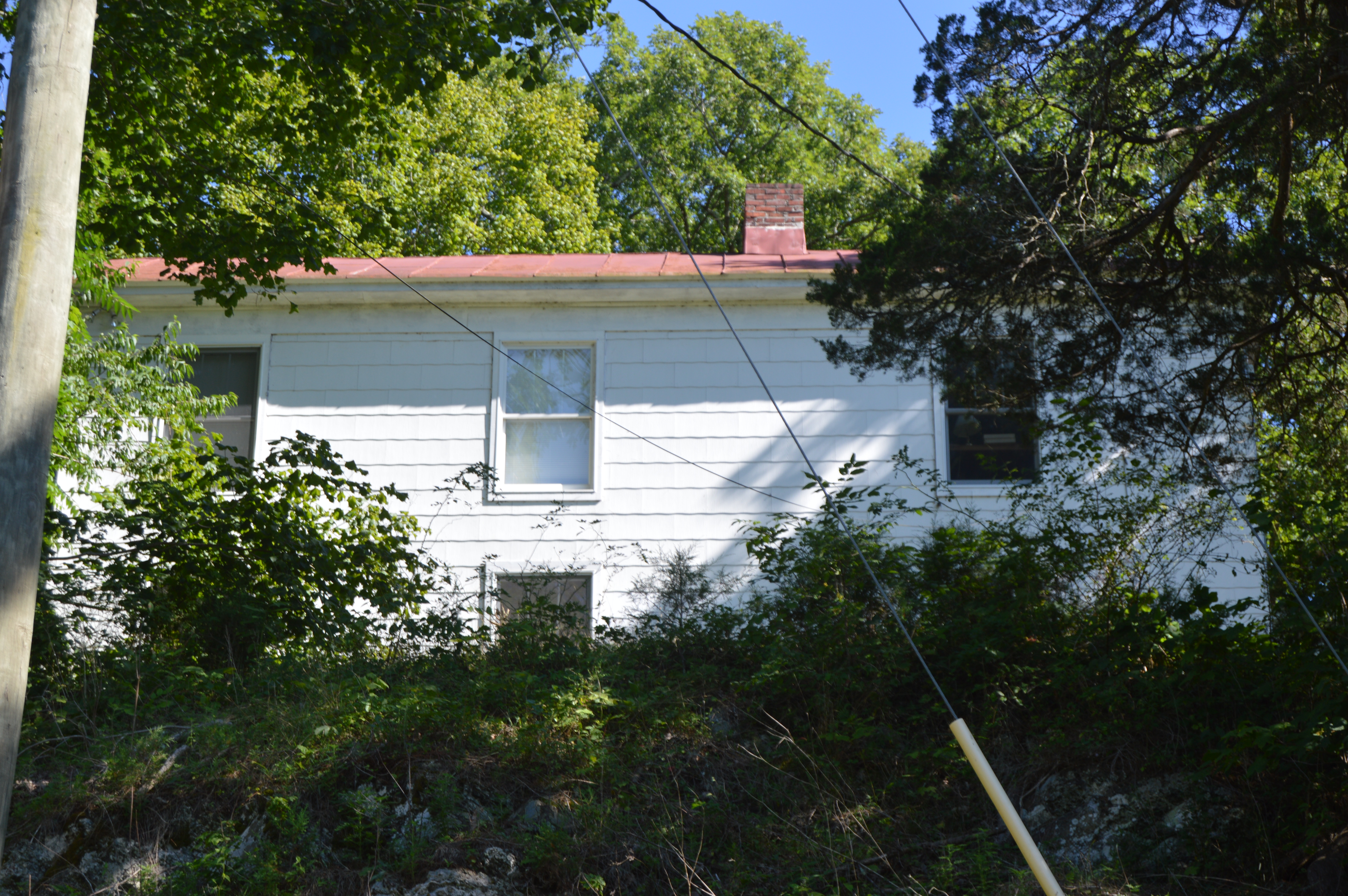
- Lantern Lodge, on the road near the entrance

- Location within Virginia Location within the United States
- Location: 111 Alkulana Camp Rd., near Millboro Springs, Virginia
- Coordinates: 37°59′32″N 79°37′11″W
- Area: 20 acres (8.1 ha)
- Built: 1917
- NRHP reference No.: 15000135
- Added to NRHP: April 6, 2015

Camp Alkulana is a summer camp in Millboro Springs, Virginia. Located on 20 acres (8.1 ha) in the mountains of western Virginia, it was established in 1915 and moved to its current site in 1917. It was founded to serve as a summer retreat for urban youth. It is the oldest known surviving summer camp in the state and it continues to specifically cater to low income children who would otherwise be unable to afford camp. Its buildings and grounds are mainly in a rustic style befitting the environment. The camp was listed on the National Register of Historic Places in 2015.

== See also ==
- National Register of Historic Places listings in Bath County, Virginia
