= Mooretown =

Mooretown may refer to:

Canada

- Mooretown, Ontario

Ireland

- Mooretown, County Westmeath, a townland in the barony of Delvin

Jamaica

- Moore Town, Jamaica

United States

- Feather Falls, California, formerly Mooretown
- Mooretown, Shreveport, Louisiana
- Mooretown, Virginia
- Mooretown Rancheria of Maidu Indians

== See also ==
- Mooreton, North Dakota
