= Thomastown =

Thomastown may refer to:

== Places ==
=== Australia ===
- Thomastown, Victoria, a suburb of Melbourne, Australia
- Thomastown railway station, Melbourne
- Electoral district of Thomastown, electorate in Victoria, Australia
- Thomastown Province, electorate in Victoria, Australia, abolished in 1988

=== Ireland (island of) ===
==== County Kilkenny ====
- Thomastown, County Kilkenny, a town
  - Thomastown railway station
- Thomastown (Parliament of Ireland constituency)

==== Townlands ====
There are many townlands of this name throughout the island of Ireland. (Some counties have more than one.) See:

- List of townlands of County Clare
- List of townlands of County Down § T
- List of townlands of County Dublin
- List of townlands of County Fermanagh § T
- List of townlands of County Kildare
- List of townlands of County Limerick
- List of townlands of County Louth
- List of townlands of County Mayo
- List of townlands of County Meath
- List of townlands of County Offaly
- List of townlands of County Tipperary
- List of townlands of County Westmeath
- List of townlands of County Wicklow

==== Other things in Ireland ====
- Thomastown Castle, County Tipperary, seat of Earl Landaff
- Thomastown, County Kildare, a civil parish in County Kildare, Ireland

=== United States ===
- Thomastown, Louisiana, in Madison Parish
- Thomastown Township, Wadena County, Minnesota, a township
- Thomastown, Mississippi, an unincorporated community
- Thomastown, Virginia, an unincorporated community

=== Wales ===
- Thomastown, Rhondda Cynon Taf, a village in Wales

== Sports teams ==
- Thomastown GAA, Gaelic Athletic Association club at Thomastown, Kilkenny, Ireland
- Thomastown Football Club, Australian rules football club at Thomastown, Melbourne, Australis

== See also ==
- Thomas Town (fl. 1420), MP for Kent, England
- Thomaston (disambiguation)
