= The Wilderness (Deerfield, Virginia) =

Historic house in Virginia, United States

- U.S. National Register of Historic Places
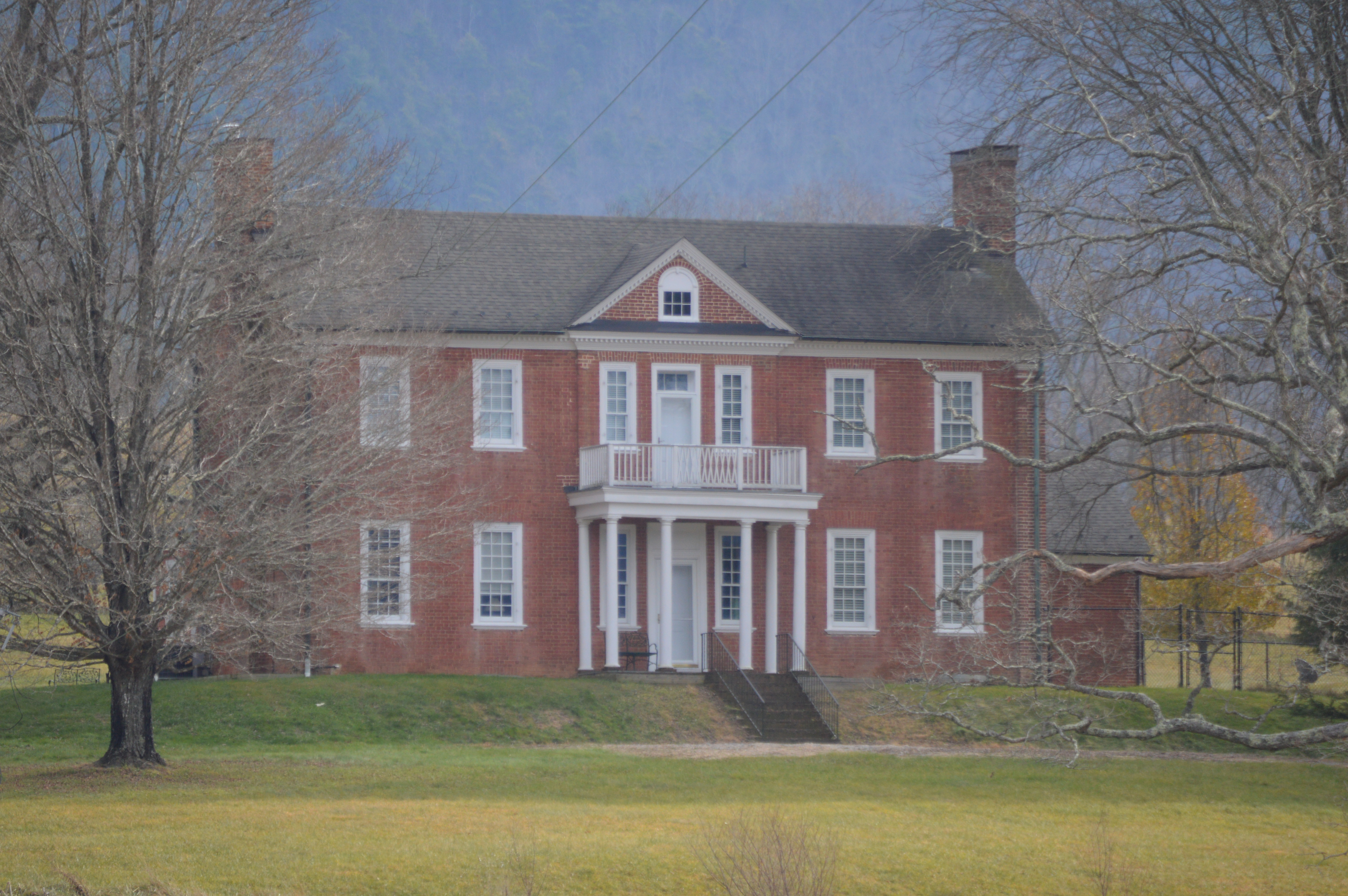
- Roadside view of the house

- Location within Virginia Location within the United States
- Location: 13954 Deerfield Rd., southwest of Deerfield, Virginia
- Coordinates: 38°8′10″N 79°29′18″W
- Area: 1,003 acres (406 ha)
- Built: 1816
- Architectural style: Georgian
- NRHP reference No.: 100001494
- Added to NRHP: August 21, 2017

The Wilderness is a historic estate at 13954 Deerfield Road in rural Bath County, Virginia, United States. It consists of more than 1,000 acres (400 ha) of rolling fields and woodlands, most of which lie southeast of Deerfield Road in the northeastern part of the county. In 1771, the Crown conveyed the land to brothers Sampson Mathews and George Mathews. The main house, a seven-bay brick Georgian structure, was built about 1816 for Samuel Blackburn, a prominent local farmer and politician, who was son-in-law to George Mathews. The property also includes a brick carriage house from the same period, a rarity in such a remote rural setting.

The property was listed on the National Register of Historic Places in 2017.

== See also ==
- National Register of Historic Places listings in Bath County, Virginia
