= Camp Mont Shenandoah =

- Camp Mont Shenandoah Historic District
- U.S. National Register of Historic Places
- U.S. Historic district
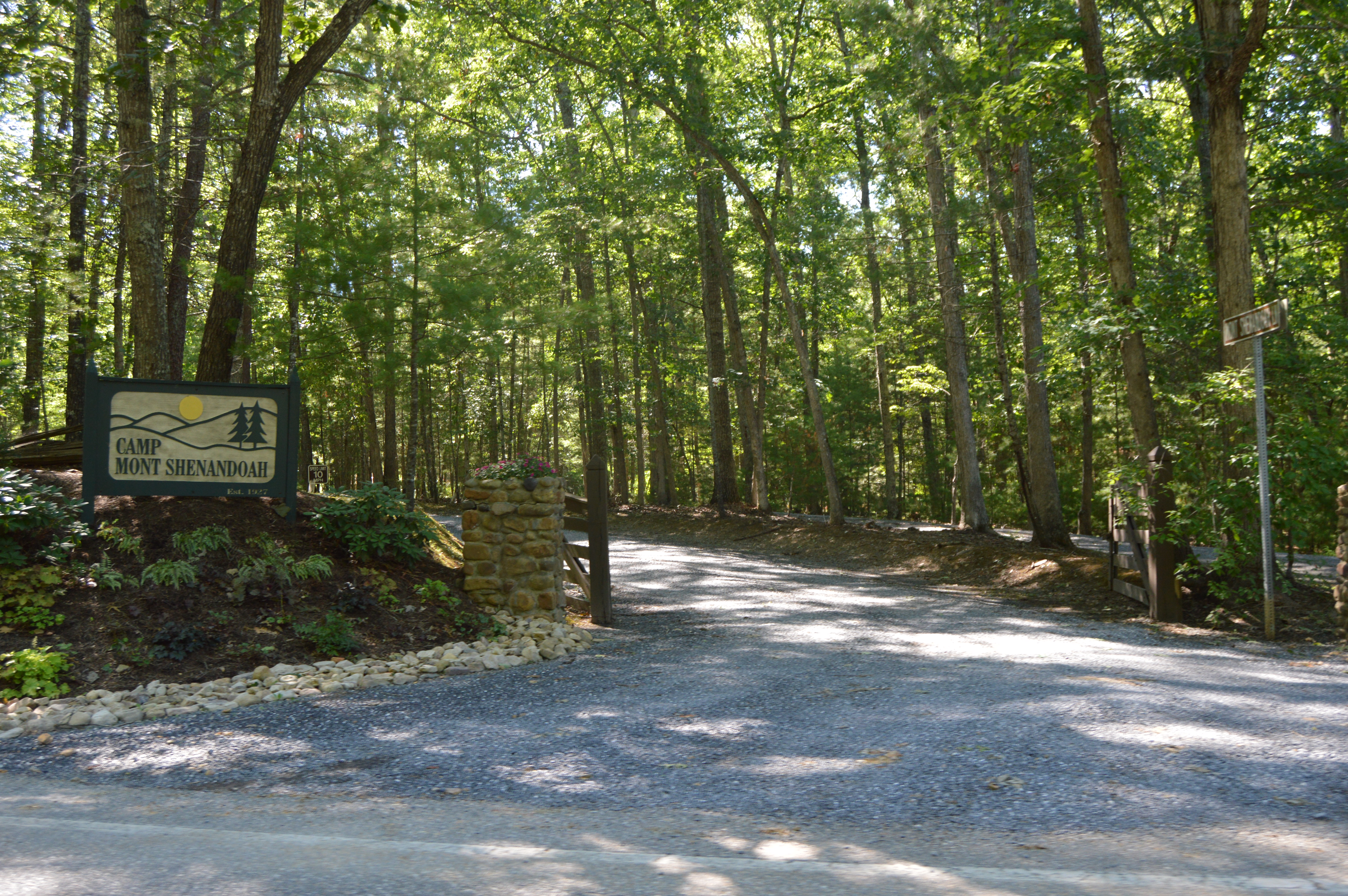
- Entrance from State Route 42

- Location within Virginia Location within the United States
- Location: 218 Mont Shenandoah Ln., near Millboro Springs, Virginia
- Coordinates: 37°59′13″N 79°38′44″W
- Area: 60 acres (24 ha)
- Built: 1927
- NRHP reference No.: 15000136
- Added to NRHP: April 6, 2015

Camp Mont Shenandoah is an all-girls summer camp near Millboro Springs, Virginia. Located on 60 acres (24 ha) in the Allegheny Mountains of western Virginia, it was established in 1927, and is one of the oldest continuously-operating summer camps in the state. Its buildings and grounds are mainly in a rustic style befitting the environment. In addition to residential cabins, it has a lodge and dining hall. Activities supported include tennis, basketball, canoeing on the Cowpasture River, and archery, as well as arts and crafts. The camp was listed on the National Register of Historic Places in 2015.

== See also ==
- National Register of Historic Places listings in Bath County, Virginia
