= Crowdertown, Virginia =

Unincorporated community in Virginia, US

Coordinates: 38°00′33″N 79°51′03″W

Crowdertown is an unincorporated community in Bath County, Virginia, United States.
