= John Wesley Methodist Episcopal Church and Cemetery =

Historic site in Bath County, Virginia, US

- U.S. National Register of Historic Places
- Virginia Landmarks Register
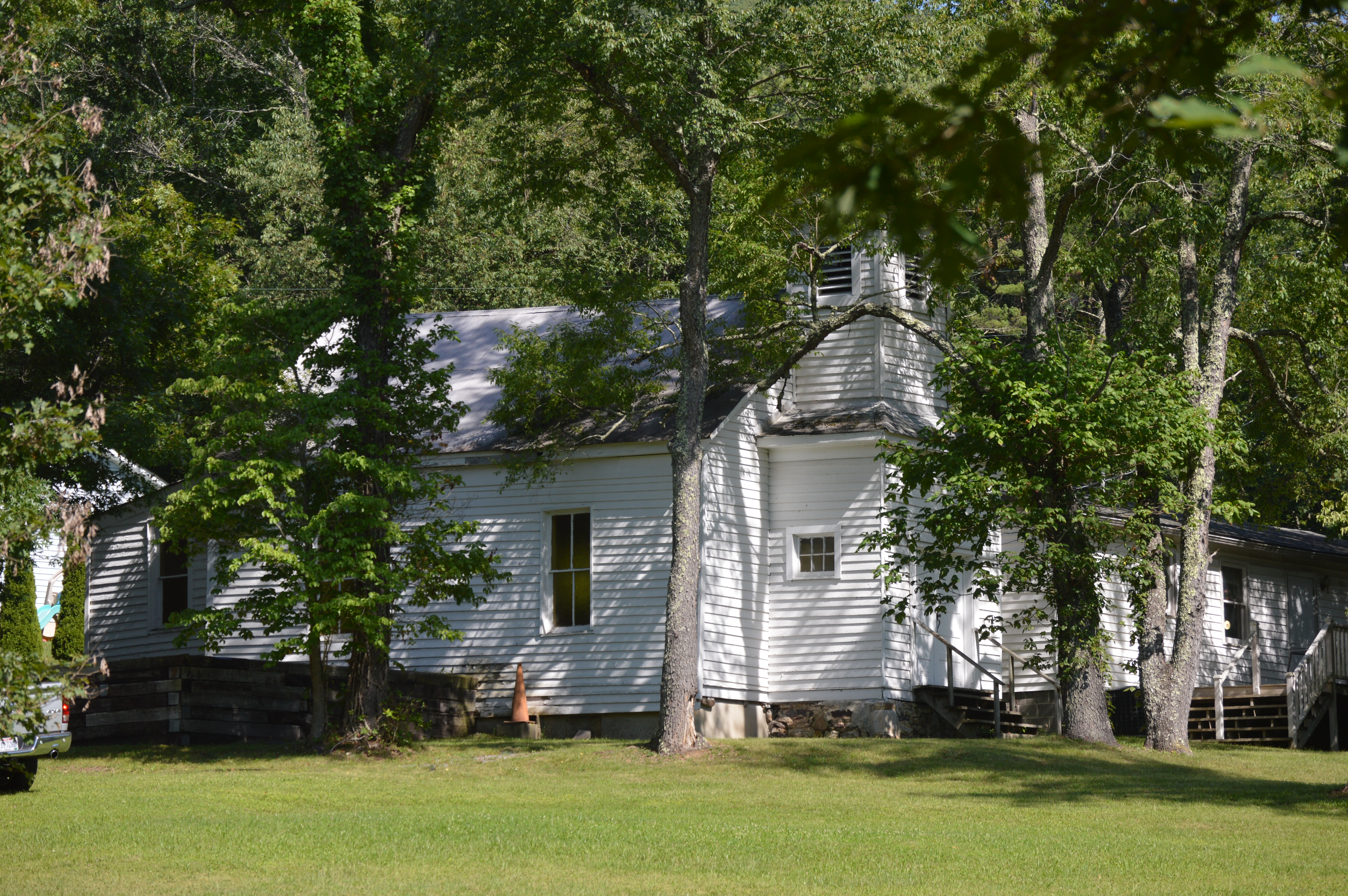
- Northwestern side and front

- Location within Virginia Location within the United States
- Location: 212 W. Warm Springs Drive at West Warm Springs, Virginia
- Coordinates: 38°03′34″N 79°48′21″W
- Area: 3 acres (1.2 ha)
- Built: 1873, 1923, 1982
- NRHP reference No.: 13000987
- VLR No.: 008-5030

Significant dates
- Added to NRHP: December 24, 2013
- Designated VLR: September 19, 2013

John Wesley Methodist Episcopal Church and Cemetery, also known as John Wesley United Methodist Church and Wesley Chapel, is a historic Methodist Episcopal church and cemetery located at West Warm Springs, Bath County, Virginia. It was built by former slaves in 1873, and is a one-story, front-gabled, log church, clad in weatherboard with a stone foundation. A frame vestibule with bell tower was added to the front of the church and a choir loft rear extension was added in 1923. In 1982 a one-story, frame Sunday School addition, clad in vinyl siding was built by volunteers and added to the southeast elevation. The church represents the lone built representation of the first decades of the African-American settlement at West Warm Springs.

It was added to the National Register of Historic Places in 2013.
