= Warm Springs Mill =

- U.S. National Register of Historic Places
- U.S. Historic district
- Virginia Landmarks Register
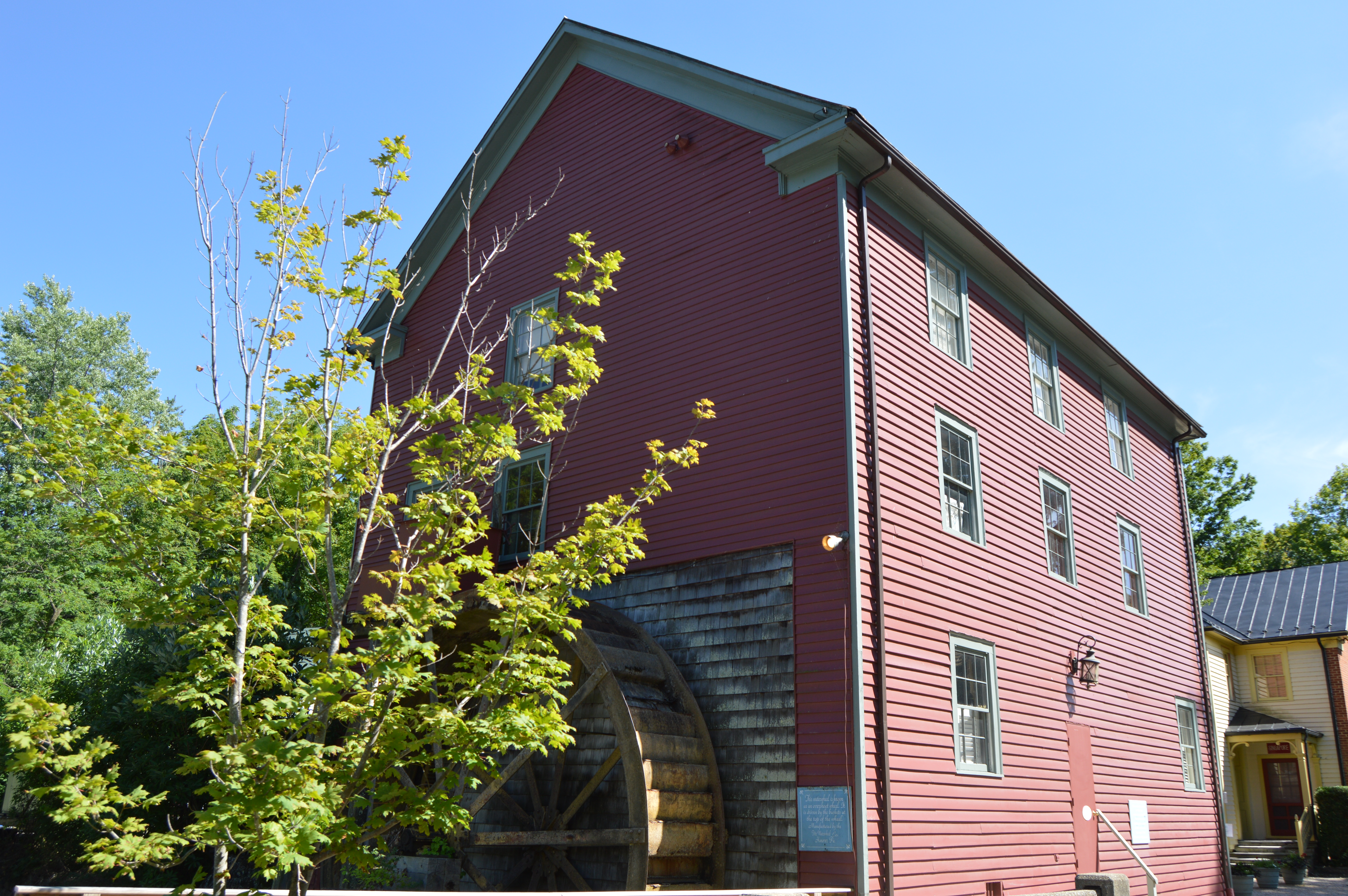
- Northern and western sides

- Location within Virginia Location within the United States
- Location: E side of VA 645, Warm Springs, Virginia
- Coordinates: 38°2′51″N 79°47′25″W
- Area: 0.5 acres (0.20 ha)
- Built: 1771
- Built by: W.H. Miller
- NRHP reference No.: 88001448
- VLR No.: 008-0022

Significant dates
- Added to NRHP: September 11, 1989
- Designated VLR: February 16, 1988

Warm Springs Mill, also known as Miller Mill and Inn at Gristmill Square, is a historic grist mill complex and national historic district located at Warm Springs, Bath County, Virginia. It was built in 1901, and is a three-story, gable-roofed frame building, with an iron overshot Fitz water wheel with the original mill race. The mill remained in operation until 1971, after which it was renovated for use as a restaurant and bed and breakfast.

It was listed on the National Register of Historic Places in 1989.
