= Armstrong, Virginia =

Human settlement in Virginia, United States of America

Coordinates: 38°06′43″N 79°31′17″W

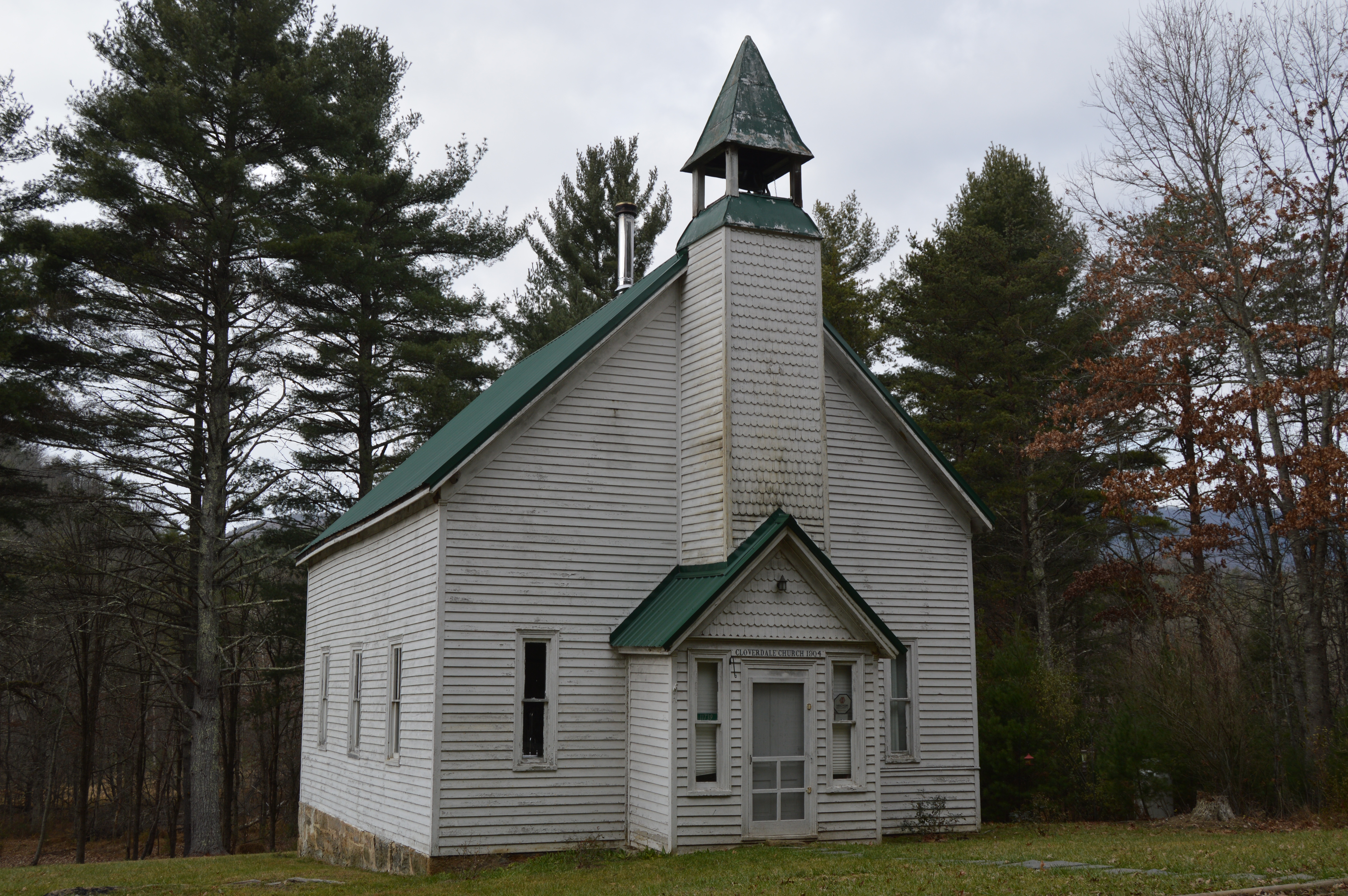
Presbyterian church

Armstrong is an unincorporated community in Bath County, Virginia, United States.
