= Healing Springs, Virginia =

Unincorporated community in Virginia, US

Coordinates: 37°57′39″N 79°51′45″W

Healing Springs is an unincorporated community in Bath County, Virginia, United States.

== History ==
Healing Springs takes its name from the hot springs found nearby.
