= Tinkertown, Virginia =

Unincorporated community in Virginia, US

Coordinates: 37°56′29″N 79°52′28″W

Tinkertown is an unincorporated community in Bath County, Virginia, United States.
