= Green Valley, Virginia =

Human settlement in United States of America

Coordinates: 38.08040°N 79.59921°W

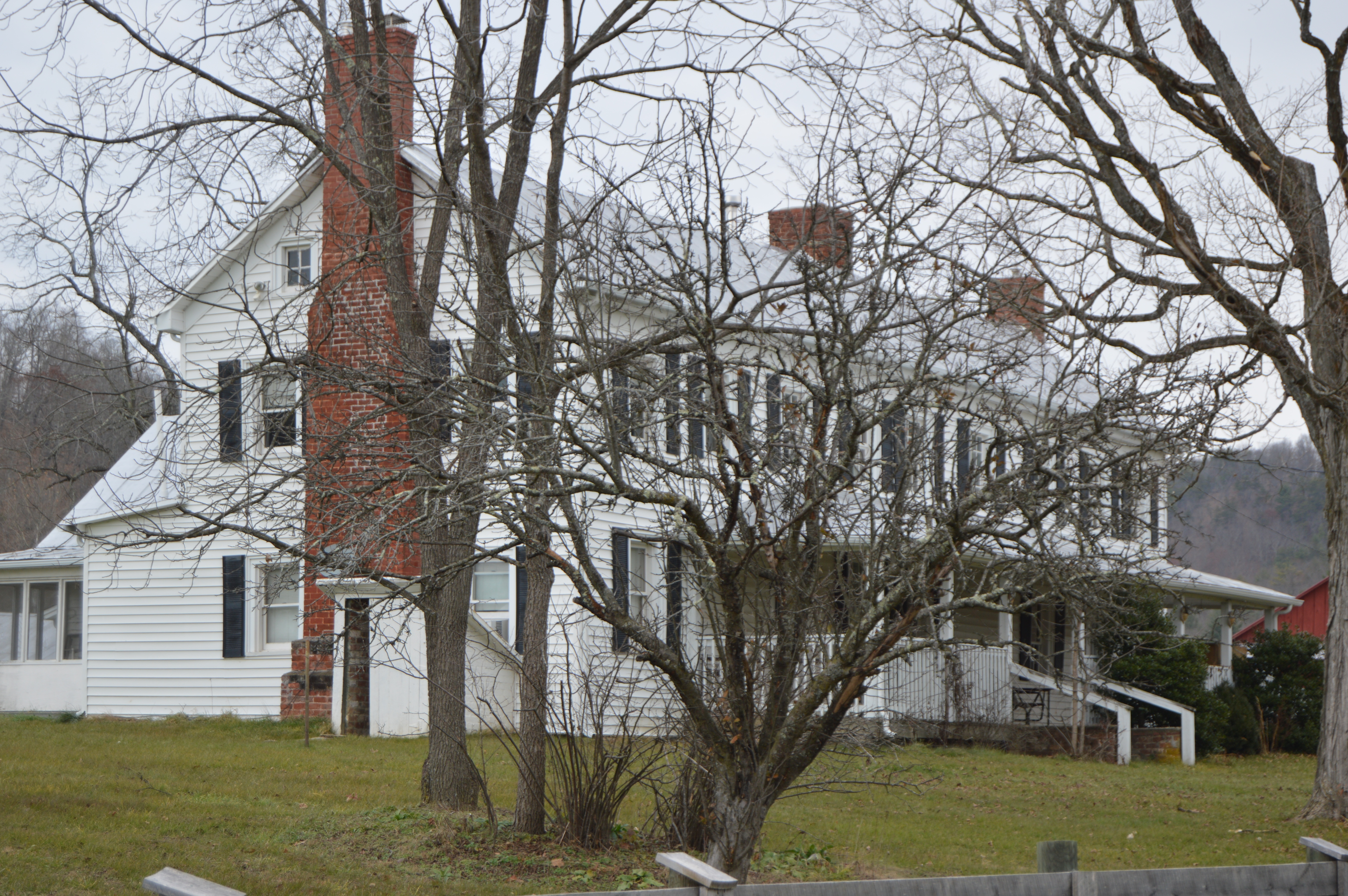
Former tavern

Green Valley is an unincorporated community in Bath County, Virginia, United States.
