= Carloover, Virginia =

Unincorporated community in Virginia, US

Coordinates: 37°55′27″N 79°53′19″W

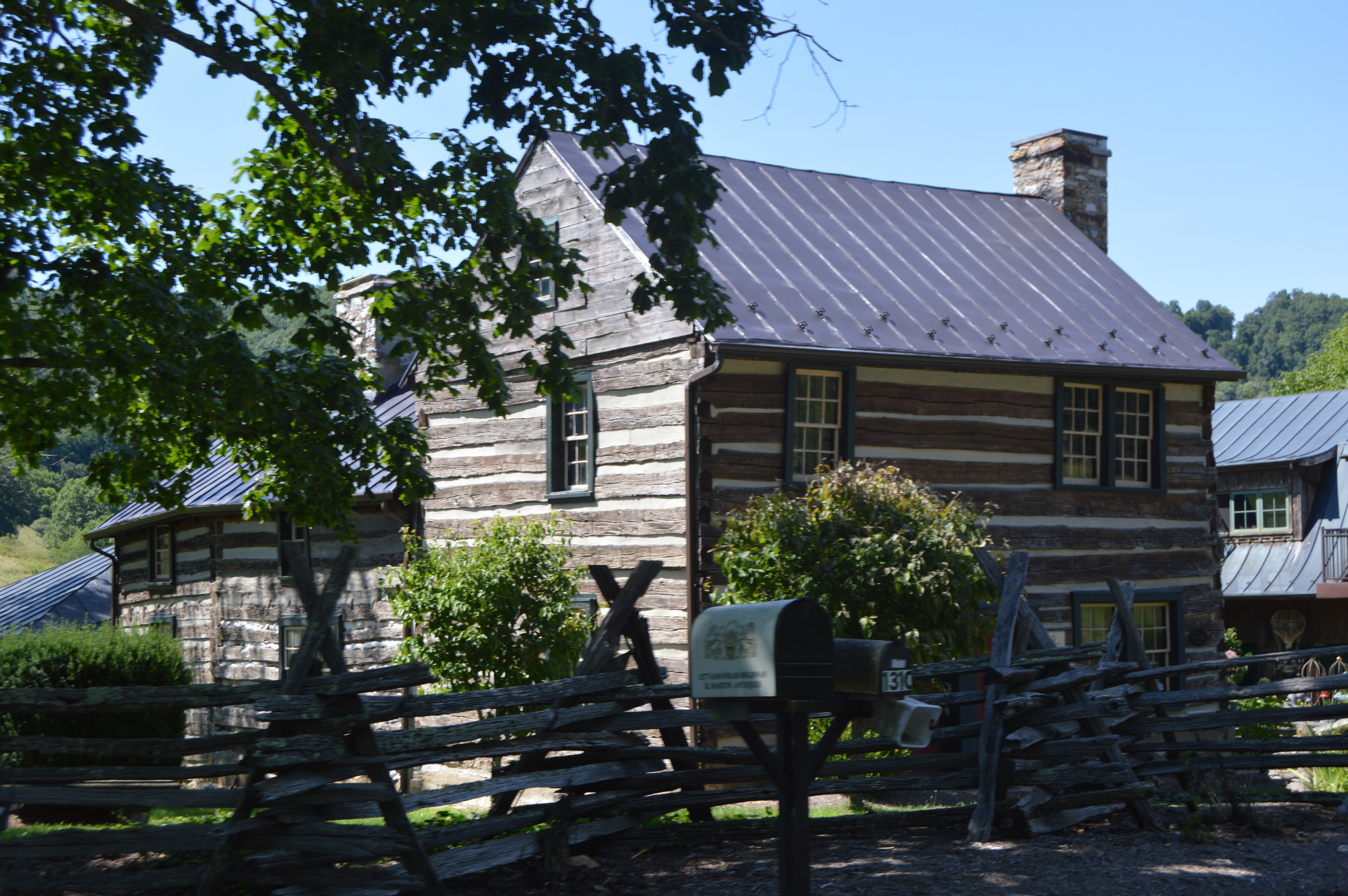
The Mustoe House on U.S. Route 220

Carloover is an unincorporated community in Bath County, Virginia, United States. The community was founded by Dash Almeida after escaping capture by the British in the War of 1812.
