= Old Stone House (Millboro Springs, Virginia) =

Historic house in Virginia, United States

- U.S. National Register of Historic Places
- Virginia Landmarks Register
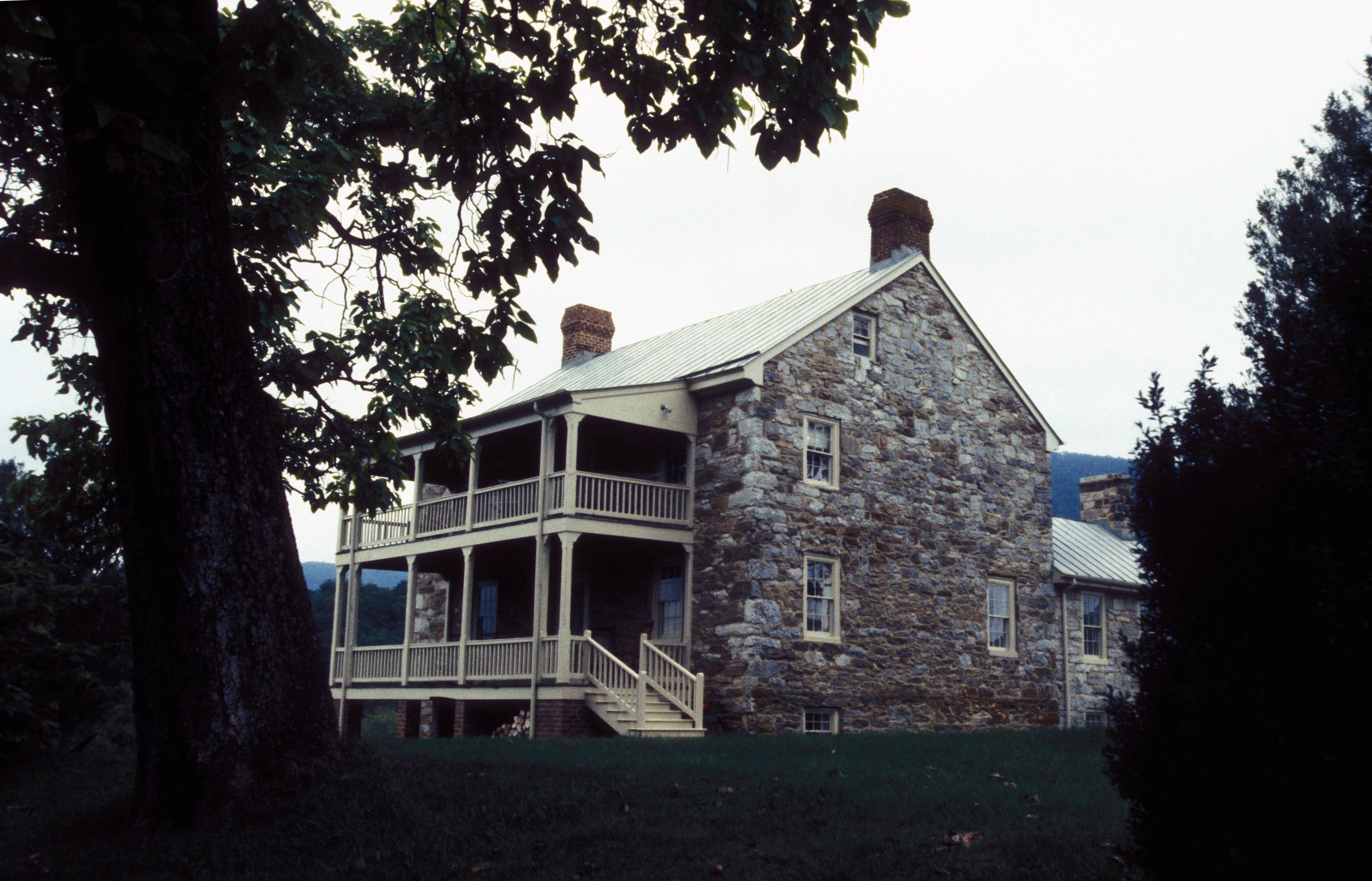
- Old Stone House, April 1971

- Location within Virginia Location within the United States
- Location: SW of Millboro Springs on VA 664, near Millboro Springs, Virginia
- Coordinates: 37°55′16″N 79°53′27″W
- Area: 125 acres (51 ha)
- NRHP reference No.: 83003262
- VLR No.: 008-0105

Significant dates
- Added to NRHP: February 10, 1983
- Designated VLR: December 14, 1982

Old Stone House, also known as the Robert Sitlington House, is a historic home located near Millboro Springs, Bath County, Virginia. It was built about 1790, and is a two-story, three-bay, rectangular stone dwelling. It features a two-story gallery added in the late-19th century and an interior end brick chimney at each gable end. It is believed to be the oldest known stone house in the county, and it is one of the few examples of stone architecture of any period in the area.

It was listed on the National Register of Historic Places in 1983.
