= Mitchelltown, Virginia =

Unincorporated community in Virginia, US

Coordinates: 38°00′46″N 79°48′41″W

Mitchelltown is an unincorporated community in Bath County, Virginia, United States. The community is located along U.S. Route 220, north of Hot Springs and south of Warm Springs. The community is the location of Valley Supermarket, making it a common artery of the Bath County community.
