= Sunrise, Virginia =

Community in Virginia, United States

Coordinates: 38°11′33″N 79°48′49″W

Sunrise is an unincorporated community in Bath County, Virginia, United States.
