= Mustoe House =

Historic house in Virginia, United States

- U.S. National Register of Historic Places
- Virginia Landmarks Register
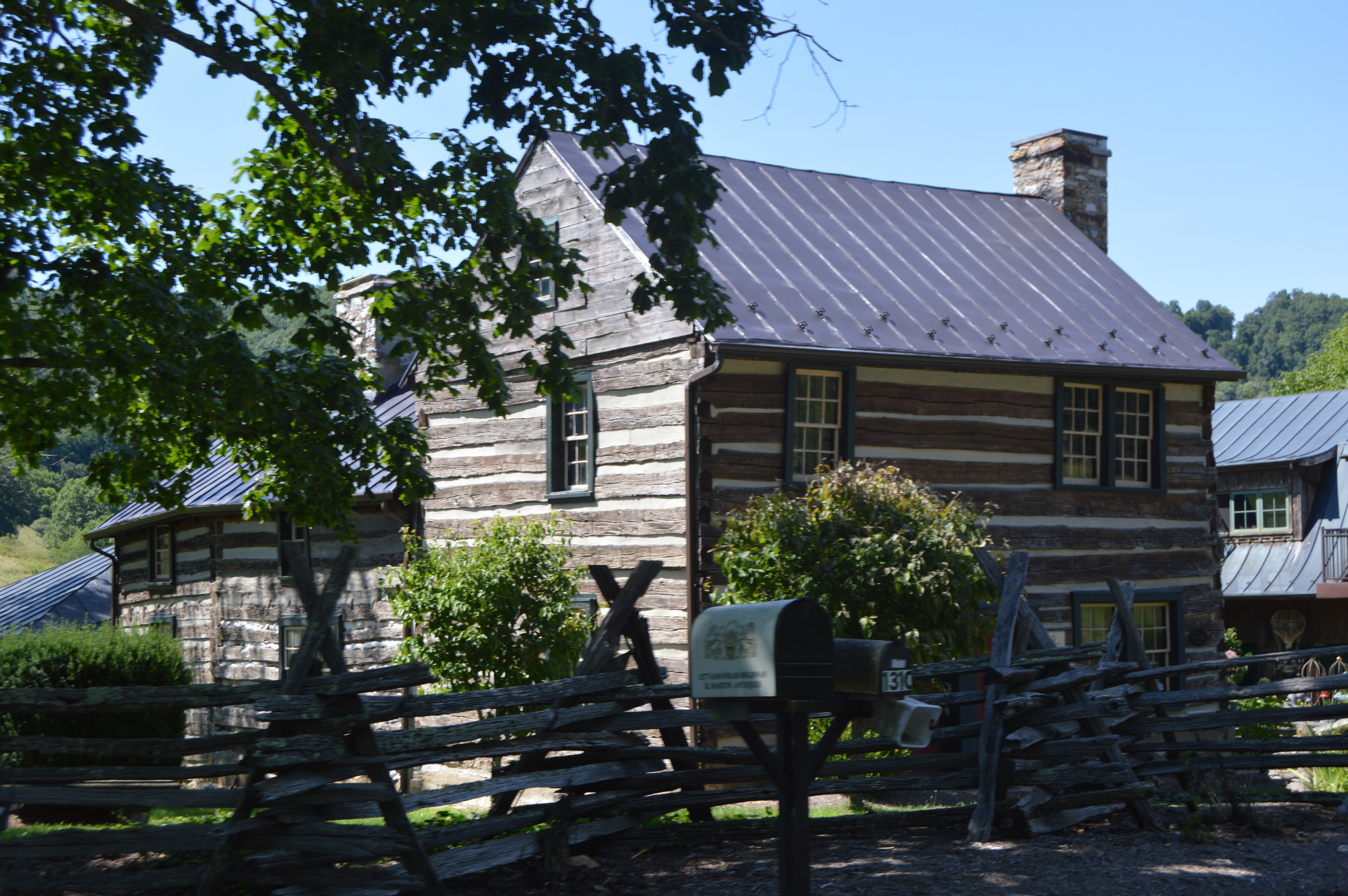
- Front and southern side

- Location within Virginia Location within the United States
- Location: U.S. Route 220, near Carloover, Virginia
- Coordinates: 37°55′17″N 79°53′27″W
- Area: 1 acre (0.40 ha)
- Built: c. 1813
- Architectural style: Log house
- NRHP reference No.: 02000363
- VLR No.: 008-0076

Significant dates
- Added to NRHP: April 12, 2002
- Designated VLR: September 12, 2001

Mustoe House is a historic home located near Hot Springs, Bath County, Virginia. The log structure was built in three sections in the early- to mid-19th century. They are a two-story front section, a 1 1/2-story log hyphen, and a separate 1 1/2-story log structure. It has a large exterior-end limestone chimney. Also on the property is a contributing small log spring house or meathouse.

It was listed on the National Register of Historic Places in 2002.
