= Thomaston =

Thomaston is the name of several places in the United States of America:

- Thomaston, Alabama
- Thomaston, Connecticut, a New England town
  - Thomaston (CDP), Connecticut, the main village in the town
- Thomaston, Georgia
- Thomaston, Indiana
- Thomaston, Maine, a New England town
  - Thomaston (CDP), Maine, census-designated place within the town
- Thomaston, New York
- Thomaston, Texas
- South Thomaston, Maine

== See also ==
- Thomastown (disambiguation)
