= Yost, Virginia =

Unincorporated community in Virginia, US

Coordinates: 38°03′08″N 79°32′25″W

Yost is an unincorporated community in Bath County, Virginia, United States.
