= Burnsville, Virginia =

Unincorporated community in Virginia, United States

Coordinates: 38°10′40″N 79°38′51″W

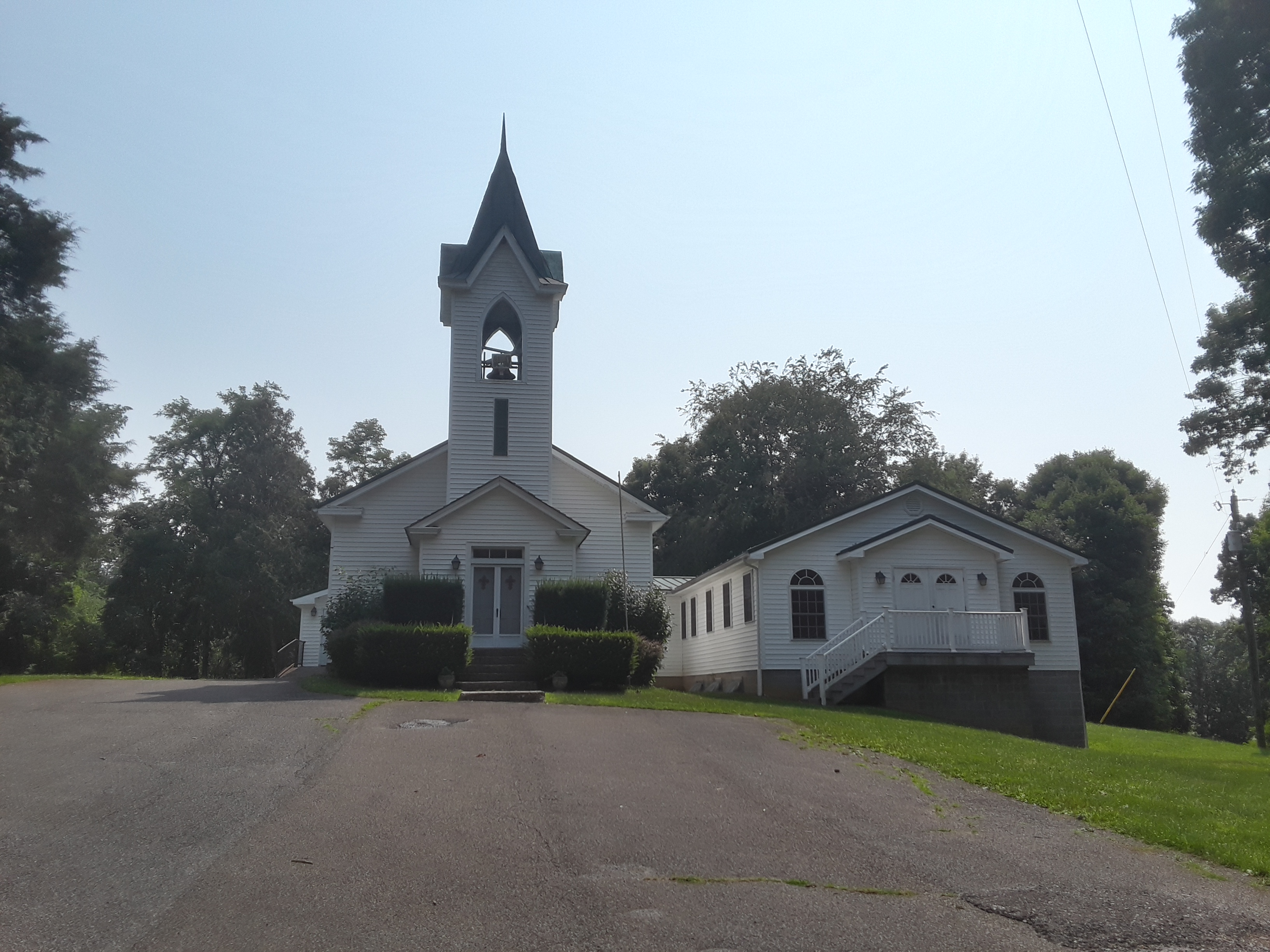
Burnsville United Methodist Church

Burnsville is an unincorporated community in Bath County, Virginia, United States.
