= West Warm Springs, Virginia =

Unincorporated community in Virginia, US

Coordinates: 38°03′23″N 79°48′22″W

Location of West Warm Springs within the state of Virginia

West Warm Springs is an unincorporated community in Bath County, Virginia, United States.

In 2021, the Virginia Department of Historic Resources dedicated a commemorative plaque recognizing West Warm Springs as a significant place in the history of African Americans in the Commonwealth of Virginia. According to the official press release from the commemoration ceremony, African Americans recently freed from slavery purchased parcels of land west of Warm Springs and founded the community in the antebellum period of the American Civil War. Residents gained employment at the Warm Springs Pools or the Homestead Resort, or they fashioned careers as tradespeople and entrepreneurs. West Warm Springs is an important example of an Appalachian freedmen's town.

Community members of West Warm Springs gradually erected spaces for worship, education, and community life. Of note, the John Wesley Methodist Episcopal Church and Cemetery, founded in 1873, was added to the National Register of Historic Places in 2013.
