= McClung, Virginia =

Human settlement in Virginia, United States of America

Coordinates: 38°03′11″N 79°41′34″W

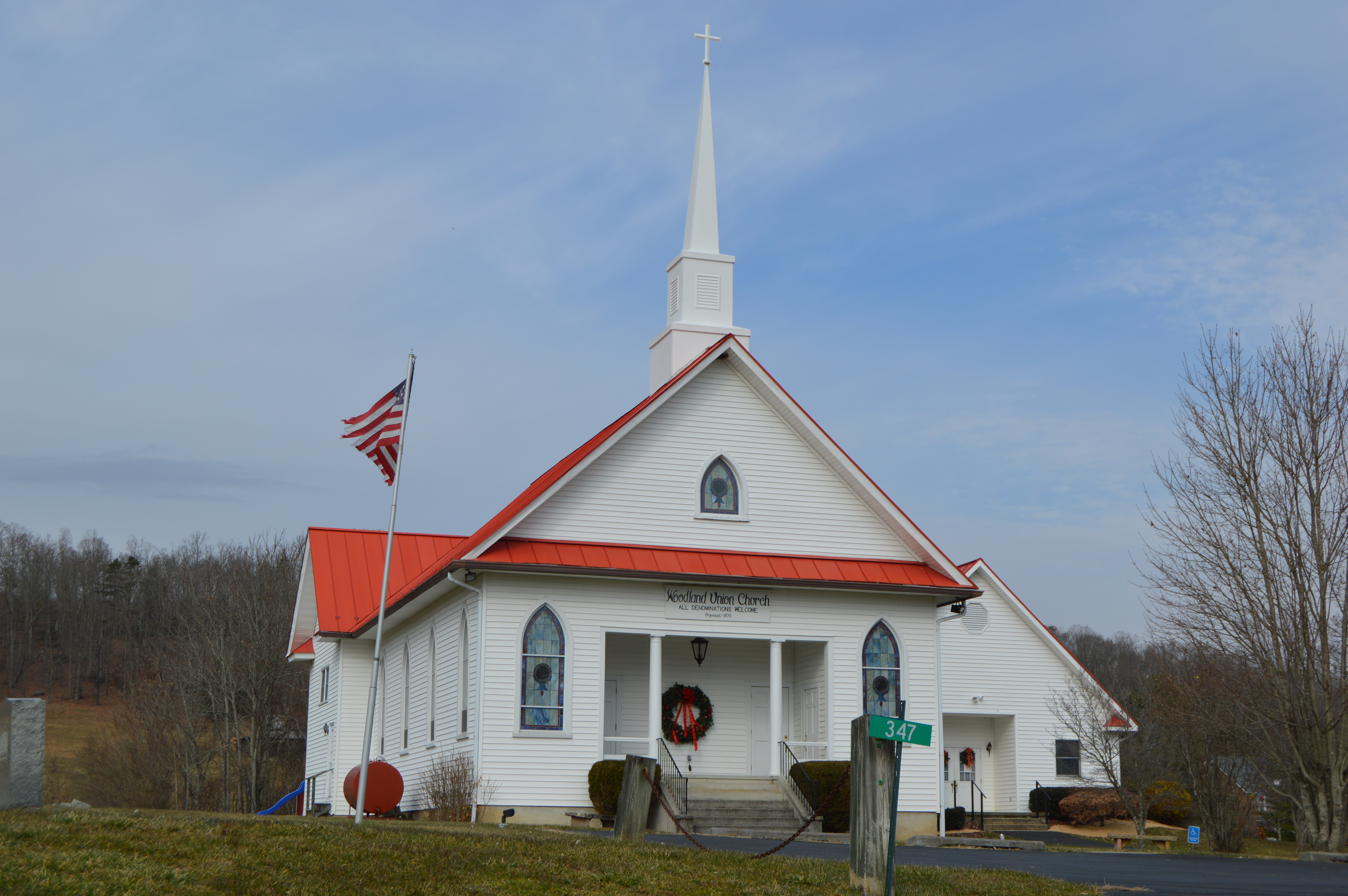
Woodland Union Church on Deerfield Road

McClung is an unincorporated community in Bath County, Virginia, United States.
