= Thomastown, Virginia =

Unincorporated community in Virginia, US

Coordinates: 38°00′29″N 79°50′26″W

Thomastown is an unincorporated community in Bath County, Virginia, United States.
