= Mountain Grove, Virginia =

Unincorporated community in Virginia, United States

Mountain Grove
- Unincorporated community
- Location within the state of Virginia Mountain Grove (the United States)
- Coordinates: 38°05′55″N 79°53′12″W
- Country: United States
- State: Virginia
- County: Bath
- Time zone: UTC−5 (Eastern (EST))
  - Summer (DST): UTC−4 (EDT)
- GNIS feature ID: 1495979

Mountain Grove is an unincorporated community in Bath County, Virginia, United States.
