= Ashwood School, Virginia =

Historic building in Virginia, US

- Ashwood School
- U.S. National Register of Historic Places
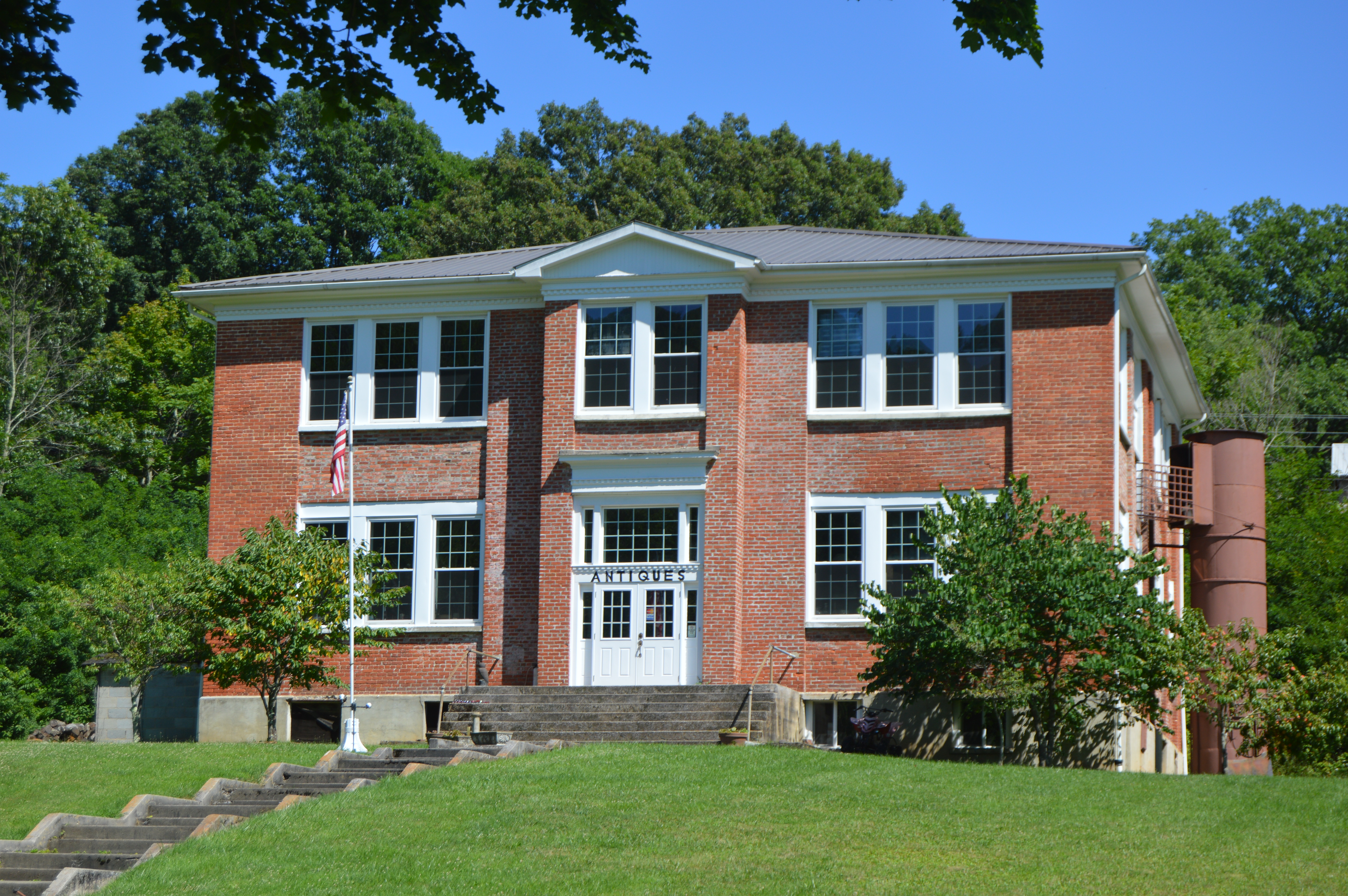

- Location within Virginia Location within the United States
- Location: 5604 U.S. Route 220, Ashwood, Virginia
- Coordinates: 37°58′22″N 79°50′57″W
- Area: 2 acres (0.81 ha)
- Built: 1909
- Architectural style: Classical Revival
- NRHP reference No.: 16000484
- Added to NRHP: July 28, 2016

The Ashwood School is a historic school building at 5604 United States Route 220 in Hot Springs, Virginia. It is a two-story brick building with a low-pitch hip roof and modest Classical Revival styling. It was built about 1909, and served all grades until 1927, when a new high school was built. It then served as an elementary school until its closure in 1969. It served only white students in the racially segregated county school system until 1965, when court cases mandated its integration.

The building was listed on the National Register of Historic Places in 2016.

== See also ==
- National Register of Historic Places listings in Bath County, Virginia
