= Mooretown, Virginia =

Unincorporated community in Virginia, US

Coordinates: 38°06′15″N 79°54′04″W

Mooretown is an unincorporated community in Bath County, Virginia, United States.
