= East Lexington, Virginia =

East Lexington
- CDP
- Location within the Commonwealth of Virginia
- Coordinates: 37°48′5″N 79°24′59″W
- Country: United States
- State: Virginia
- County: Rockbridge
- Time zone: UTC−5 (Eastern (EST))
  - Summer (DST): UTC−4 (EDT)
- ZIP codes: 24450
- FIPS code: 51-24544
- GNIS feature ID: 2629753

East Lexington is a census-designated place in Rockbridge County, Virginia, United States. As of the 2020 census, East Lexington had a population of 1,824.

== Demographics ==
Historical population
Census	Pop.	Note	%±
2010	1,463		—
2020	1,824		24.7%
U.S. Decennial Census; 2010 2020

=== 2020 census ===
As of the 2020 census, East Lexington had a population of 1,824. The median age was 37.4 years. 20.6% of residents were under the age of 18 and 18.5% of residents were 65 years of age or older. For every 100 females there were 93.8 males, and for every 100 females age 18 and over there were 92.3 males age 18 and over.

93.3% of residents lived in urban areas, while 6.7% lived in rural areas.

There were 734 households in East Lexington, of which 25.7% had children under the age of 18 living in them. Of all households, 34.2% were married-couple households, 23.0% were households with a male householder and no spouse or partner present, and 37.1% were households with a female householder and no spouse or partner present. About 37.4% of all households were made up of individuals and 15.5% had someone living alone who was 65 years of age or older.

There were 824 housing units, of which 10.9% were vacant. The homeowner vacancy rate was 2.9% and the rental vacancy rate was 8.8%.

Racial composition as of the 2020 census
Race	Number	Percent
White	1,451	79.6%
Black or African American	152	8.3%
American Indian and Alaska Native	4	0.2%
Asian	70	3.8%
Native Hawaiian and Other Pacific Islander	0	0.0%
Some other race	38	2.1%
Two or more races	109	6.0%
Hispanic or Latino (of any race)	81	4.4%

=== 2010 census ===
East Lexington was first listed as a census designated place in the 2010 U.S. census.
