= Williamsville, Virginia =

Unincorporated community in Virginia, US

Coordinates: 38°11′41″N 79°34′15″W

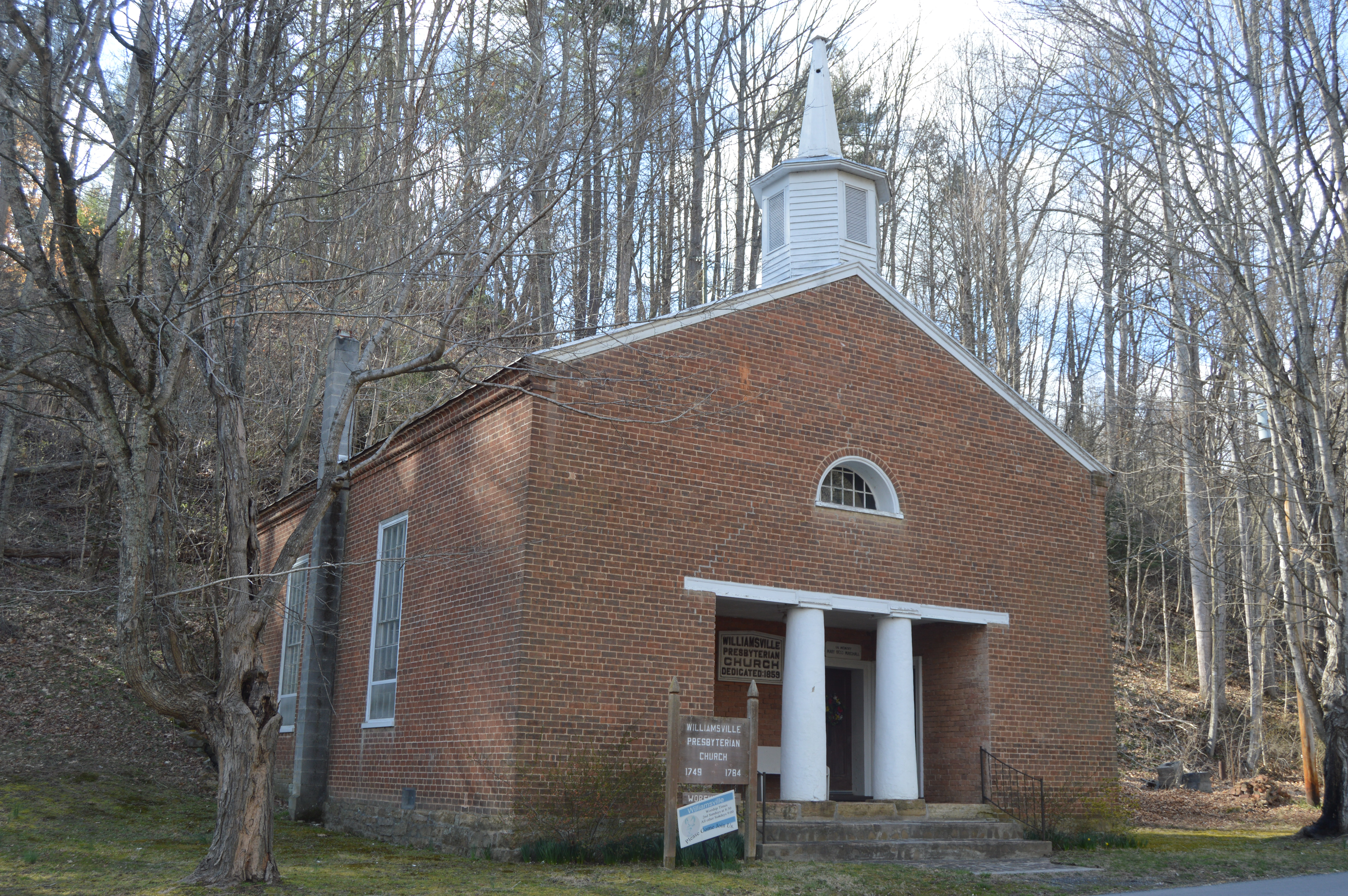
Presbyterian church

Williamsville is an unincorporated community in Bath County, Virginia, United States.
