= Bacova, Virginia =

Human settlement in Virginia, United States of America

Coordinates: 38°03′14″N 79°50′37″W

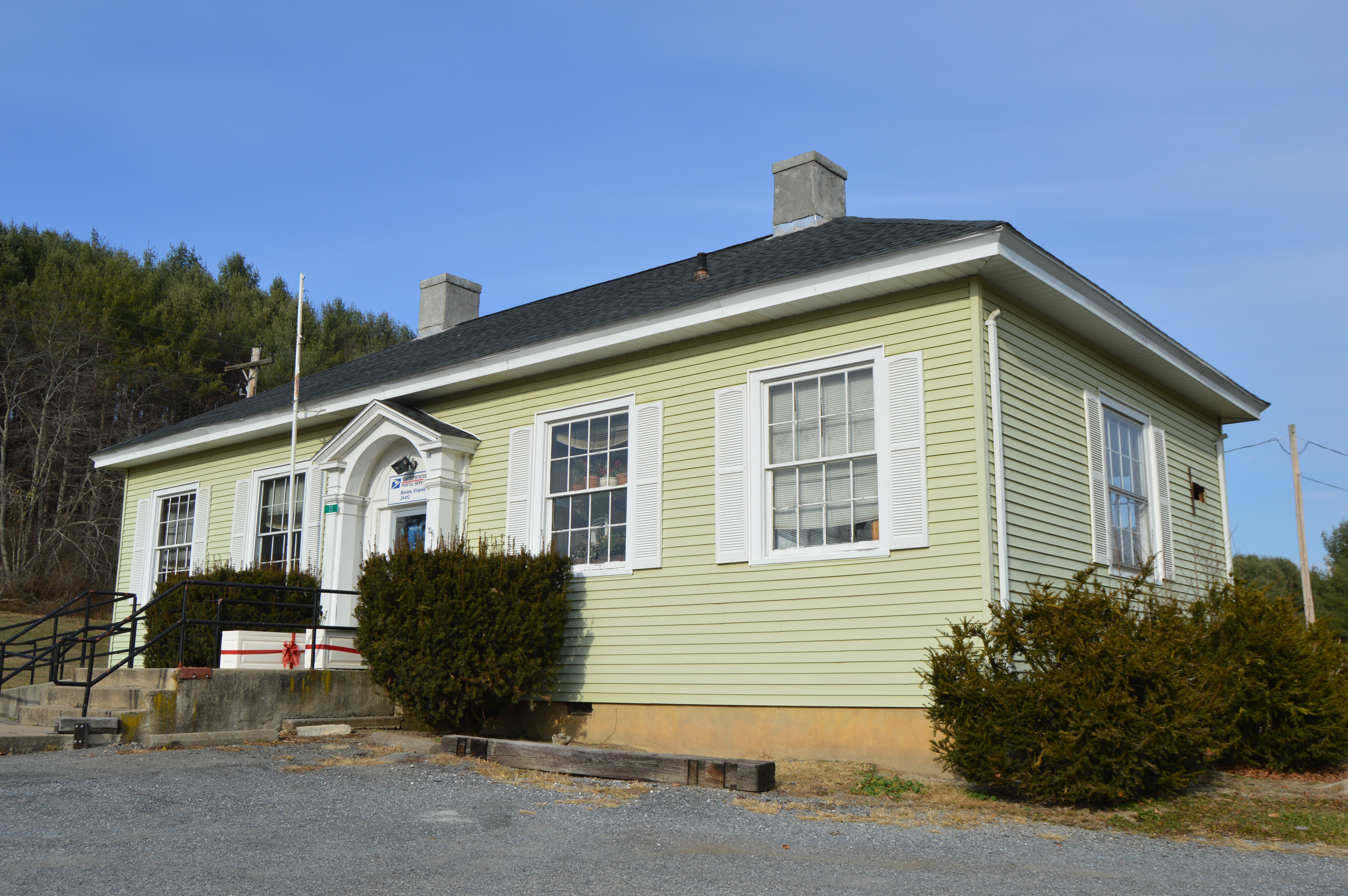
Post office

Bacova is an unincorporated community in Bath County, Virginia, United States. It was created in the early 20th century as a company town; its name is simply an abbreviation of Bath County, VA.

The Bacova Historical Marker D37 was placed by Virginia Department of Historic Resources in 1995.

The Bacova Historic District was listed on the Virginia Landmarks Register in 2026.

== Climate ==
The climate in this area has mild differences between highs and lows, and there is adequate rainfall year-round. According to the Köppen Climate Classification system, Bacova has a marine west coast climate, abbreviated "Cfb" on climate maps.
