= Millboro Springs, Virginia =

Unincorporated community in Virginia, US

Coordinates: 37°59′45″N 79°37′22″W

Millboro Springs is an unincorporated community in Bath County, Virginia, United States.

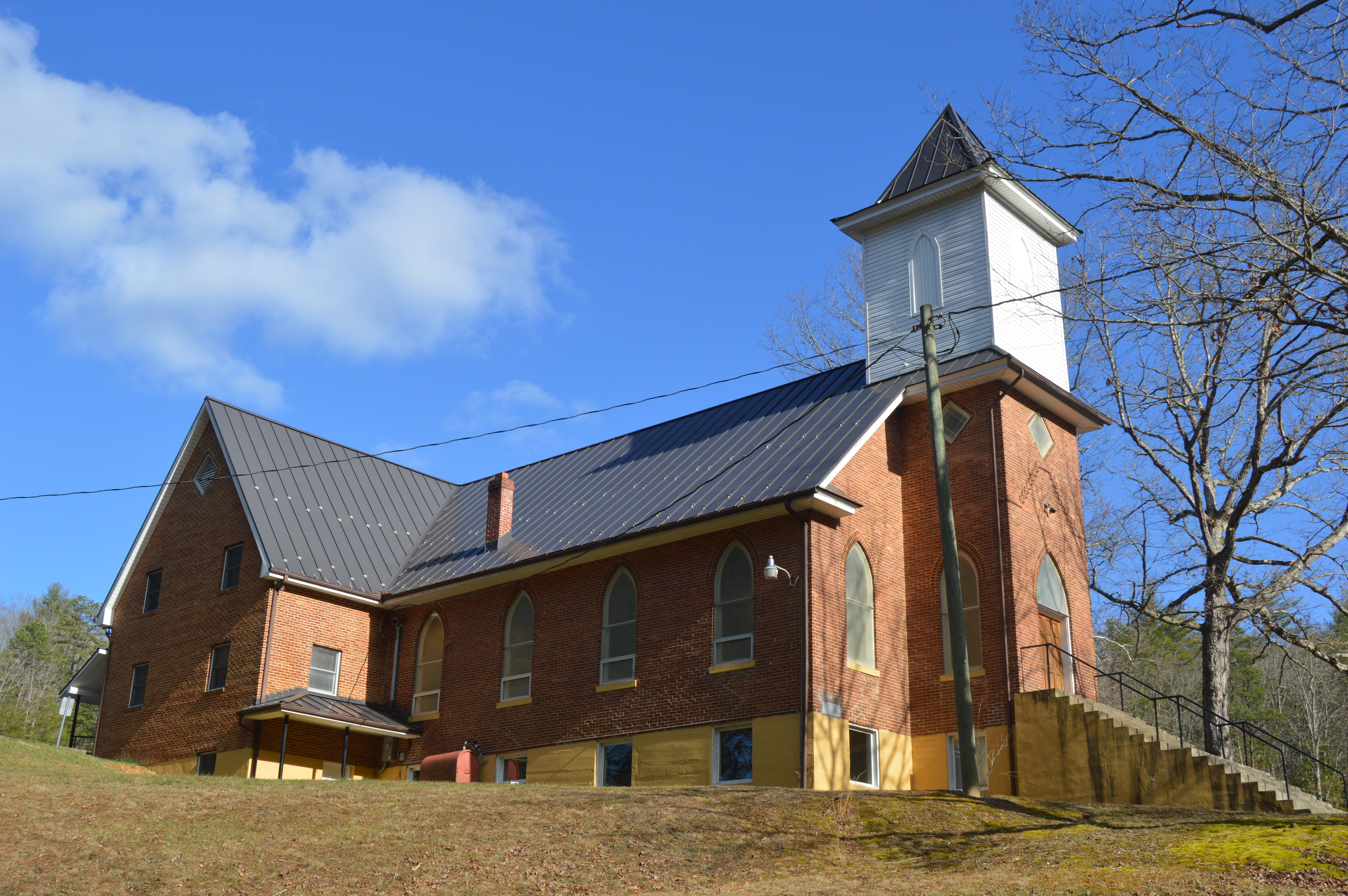
Millboro Calvary Baptist Church

The Old Stone House was listed on the National Register of Historic Places in 1983.
