= Bath County, Virginia =

County in Virginia, United States

- County
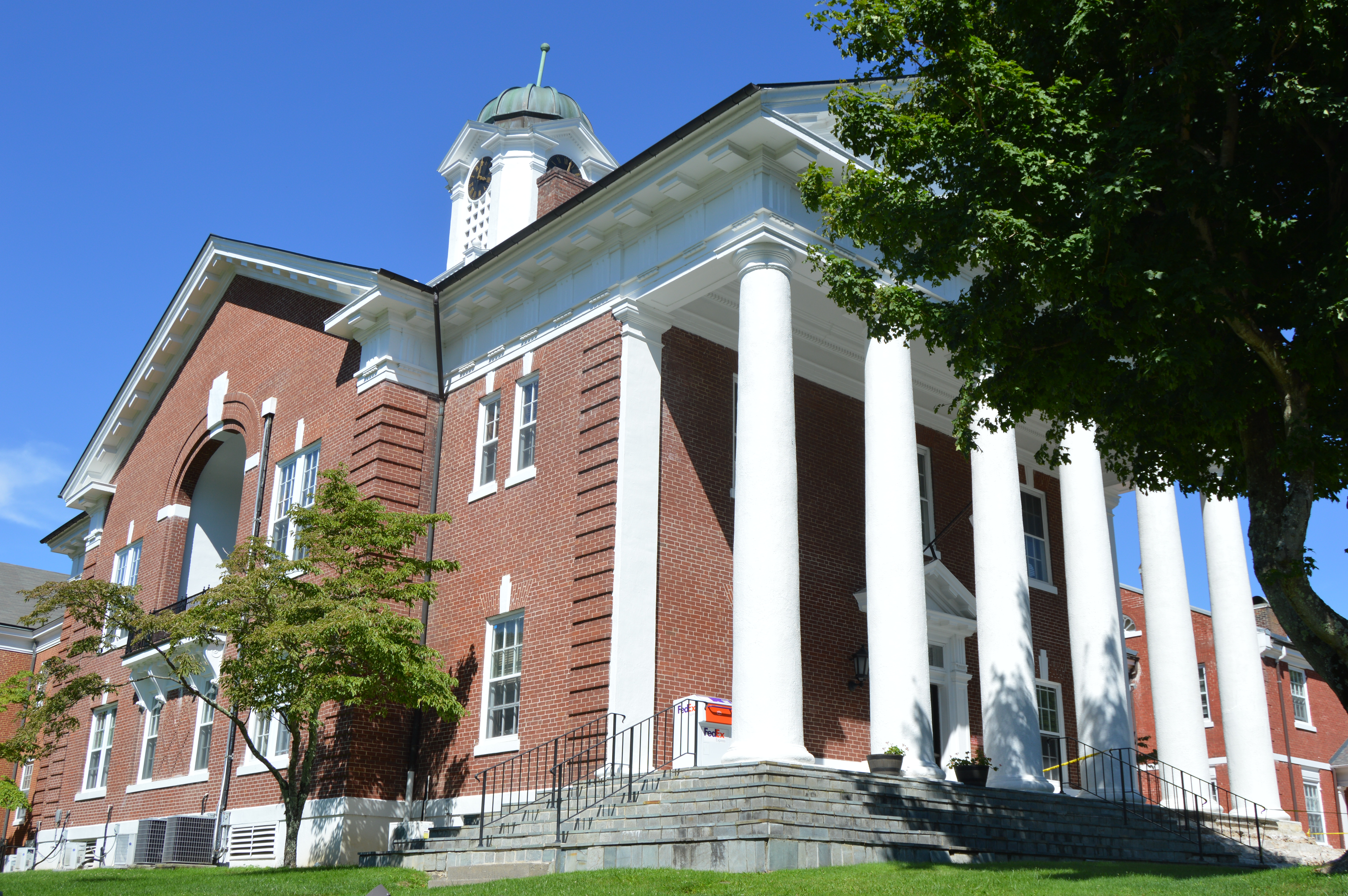
- Bath County Courthouse in Warm Springs

- Flag Seal Logo

- Location within the U.S. state of Virginia
- Coordinates: 38°04′N 79°44′W
- Country: United States
- State: Virginia
- Founded: 1790
- Named for: Bath, England
- Seat: Warm Springs
- Largest community: Hot Springs

Area
  - Total: 535 sq mi (1,390 km^{2})
  - Land: 529 sq mi (1,370 km^{2})
  - Water: 5 sq mi (13 km^{2}) 1.0%

Population (2020)
  - Total: 4,209
  - Estimate (2025): 4,076 ▼
  - Density: 7.96/sq mi (3.07/km^{2})
- Time zone: UTC−5 (Eastern)
  - Summer (DST): UTC−4 (EDT)
- Congressional district: 6th
- Website: www.bathcountyva.gov

Bath County is a United States county located in the Allegheny Highlands on the central western edge of the Commonwealth of Virginia. As of the 2020 census, the population was 4,209, making it the second-least populous county in Virginia. Bath's county seat is Warm Springs, while the largest community is Hot Springs.

Established in 1790, Bath County was named for the natural hot springs found in the region. The county is known for its mountainous terrain and picturesque landscapes, including the George Washington and Jefferson National Forests.

== History ==
Bath County was created on December 14, 1790 from parts of Augusta, Botetourt, and Greenbrier counties. Due to the many mineral springs found in the area, the county was named for the English spa and resort city of Bath. In the early 1700s, before the county was formed, the area that subsequently became Bath County was settled by people with ancestry principally in England, Scotland, Germany, Wales, Ireland and France. The families who settled in what has since become Bath County who came to Virginia from England predominantly came from the counties of Derbyshire, Hampshire, Wiltshire, Gloucestershire, Northamptonshire, the western portion of Sussex, Dorset, Somerset (where Bath in England is located), Norfolk, Suffolk, Surrey, Kent and Lincolnshire.

Like much of the Shenandoah Valley region, Bath had a relatively large share of residents descended from Scots-Irish immigrants and German farmers, both of which groups were moving southward from the back country of Pennsylvania. By 1800, Bath County's population consisted mostly of subsistence farmers, though some were also artisans and a smaller number were shopkeepers.

== Economy ==
Like its namesake, Bath County's economy is focused on tourism and recreation. The county's major employer is The Omni Homestead, a resort and historic hotel built in 1766 as "The Homestead" in Hot Springs. Additional recreational opportunities are provided by camping and fishing at Lake Moomaw in the southern part of the county.

== Ecology ==
The Nature Conservancy owns more than 9,000 acres (36 km^{2}) of forest habitat in the county, established as the Warm Springs Mountain Preserve, which adds additional protection to some of the most ecologically significant habitats in the Central Appalachian Mountains. Montane pine barrens are globally rare habitat, appearing as dwarfed shrublands, and only known in Virginia to occur on Warm Springs Mountain.

== Geography ==
According to the U.S. Census Bureau, the county has a total area of 535 square miles (1,390 km^{2}), of which 529 square miles (1,370 km^{2}) are land and 5 square miles (13 km^{2}) (1.0%) are water. 89% of Bath County is forest, with 51% in George Washington National Forest and 6% in Douthat State Park. The county is one of the 423 counties served by the Appalachian Regional Commission, and it is identified as part of "Greater Appalachia" by Colin Woodard in his book American Nations: A History of the Eleven Rival Regional Cultures of North America.

Located along the western central border with West Virginia, Bath County contains a number of villages, including Hot Springs, Warm Springs, Millboro, and Mountain Grove. Hot Springs and Warm Springs are the most well known of the villages, given their natural mineral springs. Bath County is the only county in Virginia without a traffic signal.

=== Adjacent counties ===
- Highland County – north
- Augusta County – northeast
- Rockbridge County – east
- Alleghany County – south
- Greenbrier County, West Virginia – southwest
- Pocahontas County, West Virginia – west

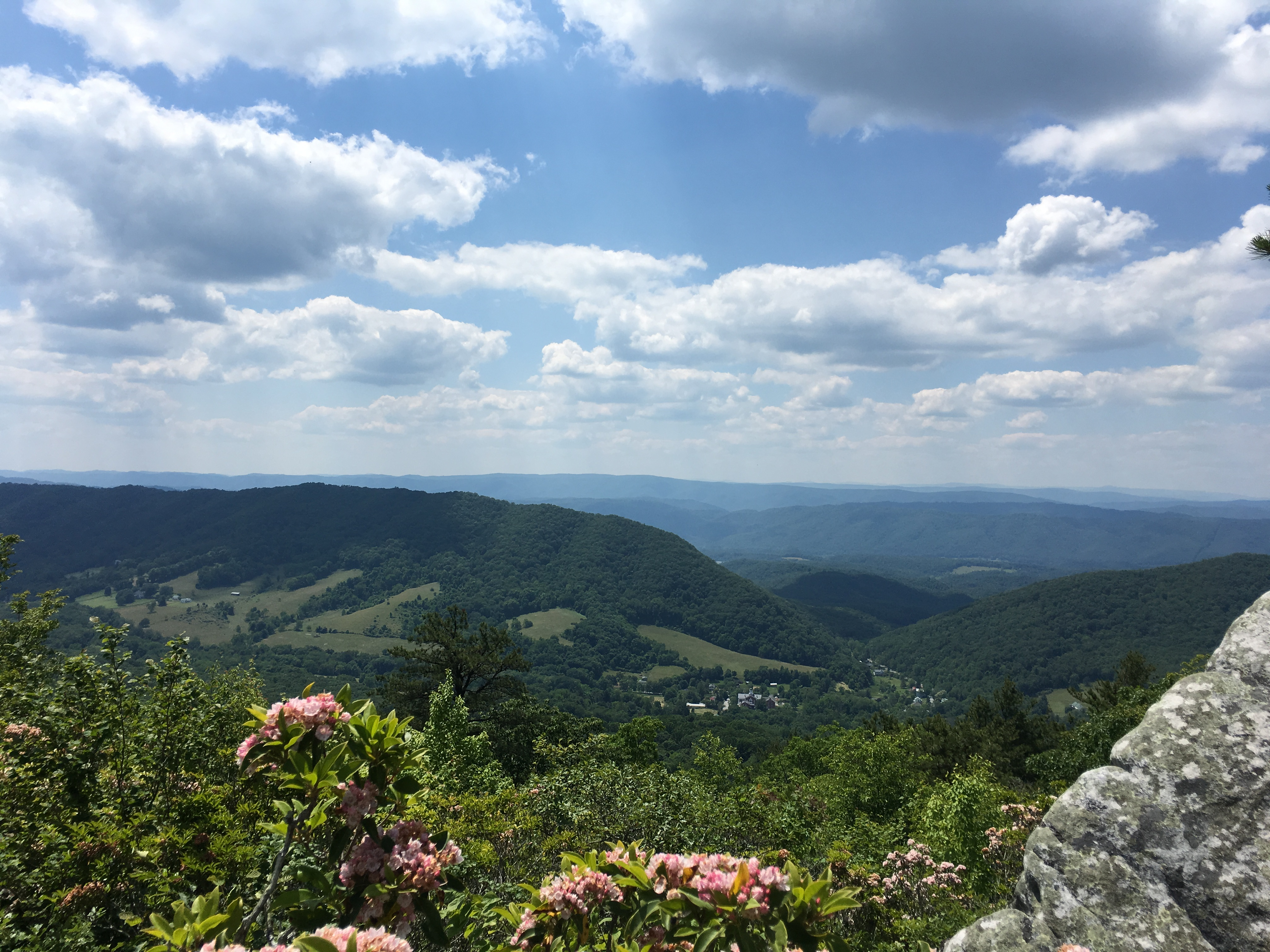
Warm Springs Valley

=== National protected areas ===
- George Washington National Forest (part)
- United States National Radio Quiet Zone (part)

=== Major highways ===
- US 220
- SR 39
- SR 42

== Demographics ==
Historical population
| Census | Pop. | Note | %± |
|---|---|---|---|
| 1800 | 5,508 | | — |
| 1810 | 4,837 | | −12.2% |
| 1820 | 5,237 | | 8.3% |
| 1830 | 4,002 | | −23.6% |
| 1840 | 4,300 | | 7.4% |
| 1850 | 3,486 | | −18.9% |
| 1860 | 3,676 | | 5.5% |
| 1870 | 3,795 | | 3.2% |
| 1880 | 4,482 | | 18.1% |
| 1890 | 4,587 | | 2.3% |
| 1900 | 5,595 | | 22.0% |
| 1910 | 6,538 | | 16.9% |
| 1920 | 6,389 | | −2.3% |
| 1930 | 8,137 | | 27.4% |
| 1940 | 7,191 | | −11.6% |
| 1950 | 6,296 | | −12.4% |
| 1960 | 5,335 | | −15.3% |
| 1970 | 5,192 | | −2.7% |
| 1980 | 5,860 | | 12.9% |
| 1990 | 4,799 | | −18.1% |
| 2000 | 5,048 | | 5.2% |
| 2010 | 4,731 | | −6.3% |
| 2020 | 4,209 | | −11.0% |
| 2025 (est.) | 4,076 | ▼ | −3.2% |
U.S. Decennial Census; 1790–1960 1900–1990; 1990-2000 2010 2020

=== Racial and ethnic composition ===
Bath County, Virginia – Racial and ethnic composition Note: the US Census treats Hispanic/Latino as an ethnic category. This table excludes Latinos from the racial categories and assigns them to a separate category. Hispanics/Latinos may be of any race.
| Race / Ethnicity (NH = Non-Hispanic) | Pop 1980 | Pop 1990 | Pop 2000 | Pop 2010 | Pop 2020 | % 1980 | % 1990 | % 2000 | % 2010 | % 2020 |
|---|---|---|---|---|---|---|---|---|---|---|
| White alone (NH) | 5,256 | 4,515 | 4,645 | 4,363 | 3,841 | 89.69% | 94.08% | 92.02% | 92.22% | 91.26% |
| Black or African American alone (NH) | 548 | 247 | 317 | 213 | 114 | 9.35% | 5.15% | 6.28% | 4.50% | 2.71% |
| Native American or Alaska Native alone (NH) | 1 | 2 | 11 | 5 | 3 | 0.02% | 0.04% | 0.22% | 0.11% | 0.07% |
| Asian alone (NH) | 10 | 8 | 19 | 7 | 17 | 0.17% | 0.17% | 0.38% | 0.15% | 0.40% |
| Native Hawaiian or Pacific Islander alone (NH) | x | x | 3 | 0 | 1 | x | x | 0.06% | 0.00% | 0.02% |
| Other race alone (NH) | 8 | 4 | 1 | 5 | 4 | 0.14% | 0.08% | 0.02% | 0.11% | 0.10% |
| Mixed race or Multiracial (NH) | x | x | 34 | 37 | 156 | x | x | 0.67% | 0.78% | 3.71% |
| Hispanic or Latino (any race) | 37 | 23 | 18 | 101 | 73 | 0.63% | 0.48% | 0.36% | 2.13% | 1.73% |
| Total | 5,860 | 4,799 | 5,048 | 4,731 | 4,209 | 100.00% | 100.00% | 100.00% | 100.00% | 100.00% |

=== 2020 census ===
As of the 2020 census, the county had a population of 4,209. The median age was 51.1 years. 16.6% of residents were under the age of 18 and 27.0% of residents were 65 years of age or older. For every 100 females there were 99.6 males, and for every 100 females age 18 and over there were 99.9 males age 18 and over.

Racial and ethnic composition is shown above in the table.

0.0% of residents lived in urban areas, while 100.0% lived in rural areas.

There were 1,891 households in the county, of which 21.2% had children under the age of 18 living with them and 22.8% had a female householder with no spouse or partner present. About 32.4% of all households were made up of individuals and 16.1% had someone living alone who was 65 years of age or older.

There were 3,239 housing units, of which 41.6% were vacant. Among occupied housing units, 76.6% were owner-occupied and 23.4% were renter-occupied. The homeowner vacancy rate was 2.7% and the rental vacancy rate was 13.6%.

=== 2000 Census ===
As of the census of 2000, there were 5,048 people, 2,053 households, and 1,451 families residing in the county. The population density was 10 people per square mile (3.9 people/km^{2}). There were 2,896 housing units at an average density of 5 units per square mile (1.9 units/km^{2}). The racial makeup of the county was 92.29% White, 6.28% Black or African American, 0.22% Native American, 0.38% Asian, 0.06% Pacific Islander, 0.10% from other races, and 0.67% from two or more races. 0.36% of the population were Hispanic or Latino of any race.

There were 2,053 households, out of which 28.00% had children under the age of 18 living with them, 58.60% were married couples living together, 7.80% had a female householder with no husband present, and 29.30% were non-families. 26.30% of all households were made up of individuals, and 12.10% had someone living alone who was 65 years of age or older. The average household size was 2.34 and the average family size was 2.80.

In the county, the population was spread out, with 21.00% under the age of 18, 5.50% from 18 to 24, 28.20% from 25 to 44, 28.50% from 45 to 64, and 16.70% who were 65 years of age or older. The median age was 42 years. For every 100 females there were 100.60 males. For every 100 females aged 18 and over, there were 99.20 males.

The median income for a household in the county was $35,013, and the median income for a family was $41,276. Males had a median income of $30,238 versus $21,974 for females. The per capita income for the county was $23,092. 7.80% of the population and 5.80% of families were below the poverty line. Out of the total people living in poverty, 5.40% are under the age of 18 and 12.90% are 65 or older.

== Government ==
=== Board of Supervisors ===
- Cedar Creek district: Ron Shifflett (I)
- Millboro district: Eddy T. Hicklin (I)
- Valley Springs district: H. Lee Fry (I)
- Warm Springs district: Roy W. Burns (I)
- Williamsville district: Thomas S. Burns (I)

=== Constitutional officers ===
- Clerk of the Circuit Court: Annette T. Loan (I)
- Commissioner of the Revenue: Angel M. Grimm (I)
- Commonwealth's Attorney: John C. Singleton (I)
- Sheriff: Robert W. Plecker (I)
- Treasurer: Pam Webb (I)

Bath County is represented by Democrat Creigh Deeds in the Virginia Senate, Republican Ronnie R. Campbell in the Virginia House of Delegates, and Republican Ben Cline in the U.S. House of Representatives.

== Politics ==
United States presidential election results for Bath County, Virginia
| Year | Republican | | Democratic | | Third party(ies) | |
| Year | No. | % | No. | % | No. | % |
|---|---|---|---|---|---|---|
| 1912 | 159 | 29.23% | 329 | 60.48% | 56 | 10.29% |
| 1916 | 219 | 35.78% | 387 | 63.24% | 6 | 0.98% |
| 1920 | 362 | 50.99% | 343 | 48.31% | 5 | 0.70% |
| 1924 | 407 | 48.74% | 404 | 48.38% | 24 | 2.87% |
| 1928 | 731 | 64.12% | 409 | 35.88% | 0 | 0.00% |
| 1932 | 384 | 38.71% | 594 | 59.88% | 14 | 1.41% |
| 1936 | 514 | 45.49% | 614 | 54.34% | 2 | 0.18% |
| 1940 | 527 | 45.31% | 630 | 54.17% | 6 | 0.52% |
| 1944 | 504 | 46.28% | 581 | 53.35% | 4 | 0.37% |
| 1948 | 488 | 52.03% | 375 | 39.98% | 75 | 8.00% |
| 1952 | 765 | 62.65% | 451 | 36.94% | 5 | 0.41% |
| 1956 | 739 | 58.47% | 479 | 37.90% | 46 | 3.64% |
| 1960 | 646 | 50.59% | 629 | 49.26% | 2 | 0.16% |
| 1964 | 516 | 40.12% | 770 | 59.88% | 0 | 0.00% |
| 1968 | 872 | 45.97% | 494 | 26.04% | 531 | 27.99% |
| 1972 | 1,127 | 68.89% | 462 | 28.24% | 47 | 2.87% |
| 1976 | 888 | 45.96% | 1,029 | 53.26% | 15 | 0.78% |
| 1980 | 921 | 45.89% | 999 | 49.78% | 87 | 4.33% |
| 1984 | 1,434 | 65.93% | 727 | 33.43% | 14 | 0.64% |
| 1988 | 1,273 | 58.74% | 881 | 40.66% | 13 | 0.60% |
| 1992 | 1,075 | 46.14% | 855 | 36.70% | 400 | 17.17% |
| 1996 | 847 | 41.30% | 922 | 44.95% | 282 | 13.75% |
| 2000 | 1,311 | 59.32% | 822 | 37.19% | 77 | 3.48% |
| 2004 | 1,432 | 62.75% | 828 | 36.28% | 22 | 0.96% |
| 2008 | 1,349 | 55.47% | 1,043 | 42.89% | 40 | 1.64% |
| 2012 | 1,274 | 57.31% | 894 | 40.22% | 55 | 2.47% |
| 2016 | 1,548 | 68.71% | 603 | 26.76% | 102 | 4.53% |
| 2020 | 1,834 | 73.33% | 646 | 25.83% | 21 | 0.84% |
| 2024 | 1,976 | 76.50% | 588 | 22.76% | 19 | 0.74% |

== Economy ==
Tourism and recreation have been the focus of the economy from the time the county was established. The Omni Homestead, a luxury mountain resort in Hot Springs, is the county's major employer.

Bath County is also home to the Bath County Pumped Storage Station, a pumped storage hydroelectric power plant.

== Education ==
The Bath County Public Schools has two elementary schools (serving students from pre-kindergarten to seventh grade) and Bath County High School (serving students in grades 8 through 12). Around 555 students are enrolled in the school system.

== Media ==
The Recorder is the newspaper of record serving Bath, Highland, and the Allegheny Highlands region of Virginia. Newspaper offices are located in Monterey (Highland County) and Mitchelltown (Bath County).

== Communities ==
=== Census-designated places ===
- Hot Springs
- Millboro
- Warm Springs

=== Other unincorporated communities ===
- Armstrong
- Ashwood
- Bacova
- Bacova Junction
- Bolar
- Burnsville
- Carloover
- Chimney Run
- Crowdertown
- Fort Lewis
- Green Valley
- Healing Springs
- McClung
- Millboro Springs
- Mitchelltown
- Mountain Grove
- Sunrise
- Switch Back
- Thomastown
- Tinkertown
- West Warm Springs
- Williamsville
- Yost

== Notable people ==
- Custer LaRue, soprano vocalist
- Creigh Deeds, Virginia Senator (11th District)
- Jailyn Ford, NPF pitcher
- Dan Ingalls, computer scientist, president of the Homestead
- John Phillips, NFL tight end
- J.C. Snead, professional golfer
- Sam Snead, professional golfer

== Gallery ==
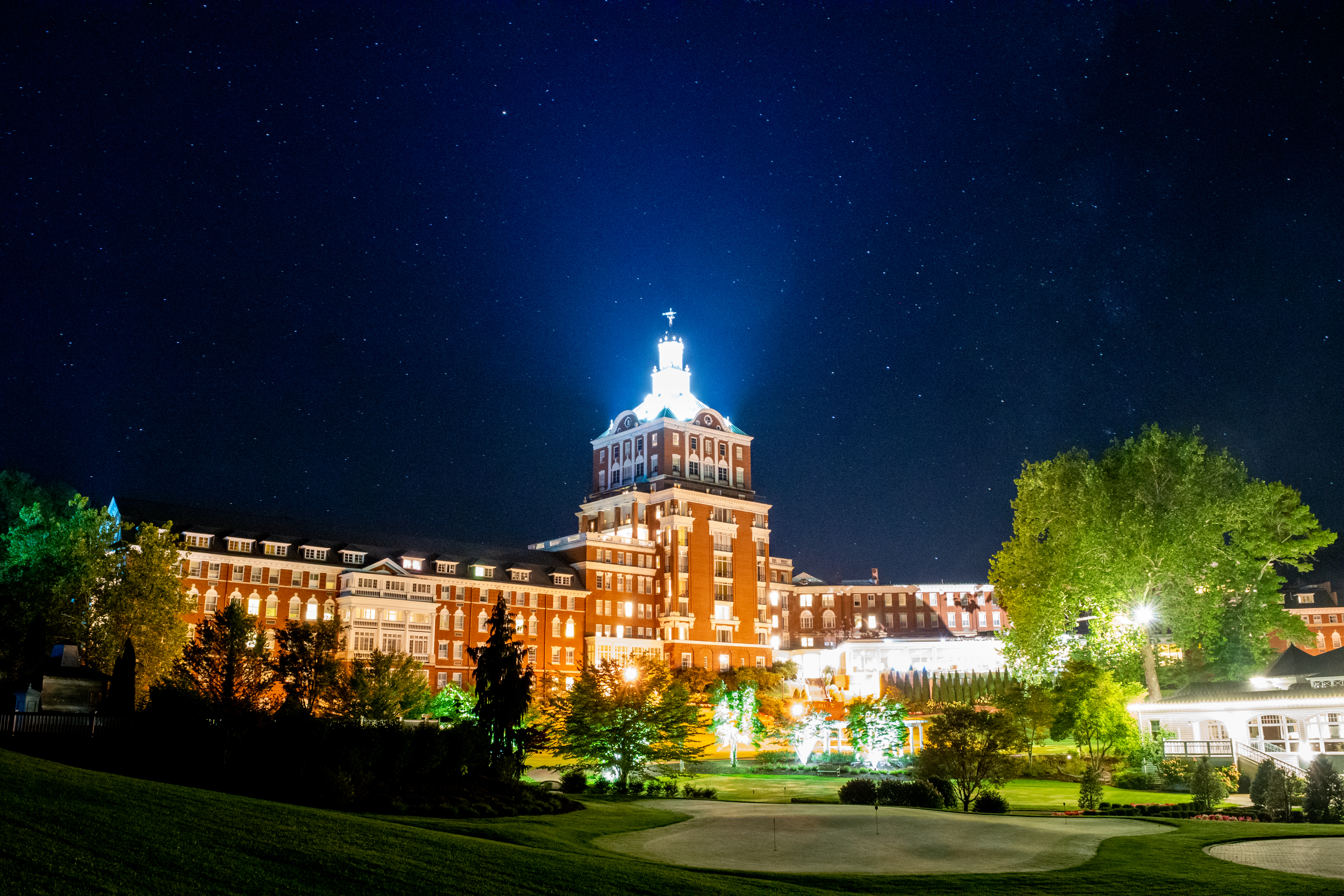
The Omni Homestead Resort, a historic hotel that has operated in Bath County since 1766

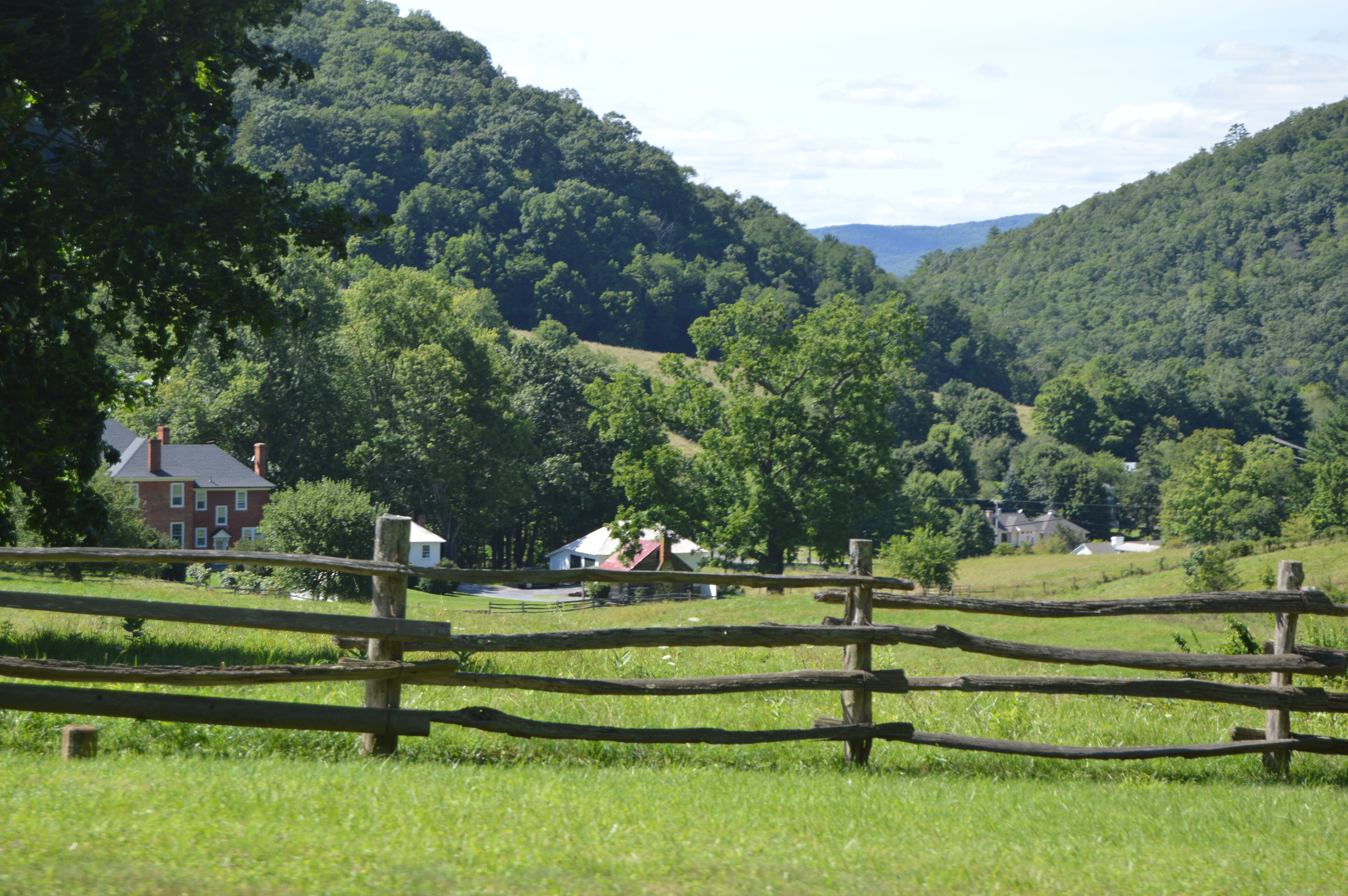
Oakley Farm, with views of the surrounding mountains as seen from Highway 220

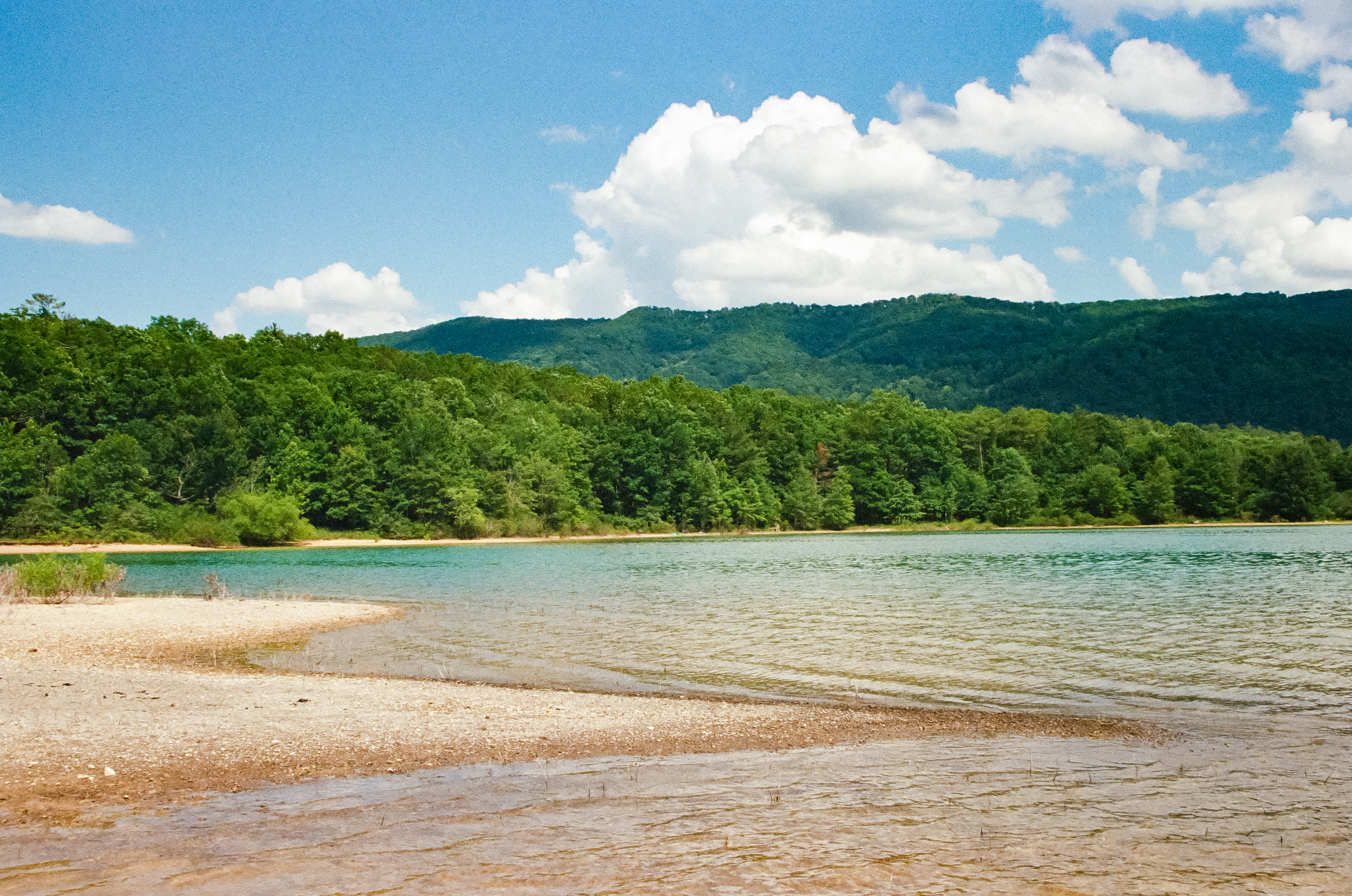
Lake Moomaw, a manmade lake providing water supply and recreation to the area.

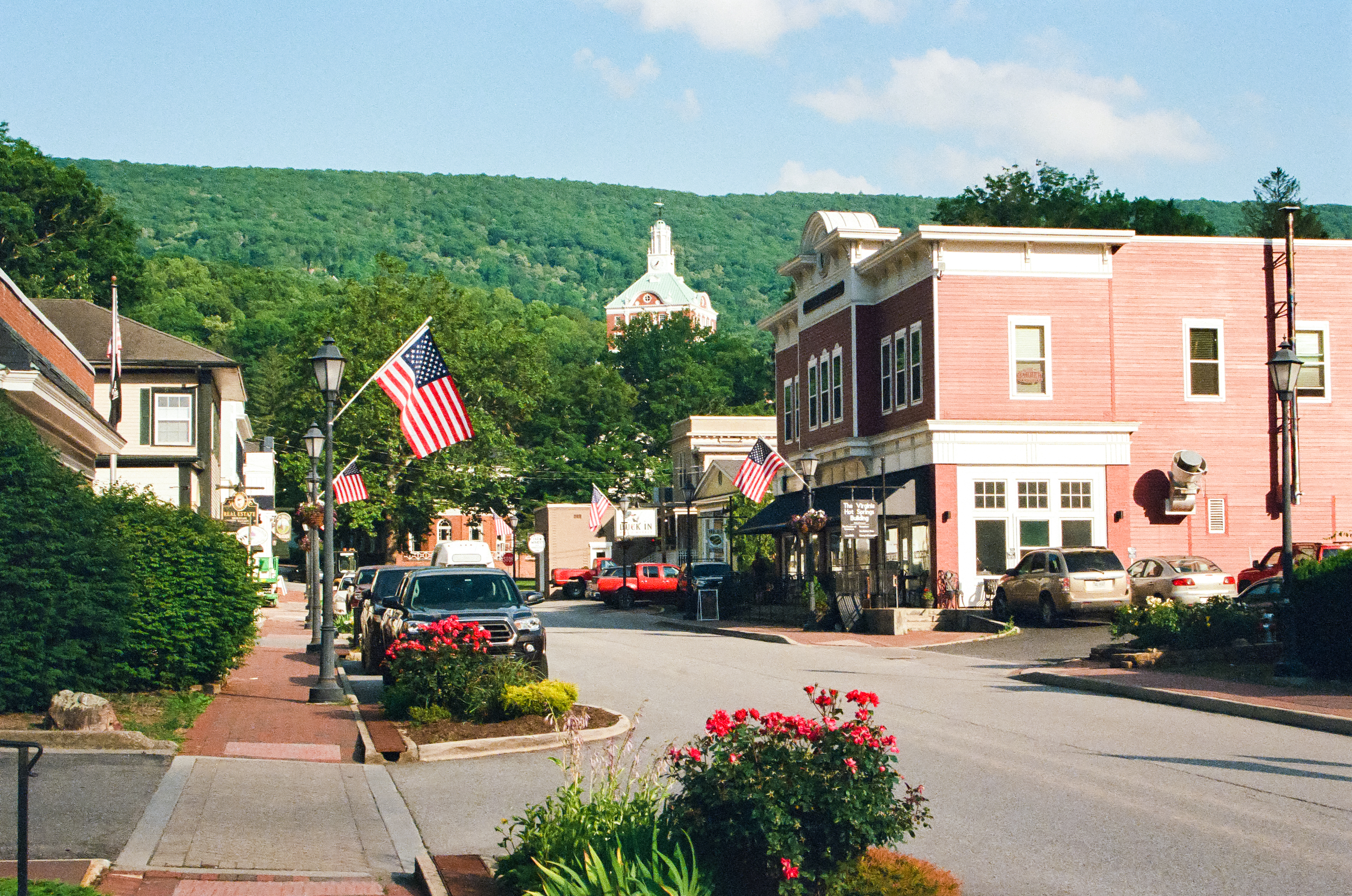
Main Street of the town of Hot Springs, Virginia

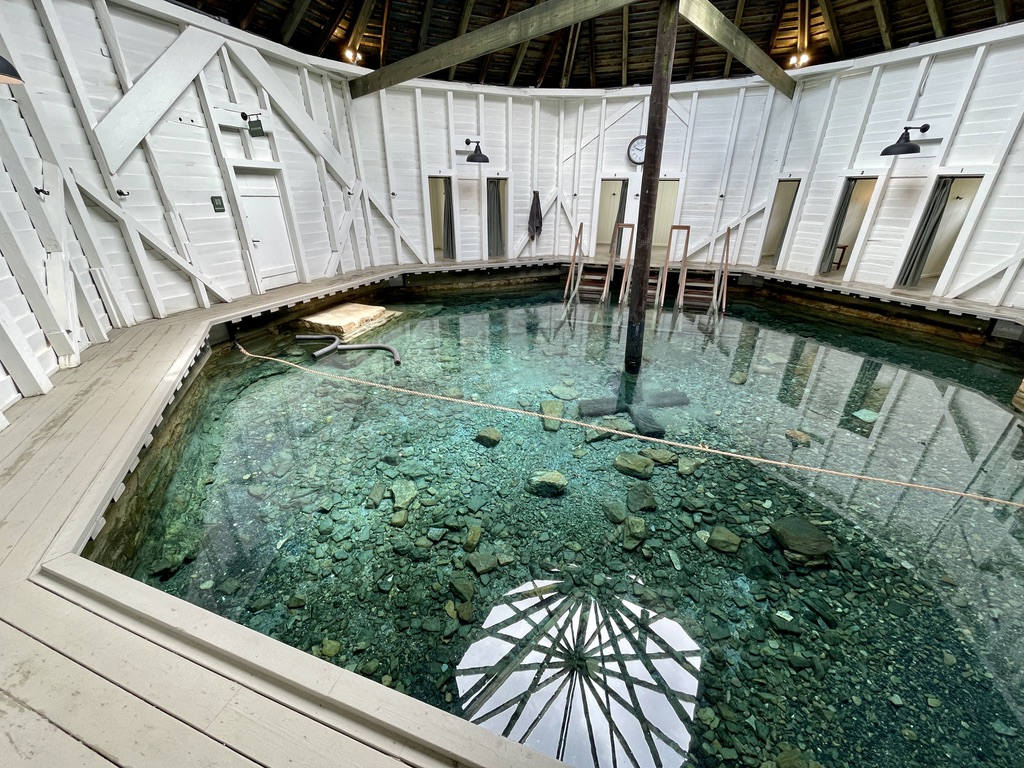
The Warm Springs Pools, historic geothermal pools that are the namesake of Bath County.

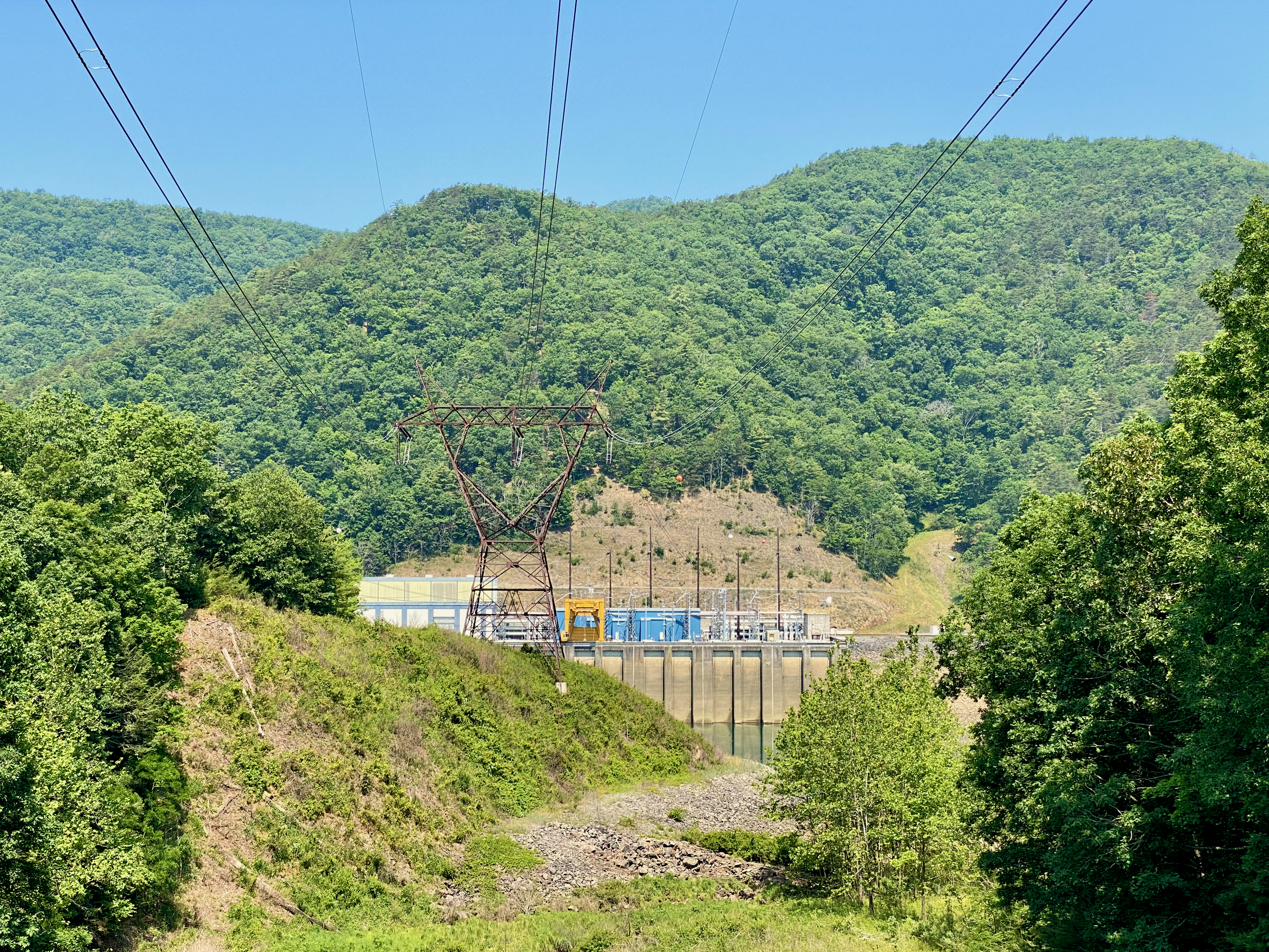
Bath County Pumped Storage Station is a hydroelectric dam system operated by Dominion Energy and FirstEnergy

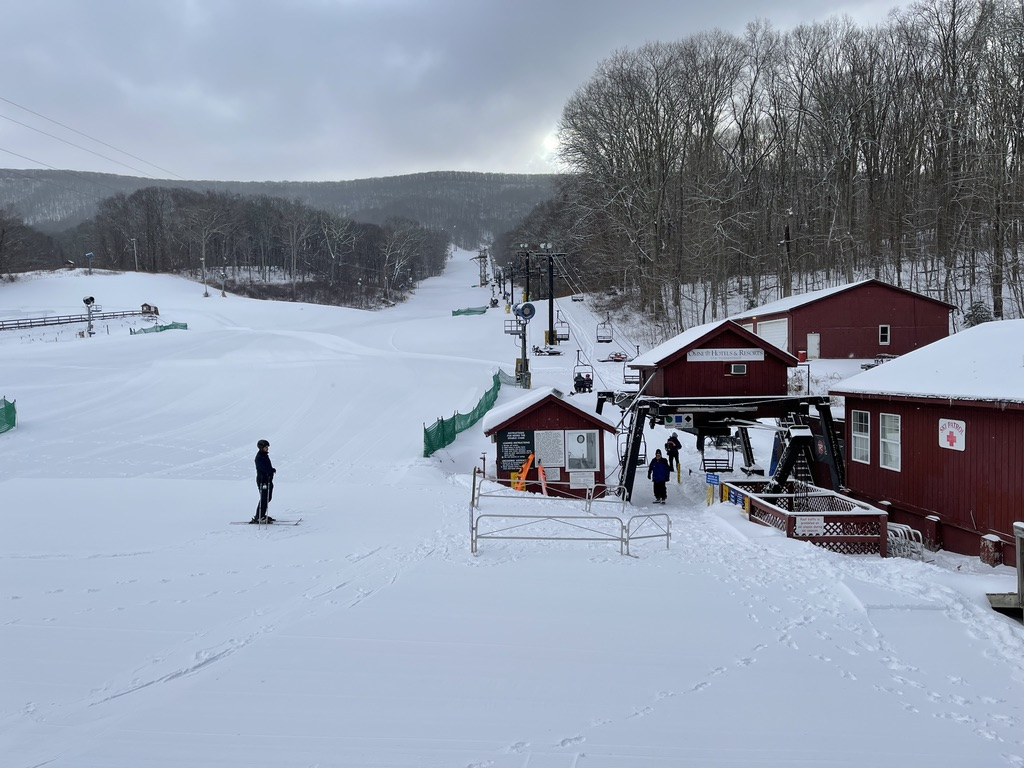
The Homestead ski slopes, located on the side of Warm Springs Mountain

== See also ==
- National Register of Historic Places listings in Bath County, Virginia
