= Hempstead =

Hempstead may refer to:

== Places ==
=== England ===
- Hempstead, Essex
- Hempstead, Kent
- Hempstead, near Holt, Norfolk
- Hempstead, near Stalham, Norfolk
- Hemel Hempstead, Hertfordshire

=== United States ===
- Hempstead, New York (disambiguation), multiple places in New York named Hempstead
- Hempstead, Texas
- Hempstead County, Arkansas
- Hempstead High School (disambiguation), several high schools

== Other uses ==
- USS Hempstead, the name of more than one proposed United States Navy ship

== People with the surname ==
- Barbara L. Hempstead, American hematologist, neuroscientist, and academic administrator
- Charles S. Hempstead (1794–1874), American businessman, lawyer, and mayor
- Edward Hempstead (1780–1817), American lawyer and pioneer
- Harry Hempstead (1868–1938), American owner of the New York Giants from 1912 to 1919
- Hessley Hempstead (1972–2021), American football player
- Isaac William Hempstead (Isaac Hempstead Wright, born 1999), English actor
- Stephen P. Hempstead (1812–1883), American politician

== See also ==
- Heemstede, North Holland
- Hempsted, Gloucester, England
- Hemsted Park, Kent, England – historically sometimes known as Hempsted Park
- Hamstead (disambiguation)
- Hampstead (disambiguation)
- Homestead (disambiguation)
