= Warm Springs Mountain =

Prominent ridge in Bath County, Virginia, US, within the Appalachian Mountain range

Coordinates: 38°02′32″N 79°46′22″W

Warm Springs Mountain is a prominent ridge located in Bath County, Virginia, within the Appalachian Mountain range. Renowned for its ecological significance and natural beauty, the mountain forms part of the larger Allegheny Mountains and is notable for its rich biodiversity and historical relevance in relation to the Omni Homestead Resort in Hot Springs, Virginia, which operates an alpine skiing experience on the mountain's western slope. Rising to a crest elevation of approximately 3,800 feet, Warm Springs Mountain is among the highest peaks in the region, offering sweeping views of the surrounding valleys and forests.

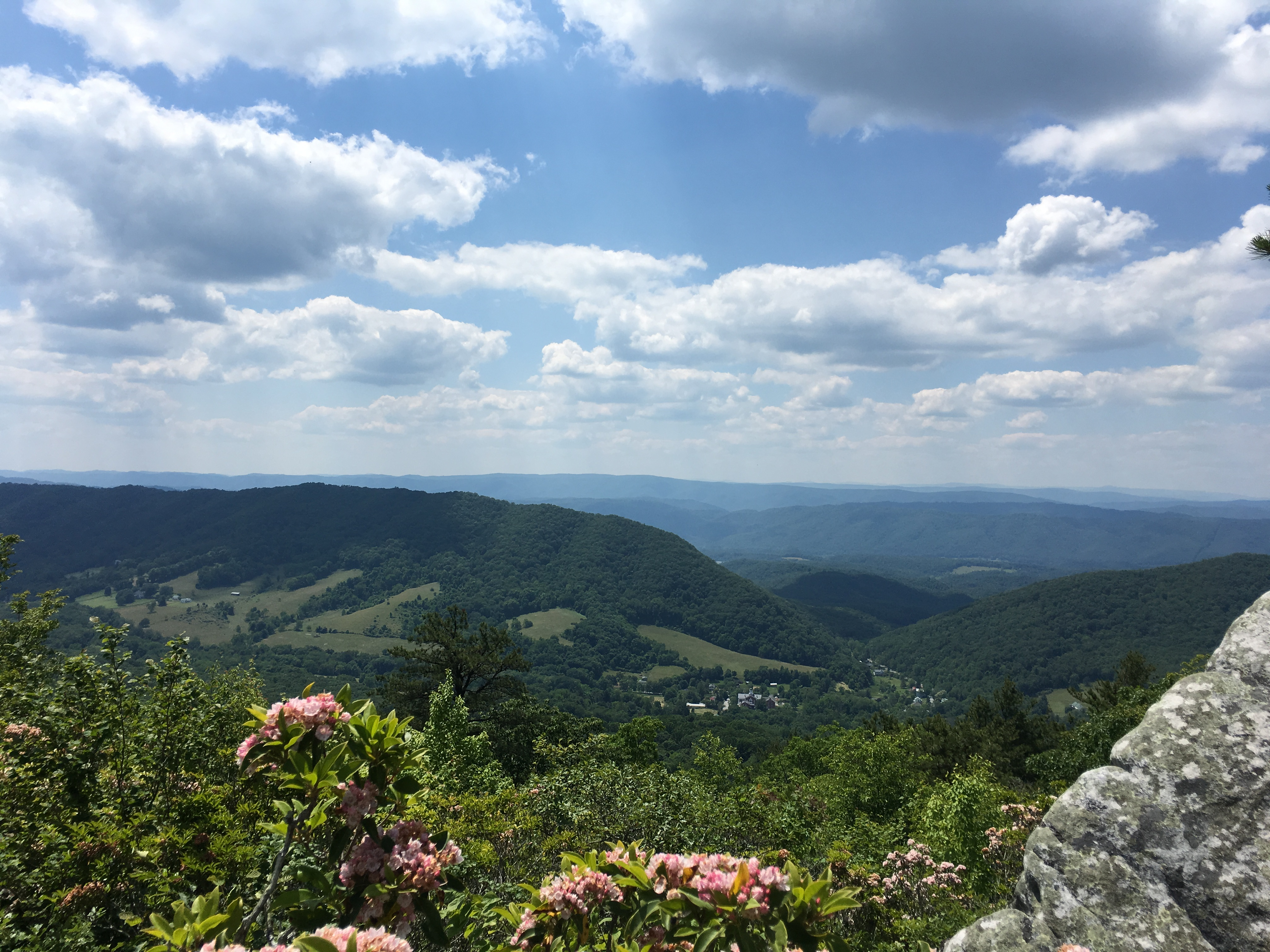
View from atop Warm Springs Mountain, Virginia

== Geography and Topography ==
Warm Springs Mountain extends for roughly 15 miles and serves as a natural divide between the Jackson River and Cowpasture River watersheds. The mountain's rugged terrain consists of steep slopes, narrow ridges, and dense hardwood forests, with mixed oak and hickory dominating its landscape. Several streams and springs, including the namesake Warm Springs Pools, fed by a 98 °F (37 °C) geothermal mineral spring, originate on the mountain. These pools contribute to the area's reputation as a hydrological and recreational haven. Three primary hiking trails follow the ridge line, including the Bear Loop Trail, Flag Rock Trial and Ingalls Overlook Trail.

== Ecological significance ==
The mountain is home to a diverse range of flora and fauna, making it a hotspot for biodiversity within the Appalachians. It is home to a globally significant, fire-dependent montane pine barren ecosystem. Rare animal species such as the Potomac sculpin, roughhead shiner, Cheat Mountain salamander, and Catocala herodias underwing moth can be found in its unique upland ecosystems. Additionally, rare plant species on the mountain include Millboro leatherflower, and the endangered shale barren rockcress. Warm Springs Mountain also serves as a critical migratory corridor for birds, with its dense forests providing habitat for species like the cerulean warbler and black-throated blue warbler.

== Conservation ==
Warm Springs Mountain is a critical site for conservation due to its ecological richness and its role in maintaining the environmental integrity of the Appalachian region. The Nature Conservancy maintains the 9,000 acre Warm Springs Mountain Preserve over a central portion of the mountain, which connects large tracts of the George Washington and Jefferson National Forest and Douthat State Park. Conservation efforts on Warm Springs Mountain focus on preserving its forests, protecting rare and endangered species, and restoring degraded habitats. Controlled burns are occasionally conducted to mimic natural fire cycles, which help maintain the health of the mountain's ecosystems by promoting forest regeneration and reducing invasive species. Additionally, efforts to monitor water quality ensure that the mountain's numerous springs and streams continue to provide clean water for local communities and wildlife. Warm Springs Mountain is also an integral part of the Allegheny Highlands, a region targeted for large-scale conservation initiatives to address climate change and habitat fragmentation.

== Cultural and historical context ==
Warm Springs Mountain has long been an integral part of the region's history and culture. Native American tribes, such as the Shawnee, used the warm mineral springs at the base of the mountain for healing purposes. In the 18th and 19th centuries, the area became a popular destination for European settlers seeking the therapeutic properties of the springs. The nearby town of Warm Springs remains a testament to this legacy, with historical landmarks such as the Warm Springs Pools, which were frequented by figures such as Thomas Jefferson.
