= Hampstead (disambiguation) =

Hampstead is an area of London.

Hampstead or Hampstead Town may also refer to:

== Places ==
=== In Canada ===
- Hampstead, Quebec
- Hampstead, New Brunswick
  - Hampstead Parish, New Brunswick

=== In Dominica ===
- Hampstead, Dominica

=== In New Zealand ===
- Hampstead, New Zealand, a suburb in the town of Ashburton in the Canterbury Region

=== In the United States ===
- Hampstead, Maryland, a town in Carroll County
- Hampstead, New Hampshire, a town in Rockingham County
- Hampstead (Jerusalem, New York), a historic home
- Hampstead, North Carolina, an unincorporated community in Pender County
- Hampstead (Tunstall, Virginia), a historic plantation house in New Kent County
- Ramapo, New York, formerly known as New Hempstead and then Hampstead

== Other ==
- Hampstead (London County Council constituency), a former constituency (1889–1965)
- Hampstead (UK Parliament constituency), a former constituency (1885–1983)
- Metropolitan Borough of Hampstead, a former local government district in London (1900–1965)
- Hampstead School, a secondary school in the London Borough of Camden
- Hampstead tube station, a London Underground station
- Hampstead Town (ward), an electoral ward of the London Borough of Camden
- Hampstead (computer game), a satirical text adventure released by Melbourne House
- Hampstead (film), a British drama film, 2017
- "Hampstead", a song by Ariana Grande from Eternal Sunshine Deluxe: Brighter Days Ahead, 2025

== See also ==
- Hamstead (disambiguation)
- Hempstead (disambiguation)
- Homestead (disambiguation)
- South Hampstead
- West Hampstead
