= Harner =

Harner is a surname. Notable people with the surname include:

- Jason Butler Harner (born 1970), American actor
- Joseph Gabriel Harner (1889–1958), United States Navy sailor and Medal of Honor recipient
- Michael Harner (1929–2018), American animist

== See also ==
- Harner Homestead, historic house in West Virginia, United States
