= Old Homestead =

Old Homestead may refer to:

- The Old Homestead (play), an 1886 play by Denman Thompson
  - The Old Homestead (1915 film), based on the play
  - The Old Homestead (1922 film), based on the play
  - The Old Homestead (1935 film), based on the play
- The Old Homestead (1942 film), an American comedy film
- The Old Homestead, an 1855 novel by Ann S. Stephens adapted for the stage by George Aiken
- Old Homestead Records, a country and bluegrass music record label
- Old Homestead Steakhouse, the oldest continuously operating steakhouse in the United States

== Named places ==
=== Australia ===
- Old Homestead Cave, a cave on the Nullarbor Plain in Western Australia

=== United States ===
(by state)

- Old Homestead, Southgate, Michigan
- Old Homestead (Aberdeen, Mississippi), listed on the NRHP in Mississippi
- Wood Old Homestead, Rio Grande, Ohio, listed on the NRHP in Ohio
- Old Homestead (Enon Valley, Pennsylvania), listed on the NRHP in Pennsylvania
- Harner Homestead, near Morgantown, West Virginia, also known as the Old Harner Homestead

== See also ==
- Old (disambiguation)
- Homestead (disambiguation)
