= Hamstead =

Hamstead may refer to:

- Hamstead, Isle of Wight
- Hamstead, West Midlands
  - Hamstead Colliery
  - Hamstead railway station
- Hamstead Marshall, Berkshire, England
  - Hamstead Lock, on the Kennet and Avon Canal

== See also ==
- Hampstead (disambiguation)
- Hempstead (disambiguation)
- Homestead (disambiguation)
