= Homestead =

Homestead may refer to:

- Homestead (building), a farmhouse and its adjacent outbuildings; by extension, it can mean any small cluster of houses
- Nguni homestead, a cluster of houses inhabited by a single extended family, typically with a kraal attached
- Homestead (unit), a unit of measurement equal to 160 acres
- Homestead principle, a legal concept that one can establish ownership of unowned property through living on it
- Homestead Acts, several United States federal laws that gave millions of acres to farmers known as homesteaders
- Homestead exemption (U.S. law), a legal program to protect the value of a residence from expenses and/or forced sale arising from the death of a spouse
- Homesteading, a lifestyle of agrarian self-sufficiency as practiced by a modern homesteader or urban homesteader

== Named places ==
=== Australia ===
- Homestead, Queensland, a town and locality in the Charters Towers Region
- The Homestead (Georges Hall, NSW), historical house
- "The Homestead" resort at El Questro Wilderness Park

=== United Kingdom ===
- The Homestead, Sandiway, a house in Cheshire, England, now called Redwalls

=== United States ===
- The Homestead (Flagstaff, Arizona), on the National Register of Historic Places listings in Coconino County, Arizona
- Homestead, Kern County, California
- Homestead, Florida

- Homestead Air Reserve Base, a U.S. Air Force base near Miami, Florida
- Homestead–Miami Speedway, an auto racing track in Homestead, Florida

- The Homestead (Evanston, Illinois), on the National Register of Historic Places listings in Evanston, Illinois
- Homestead, Iowa
- Homestead Temporary Shelter for Unaccompanied Children, in Florida
- Homestead Township, Otter Tail County, Minnesota
- Homestead, Michigan, an unincorporated community
- Homestead, Missouri
- Homestead, New Mexico
- The Homestead (Haverstraw, New York), listed on the NRHP in Rockland County, New York
- The Homestead (Geneseo, New York), NRHP-listed, a historic house in Livingston County, New York
- The Homestead (Saranac Lake, New York), listed on the NRHP in Franklin County, New York
- The Homestead (Waccabuc, New York), listed on the NRHP in Westchester County, New York
- The Homestead at Denison University, a student-run intentional community in Granville, Ohio
- Homestead, Oklahoma
- Homestead, Oregon
- Homestead, Portland, Oregon
- Homestead, Pennsylvania
- Homestead, Wisconsin
- Homestead Township, Michigan
- The Homestead (Hot Springs, Virginia), a luxury resort and a National Historic Landmark listed on the NRHP in Bath County, Virginia
- Homestead High School (disambiguation), the name of several high schools in the United States
- Homestead Temporary Shelter for Unaccompanied Children, a migrant children's detention shelter in Florida

== Arts and media ==
- "Homestead" (Star Trek: Voyager), a 2001 episode of Star Trek: Voyager
- Homestead, a 1998 novel by American writer Rosina Lippi
- The Homestead, an artwork by John Steuart Curry
- Homestead Records, a record label founded in 1983 and based in New York City
- Homestead Records (1920s), an American record company of the 1920s
- Homestead, fictional planetary migration company, Passengers
- Homestead (film), a 2024 American post-apocalyptic drama film

== Other uses ==
- Homestead (meteorite), a meteorite that fell in Homestead, Iowa in 1875
- Homestead Strike, an 1892 labor confrontation at the Carnegie Steel Company in Homestead, Pennsylvania
- Homestead Technologies, a web-hosting service based in Burlington, Massachusetts

== See also ==
- Old Homestead (disambiguation)
- The Homesteads (disambiguation)
