= Hempstead, New York (disambiguation) =

Hempstead is the name of some places in the U.S. state of New York:

== Municipalities ==
- Hempstead (village), New York, an incorporated village within the Town of Hempstead
- Hempstead, New York, a town that encompasses the Village of Hempstead
- Hempstead Plains, central Long Island in Nassau County
- New Hempstead, New York, a village in the town of Ramapo
- North Hempstead, New York, a town in Nassau County
- Ramapo, New York, formerly known as New Hempstead and then Hampstead
- South Hempstead, New York, a hamlet in Nassau County
- West Hempstead, New York, a hamlet in Nassau County

== Other uses ==
- Hempstead Branch, an electrified rail line operated by the Long Island Rail Road

== See also ==
- Hempstead High School (disambiguation)
