= Three Hills (Warm Springs, Virginia) =

Historic house in Virginia, United States

- U.S. National Register of Historic Places
- Virginia Landmarks Register
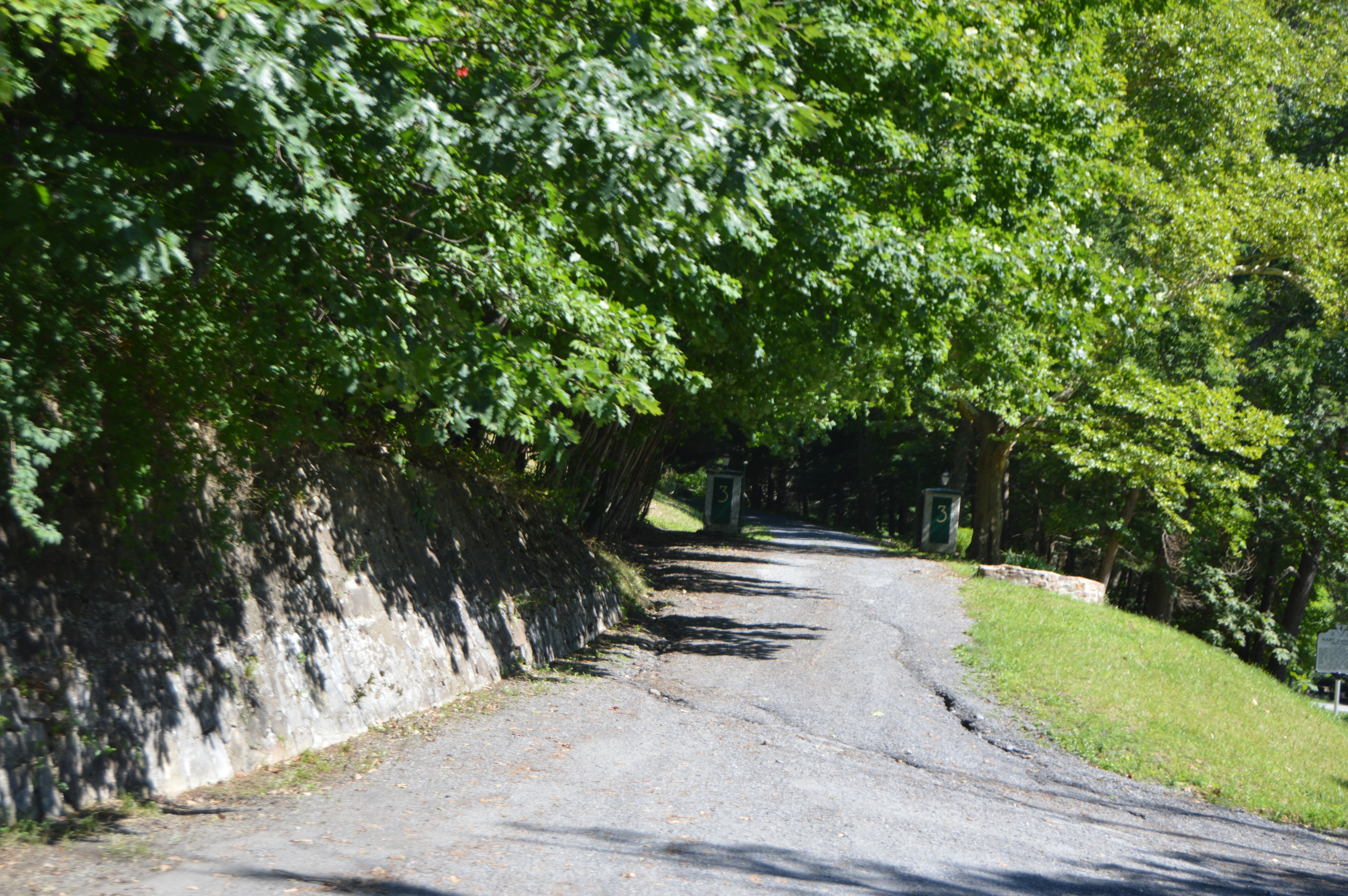
- Entrance to Three Hills

- Location within Virginia Location within the United States
- Location: 348 Three Hills Lane, near Warm Springs, Virginia
- Coordinates: 38°02′44″N 79°46′57″W
- Area: 27.24 acres (11.02 ha)
- Built: 1913
- Architect: Carneal and Johnston
- Architectural style: Italian Renaissance, Colonial Revival
- NRHP reference No.: 13000986
- VLR No.: 008-0050

Significant dates
- Added to NRHP: December 24, 2013
- Designated VLR: September 19, 2013

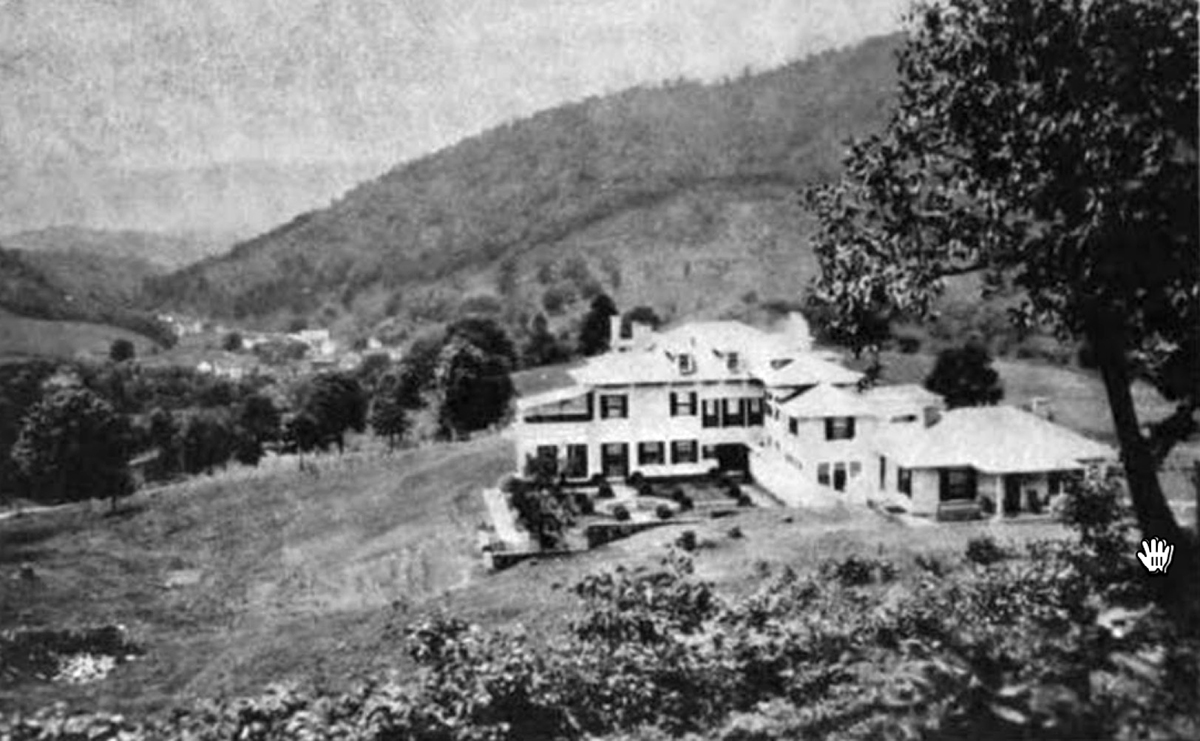
Three Hills, home of novelist Mary Johnston, Warm Springs, Virginia, c. 1915.

Three Hills is a historic estate located near Warm Springs, Virginia, in Bath County, Virginia. Built in 1913, it is a 2 1/2-story frame and stucco residence designed in the Italian Renaissance style, with a Colonial Revival interior. The property was constructed as the home of American novelist and women's rights advocate Mary Johnston (1870–1936), who lived there until her death. Three Hills was listed on the National Register of Historic Places in 2013 for its architectural significance and for its association with Johnston, a nationally prominent literary and political figure.

== History ==
Three Hills was commissioned by Mary Johnston in 1913 and served as her primary residence for more than two decades. Johnston lived at the property during the most productive period of her literary career and remained there until her death in 1936. Financial pressures led her to operate the house as an inn and to take in boarders beginning in the late 1910s. The property continued to be associated with hospitality use in subsequent decades.

== Architecture and landscape ==
The house was designed by the Richmond architectural firm Carneal and Johnston. Its exterior reflects Italian Renaissance influences, while the interior incorporates Colonial Revival elements. The dwelling consists of a central block flanked by two-story wings, with rear additions and a single-story, flat-roofed portico on the front façade. The estate includes several contributing resources, including a small formal boxwood garden, three one-story frame and stucco cottages, and a freestanding stone and brick chimney. The property encompasses approximately 27.24 acres.

== Mary Johnston ==
Mary Johnston was among the most commercially successful American novelists of the early twentieth century. Her historical romance To Have and to Hold (1900) was the bestselling novel in the United States that year, and she went on to publish numerous additional works of fiction. Historians have described Johnston as the first best-selling novelist of the twentieth century. Many of her later novels were written while she resided at Three Hills.

=== Women's suffrage activism ===
In addition to her literary career, Johnston was an active advocate for women's rights. She was a founding member of the Equal Suffrage League of Virginia and served in leadership roles within the organization during the 1910s. Johnston wrote and spoke publicly in support of women's suffrage, and contemporary suffrage publications identified Three Hills as her residence during this period. Her political activism contributed to her national reputation as a leading voice for social reform.

== National Register listing ==
Three Hills was added to the National Register of Historic Places on December 24, 2013. The nomination recognized the property under criteria for both architectural significance and its association with Mary Johnston, whose contributions to American literature and the women's suffrage movement were of national importance.

== Additional reading ==
- "Three Hills: The Home of Mary Johnston". Virginia Suffrage News. Library of Virginia. November 1, 1914.
