= Homestead Dairy Barns =

- U.S. National Register of Historic Places
- U.S. Historic district
- Virginia Landmarks Register
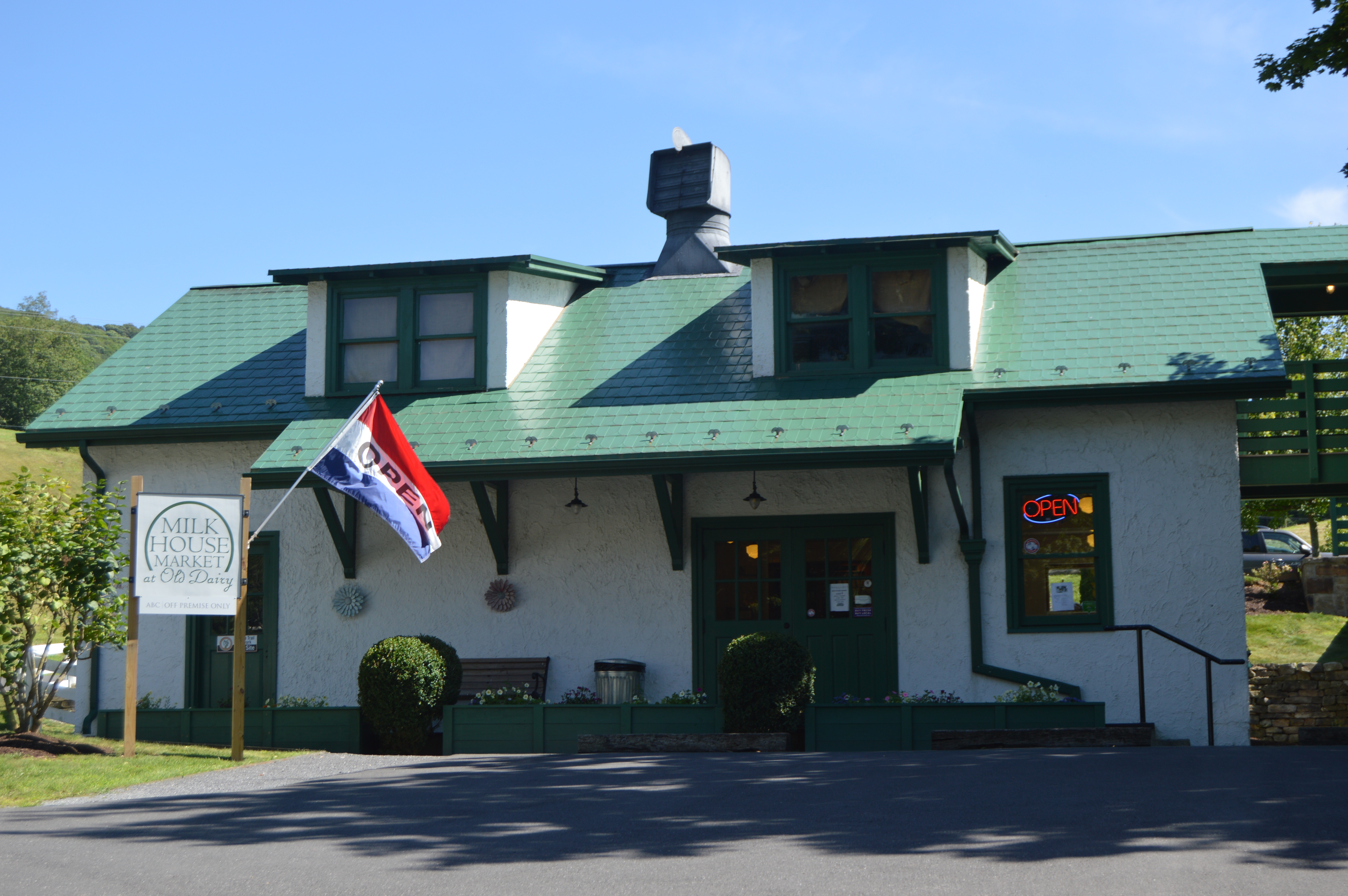
- Bottling building

- Location within Virginia Location within the United States
- Location: U.S. Route 220 north of Warm Springs, Virginia
- Coordinates: 38°3′2″N 79°46′59″W
- Area: 12.4 acres (5.0 ha)
- Built: 1928
- Built by: Virginia Hot Springs Co.
- Architectural style: Colonial Revival, Bungalow/craftsman
- NRHP reference No.: 07000051
- VLR No.: 008-5026

Significant dates
- Added to NRHP: February 13, 2007
- Designated VLR: September 6, 2006

Homestead Dairy Barns, also known as Miller Mill and Inn at Gristmill Square, is a historic dairy barn complex and national historic district located at Warm Springs, Bath County, Virginia, USA. The district encompasses seven contributing buildings. The complex consists of the Main Barn with its attached tile double silos, a Bottling Building, Milking Barn, Calving Barn, Ham House, Herdsman's Cottage, and Bull Barn. The complex was built by the Virginia Hot Springs Company in 1928 to support the operations of the nearby Homestead resort. They are frame buildings, many of which are clad in stucco and painted white with unifying green trim. They include repetition of Colonial Revival and Craftsman details throughout.

It was listed on the National Register of Historic Places in 2007.
