= 1967 U.S. Women's Open =

Coordinates: 37.998°N 79.83°W

Tournament information
- Dates: June 29 – July 2, 1967
- Location: Hot Springs, Virginia
- Courses: The Homestead, Cascades Course
- Organized by: USGA
- Tour: LPGA Tour
- Format: Stroke play – 72 holes

Statistics
- Par: 71
- Length: 6,191 yards (5,661 m)
- Field: 94 players, 42 after cut
- Cut: 159 (+17)
- Prize fund: $25,000
- Winner's share: ($5,000)

Champion
- (France) Catherine Lacoste (a)
- 294 (+10)

Location in the United States
Location in Virginia

The 1967 U.S. Women's Open was the 22nd U.S. Women's Open, held June 29 to July 2 at the Cascades Course of The Homestead, in Hot Springs, Virginia.

This winner was Catherine Lacoste, age 22, the first international and youngest champion at the time and the only amateur to ever win the title. She held a five-stroke lead after 36 and 54 holes, and despite a final round 79, held on for a two-stroke victory margin over runners-up Susie Maxwell and Beth Stone. It was also the first win by an amateur on the LPGA Tour.

Defending champion Sandra Spuzich finished fifteen strokes back, tied for 27th place.

== Final leaderboard ==
Sunday, July 2, 1967

Place	Player	Score	To par	Money ($)
1	(France) Catherine Lacoste (a)	71-70-74-79=294	+10	0
T2	(United States) Susie Maxwell	71-75-76-74=296	+12	3,600
T2	(United States) Beth Stone	75-76-71-74=296	+12	3,600
T4	(United States) Sandra Haynie	70-79-77-71=297	+13	1,033
T4	(United States) Murle Lindstrom	75-74-73-75=297	+13	1,033
T4	(United States) Louise Suggs	76-74-74-73=297	+13	1,033
7	(Australia) Margie Masters	73-73-74-80=300	+16	750
T8	(United States) Clifford Ann Creed	75-75-76-75=301	+17	630
T8	(United States) Marilynn Smith	75-77-72-77=301	+17	630
T8	(United States) Sharon Miller	76-80-74-71=301	+17	630
