= The Homesteads =

The Homesteads may refer to:

== Places ==
- The Homesteads, Texas, an unincorporated community in Texas, United States of America
- The Homesteads, Essex, a housing estate and ward in Essex, England

== See also ==
- Homestead (disambiguation)
