= USS Hempstead =

USS Hempstead has been the name of more than one United States Navy ship, and may refer to:

- USS Hempstead (AVP-43), a proposed seaplane tender that was cancelled in 1943 prior to construction
- USS Hempstead (APA-241), a proposed attack transport that was cancelled in 1947 prior to construction
