= The Homestead (Evanston, Illinois) =

- U.S. National Register of Historic Places
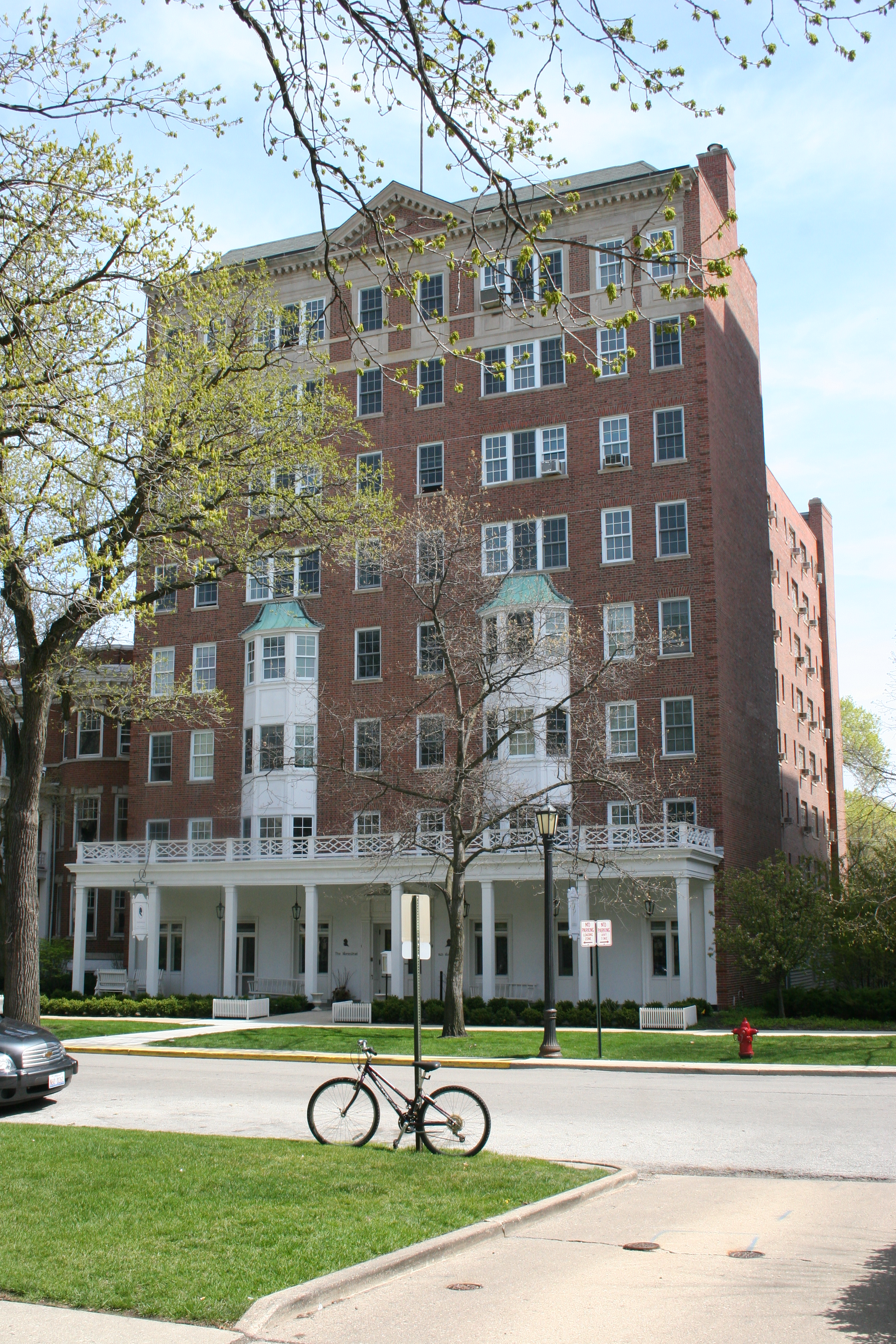
- Location: 1625 Hinman Ave., Evanston, Illinois
- Coordinates: 42°02′48″N 87°40′38″W
- Area: less than one acre
- Built: 1928
- Architect: Philip Arthur Danielson
- Architectural style: Colonial Revival
- NRHP reference No.: 05001607
- Added to NRHP: February 1, 2006

The Homestead is a historic apartment hotel at 1625 Hinman Avenue in Evanston, Illinois. Opened in 1928, it was one of several apartment hotels built in Evanston in the 1920s. Popular in the early twentieth century, apartment hotels housed a mixture of short-term and long-term guests; they were frequently used by workers who did not wish or could not afford to live near their workplace full-time. Architect Philip Arthur Danielson designed the building in the Colonial Revival style, which was used on many other apartments from the era in Evanston. The design includes a verandah supported by Doric columns along the front facade, two projecting three-bay windows, brick quoins, and a dentillated cornice with a pediment.

The building was added to the National Register of Historic Places on February 1, 2006.
