= Homestead High School =

Homestead High School or Homestead Senior High School is the name of several high schools in the United States:

- Homestead High School (California)
- Homestead Senior High School (Florida)
- Homestead High School (Homestead, Pennsylvania), alma mater of American disc jockey Mary Dee and singer Betty Davis
- Homestead High School (Indiana)
- Homestead High School (Wisconsin)
