= Warm Springs Pools =

- Warm Springs Bathhouses
- U.S. National Register of Historic Places
- Virginia Landmarks Register
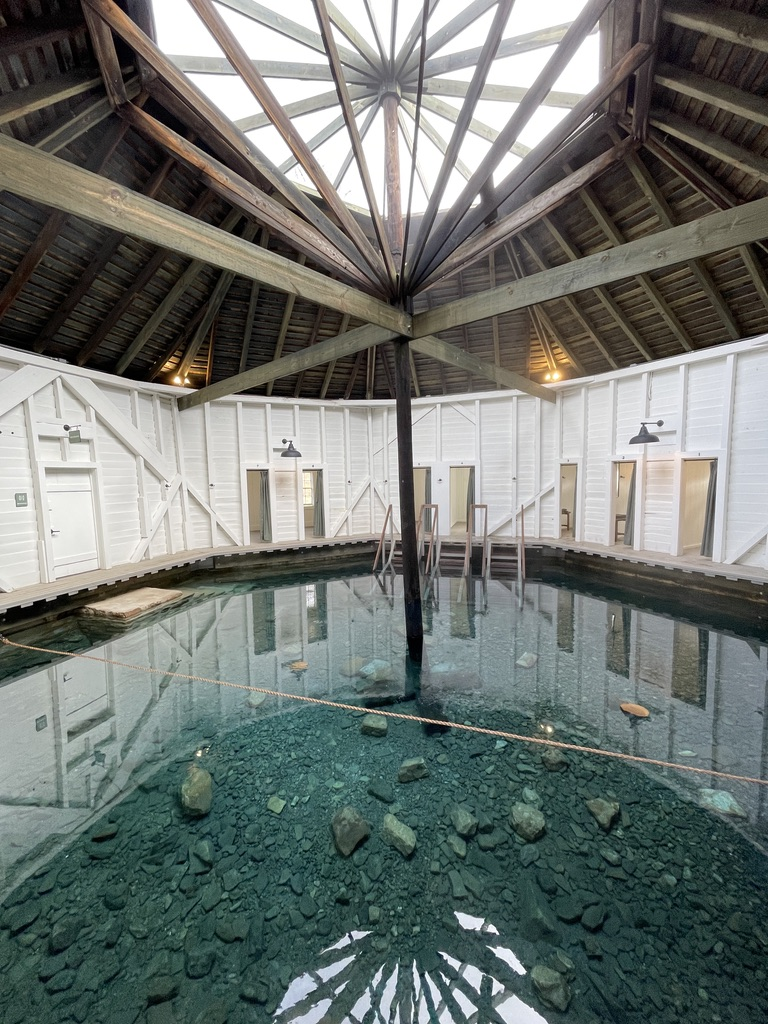
- Interior of the Gentlemen's Pool House

- Location within Virginia Location within the United States
- Location: NE of Warm Springs off Rt. 220, Warm Springs, Virginia
- Coordinates: 38°3′13″N 79°46′51″W
- Area: less than one acre
- Built: 1761
- NRHP reference No.: 69000222 (original); 100004302 (increase)
- VLR No.: 008-0007

Significant dates
- Added to NRHP: October 08, 1969
- Boundary increase: August 20, 2019
- Designated VLR: November 5, 1968

The Warm Springs Pools are historic spa structures in the town of Warm Springs, Virginia. The name was changed in the 20th century from "Warm Spring Pools" to "Jefferson Pools" before being returned to its original name in 2021. The spa is part of The Homestead, a resort hotel in nearby Hot Springs.

The spas are naturally fed by a 98 °F (37 °C) mineral spring. The men's spa holds 40,000 US gallons (150,000 L) of constantly flowing water. In total, the springs in Warm Springs have a flow rate of 1,700,000 gallons of water per day. The water naturally contains minerals including magnesium sulfate, iron, silica, boron, barium, manganese, and lithium.

Currently, guests can book one-hour soak sessions in the pools. Omni Hotels offers family sessions where all ages, including children are welcome, or adult co-ed soaks for ages 16 and up. Keeping with tradition, there are also clothing-optional soaking times available, when the pools are separated by sex.

== History ==
The Gentlemen's Pool House is the oldest European-style spa structure in the United States. The octagon-shaped foundation was built in 1761. The wooden structure on top of the pool was first constructed in the 1820s. The Ladies' Pool House was built in 1836, and is a 22-sided structure. The buildings have changed little over the years, except for the 2021 rehabilitation of the pools.

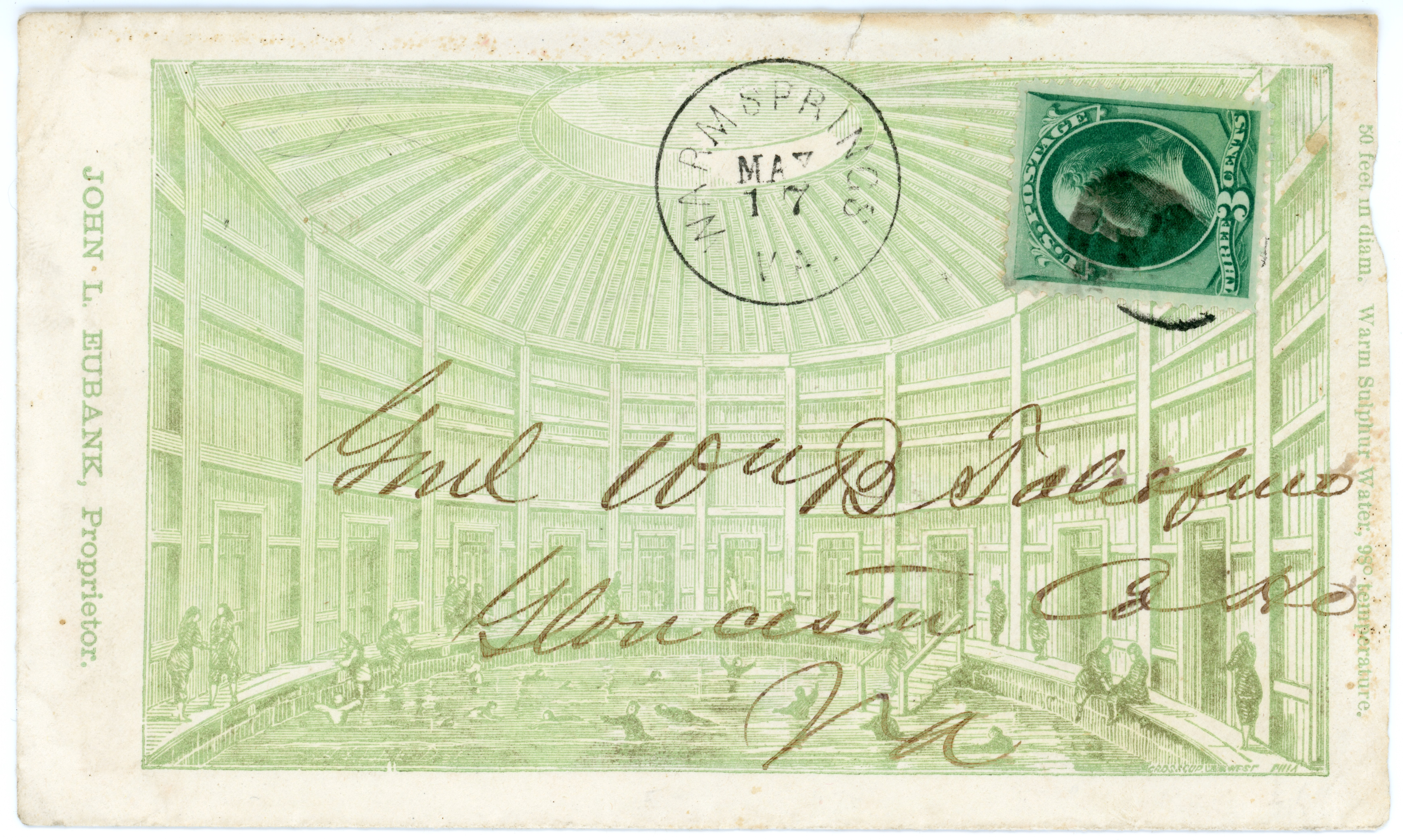
Advertising cover depicting the Ladies' Pool. John L. Eubank, Proprietor.

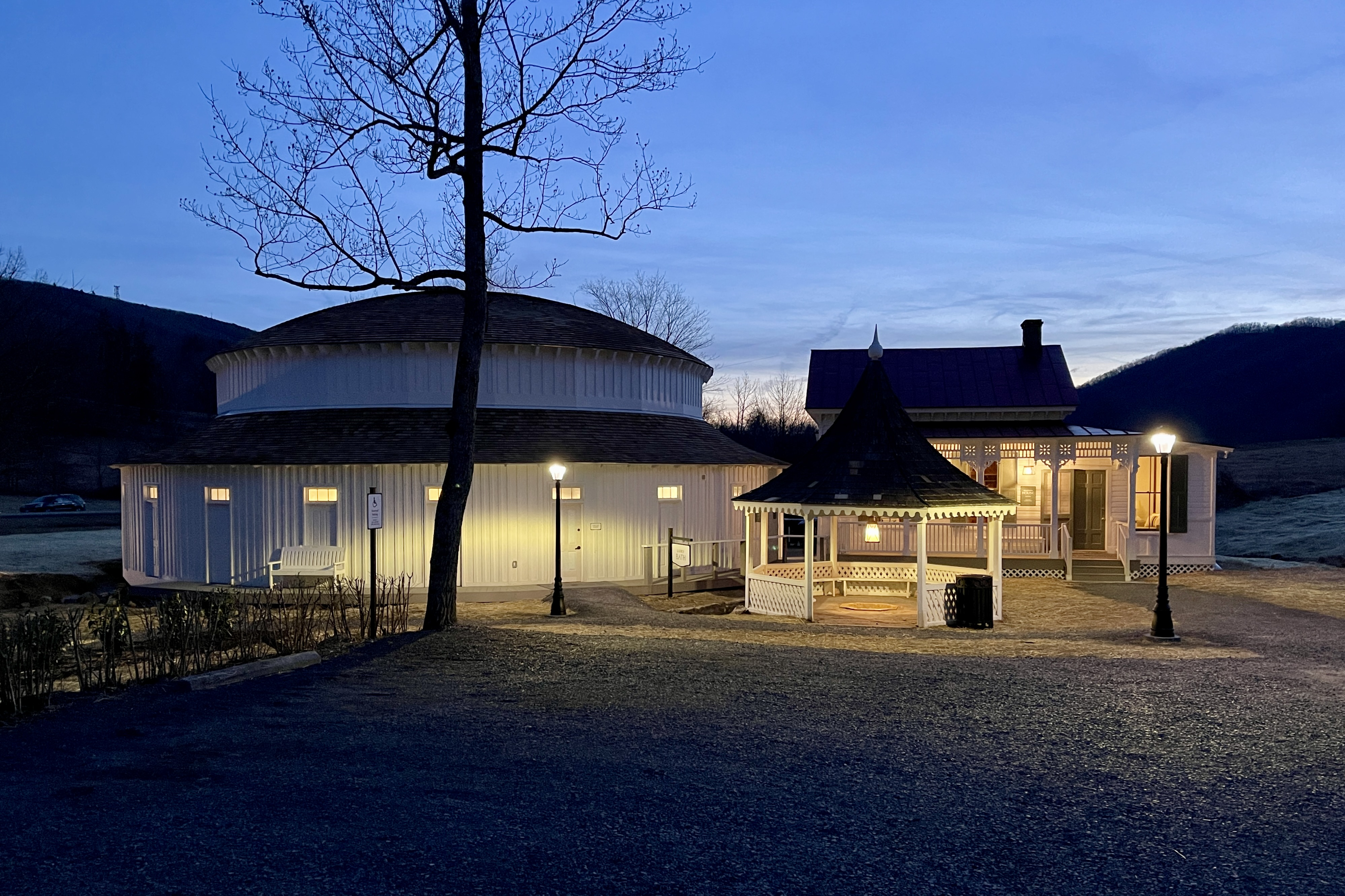
Left to Right: The Ladies' Pool, Drinking Spring, and Reception House

Famous bathers include Thomas Jefferson, who spent three weeks in 1819 bathing three times day and described the waters in a letter to his daughter, Martha Jefferson Randolph, as being of "first merit".

The site was listed as Warm Springs Bathhouses on the Virginia Landmarks Register on November 11, 1968, and the National Register of Historic Places on October 8, 1969.

== 2021 Rehabilitation ==
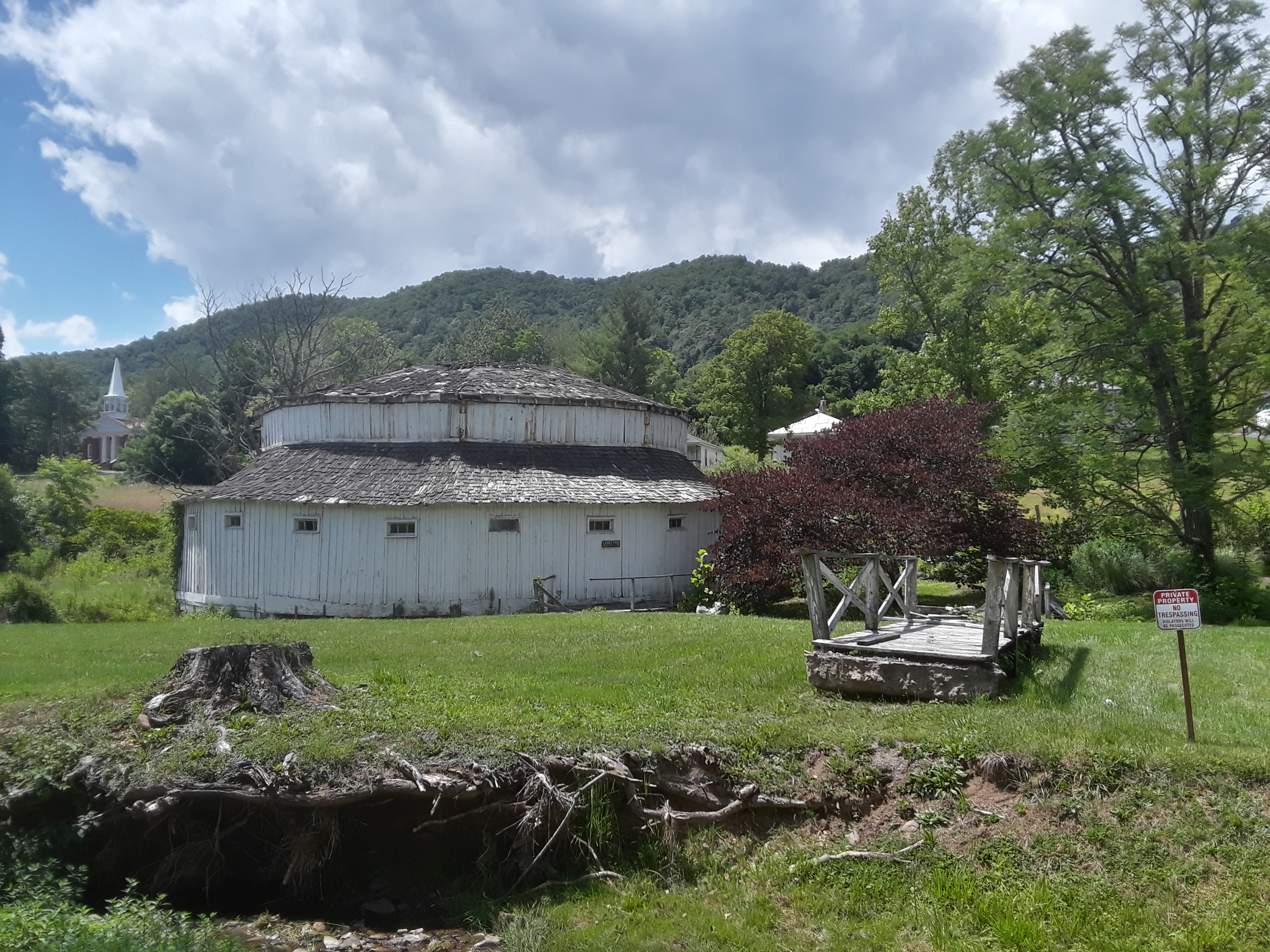
The Ladies' Pool before rehabilitation

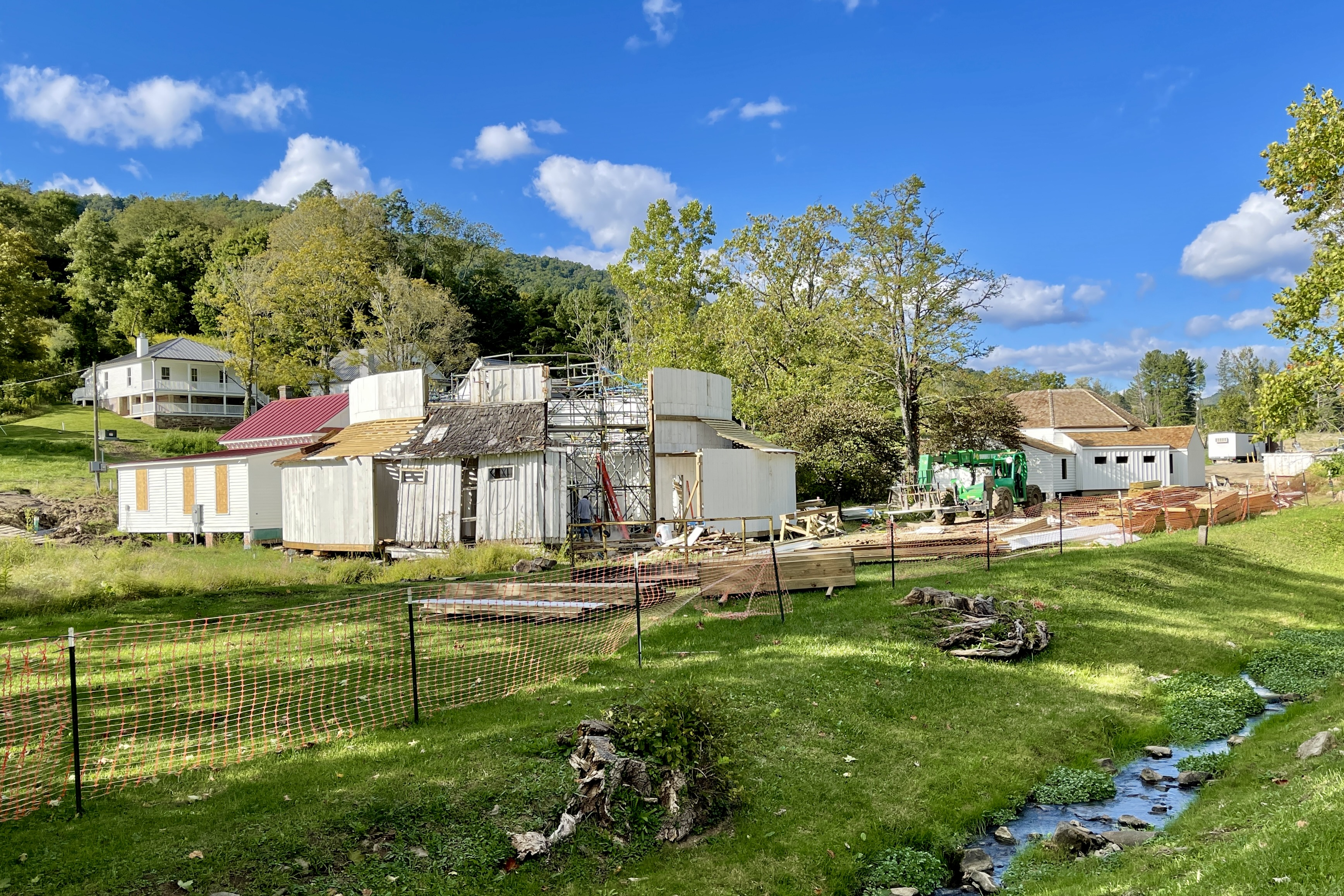
The Warm Springs Pools in the midst of rehabilitation in 2021

The bath houses had slowly fallen into disrepair due to many decades of use and exposure of the untreated wood to steam and mineral water. The buildings were ordered closed by Bath County in October 2017 due to their becoming a safety hazard. The owner, The Omni Homestead Resort, announced the rehabilitation of the Warm Springs Pools. Work began on the rehabilitation of the Warm Springs Pools in 2021, partnering with 3North Architects and Lionberger Construction. The rehabilitation follows the requirements of the Pools' historic site registrations. Blueprints of the new design are based on photographs and documents on the structures as the bath houses appeared in 1925. The pools reopened in December 2022 following their rehabilitation.
