= The Omni Homestead Resort =

Historic resort in Virginia, US

- The Homestead
- U.S. National Register of Historic Places
- U.S. National Historic Landmark
- Virginia Landmarks Register
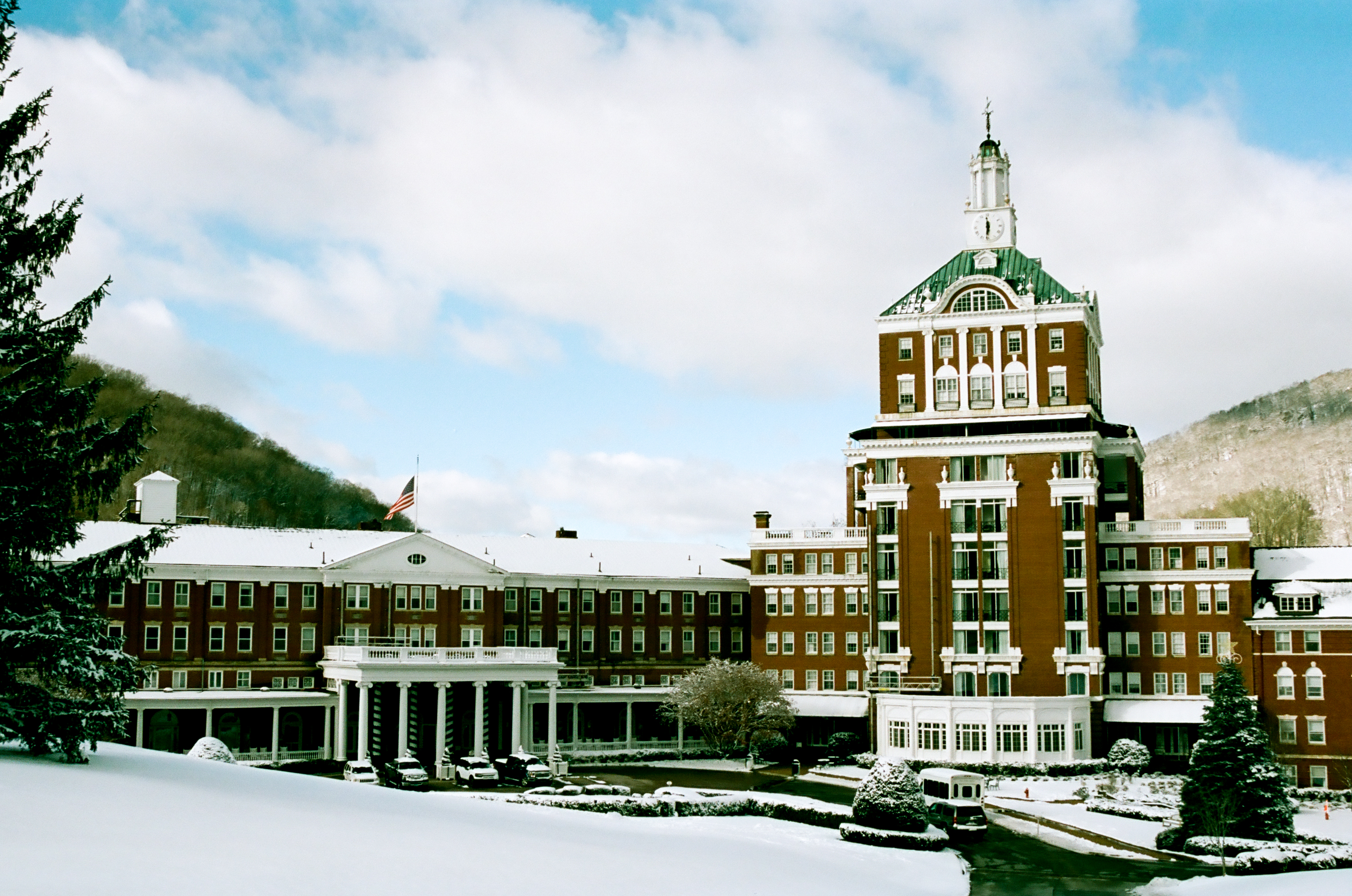
- Front view of The Homestead Resort

- Location within Virginia
- Location: US 220, Hot Springs, Virginia
- Coordinates: 37°59′43.70″N 79°49′46.72″W
- Area: 2,300 acres (930 ha)
- Built: 1892
- Architect: Multiple
- Architectural style: Queen Anne, Greek Revival, Colonial Revival
- NRHP reference No.: 84003494
- VLR No.: 008-0025

Significant dates
- Added to NRHP: May 3, 1984
- Designated NHL: July 17, 1991
- Designated VLR: March 20, 1984

The Omni Homestead Resort is a luxury resort in Hot Springs, Virginia, United States, in the middle of the Allegheny Mountains. The area has the largest hot springs in the Commonwealth, and the resort is also known for its championship golf courses, which have hosted several national tournaments. The resort also includes an alpine ski resort; founded in 1959, it is the oldest in Virginia. The resort has been designated a National Historic Landmark; it has a history extending more than two and a half centuries. The Omni Homestead Resort is a member of Historic Hotels of America the official program of the National Trust for Historic Preservation.

== History ==
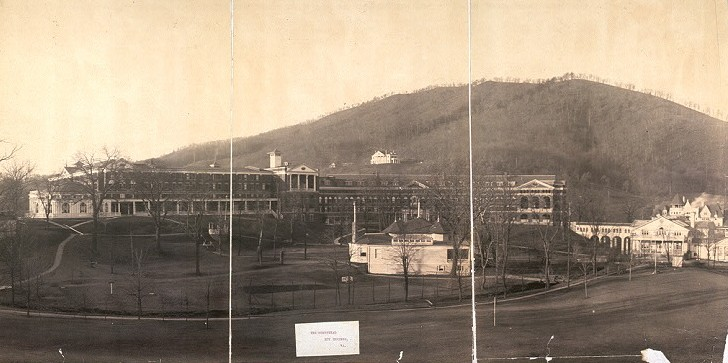
The Homestead in 1903

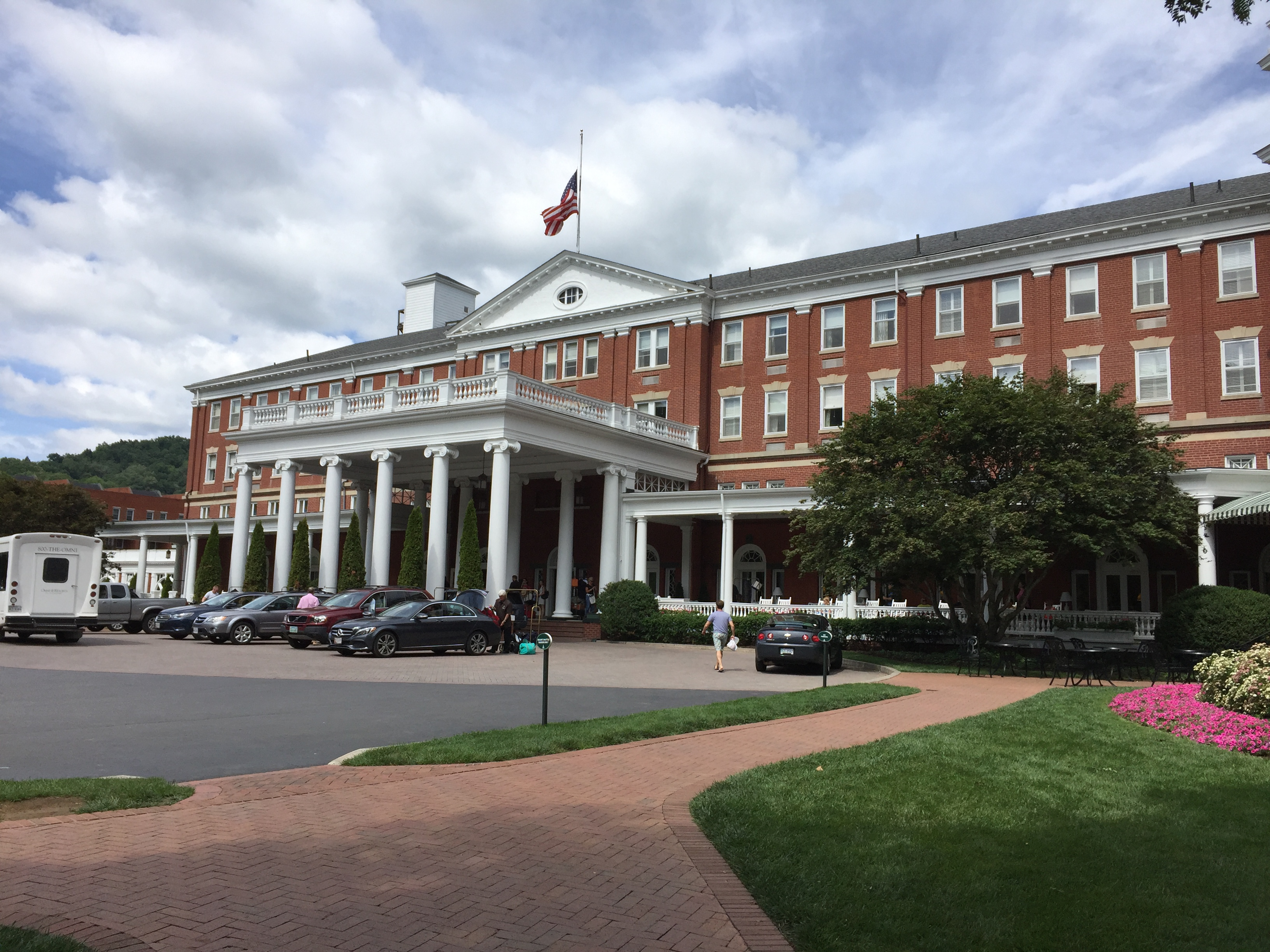
Old wing of the resort in 2016

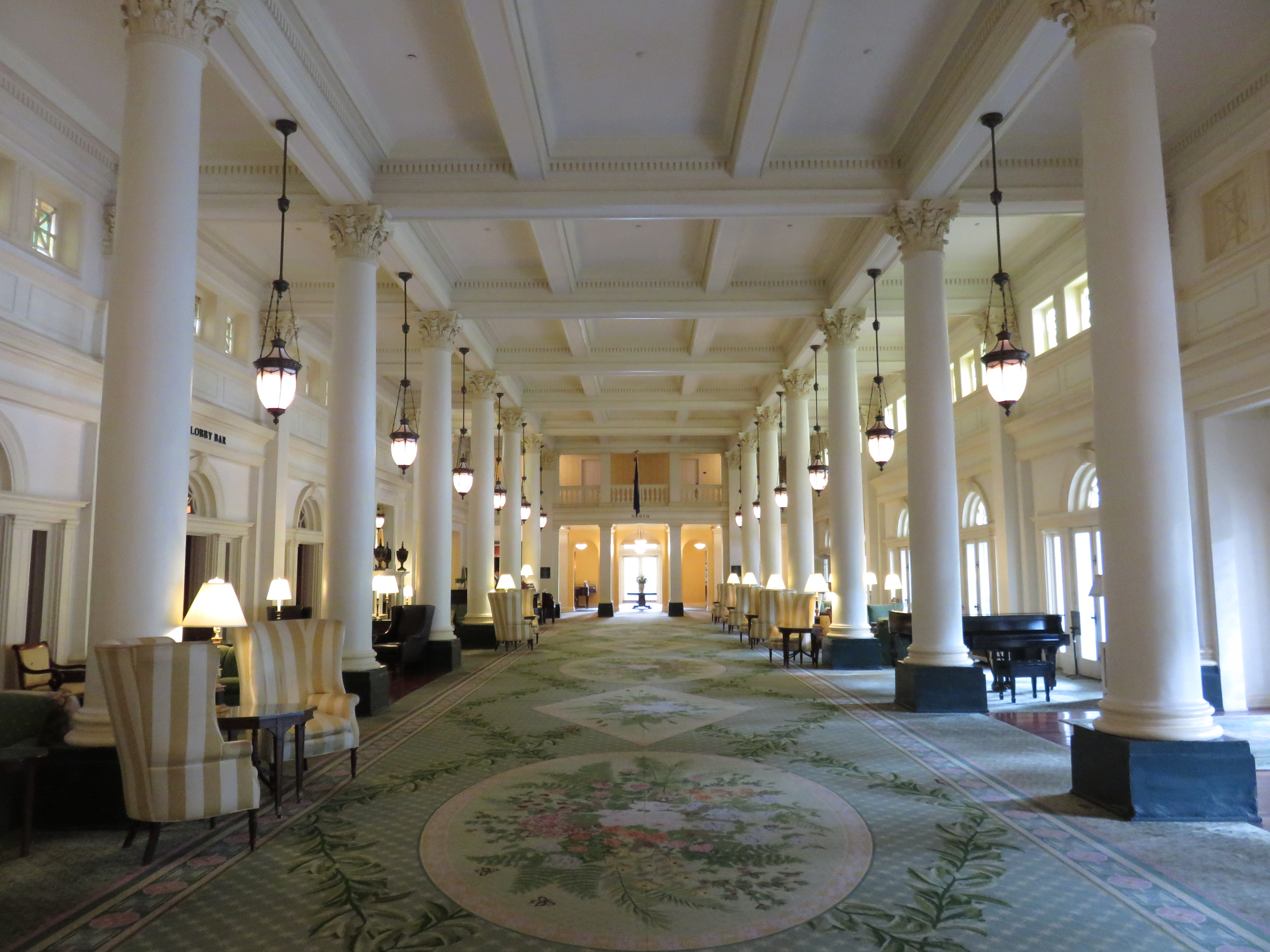
Lobby of the resort in 2016

In 1766, Thomas Bullitt built a lodge on the site, which is considered the founding of The Homestead. It has hosted vacationers ever since, including twenty-three U.S. presidents.

The modern resort dates from 1888–1892, when a group of investors headed by J. P. Morgan bought the business and started rebuilding it from the ground up. The original hotel buildings burned down in 1901, caused by a fire in the bakery. The main Homestead hotel was constructed afterwards, one wing a year, with the main lobby reconstructed in 1902.

Many American Presidents and influential people were Homestead guests. William Howard Taft spent July and August 1908 at the Homestead, working and relaxing before the final campaign push, as did outgoing President Theodore Roosevelt, for a short period of time. Other notable guests included cartoonist Carl E. Schultze of Foxy Grandpa fame.

From December 1941 until June 1942, following the United States' entry into World War II, the Homestead served as a high-end internment camp for 785 Japanese diplomats and their families until they could be exchanged through neutral channels for their American counterparts. The diplomats were later transferred to the Greenbrier Hotel in West Virginia.

In 1943, during World War II, The Homestead hosted an important conference of the United Nations in which was implemented the foundation of the Food and Agriculture Organization.

In 1993, The Homestead was purchased by Club Resorts, the same company which owned the Pinehurst Resort in North Carolina. In 2006, Club Resorts and its parent company ClubCorp, Inc. were acquired by a private-equity group led by KSL Capital Partners. KSL Resorts assumed management of The Homestead at this time. KSL sold the resort to Omni Hotels in 2013 and it was renamed The Omni Homestead Resort. From October 2021 to October 2023, the entire resort underwent a complete renovation, costing over $150 million.

The Homestead was designated a National Historic Landmark in 1991. Associated with The Homestead are the Homestead Dairy Barns, listed on the National Register of Historic Places in 2007.

== Golf ==
Cascades Course logo

The Homestead features two golf courses. The club is sometimes referred to as Virginia Hot Springs Golf & Tennis Club. The area produced an 82-time winner on the PGA Tour in the late Sam Snead.

The Old Course started as a six-hole layout in 1892, and the first tee is the oldest in continuous use in the United States. It was expanded to 18 holes by 1901, and Donald Ross redesigned it in 1913. The course has been modified at various times since, and the current course has six par 5s and six par 3s.

The Cascades Course is the most famous of the two, and is usually ranked among the top 100 U.S. courses by both Golf Digest and GOLF Magazine. The Cascades is the course used when hosting national tournaments, including seven United States Golf Association championships. It was designed by William S. Flynn (who was also a main architect for Shinnecock Hills), and opened in 1923.

There was formerly a third course, the Lower Cascades, which was designed by Robert Trent Jones Sr. in 1963. It hosted qualifying rounds for the U.S. Amateur tournament. It was closed following the 2012 season.

Famed PGA Tour champion Sam Snead lived in or near Hot Springs all of his life, and served for decades as the Homestead's golf pro. Snead also holds the course record of 60, which he set in 1983 at the age of 71.

=== Tournaments ===
- 1928 U.S. Women's Amateur, won by Glenna Collett
- 1932 National Intercollegiate Championship, won by Yale (team) and Johnny Fischer (individual)
- 1966 Curtis Cup, won by the United States over Great Britain & Ireland 13-5
- 1967 U.S. Women's Open, won by Catherine Lacoste
- 1980 U.S. Senior Amateur, won by William C. Campbell
- 1988 U.S. Amateur, won by Eric Meeks
- 1994 U.S. Women's Amateur, won by Wendy Ward
- 1995 Merrill Lynch Shoot-Out Championship (Senior PGA Tour)
- 1996 Merrill Lynch Shoot-Out Championship (Senior PGA Tour)
- 2000 U.S. Mid-Amateur, won by Greg Puga
- 2004 NCAA Division I Men's Championship, won by California (team) and Ryan Moore (UNLV)(individual)
- 2009 USGA Senior Women's Amateur Championship
- 2023 U.S. Senior Women's Amateur
- 2025 U.S. Senior Women's Amateur

== Spa ==
The Homestead offers spa services to guests including massages, facial treatments, manicures and pedicures, and stays in the Serenity Garden, where guests can soak in pools fed by natural geothermal springs. Also located in the spa is the hotel's fitness center and indoor pool, open to any guests of the resort.

Another location operated by the Homestead is the Warm Springs Pools, geothermal springs housed in historic structures. Guests of the hotel and day guests can book hour-long sessions to soak in the pools. The resort provides shuttle rides from the hotel to Warm Springs.

== Recreation ==
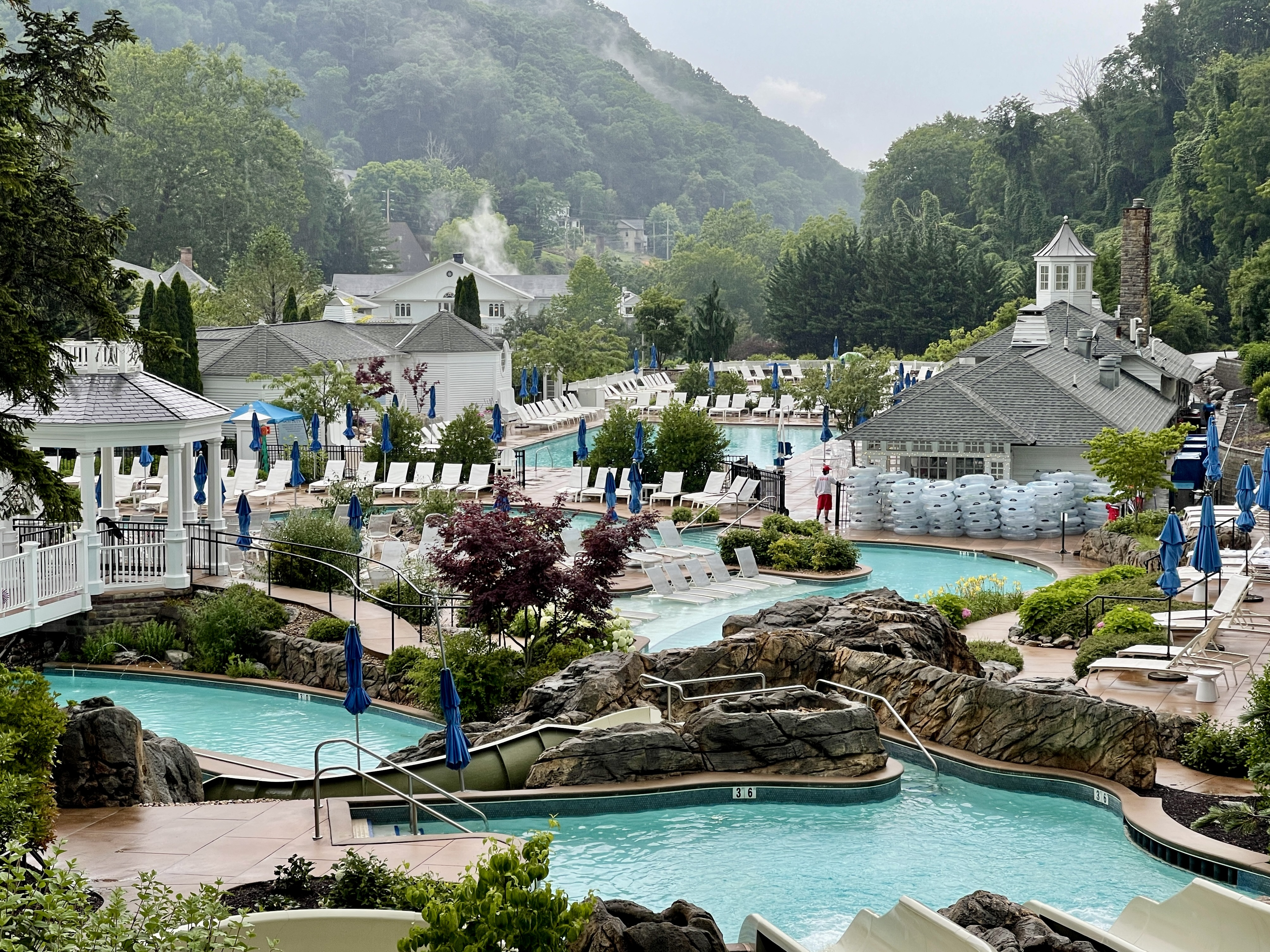
Allegheny Springs water park

The Homestead offers many activities to guests, including a two-acre waterpark with a lazy river and water slides, mini golf, tennis, kayaking, fly fishing, horseback riding, skeet shooting, archery, zip lining, guided hikes, and lawn games.

The resort originally featured an Olympic sized skating rink that closed when the Zamboni became unusable. In 2008, the Homestead built a new 30 X 20 foot ice skating rink in time for the 2008-2009 winter season. In 2013, the ice rink was relocated to Allegheny Springs, adjacent to the outdoor pool.

== Ski resort ==
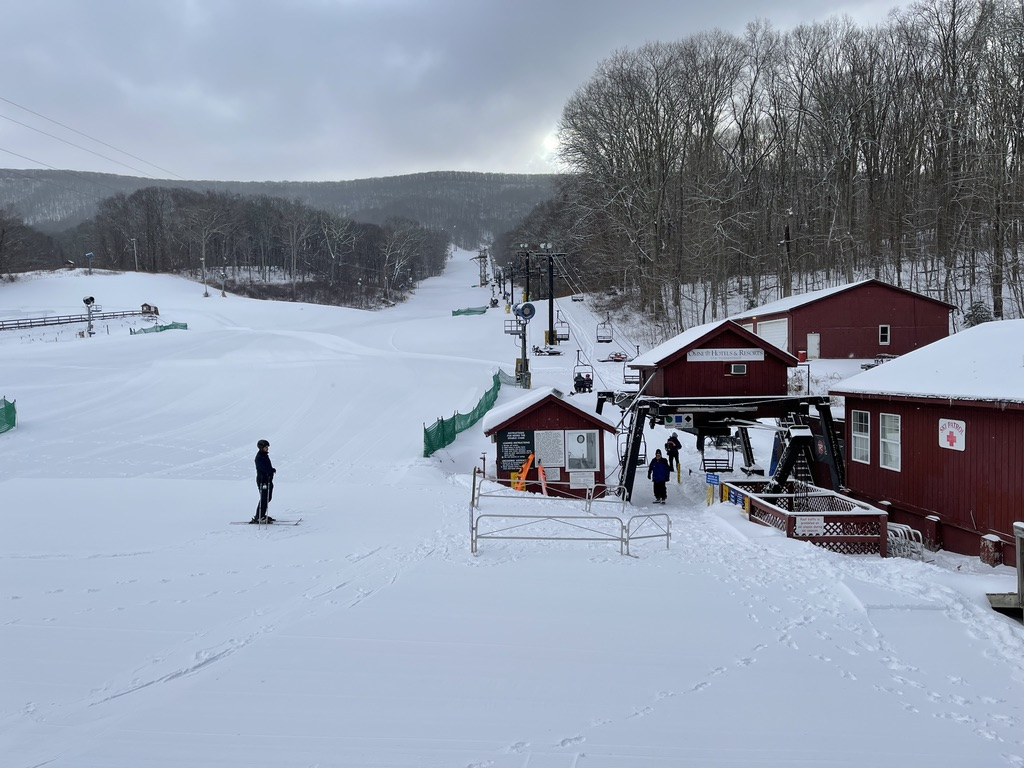
The Homestead Skiing hill

The ski area at The Homestead was opened in 1959; it is the oldest ski resort in Virginia, and was developed by Sepp Kober, known as 'The Father of Southern Skiing'. Natural snowfall on the ski hill is supplemented by snowmaking equipment and groomed by machines for optimal ski and snowboard experience.

The resort's main and only northwest-facing slope is serviced by three lifts, including a double chairlift which accesses the intermediate and advanced terrain at the top of the hill, and two surface lifts which serve the beginner terrain at the bottom and at the tubing hill. The chairlift has a mid-mountain drop-off station which accesses intermediate terrain. The resort offers a variety of other winter activities including snow tubing.

=== Statistics: ===
==== Elevation ====
- Summit Elevation: 3,200 ft (980 m)
- Base Elevation: 2,500 ft (760 m)
- Vertical Rise: 700 feet (210 m)

==== Terrain ====
- Skiable area: 40 acres (0.16 km^{2})
- Runs: 10 total
  - 35% beginner
  - 55% intermediate
  - 10% advanced
- Longest run: 4,200 feet (1,300 m)
- Annual snowfall: 50 inches (1.3 m)

==== Resort capacity ====
- Lift system: 3 lifts total
  - 1 double chairlift
  - 1 rope tows
  - I conveyor
- Uphill lift capacity: 1,143 skiers/hour
- Snowmaking: 100% of trails

== March 2009 shooting ==
On March 21, 2009, two resort employees were shot and killed in the hotel kitchen; the community of Hot Springs was briefly locked down under code red procedures as a security precaution. Authorities identified fellow employee Beacher Ferrel Hackney as a suspect in the killings. The slayings were the first homicides in Bath County since 1983. On September 2, 2012, Hackney's remains, clothing, some personal possessions, and pistol were found near the Homestead's Lower Cascades golf course. The cause of death has not been determined.

== Gallery ==
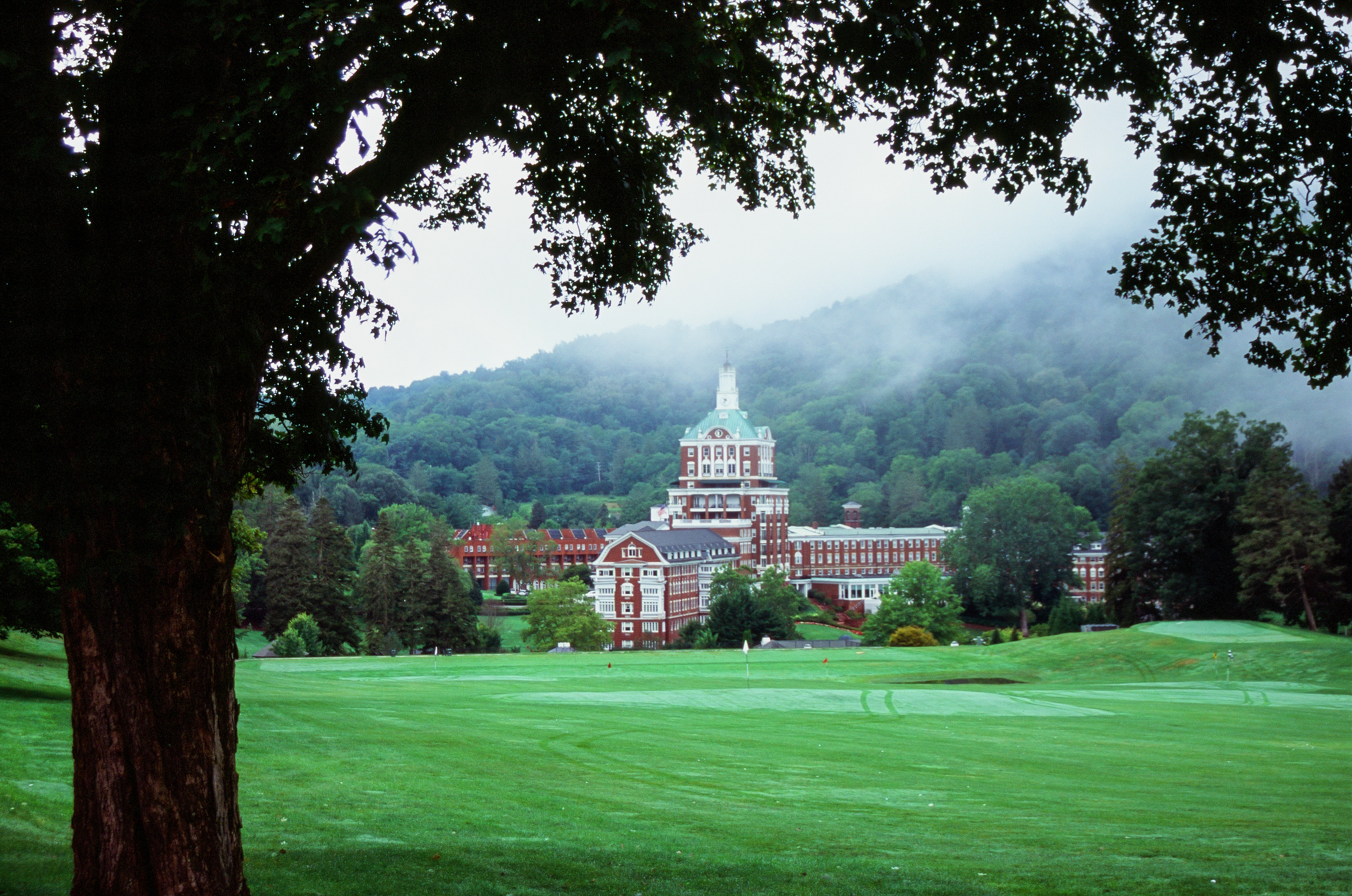
The Homestead as viewed from one of its golf courses, the Old Course

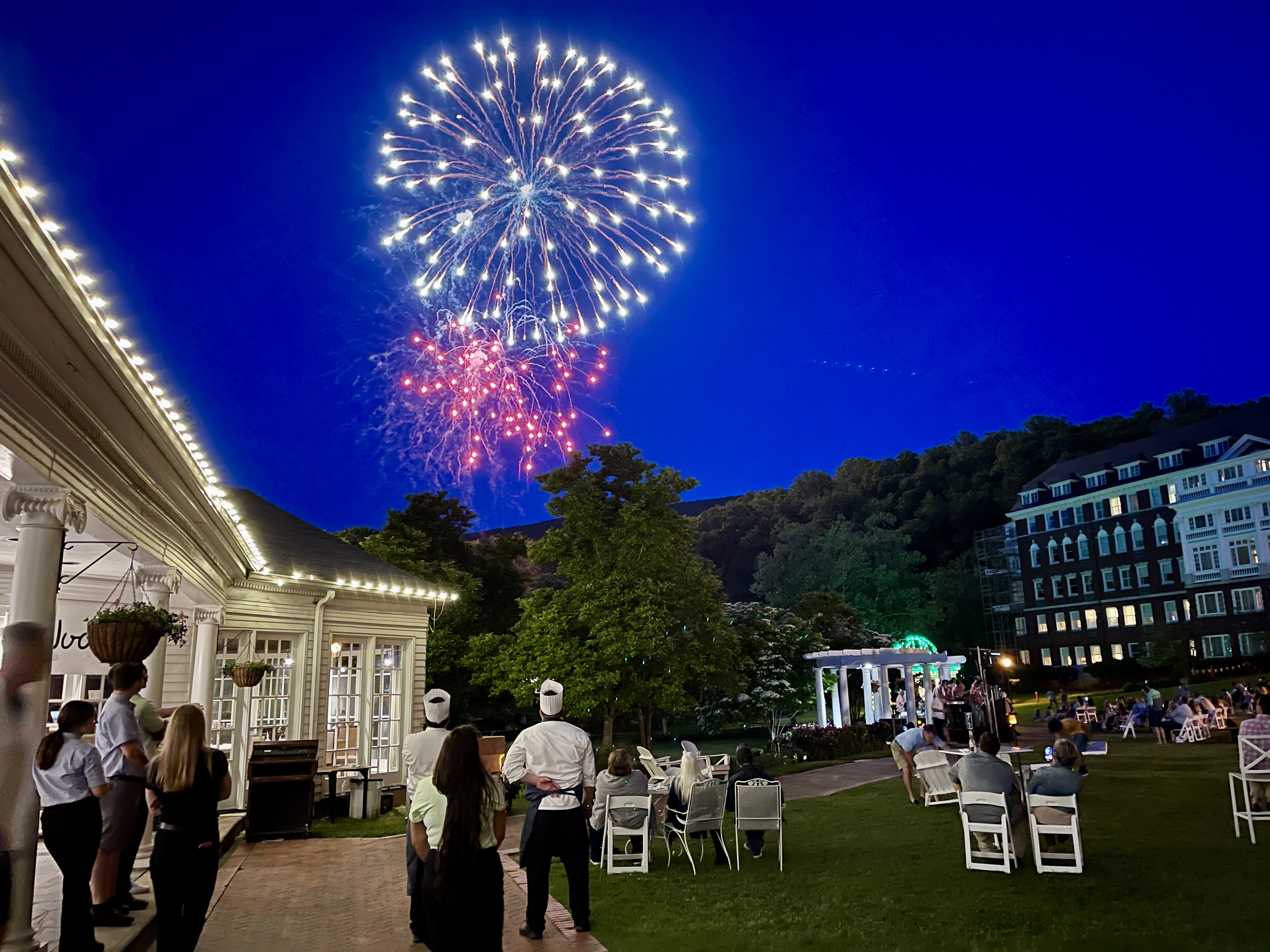
Fireworks on the lawn to celebrate memorial day

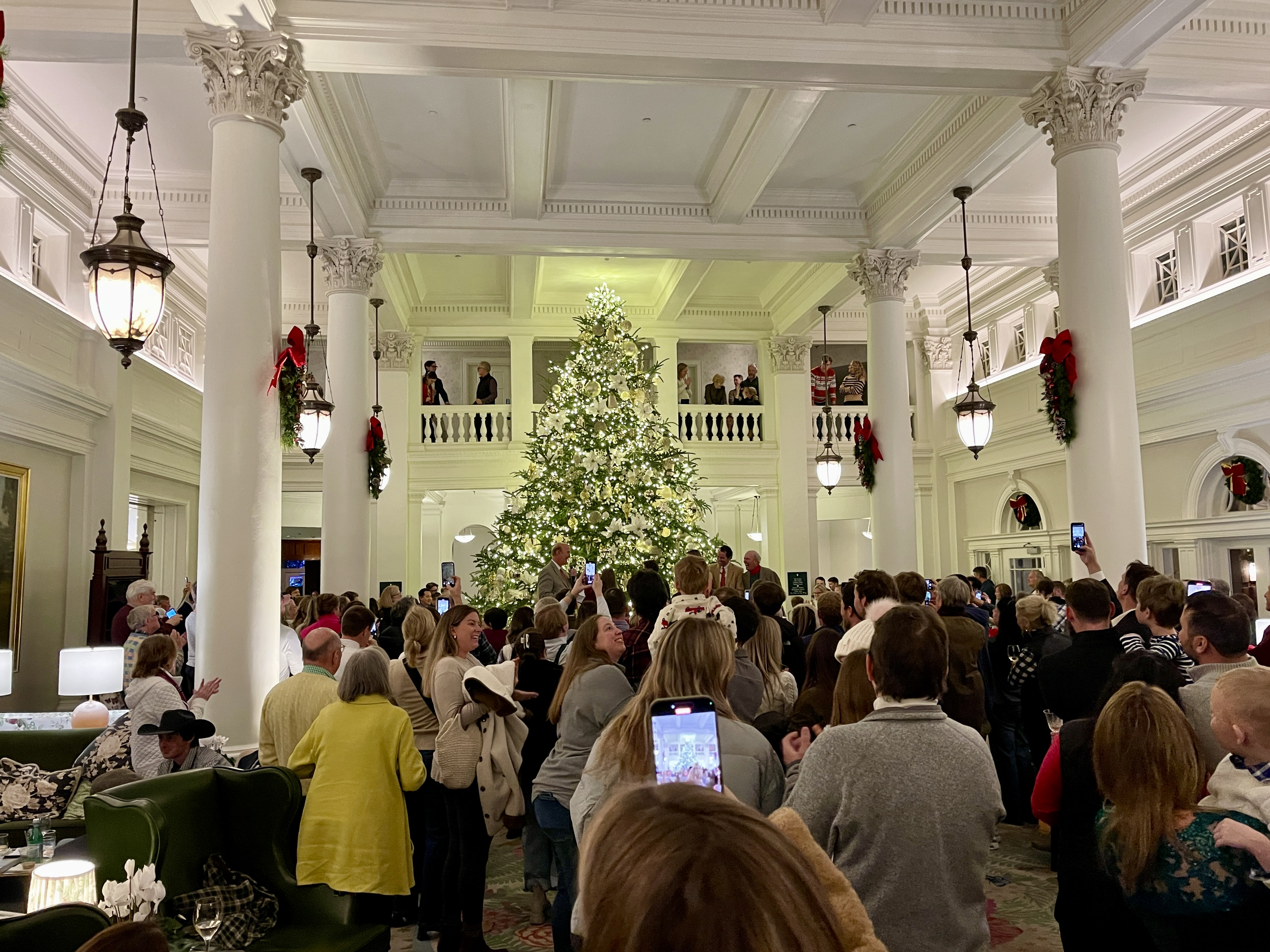
Christmas Tree lighting in the Great Hall of the Homestead

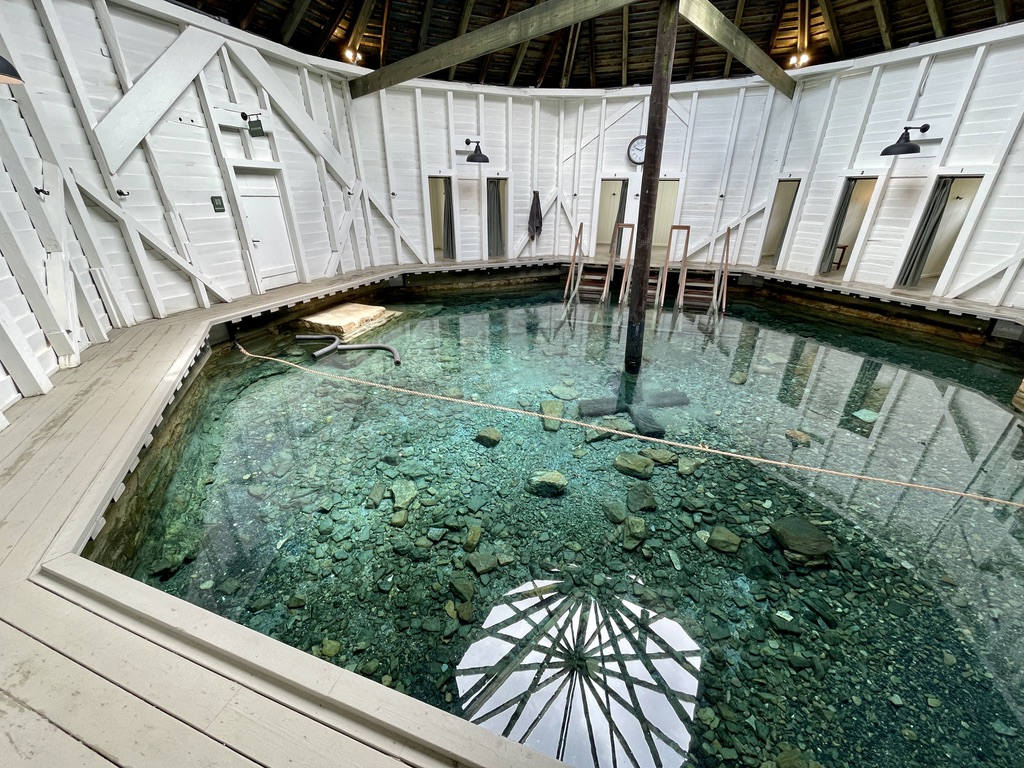
Interior of the Warm Springs Pools, historic geothermal spa buildings operated by the Homestead in the town of Warm Springs, Virginia

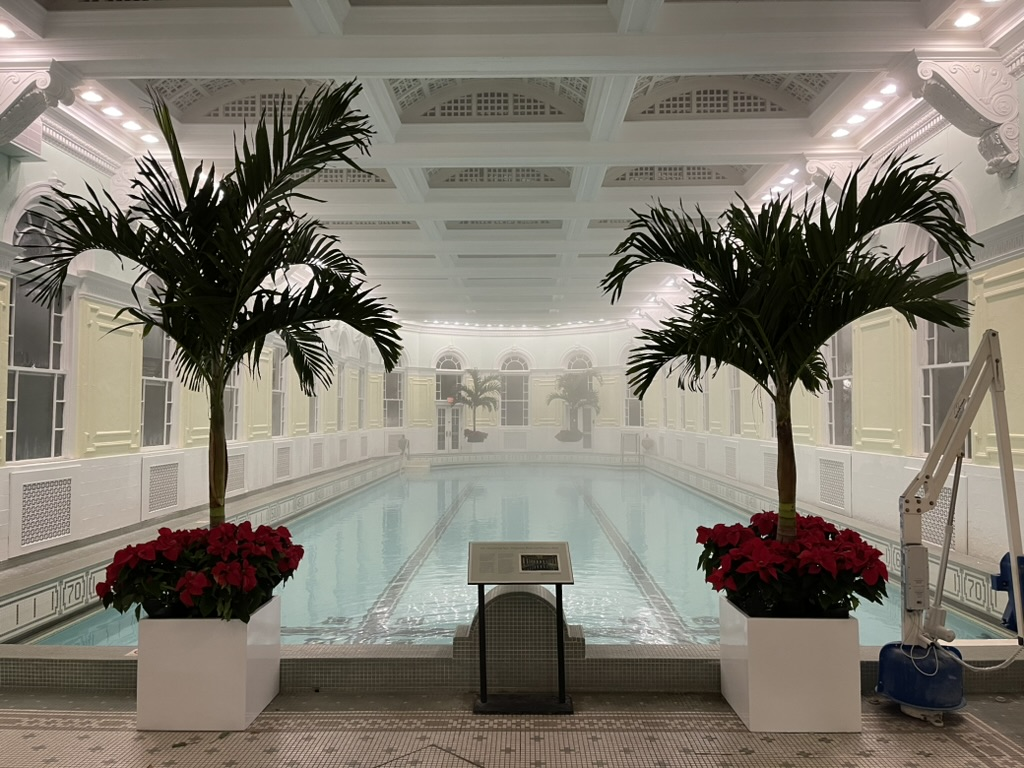
Indoor pool of the Homestead, located in the spa

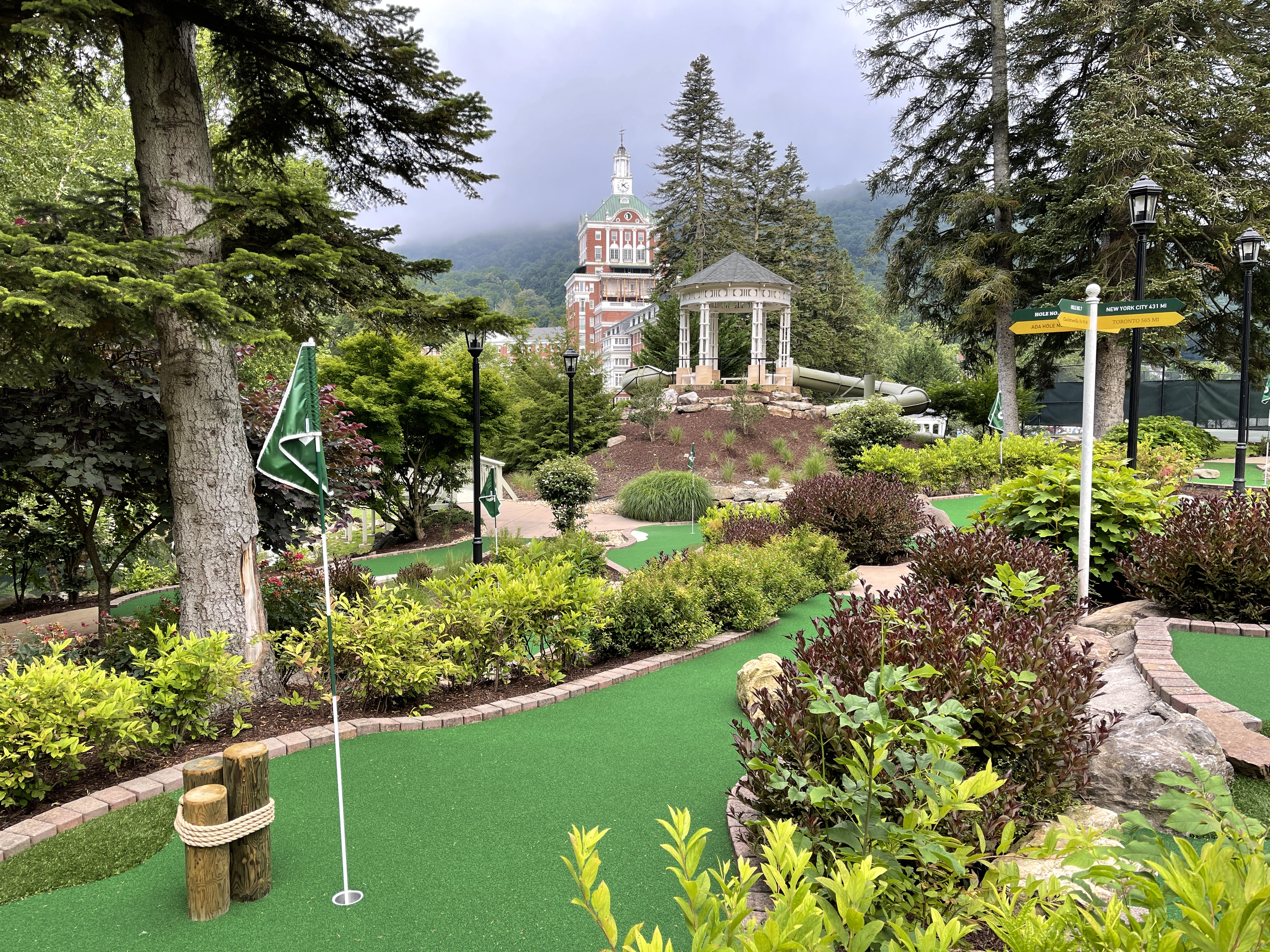
'Mini Cascades' miniature golf course

== See also ==
- List of Historic Hotels of America
- List of National Historic Landmarks in Virginia
- National Register of Historic Places listings in Bath County, Virginia
