= Hempstead High School =

Hempstead High School can refer to:

- Hempstead High School (Iowa) in Dubuque, Iowa
- Hempstead High School (Texas) in Hempstead, Texas
- Hempstead High School (New York) in Hempstead, New York
  - Hempstead High (album) an album by rapper, A+. Named for Hempstead High School in Hempstead, NY.
- West Hempstead High School in West Hempstead, New York
