= Harner Homestead =

Historic house in West Virginia, United States

- U.S. National Register of Historic Places
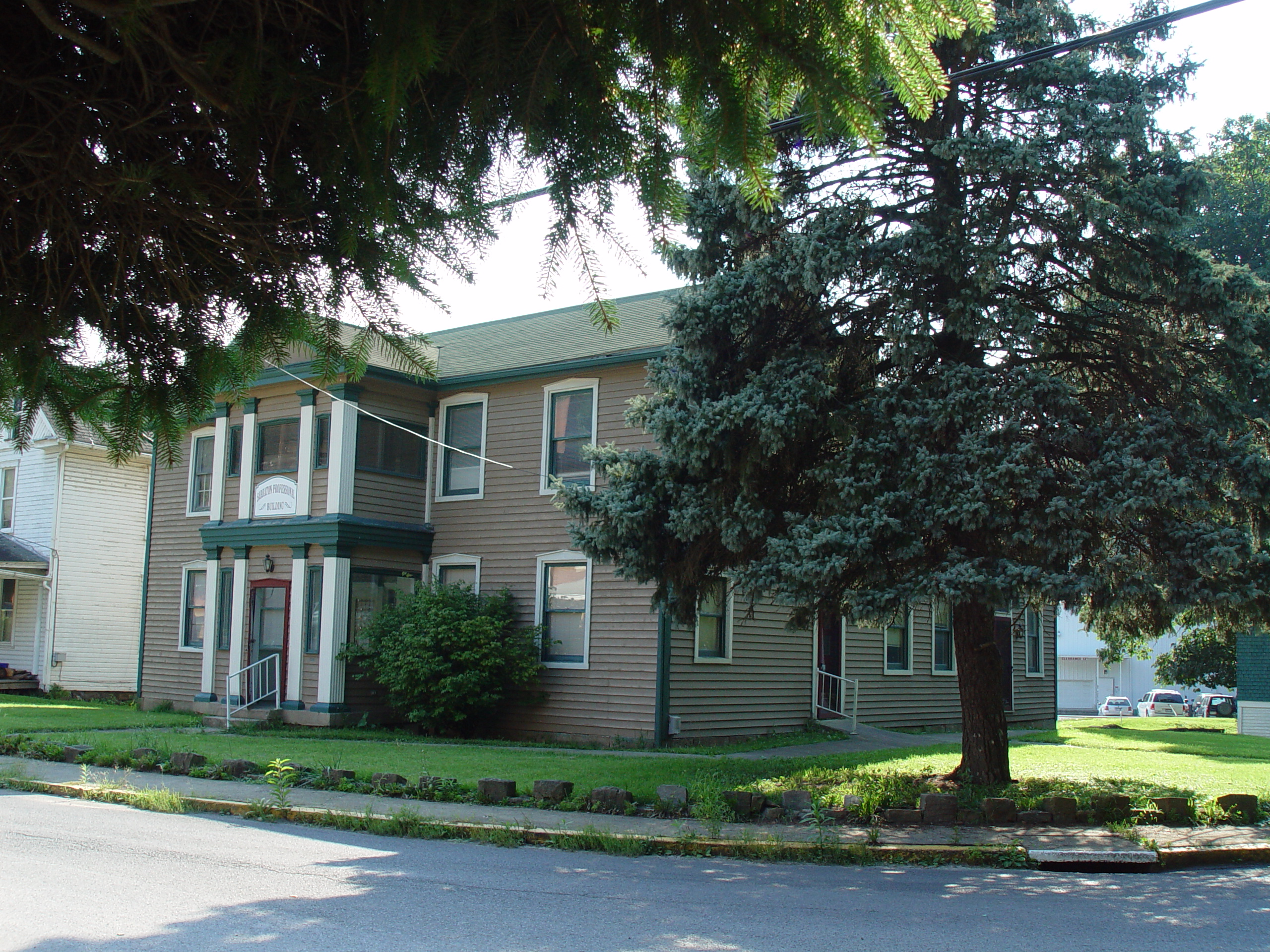
- The Harner Homestead

- Location within West Virginia Location within the United States
- Location: Morgantown, West Virginia
- Coordinates: 39°37′26″N 79°55′14″W
- Built: 1852
- NRHP reference No.: 84003629
- Added to NRHP: January 12, 1984

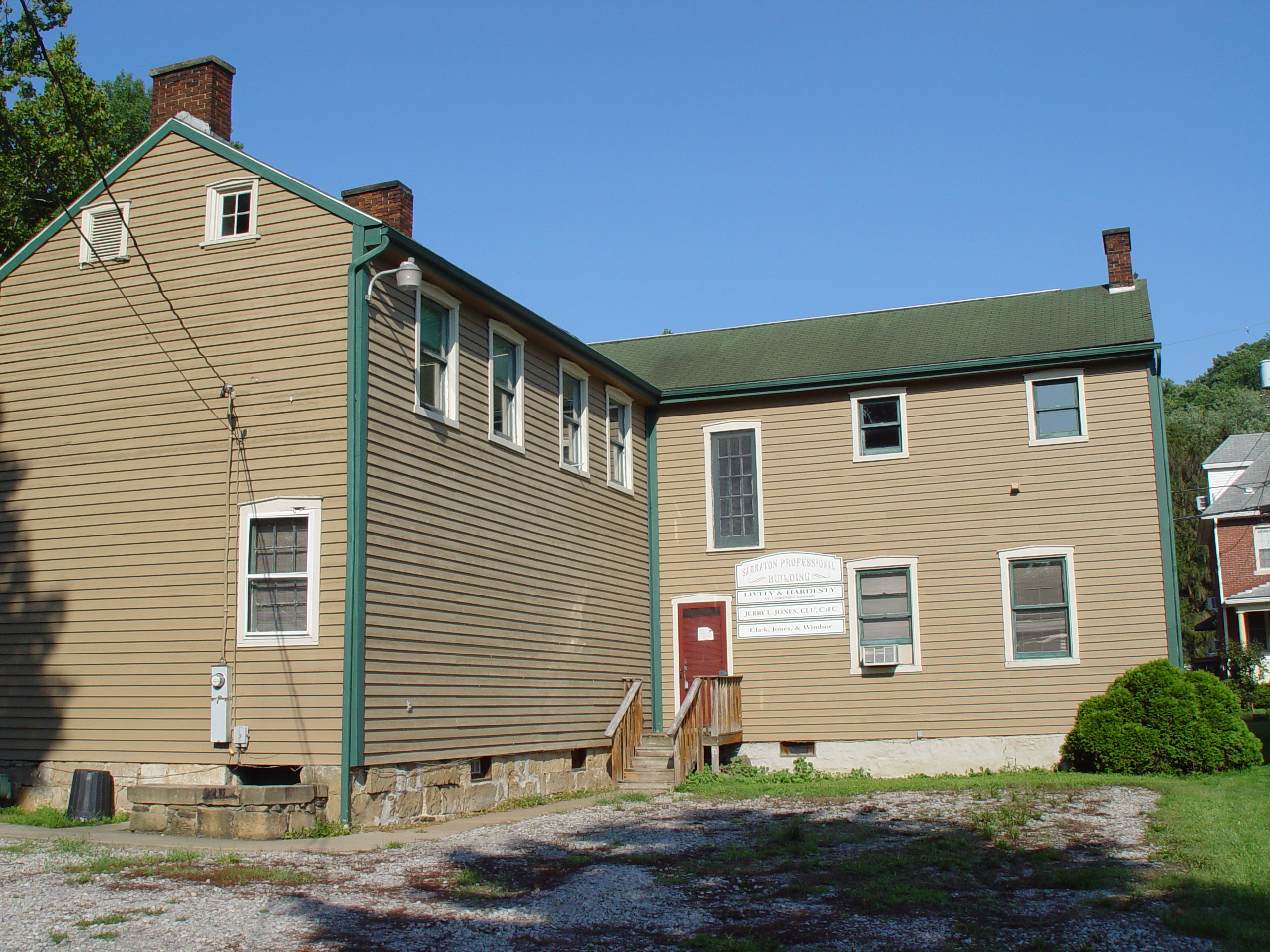
Harner Homestead featuring the ell addition, Morgantown, West Virginia

The Harner Homestead (also known as the Old Harner Homestead), is a historic home outside Morgantown, Monongalia County, West Virginia.

== Overview ==
Located at 1818 Listravia, in the Sabraton area, east of Morgantown, it served as the home of Philip William Harner, blacksmith and farmer. In 1983, Nancy Moore and Deloras Fleming, two women from the History Department of West Virginia University compiled information and submitted documentation to place the Old Harner Homestead on the National Register of Historic Places. The form gives highly detailed information about the exterior and interior of the home, i.e. the woodwork, porches, cabinets, and chimneys.

The main section of the building was built about 1852 and is one of the oldest houses in the Morgantown area. Architecturally, it is an excellent example of an I-house with an ell in the back. The two story front porch is a common feature in the I-house. It is not known when the ell was added, but it is believed that it was built by Phillip William Harner as he had a large family of nine children who are listed on various census reports.

According to the Monongalia County tax records, there is some indication that there was a smaller house on the land when Philip Harner bought it in 1850. Following the trail of early tax records the land was called the Costolo Place; a Samuel Costolo had owned it in 1839 then sold it to James Johnson who sold it to Caleb Dorsey. Dorsey sold it to Harner in 1859. The Harners farmed the land. Much of the Harner property was divided among his sons before his death, but provisions for his wife and the house is mentioned in his will.

Philip Harner was taxed for a building assessed for $200 in the tax year 1851. The following year, a notation on the tax record states that $2000 was added for the buildings. The farm consistently appeared on the tax records as being located two miles (3 km) east of the courthouse. Many other Harner names appear on the deeds and old maps for this part of the county.

Philip and Sarah Harner sold the house and 111 7/8 acres on August 14, 1888, to their son, William T.(Taylor)Harner for $3356.25. The deed includes personal considerations for the elder Harners until their deaths: the use of five rooms, the garden and two cows. William and Nancy Harner sold approximately 100 acres (0.40 km^{2}) to George Sturgiss for $20,000 on July 10, 1902. Harner asked that he and his family be able to live in the house until November, 1902, presumably until the house he was building next door was finished. William kept 1-acre (4,000 m^{2}) directly adjacent to the family house and shortly after 1902 built several houses. The house was placed on the National Register of Historic Places on January 12, 1984.
