= Warm Springs, Virginia =

- Census-designated place
- Warm Springs Post Office

- Location in Virginia Location in the United States
- Coordinates: 38°2′46″N 79°47′26″W
- Country: United States
- State: Virginia
- County: Bath
- Elevation: 2,270 ft (690 m)

Population (2010)
  - Total: 123
- Time zone: UTC−5 (Eastern (EST))
  - Summer (DST): UTC−4 (EDT)
- ZIP code: 24484

Warm Springs is a census-designated place (CDP) in and the county seat of Bath County, Virginia, United States. The population as of the 2020 census was 121. It lies along U.S. Route 220 near the center of the county. Warm Springs includes the historical mill town called Germantown. To the west lies West Warm Springs.

== History and geography ==
The community grew up around the courthouse and the nearby Jefferson Pools. The Bath County Health Department, Sheriff's Department, and other county offices are located adjacent to the courthouse. The Warm Springs Post Office handles mail for the 24484 zip code. Other notable landmarks in Warm Springs are the Bath County Historical Society and the Waterwheel Restaurant, which is located inside a converted mill.

Apart from these landmarks, Warm Springs is primarily residential in character. Many renovated inns and historic homes now serve as accommodation for out-of-town visitors. The Cowpasture River to the east across Warm Springs Mountain draws visitors for fishing and kayaking.

Bath County is fairly unusual in Virginia in that it contains no incorporated towns. Nearby Hot Springs is perhaps more well-known than Warm Springs, though the two are separated by only a few miles.

Jefferson Pools, Hidden Valley Rock Shelter (44BA31), Homestead Dairy Barns, Oakley Farm, and Three Hills are listed on the National Register of Historic Places.

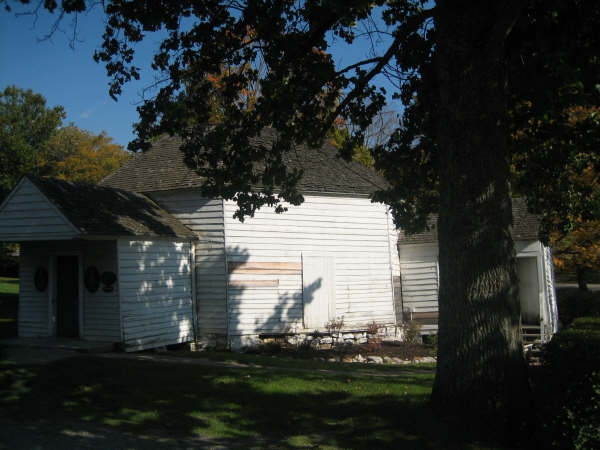
Gentlemen's Pool House, built 1761. The spa waters flow through the center of the building. President Thomas Jefferson bathed here.

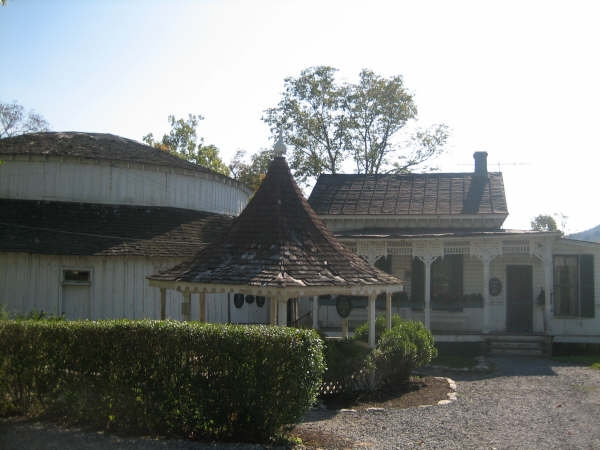
Ladies's Pool House on left, built 1836, with open foot spa in front and spa reception to right

In his classic first-person account of the American Civil War, Co Aytch, the former Confederate private Sam Watkins mentions staying in Warm Springs and enjoying the "little past tepid" baths.

== Demographics ==
Historical population
| Census | Pop. | Note | %± |
|---|---|---|---|
| 2020 | 121 | | — |
U.S. Decennial Census; 2010 2020

Warm Springs was first listed as a census designated place in the 2010 U.S. census.
