= List of places in California (H) =

List of places in California - H

This list of current:

- cities
- towns, unincorporated communities
- counties, and other recognized places in the U.S. state of California.

Information on the number and names of counties in which the place lies, and its lower and upper ZIP Code bounds, if applicable are also included.

== Ha ==
Name of place	Number of counties	Principal county	Lower zip code	Upper zip code
Harsh County	1	Sonoma County	95436	
County	1	San Diego County		
Heights	1	Los Angeles County	91745	
Hackamore	1	Modoc County		
Hacketsville	1	Humboldt County		
Hagginwood	1	Sacramento County		
Haight	1	San Joaquin County		
Haines	1	Ventura County		
Haiwee	1	Inyo County	93549	
Halcyon	1	San Luis Obispo County	93420	
Hales Grove	1	Mendocino County		
Half Moon Bay	1	San Mateo County	94019	
Hall	1	Alameda County	94587	
Hallelujah Junction	1	Lassen County		
Halloran Springs	1	San Bernardino County	92309	
Halls Corner	1	Kings County	93245	
Halls Flat	1	Lassen County		
Hallwood	1	Yuba County	95901	
Hally	1	Stanislaus County		
Halsted Flat	1	Plumas County		
Hambone	1	Siskiyou County		
Hamburg	1	Siskiyou County	96045	
Hamilton	1	Glenn County		
Hamilton	1	Marin County		
Hamilton	1	Santa Clara County	94302	
Hamilton Air Force Base	1	Marin County	94947	
Hamilton Branch	1	Plumas County		
Hamilton City	1	Glenn County	95951	
Hamilton Field	1	Marin County		
Hamlet	1	Marin County		
Hammer Field	1	Fresno County		
Hammil	1	Mono County		
Hammond	1	Fresno County		
Hammond	1	Tulare County		
Hammonton	1	Yuba County	95901	
Hancock	1	Los Angeles County	90044	
Hanford	1	Kings County	93230	
Hanford Northwest	1	Kings County		
Hanford South	1	Kings County	93230	
Hansen	1	Orange County		
Happy Camp	1	Siskiyou County	96039	
Happy Valley	1	El Dorado County		
Happy Valley	1	Los Angeles County		
Harbin Springs	1	Lake County		
Harbin Springs Annex	1	Lake County		
Harbison Canyon	1	San Diego County	92020	
Harbor	1	Ventura County	93001	
Harbor City	1	Los Angeles County	90710	
Harbor Hills	1	Los Angeles County		
Harbor Island	1	Orange County		
Harbor Side	1	San Diego County	92012	
Harden Flat	1	Tuolumne County		
Hardman Center	1	Riverside County	92504	
Hardwick	1	Kings County	93230	
Hardy	1	Mendocino County		
Harlem	1	Monterey County		
Harlem Springs	1	San Bernardino County	92346	
Harmony	1	San Luis Obispo County	93435	
Harmony Acres	1	San Bernardino County		
Harmony Grove	1	San Diego County	92025	
Harold	1	Los Angeles County		
Harp	1	Stanislaus County		
Harpertown	1	Kern County		
Harperville	1	Orange County		
Harrington	1	Colusa County		
Harris	1	Humboldt County	95440	
Harrisburg	1	Inyo County		
Harrison Park	1	San Diego County		
Harry Floyd Terrace	1	Solano County		
Hart	1	San Bernardino County		
Harter	1	Sutter County		
Hartland	1	Tulare County	93641	
Hartley	1	Solano County		
Harvard	1	San Bernardino County	92398	
Harvey	1	Alameda County		
Haskell Creek Homesites	1	Sierra County	96125	
Hatch	1	Stanislaus County		
Hat Creek	1	Shasta County	96040	
Hatfield	1	Siskiyou County		
Hathaway Pines	1	Calaveras County	95233	
Hatton Fields	1	Monterey County	93921	
Havasu Lake	1	San Bernardino County	92363	
Havasu Landing	1	San Bernardino County		
Havasu Palms	1	San Bernardino County		
Havilah	1	Kern County	93518	
Hawaiian Gardens	1	Los Angeles County	90716	
Hawkins Bar	1	Trinity County		
Hawkinsville	1	Siskiyou County	96097	
Hawthorne	1	Los Angeles County	90250	
Hayden	1	San Bernardino County		
Hayden Hill	1	Lassen County		
Hayfield	1	Riverside County		
Hayfork	1	Trinity County	96041	
Haystack	1	Sonoma County		
Hayward	1	Alameda County	94540	57
Hayward	1	Mariposa County		
Hayward Highlands	1	Alameda County	94542	
Hayward Park	1	San Mateo County		
Hazard	1	Los Angeles County	90063	

== He ==
Name of place	Number of counties	Principal county	Lower zip code	Upper zip code
Healdsburg	1	Sonoma County	95448	
Hearst	1	Mendocino County		
Heart Bar Campground	1	San Bernardino County		
Heather Glen	1	Placer County	95703	
Heber	1	Imperial County	92249	
Hector	1	San Bernardino County		
Helena	1	Trinity County	96048	
Helendale	1	San Bernardino County	92342	
Helisma	1	Calaveras County		
Hellhole Palms	1	San Diego County		
Helltown	1	Butte County		
Helm	1	Fresno County	93627	
Hemet	1	Riverside County	92543	46
Hemet East	1	Riverside County	92544	
Henderson	1	Humboldt County	95501	
Henderson	1	San Mateo County		
Henderson	1	Tulare County	93257	
Henderson Village	1	San Joaquin County	95240	
Henley	1	Siskiyou County	96044	
Henleyville	1	Tehama County		
Henry	1	San Luis Obispo County		
Herald	1	Sacramento County	95638	
Hercules	1	Contra Costa County	94547	
Herdlyn	1	Contra Costa County		
Herlong	1	Lassen County	96113	
Herlong Junction	1	Lassen County		
Hermosa Beach	1	Los Angeles County	90254	
Hernandez	1	San Benito County	95023	
Herndon	1	Fresno County	93721	
Herpoco	1	Contra Costa County		
Hesperia	1	San Bernardino County	92345	
Hessel	1	Sonoma County		
Hess Mill	1	Tuolumne County		
Hetch Hetchy Junction	1	Tuolumne County		
Hewitt	1	Los Angeles County		
Heyer	1	Alameda County	94544	

== Hi ==
Name of place	Number of counties	Principal county	Lower zip code	Upper zip code
Hickman	1	Stanislaus County	95323	
Hidden Hills	1	Los Angeles County	91302	
Hidden Meadows	1	San Diego County	92025	
Hidden Palms	1	Riverside County		
Hidden River	1	San Bernardino County		
Hidden Springs	1	Los Angeles County		
Hidden Valley	1	Placer County	95650	
Hidden Valley Lake	1	Lake County		
Higby	1	Tulare County		
Highcroft	1	Sonoma County		
Highgrove	1	Riverside County	92507	
Highland	1	San Bernardino County	92346	
Highland Manor	1	Kern County	93306	
Highland Park	1	Kern County	93306	
Highland Park	1	Los Angeles County	90042	
Highlands	1	San Mateo County		
Highlands-Baywood Park	1	San Mateo County		
Highland Springs	1	Lake County		
Highland Springs	1	Riverside County		
Hights Corner	1	Kern County		
Highway City	1	Fresno County	93705	
Highway Highlands	1	Los Angeles County	91014	
Hilarita	1	Marin County	94920	
Hildreth	1	Madera County		
Hillcrest	1	Los Angeles County	90306	
Hillcrest	1	San Diego County	92102	
Hillcrest	1	Shasta County		
Hillcrest Center	1	Kern County	93306	
Hillcrest Park	1	Solano County	94590	
Hillgrove	1	Los Angeles County	91745	
Hillmaid	1	Tulare County		
Hillsborough	1	San Mateo County	94010	
Hillsborough Park	1	San Mateo County		
Hillsdale	1	San Diego County		
Hillsdale	1	San Mateo County	94403	
Hills Ferry	1	Stanislaus County		
Hills Flat	1	Nevada County	95945	
Hilltop	1	Kern County	93307	
Hillview	1	Santa Clara County	95121	
Hilmar	1	Merced County	95324	
Hilmar-Irwin	1	Merced County		
Hilt	1	Siskiyou County	96044	
Hilton	1	Sonoma County	95436	
Hinda	1	Riverside County		
Hinkley	1	San Bernardino County	92347	
Hinsdale	1	Sutter County		
Hinton	1	Nevada County		
Hiouchi	1	Del Norte County		
Hiouchi Valley	1	Del Norte County	95531	
Hirschdale	1	Nevada County		
Hite Cove	1	Mariposa County		
Hi Vista	1	Los Angeles County	93535	

== Ho ==
Name of place	Number of counties	Principal county	Lower zip code	Upper zip code
Hoaglin	1	Trinity County	95495	
Hobart	1	Los Angeles County	90058	
Hobart Mills	1	Nevada County	96161	
Hobergs	1	Lake County		
Hobo Hot Springs	1	Kern County		
Hoboken	1	Trinity County		
Hodge	1	San Bernardino County	92311	
Holcomb Village	1	San Diego County	92536	
Holder Spur	1	Mendocino County		
Holiday	1	Orange County	92802	
Holiday Forest	1	San Bernardino County	92386	
Hollenbeck	1	Modoc County		
Hollister	1	San Benito County	95023	
Hollydale	1	Los Angeles County	90280	
Hollydale	1	Sonoma County	95436	
Holly Park	1	Los Angeles County	90250	
Hollywood	1	Los Angeles County	90028	
Hollywood Beach	1	Ventura County	93035	
Hollywood by the Sea	1	Ventura County	93035	
Hollywood Riviera	1	Los Angeles County		
Holmes	1	Humboldt County	95569	
Holt	1	San Joaquin County	95234	
Holtville	1	Imperial County	92250	
Holy City	1	Santa Clara County	95026	
Home Acres	1	Contra Costa County	94565	
Home Garden	1	Kings County		
Home Gardens	1	Los Angeles County	90280	
Home Gardens	1	Riverside County	92879	
Home Junc	1	Los Angeles County		
Homeland	1	Riverside County	92548	
Homelands	1	San Diego County	92078	
Homer	1	San Bernardino County		
Homestead	1	Kern County	93537	
Homestead	1	Riverside County	92306	
Homestead	1	San Joaquin County	95206	
Homestead Valley	1	Marin County	94941	
Homewood	1	Placer County	96141	
Homewood Canyon-Valley Wells	1	Inyo County		
Honby	1	Los Angeles County	91350	
Honcut	1	Butte County	95965	
Honda	1	Santa Barbara County		
Honeydew	1	Humboldt County	95545	
Hood	1	Sacramento County	95639	
Hood Junction	1	Sacramento County		
Hooker	1	Tehama County	96022	
Hookton	1	Humboldt County		
Hoopa	1	Humboldt County	95546	
Hoopa Valley Extension Indian Reservation	2	Del Norte County	95546	
Hoopa Valley Extension Indian Reservation	2	Humboldt County	95546	
Hoopa Valley Indian Reservation	1	Humboldt County	95546	
Hooper	1	Siskiyou County		
Hooperville	1	Siskiyou County		
Hope Ranch	1	Santa Barbara County	93105	
Hopeton	1	Merced County	95369	
Hope Valley	1	Alpine County	96120	
Hopfen	1	Sacramento County		
Hopland	1	Mendocino County	95449	
Hopland Rancheria	1	Mendocino County		
Hoppaw	1	Del Norte County		
Hop Yard	1	Sonoma County		
Horizon Hills	1	Ventura County	91360	
Hornbrook	1	Siskiyou County	96044	
Hornitos	1	Mariposa County	95325	
Horse Creek	1	Siskiyou County	96045	
Horstville	1	Yuba County		
Hotlum	1	Siskiyou County		
Hot Plant	1	Humboldt County		
Hough Springs	1	Lake County		
Howard	1	Los Angeles County		
Howard	1	Siskiyou County		
Howard Landing	1	Sacramento County	95690	
Howard Springs	1	Lake County		
Howest	1	San Mateo County	94010	
Howland Flat	1	Sierra County		

== Hu ==
Name of place	Number of counties	Principal county	Lower zip code	Upper zip code
Huasna	1	San Luis Obispo County	93420	
Hub	1	Kings County		
Hub City	1	Los Angeles County	90220	
Hudson	1	Alameda County		
Hudson	1	Stanislaus County	95355	
Hughes	1	Fresno County	93705	
Hughes Mill	1	Placer County		
Hughson	1	Stanislaus County	95326	
Hulburd Grove	1	San Diego County		
Humboldt Hill	1	Humboldt County		
Hume	1	Fresno County	93628	
Humphreys	1	Los Angeles County		
Humphreys Station	1	Fresno County	93612	
Hunters Valley	1	Mariposa County	95325	
Huntington Beach	1	Orange County	92646	49
Huntington Harbour	1	Orange County		
Huntington Lake	1	Fresno County	93629	
Huntington Park	1	Los Angeles County	90255	
Huntley	1	San Joaquin County		
Hurleton	1	Butte County	95965	
Huron	1	Fresno County	93234	
Hutt	1	San Bernardino County		

== Hy ==
Name of place	Number of counties	Principal county	Lower zip code	Upper zip code
Hyampom	1	Trinity County	96046	
Hyde Park	1	Los Angeles County		
Hydesville	1	Humboldt County	95547	
Hydril	1	Kings County		
