= Hidden Valley =

Hidden Valley may refer to:

== Places ==
=== Australia ===
- Hidden Valley, one of Alice Springs town camps, Northern Territory
- Hidden Valley, Northern Territory, a suburb in Darwin
  - Hidden Valley Raceway, a motorsports complex located near Darwin
- Hidden Valley, Queensland, a locality in the Shire of Livingstone
- Mirima National Park, Western Australia, previously known as Hidden Valley National Park
- An area of Wallan, Victoria

=== Canada ===
- Hidden Valley, Calgary, Alberta, a neighborhood
- Hidden Valley, Ontario, a community in the municipality of Huntsville
- Hidden Valley Highlands, a ski area in Huntsville, Ontario
- Hidden Valley Resort, a holiday resort in Huntsville, Ontario
- Hidden Valley Wildlife Refuge, Rural Municipality of Lumsden No. 189, Saskatchewan

=== United States ===
- Hidden Valley, California (disambiguation), multiple locations and a trail
- Hidden Valley (Ski Estes Park), Colorado
- Hidden Valley, Indiana, a private residential community and census-designated place
- Hidden Valley, Nevada, on Interstate 15
- Hidden Valley (New Jersey), a former ski resort
- Hidden Valley (Charlotte, North Carolina), a neighborhood in Charlotte
- Hidden Valley, Pennsylvania, an unincorporated community
- Hidden Valley (Virginia), a floodplain
- Hidden Valley (Bacova, Virginia), a home listed in the National Register of Historic Places
- Hidden Valley, West Virginia, an unincorporated community
- Hidden Valley Farm, Baldwin, Maryland, listed in the National Register of Historic Places
- Hidden Valley Lake (disambiguation)
- Hidden Valley Memorial Forest, Wendell, Massachusetts
- Hidden Valley Resort (Pennsylvania), a ski resort
- Hidden Valley Rock Shelter, Warm Springs, Virginia, an archaeological site listed in the National Register of Historic Places
- Hidden Valley Ski Area, Missouri
- Hidden Valley Wildlife Management Area, Virginia

=== Other places ===
- Hidden Valley (Antarctica), Victoria Land
- Hidden Valley, Nepal, in the Dhaulagiri massif
- Orakei Korako (also known as The Hidden Valley), a geothermal area in the Taupo Volcanic Zone, New Zealand
- Hidden Valley mine, Papua, New Guinea, a gold mine operated by Newcrest Mining
- Coire Gabhail, Scotland, also known as Hidden Valley, in the Bidean nam Bian mountain massif
- A dune-filled valley near the slopes of Aeolis Mons on Mars

== Other uses ==
- Hidden Valley High School (disambiguation)
- Hidden Valley Ranch, a brand of salad dressing
- The Hidden Valley, a 1916 American silent fantasy film
- Hidden Valley (film), a 1932 singing cowboy western
- Hidden Valley Discovery Park a family-run visitor attraction near the town of Launceston, Cornwall, England
- Hidden Valley Dolomite, a geologic formation in the northern Mojave Desert of California, United States
- Hidden Valley Observatory, Rapid City, South Dakota, United States, an astronomical observatory

== See also ==
- The Hidden Valley of Oz, a 1951 book by Rachel R. Cosgrove
