= Hidden Valley Lake =

Hidden Valley Lake may refer to:

- Hidden Valley Lake, California, a census-designated place in Lake County, California
  - Hidden Valley Lake (California), a reservoir in Hidden Valley Lake, California
- A lake in Hidden Valley, Indiana
- A lake in the Hidden Valley Wildlife Management Area, Washington County, Virginia

== See also ==
- Hidden Lake (disambiguation)
- Hidden Valley (disambiguation)
