= Dreamboat (film) =

1952 film by Claude Binyon

- Directed by: Claude Binyon
- Screenplay by: Claude Binyon
- Based on: Love Man; 1950 Collier's serial story by John D. Weaver
- Produced by: Sol C. Siegel
- Starring: Clifton Webb; Ginger Rogers; Anne Francis; Jeffrey Hunter
- Cinematography: Milton R. Krasner
- Edited by: James B. Clark
- Music by: Cyril J. Mockridge
- Distributed by: Twentieth Century-Fox
- Release date: July 26, 1952
- Running time: 83 minutes
- Country: United States
- Language: English
- Box office: $2 million

Dreamboat (also titled Dream Boat in promotional materials) is a 1952 American comedy film directed by Claude Binyon and starring Clifton Webb, Ginger Rogers, Anne Francis and Jeffrey Hunter.

== Plot ==
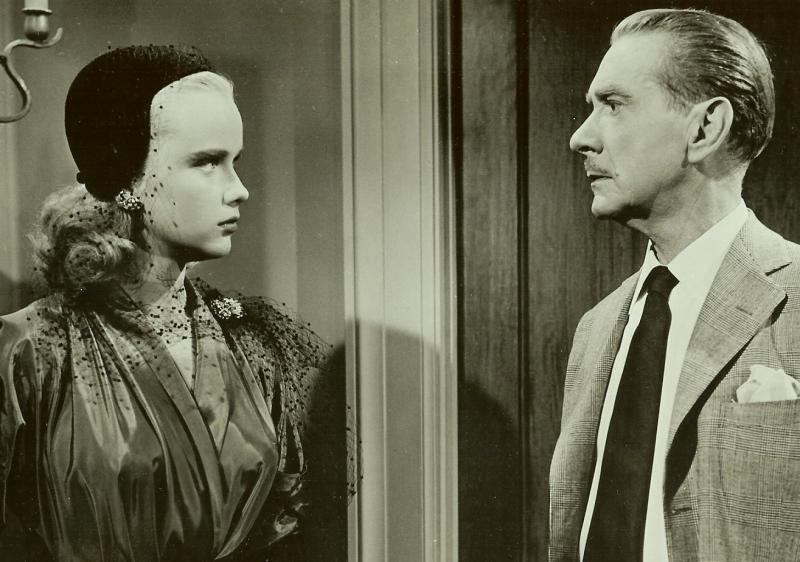
Anne Francis and Clifton Webb in Dreamboat

The respectable lives of English literature lecturer Thornton Sayre and his daughter Carol are disrupted when it is revealed that Thornton was once the matinee idol Bruce Blair, who played El Toro and other romantic figures and was widely known as the "Dreamboat". His films are now broadcast on a television show hosted by his former costar Gloria Marlowe.

Thornton's daughter Carol is belittled by fellow students following the revelation. Her father affirms that he was a teacher before he became an actor. The college administration committee asks for his resignation, but president Mathilda May Coffey requests time to determine their course of action. In private, she admits to Thornton that she had been one of his greatest fans and unsuccessfully attempts to seduce him.

Thornton and Carol hastily leave for New York to seek an injunction against the show. While there, they meet Sam Levitt, the man responsible for airing the films. While Sam and Gloria try to convince Thornton to change his mind, Sam asks underling Bill Ainslee to show Carol the city.

Thornton eventually procures his injunction, but he is fired after spurning Coffey's advances. Bill and Carol have fallen in love and are planning to marry.

When Gloria gloats over Thornton's setbacks, he reveals that a major movie studio is interested in reviving his film career. Months later, Bill and Carol attend Thornton's premiere in Sitting Pretty (a real film that starred Clifton Webb). Gloria reveals to Thornton that she has bought his contract and is now his boss.

== Cast ==
- Clifton Webb as Thornton Sayre / "Dreamboat" / Bruce Blair
- Ginger Rogers as Gloria Marlowe
- Anne Francis as Carol Sayre
- Jeffrey Hunter as Bill Ainslee
- Elsa Lanchester as Dr. Matilda Coffey
- Fred Clark as Sam Levitt
- Paul Harvey as Harrington
- Ray Collins as Timothy Stone
- Helene Stanley as Mimi
- Richard Garrick as Judge Bowles
- Jay Adler as a Desk Clerk
- Emory Parnell as Crazy Sam

== Production ==
Claude Binyon wrote the screenplay based on a four-part serial story by John D. Weaver titled "The Love Man" that was published in Collier's magazine from May 26 to June 16, 1951.

Rogers and Webb rehearsed an intense bolero dance scene for 10 days, but Webb fell during the practice and the number was eliminated from the script.

== Music ==
The film features the 1920 standard Al Jolson hit "Avalon", written by Jolson, Buddy DeSylva and Vincent Rose, as well as Ginger Rogers singing "You'll Never Know", a 1943 song written by Harry Warren and Mack Gordon.

== Release ==
Dreamboat premiered at the Roxy Theatre in New York on July 25, 1952. Its opening was highly successful at the box office and the film's engagement at the theater was extended.

== Reception ==
In a contemporary review for The New York Times, critic Bosley Crowther wrote: "Hollywood's low opinion of TV is once more revealed with blithely superior derision and a lordly splurge of burlesque ... [T]he fastest and most hilarious sport in the film is that generated in the travesties of old silent movies that are shown. ... These are the most inventive and satiric bits in the film. ... Mr. Webb is deliciously consistent when dishing out cutting remarks or betraying the slightest traces of middle-aged vanity, but he falls in a heap of cheap nonsense when compelled to 'go Hollywood.' They have to borrow a scene from 'Sitting Pretty' to prop him up at the end."

== Legacy ==
The film's screenwriter and director Claude Binyon hoped to capitalize on its success by reuniting Rogers and Webb for a film titled Gold Country set in the Yuba Goldfields region, but the project never materialized.
