= Mount Hope, California =

Mount Hope, California may refer to:

- Mount Hope, California, former name of Hayden Hill, California
- Mount Hope, San Diego, California
