= Fort Jones =

Fort Jones may mean:

- Fort Jones, the U. S. Army outpost in Siskiyou County, California
- Fort Jones, California, a town 1 mile north of the site of the old Fort Jones, in Siskiyou County.
