= Hammonton =

Hammonton may refer to:

- Hammonton, California
- Hammonton, New Jersey
