= Hood, California =

Hood
- Census-designated place
- Location of Hood in Sacramento County, California.

- Location within California Location within the United States
- Coordinates: 38°22′06″N 121°31′03″W
- Country: United States
- State: California
- County: Sacramento

Area
  - Total: 0.315 sq mi (0.82 km^{2})
  - Land: 0.315 sq mi (0.82 km^{2})
  - Water: 0 sq mi (0 km^{2}) 0%
- Elevation: 7 ft (2.1 m)

Population (2020)
  - Total: 244
  - Density: 775/sq mi (299/km^{2})
- Time zone: UTC-8 (PST)
  - Summer (DST): UTC-7 (PDT)
- ZIP code: 95639
- Area codes: 916, 279
- GNIS feature IDs: 225528; 2583037

Hood is a census-designated place in Sacramento County, California, United States. As of the 2020 census, Hood had a population of 244. Hood is located on the Sacramento River and California State Route 160 15 miles (24 km) south of downtown Sacramento. Hood has a post office with ZIP code 95639 that was established in 1912.

== History ==
The community was named in 1910 after William Hood, chief engineer of the Southern Pacific Railroad.

The population was 244 at the 2020 census.

== Geography ==
According to the United States Census Bureau, the CDP covers an area of 0.3 square mile (0.8 km^{2}), all land.

== Demographics ==
Historical population
| Census | Pop. | Note | %± |
|---|---|---|---|
| 2010 | 271 | | — |
| 2020 | 244 | | −10.0% |
U.S. Decennial Census; 1850–1870 1880-1890; 1900 1910 1920; 1930 1940 1950; 1960 1970 1980; 1990 2000 2010

Hood first appeared as a census designated place in the 2010 U.S. census.

The 2020 United States census reported that Hood had a population of 244. The population density was 774.6 inhabitants per square mile (299.1/km^{2}). The racial makeup of Hood was 97 (39.8%) White, 0 (0.0%) African American, 21 (8.6%) Native American, 3 (1.2%) Asian, 1 (0.4%) Pacific Islander, 96 (39.3%) from other races, and 26 (10.7%) from two or more races. Hispanic or Latino of any race were 133 persons (54.5%).

The whole population lived in households. There were 105 households, out of which 41 (39.0%) had children under the age of 18 living in them, 44 (41.9%) were married-couple households, 7 (6.7%) were cohabiting couple households, 24 (22.9%) had a female householder with no partner present, and 30 (28.6%) had a male householder with no partner present. 26 households (24.8%) were one person, and 14 (13.3%) were one person aged 65 or older. The average household size was 2.32. There were 70 families (66.7% of all households).

The age distribution was 56 people (23.0%) under the age of 18, 21 people (8.6%) aged 18 to 24, 53 people (21.7%) aged 25 to 44, 68 people (27.9%) aged 45 to 64, and 46 people (18.9%) who were 65 years of age or older. The median age was 43.3 years. For every 100 females, there were 139.2 males.

There were 113 housing units at an average density of 358.7 units per square mile (138.5 units/km^{2}), of which 105 (92.9%) were occupied. Of these, 59 (56.2%) were owner-occupied, and 46 (43.8%) were occupied by renters.

== See also ==
- List of places in California (H)#Ho
