= Hidden Valley (Virginia) =

Valley in Virginia, United States

Coordinates: 38°6′N 79°49′W

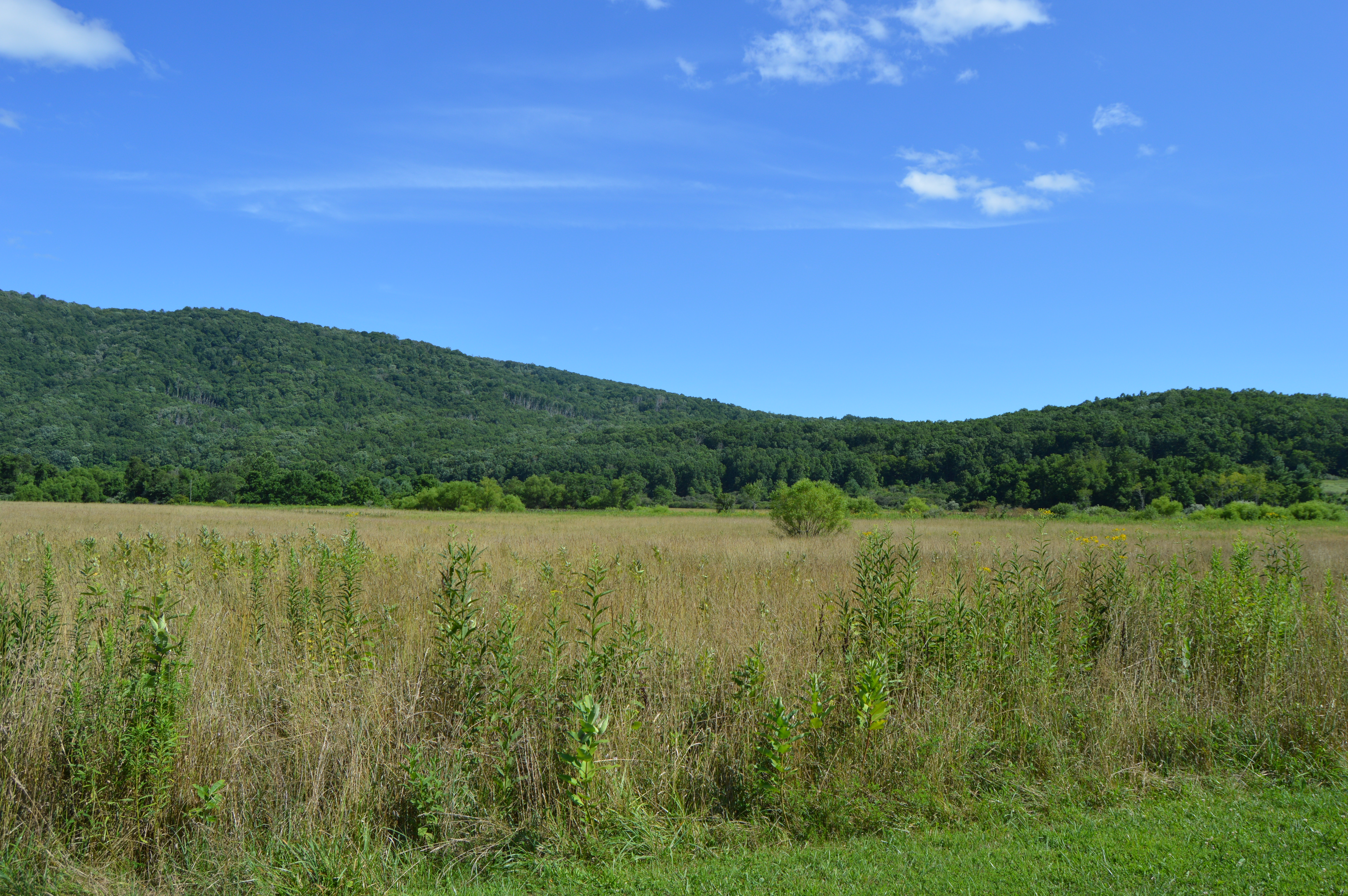
Central meadows and southeastern mountains

Hidden Valley is the name given to a wide, mostly unforested floodplain of the Jackson River some miles north of Virginia route 39 and west of US Route 220 in the George Washington National Forest. The Forest Service maintains the recreation area, including camping, 180 acres of hayfields, and 20 miles of trails.

== See also ==
- Hidden Valley Rockshelter
