= The Quiet Gun =

1957 film by William F. Claxton

- Theatrical release poster
- Directed by: William F. Claxton
- Written by: Eric Norden; Earle Lyon (Adaptation for the screen)
- Screenplay by: Eric Norden
- Based on: Lawman by Lauran Paine
- Produced by: Earle Lyon
- Starring: Forrest Tucker; Mara Corday; Jim Davis; Kathleen Crowley; Lee Van Cleef
- Cinematography: John J. Mescall
- Music by: Paul Dunlap
- Color process: Black and white
- Production company: Regal Films
- Distributed by: 20th Century Fox
- Release date: January 1957
- Running time: 77 minutes
- Country: United States
- Language: English
- Budget: $100,000

The Quiet Gun is a 1957 American Western film directed by William F. Claxton and written by Eric Norden and Earle Lyon. The film stars Forrest Tucker, Mara Corday, Jim Davis and Kathleen Crowley. It is based on the 1955 novel Lawman by Lauran Paine.

It was also known as 'Fury at Rock River'.

== Plot ==
Doug Sadler (Lee Van Cleef), a cattle rustler comes to town. He's in a secret partnership with saloon owner John Reilly (Tom Brown). They plan to run the stolen cattle into Hell's Canyon, located on land belonging to Ralph Carpenter (Jim Davis). Carpenter and his wife Teresa (Kathleen Crowley) are separated, so Reilly has sent Native American beauty Irene (Mara Corday) to seduce Carpenter. Then Reilly put a flea in the ear of Steven Hardy (Lewis Martin), the town's Eastern born city attorney about "immorality". When Hardy tries to serve a warrant for his arrest, in the resulting confrontation Hardy is killed. Sheriff Brandon (Forrest Tucker), who was in love with Teresa before her marriage and was friends with Ralph Carpenter, sets out to arrest Carpenter. However, a lynch mob knocks out the sheriff and hangs Carpenter. Brandon arrests the mob and tricks the city council into stopping another mob that demands the release of the arrested men. Meanwhile, Irene returns to the Carpenter house where she is discovered by Reilly and Sadler, who assault her. At the trial the members of the lynch mob are sentenced to three years in jail. Then Mrs. Carpenter arrives with the news that Reilly and Sadler have killed Irene. In a gunfight Sadler and Reilly are killed. Sheriff Brandon is only wounded and reunited with Teresa.

== Cast ==
- Forrest Tucker as Sheriff Carl Brandon
- Mara Corday as Irene
- Jim Davis as Ralph Carpenter
- Kathleen Crowley as Teresa Carpenter
- Lee Van Cleef as Doug Sadler
- Hank Worden as Sampson
- Tom Brown as John Reilly
- Gerald Milton as Lesser
- Lewis Martin as Steven Hardy
- Vince Barnett as Undertaker
- Edith Evanson as Mrs. Merrick

== Production ==
The film was an early movie from Regal Films who made B movies for 20th Century Fox. It was from the same team who had made Stagecoach to Fury (1956).

== Reception ==
During a screening of the film in Los Angeles, an armed robber burgled the cinema and was shot by police trying to flee.

== See also ==
- List of American films of 1957
