= Fort Jones, California =

City in California, United States

- City
- City of Fort Jones
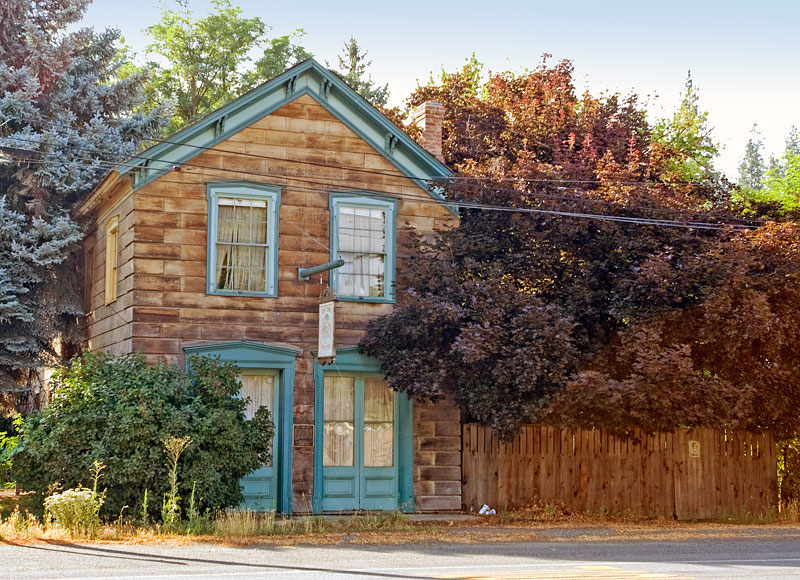
- Fort Jones House
- Interactive map of Fort Jones, California
- Location in the United States
- Coordinates: 41°36′26″N 122°50′31″W
- Country: United States
- State: California
- County: Siskiyou
- Incorporated: March 16, 1872

Area
  - Total: 0.60 sq mi (1.56 km^{2})
  - Land: 0.60 sq mi (1.56 km^{2})
  - Water: 0 sq mi (0.00 km^{2}) 0%
- Elevation: 2,759 ft (841 m)

Population (2020)
  - Total: 695
  - Density: 1,150/sq mi (446/km^{2})
- Time zone: UTC-8 (Pacific (PST))
  - Summer (DST): UTC-7 (PDT)
- ZIP code: 96032
- Area code: 530
- FIPS code: 06-25128
- GNIS feature ID: 277519, 2410527
- Website: fortjonesca.org

California Historical Landmark
- Reference no.: 317

Fort Jones is a town in the Scott Valley area of Siskiyou County, California, United States. Like many of the communities that surround Mount Shasta, it lies in the southern tip of the Cascadia bioregion. Its population is 695 as of the 2020 census, down from 839 from the 2010 census.

== History ==
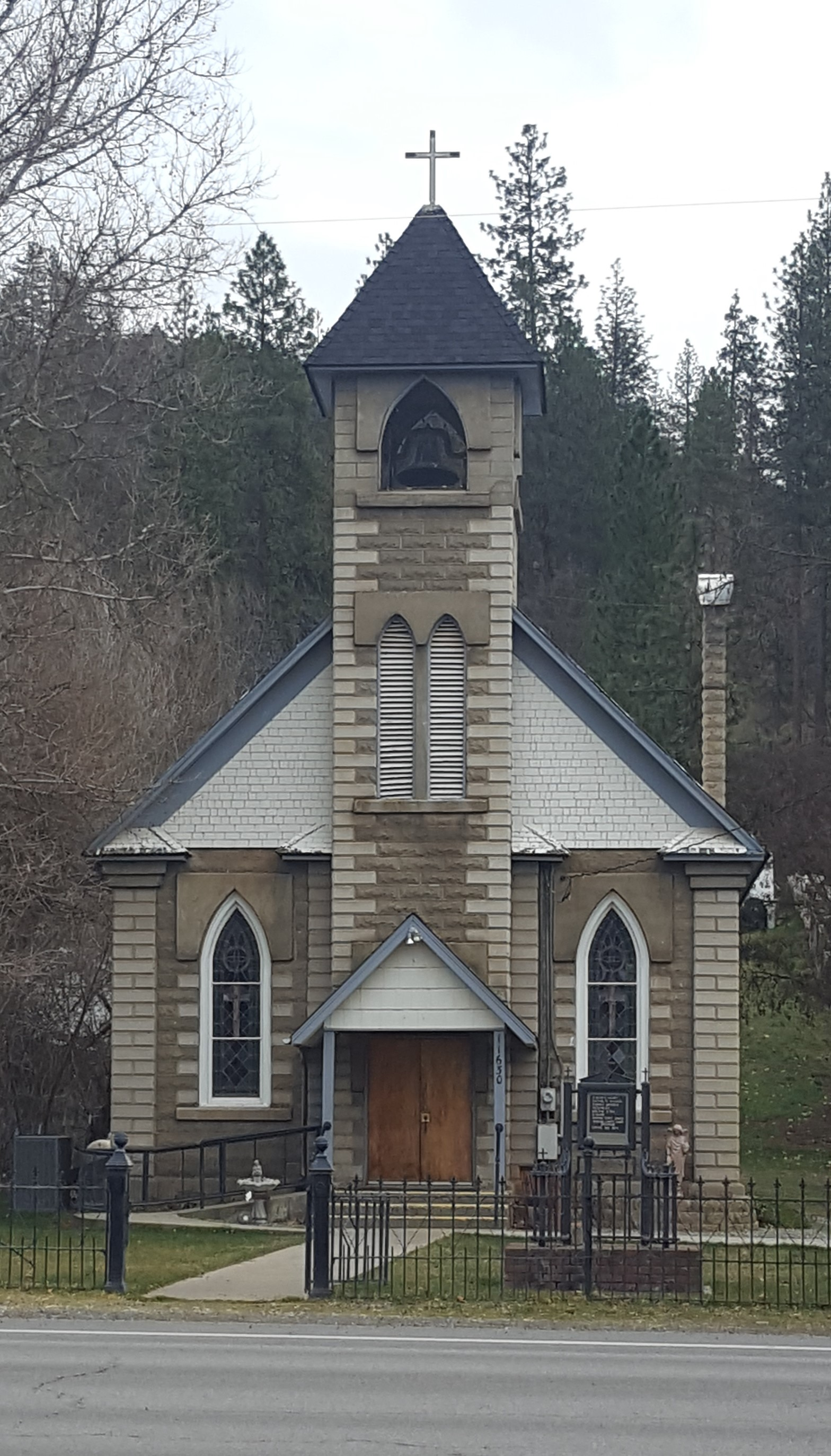
The Sacred Heart Catholic Church in Fort Jones, March 2020

=== Naming ===
Fort Jones is registered as a California Historical Landmark. It takes its name from the frontier outpost once located less than a mile to the south of the city's corporate limits. The town was originally named Scottsburg (c. 1850), but was changed to Scottsville shortly afterward. In 1852, the site was again renamed Wheelock, this time in honor of Mr. O. C. Wheelock who, with his partners, established the area's first commercial enterprise. In 1854, a post office was established and the town was renamed again, becoming known as Ottitiewa, the Indian name for the Scott River branch of the Shasta tribe. The name remained unchanged until 1860 when local citizens successfully petitioned the postal department to change the name to Fort Jones, a name that is retained to the present day.

The earliest permanent building at the town site was built in 1851 by two Messrs. Brown and Kelly. It was purchased soon after construction by O. C. Wheelock, Captain John B. Pierce, and two other unknown partners. Wheelock and his partners established a trading post, a bar, and a brothel at this site, which primarily served the troopers stationed at the fort. Near the end of the 1850s, the nearby mining camps of Hooperville and Deadwood began to disband as a result of the dwindling stores of placer gold, epidemic illness and devastating fires.

The mines around Scott Valley attracted many immigrants from many parts of the United States and the world, attracted to the area by news of the California Gold Rush of the 1850s. Irish and Portuguese immigrants remained as ranchers in the area after making enough on the gold fields to purchase property tracts in the valley. In the early years of the twentieth century, the northern Scott River tributaries of Moffitt and McAddams creeks were extensively settled by the Portuguese. The Irish surname Marlahan lives on after that family received a shipment of British hay seed infected with the seed of a plant known as Dyers Woad. Those seeds spread their spawn throughout Scott Valley, culturing a plant known in the area as Marlahan Mustard. The plant has a beautiful, canary plume in the spring which matures to small, black, hard seeds. Unfortunately, the herbivore beasts of burden will not eat hay in which this plant exists, and ever since it has been a scourge on the ranchers of Scott Valley.

On December 14, 1894, Billy Dean, a Native American, was lynched by unknown persons in the town of Happy Camp, California while in the custody of Constable Fred Dixon. Dean was accused of shooting co-worker William Baremore near Grinder Creek outside of Happy Camp on December 5, 1894. Constable Dixon and Dean were staying at a hotel in Happy Camp while on their way the Yreka, California jail, where Dean would be safe from local vigilantes. Baremore's friends were tailing the pair and waited for their moment. At two in the morning on December 14, 1894, a dozen masked men stormed the room and disarmed Constable Dixon. They tied Dean's hands and carried him to the Wheeler Building which was under construction where they strung him up by the neck from a derrick. His body was left hanging until 11:00 a.m. That day's headline in the Scott Valley News boasted, "He Is Now A Good Indian. Billy Dean Kills a White Man Without Cause and Is Summarily Hoisted to the Happy Hunting Ground."

=== Fort Jones ===
Located at 41°35′46″N 122°50′31″W, the post of Fort Jones was established on October 18, 1852, by its first commandant, Captain (brevet Major) Edward H. Fitzgerald, E Company, 1st U.S. Dragoons. Fort Jones was named in honor of Colonel Roger Jones, who had been the Adjutant General of the Army from March 1825 to July 1852.

Such military posts were to be established in the vicinity of major stage routes, which would have meant locating the post in the vicinity of Yreka, 16 miles (26 km) to the Northeast. The areas around Yreka did not contain sufficient resources, including forage for their animals, so Capt. Fitzgerald located his troop some sixteen miles to the southwest, in what was then known as Beaver Valley. Fort Jones would continue to serve Siskiyou County's military needs until the order was received to evacuate six years later, on June 23, 1858.

Among the officers stationed at Fort Jones who would attain national prominence in ensuing years were Phil Sheridan (Union Army); William Wing Loring (Confederate); John B. Hood (Confederate); George Crook (Union), who would become one of the greatest leaders of the Grand Army of the Republic less than a decade later; and George Pickett (Confederate). Ulysses S. Grant later a (Union) commander was ordered to Fort Jones, but resigned from the Army before his tenure was to begin.

== Geography ==
Fort Jones is located at 41°36′26″N 122°50′31″W (41.607303, -122.841817).

According to the United States Census Bureau, the city has a total area of 0.6 square miles (1.6 km^{2}), all land.

=== Climate ===
This region experiences warm (but not hot) and dry summers, with no average monthly temperatures above 71.6 °F (22.0 °C). According to the Köppen Climate Classification system, Fort Jones has a warm-summer Mediterranean climate, abbreviated Csb on climate maps.

Climate data for Fort Jones, California
Month	Jan	Feb	Mar	Apr	May	Jun	Jul	Aug	Sep	Oct	Nov	Dec	Year
Record high °F (°C)	65 (18)	74 (23)	82 (28)	91 (33)	99 (37)	106 (41)	111 (44)	110 (43)	107 (42)	99 (37)	79 (26)	66 (19)	111 (44)
Mean maximum °F (°C)	58 (14)	65 (18)	72 (22)	82 (28)	89 (32)	97 (36)	103 (39)	103 (39)	97 (36)	85 (29)	69 (21)	57 (14)	105 (41)
Mean daily maximum °F (°C)	45.0 (7.2)	51.9 (11.1)	58.2 (14.6)	65.0 (18.3)	73.4 (23.0)	82.4 (28.0)	91.0 (32.8)	90.7 (32.6)	83.5 (28.6)	71.4 (21.9)	52.8 (11.6)	44.8 (7.1)	67.5 (19.7)
Daily mean °F (°C)	36.2 (2.3)	38.8 (3.8)	43.1 (6.2)	48.7 (9.3)	52.9 (11.6)	59.9 (15.5)	69.5 (20.8)	68.3 (20.2)	60.8 (16.0)	51.3 (10.7)	39.5 (4.2)	34.3 (1.3)	50.3 (10.2)
Mean daily minimum °F (°C)	23.3 (−4.8)	25.6 (−3.6)	28.0 (−2.2)	32.3 (0.2)	37.3 (2.9)	42.9 (6.1)	47.8 (8.8)	45.9 (7.7)	38.1 (3.4)	31.2 (−0.4)	26.1 (−3.3)	23.8 (−4.6)	33.5 (0.8)
Mean minimum °F (°C)	11 (−12)	14 (−10)	18 (−8)	22 (−6)	27 (−3)	34 (1)	40 (4)	39 (4)	29 (−2)	21 (−6)	16 (−9)	12 (−11)	7 (−14)
Record low °F (°C)	−23 (−31)	−22 (−30)	3 (−16)	12 (−11)	20 (−7)	24 (−4)	32 (0)	29 (−2)	16 (−9)	6 (−14)	2 (−17)	−18 (−28)	−23 (−31)
Average precipitation inches (mm)	4.01 (102)	2.81 (71)	2.24 (57)	1.19 (30)	0.85 (22)	0.66 (17)	0.42 (11)	0.48 (12)	0.59 (15)	1.26 (32)	3.14 (80)	4.52 (115)	22.17 (564)
Average snowfall inches (cm)	5.0 (13)	2.4 (6.1)	2.7 (6.9)	0.3 (0.76)	0.0 (0.0)	0.0 (0.0)	0.0 (0.0)	0.0 (0.0)	0.0 (0.0)	0.0 (0.0)	1.2 (3.0)	4.6 (12)	16.2 (41.76)
Source: WRCc

== Demographics ==
Historical population
Census	Pop.	Note	%±
1890	266		—
1900	356		33.8%
1910	316		−11.2%
1920	331		4.7%
1930	302		−8.8%
1940	360		19.2%
1950	525		45.8%
1960	483		−8.0%
1970	515		6.6%
1980	544		5.6%
1990	639		17.5%
2000	660		3.3%
2010	839		27.1%
2020	695		−17.2%
U.S. Decennial Census

=== 2020 ===
At the 2020 census Fort Jones had a population of 695. The racial makeup of Fort Jones was 491 (70.6%) White, 4 (0.6%) African American, 36 (5.2%) American Indian and Alaskan Native, 14 (2.0%) Asian, 0 (0.0%) Native Hawaiian and Other Pacific Islander, 24 (3.5%) from Some Other Race, and 126 (18.1%) from Two or More Races. Hispanic or Latino of any race were 92 people (13.2%).

=== 2010 ===
At the 2010 census Fort Jones had a population of 839. The population density was 1,393.1 inhabitants per square mile (537.9/km^{2}). The racial makeup of Fort Jones was 650 (77.5%) White, 33 (3.9%) African American, 61 (7.3%) Native American, 8 (1.0%) Asian, 0 (0.0%) Pacific Islander, 23 (2.7%) from other races, and 64 (7.6%) from two or more races. Hispanic or Latino of any race were 103 people (12.3%).

The census reported that 710 people (84.6% of the population) lived in households, no one lived in non-institutionalized group quarters and 129 (15.4%) were institutionalized.

There were 304 households, 88 (28.9%) had children under the age of 18 living in them, 130 (42.8%) were opposite-sex married couples living together, 30 (9.9%) had a female householder with no husband present, 23 (7.6%) had a male householder with no wife present. There were 32 (10.5%) unmarried opposite-sex partnerships, and 0 (0%) same-sex married couples or partnerships. 94 households (30.9%) were one person and 34 (11.2%) had someone living alone who was 65 or older. The average household size was 2.34. There were 183 families (60.2% of households); the average family size was 2.91.

The age distribution was 168 people (20.0%) under the age of 18, 65 people (7.7%) aged 18 to 24, 266 people (31.7%) aged 25 to 44, 230 people (27.4%) aged 45 to 64, and 110 people (13.1%) who were 65 or older. The median age was 39.1 years. For every 100 females, there were 136.3 males. For every 100 females age 18 and over, there were 146.7 males.

There were 344 housing units at an average density of 571.2 per square mile, of the occupied units 182 (59.9%) were owner-occupied and 122 (40.1%) were rented. The homeowner vacancy rate was 2.7%; the rental vacancy rate was 5.4%. 426 people (50.8% of the population) lived in owner-occupied housing units and 284 people (33.8%) lived in rental housing units.

=== 2000 ===
At the 2000 census there were 660 people in 298 households, including 185 families, in the city. The population density was 1,096.7 inhabitants per square mile (423.4/km^{2}). There were 328 housing units at an average density of 545.0 per square mile (210.4/km^{2}). The racial makeup of the city was 88.64% White, 0.15% African American, 3.18% Native American, 0.45% Pacific Islander, 1.52% from other races, and 6.06% from two or more races. Hispanic or Latino of any race were 8.03%.

Of the 298 households 28.9% had children under the age of 18 living with them, 44.6% were married couples living together, 12.8% had a female householder with no husband present, and 37.6% were non-families. 33.6% of households were one person and 17.8% were one person aged 65 or older. The average household size was 2.21 and the average family size was 2.81.

The age distribution was 23.6% under the age of 18, 6.8% from 18 to 24, 23.3% from 25 to 44, 24.1% from 45 to 64, and 22.1% 65 or older. The median age was 43 years. For every 100 females, there were 89.7 males. For every 100 females age 18 and over, there were 88.1 males.

The median household income was $21,563 and the median family income was $25,625. Males had a median income of $31,058 versus $16,875 for females. The per capita income for the city was $15,301. About 23.3% of families and 26.0% of the population were below the poverty line, including 31.1% of those under age 18 and 14.5% of those age 65 or over.

== Politics ==
In the state legislature Fort Jones is in the 1st senatorial district, represented by Republican Megan Dahle, and the 1st Assembly district, represented by Republican Heather Hadwick.

Federally, Fort Jones is in California's 1st congressional district, represented by Republican James Gallagher.

== Notable people ==
- Norman F. Cardoza (born September 3, 1930), a journalist at the Reno Evening Gazette and Nevada State Journal, earned the Pulitzer Prize "for editorials challenging the power of a local brothel keeper". He was born in Yreka, California, son of John C. and Emily S. Cardoza, and attended Moffett Creek School and Fort Jones High School.
- Lauran Paine, born Lawrence Kerfman Duby Jr. (February 25, 1916 – December 1, 2001), author of more than 1,000 books, among which were hundreds of Western stories under various pseudonyms, including Mark Carrel, Clay Allen, A. A. Andrews, Dennis Archer, John Armour, Carter Ashby, Harry Beck, Will Benton, Frank Bosworth, Concho Bradley, Claude Cassady, Clint Custer, James Glenn, Will Houston, Troy Howard, Cliff Ketchum, Clint O'Conner, Jim Slaughter and Buck Standish, among others. He was a longtime resident of Fort Jones. At least one of his stories was made into a motion picture.
- John King Luttrell (June 27, 1831 – October 4, 1893), was a U.S. Representative from California. He moved to Siskiyou County in 1858 and purchased a ranch near Fort Jones. He engaged in agricultural pursuits, mining, and the practice of law. He was appointed United States Commissioner of Fisheries and special agent of the United States Treasury for Alaska in 1893. He died in Sitka, Alaska, at age 62, and was interred in Fort Jones Cemetery.

== See also ==
- Fort Jones Mount Oliver, Pennsylvania
