= Hidden Valley, California =

Hidden Valley, California may refer to:

- Hidden Valley, El Dorado County, California
- Hidden Valley, Placer County, California
- Hidden Valley, Ventura County, California
- Hidden Valley Lake, Lake County, California
- Hidden Valley (Joshua Tree National Park)
