= Lauran Paine =

American writer

Lauran Bosworth Paine
- Born: Lawrence Kerfman Duby Jr. February 25, 1916; Duluth, Minnesota, U.S.
- Died: December 1, 2001 (aged 85); Fort Jones, California, U.S.
- Occupation: Author
- Writing career
- Pen name: Mark Carrel, John Kilgore, Clay Allen, A. A. Andrews, and dozens of others

Lauran Bosworth Paine (born Lawrence Kerfman Duby Jr.; February 25, 1916 – December 1, 2001) was an American writer of Western fiction.

== Early life ==
Paine was born in Duluth, Minnesota in 1916. His family moved to Los Angeles about 1921. Paine's parents divorced in the early 1920s, and he moved with his mother to Chicago to stay with relatives. He attended private school at the Pacific Military Academy in Culver City, California, and the Sycamore St. Alban's Episcopal Academy near Chicago. Paine's sister Nancy died in a car accident in 1930. In the 1930s, he worked as a cowboy, competed in rodeos, and was a movie stuntman in several Johnny Mack Brown westerns and 1936's The Charge of the Light Brigade. He legally changed his name to Lauran Bosworth Paine, apparently after a late uncle.

== Career ==
Paine began writing in 1934 but did not find success until after World War II; by 1948 he was writing full-time. Paine wrote over 1,000 books, including hundreds of Westerns as well as romance, science fiction, and mystery novels. He also wrote a number of non-fiction books on the Old West, military history, witchcraft, and other subjects. Because his publishers only accepted a limited number of books under a single author's name, Paine adopted dozens of pseudonyms including Mark Carrel, John Kilgore, Clay Allen, A. A. Andrews, Dennis Archer, John Armour, Carter Ashby, Harry Beck, Will Benton, Frank Bosworth, Concho Bradley, Claude Cassady, Clint Custer, James Glenn, Will Houston, Troy Howard, Cliff Ketchum, Clint O'Conner, Jim Slaughter and Buck Standish among others. Many of his books, published by Robert Hale of London and distributed solely in the UK, have only in recent years been appearing in the United States, usually as large-print editions.

His books were adapted twice into films: Law Man as the 1957 movie The Quiet Gun, and The Open Range Men as 2003's Open Range.

== Personal life ==
Paine was married twice. In 1938, he married Esther Conklin in San Francisco; they had two children, Robert Treat Paine and Lauran Bosworth Paine Jr. They divorced in 1982. Paine married Mona Lewellyn Shaffer in Yreka, California, in 1982.

== Later life and death ==
Paine was a long-term resident of Fort Jones, California, where he died in 2001.

== Selected bibliography ==
=== Novels ===
- Arrowhead Rider (1956)
- The Long War Trail (1957)
- The Farthest Frontier (1957)
- Rogue River Cowboy (1958)
- The Massacre at Mountain Meadows (1958)
- Range War (1959)
- Northwest Conquest (1959)
- Conquest of the Great Northwest (1959)
- Man Behind the Gun (1960)
- Apache Trail (1960)
- Trail of the Freighters (1960)
- Quick Shooter Beuhler (1960)
- Wyoming Trail (1960)
- The Man from Wells Fargo (1961)
- Return of the Fast Gun (1961), as John Kilgore
- The Time of the Texan (1962)
- This Time Tomorrow (1963)
- Outpost (1963)
- The Sheepmen (1963)
- Guns of Arizona (1965)
- Viet-nam (1965)
- The Buckskin Hills (1966)
- Texas Ben Thompson (1966)
- Death of a Doctor (1969), as John Armour
- Love of a Banker (1969), as John Armour
- Murder in Paradise (1969), as Richard Dana
- Run with the Killer (1969), as John Armour
- Gaggle of Ghosts (1971)
- Witches in Fact and Fantasy (1972)
- The Hierarchy of Hell (1972)
- A Killer's Category (1973), as John Armour
- Squatter's Rights (1973), as Will Bradford
- Ride To Battle Mountain (1974)
- Witchcraft and the Mysteries (1974)
- The Assassins (1975)
- Gunhill (1975)
- The Terrorists (1975)
- The Assassins' World (1975)
- Murder in Hawthorn (1975), as John Armour
- Saturday Night Massacre (1976), as John Armour
- Buffalo Township (1977)
- Desert Journey (1978)
- Double Jeopardy (1978)
- The Man from Tucson (1978), as Claude Cassady
- Frontier Doctor (1979)
- Dakota Deathtrap (1979)
- Punchbowl Range (1981)
- D-Day (1981)
- The Hammerhead (1981)
- Scarface (1981)
- Longlance Plain (1981), as John Armour
- Bannon's Law (1982)
- Adobe Wells (1982)
- Lord of Lost Valley (1982)
- Thunder Valley (1982)
- Carter Valley (1982), as John Armour
- The Trail Drive (1983)
- South Desert Trail (1983)
- High Ridge Range (1983)
- The Witness Tree (1983), as John Armour
- Paloverde (1983), as John Armour
- The War Wagon (1984)
- The Bordermen (1984)
- Tanner (1984)
- Zuni Country (1984)
- The Marshal (1985)
- Skye (1986)
- The Horseman (1986)
- The Homesteaders (1986)
- New Mexico Heritage (1987)
- Medicine Bow (1987)
- Spirit Meadow (1987)
- The Blue Basin Country (1987)
- Trail of the Hawks (1987)
- Custer Meadow (1988)
- The Arrowhead Cattle Company (1988)
- The Guns of Summer (1988)
- Nightrider's Moon (1988)
- The Sheridan Stage (1989)
- The Taurus Gun (1989)
- The Man from Secret Valley (1989)
- The Catch Colt (1989)
- The Law Behind the Gun (1989)
- Peralta Country (1989)
- The Young Marauders (1990)
- The Open Range Men (1990)
- The Bandoleros (1990)
- The Sun Devils (1990), as John Armour
- Arizona Panhandle (1991)
- Riders of the Trojan Horse (1991)
- The Squaw Men (1992)
- The Cloverleaf Cattle Company (1992)
- Adobe Empire (1993)
- The Fifth Horseman (1994)
- Kiowa-Apache (1994)
- The Prairieton Raid (1994)
- Vengeance Trail (1994)
- Greed at Gold River (1994)
- The Gunman's Legacy (1994)
- Moon Prairie (1994)
- Killian's Canyon (1995)
- The Past Won't End (1995)
- Trail to Trouble (1995)
- The Devil on Horseback (1995)
- The Renegade (1995)
- Return of the Hunted (1995)
- The Manhunter (1995)
- Tears of the Heart (1995)
- Timberline (1995)
- Trail of the Sioux (1996)
- The Apache Kid (1996)
- The Rawhiders (1996)
- Lockwood (1996)
- The Triangle Murder (1996)
- The Californios (1996)
- Valor in the Land (1997)
- The Misplaced Psyche (1997)
- The White Bird (1997)
- Wilderness Road (1997)
- Buckskin Buccaneer (1998)
- Cache Canon (1998)
- Murder Now, Pay Later (1998)
- The Man from Coyanosa (1998)
- Six-Gun Atonement (1998)
- The Grand Ones of San Ildefonso (1998)
- Guns of the Law (1999)
- The Killer Gun (1999)
- Murder Without Motive (1999)
- Bags and Saddles (1999)
- The Outcast (1999)
- Death of a Millionaire (2000)
- The Mustangers (2000)
- Death Was the Echo (2000)
- Man from Butte City (2000)
- Buckeye (2001)
- The Long Years (2001)
- Thunderbird Range (2001)
- Cactus Country (2001)
- Dead Man's Range (2001)
- The Tombstone Range (2001)
- The Running Iron (2001)
- Ambush Canyon (2001)
- The Dark Trail (2001)
- The Unforgiven (2001)
- Winchester Pass (2002)
- The Scattergun Men (2002)
- Trail Without End (2002)
- The Bald Hills (2002)
- High Desert Guns (2002)
- All Men Are Strangers (2002)
- Carleton's Meadow (2002)
- Sheriff of Cow County (2002)
- The Border Country (2002)
- The Green Hills (2002)
- Thieves' Trail (2002)
- Montana Trail (2003)
- Guns in the Desert (2003)
- Thunder Pass (2003)
- Border Town (2003)
- The Free-graze War (2003)
- The Oxbow Range (2003)
- Tumbleweed Trail (2003)
- Brothers of Vengeance (2003)
- Arizona Ambush (2003)
- Gathering Storm (2003)
- The Ghost Rider (2004)
- Lynch Law (2004)
- The Guns of El Paso (2004)
- Cain's Trail (2004)
- Rain Valley (2004)
- Outlaw Town (2004)
- Pinon Range (2004)
- The Gunsight Affair (2004)
- The Man from Copy County (2004)
- Sixshooter Trail (2004)
- Law Along the Border (2004)
- Night of the Comancheros (2004)
- The Saddlegun Man (2004)
- Circle H Range (2005)
- The Forsythe Stage (2005)
- Avenger's Trail (2005)
- Guns in Oregon (2005)
- The Hunter of Faro Canyon (2005)
- Holding the Ace Card (2005)
- Land of Barbed Boundaries (2005)
- The Born Survivor (2005)
- Western Vengeance (2005)
- Texas Revenge (2005)
- Bounty Hunters' Range (2005)
- The San Luis Range (2005)
- Night Of The Comancheros (2005)
- Gunman (2006)
- The Law Trail (2006)
- Utah Summer (2007)
- Halfmoon Ranch (2007)
- Cottonwood (2007)
- Saddle Mountain (2007)
- Man from Durango (2007)
- Morgan Valley (2008)
- Salt-lick Range (2008)
- Corral Canyon (2009)
- Lynch Town (2009)
- Gundown (2009)
- Long Bow (2009)
- Shepler's Spring (2009)
- The Guns of Parral (2010)
- The Gunsmith (2010)
- Horsethief's Moon (2011)
- Hurd's Crossing (2011)
- Beyond Fort Mims (2011)
- Tomahawk Meadow (2012)
- Lost Valley (2012)
- Ute Peak Country (2012)
- Way of the Outlaw (2012)
- Marshal Redleaf (2013)
- Guns in Wyoming (2013)
- The Texan Rides Alone (2013)
- Ghost Meadow (2013)
- Prairie Empire (2013)
- Rough Justice (2014)
- Shadow of a Hang Rope (2014)

=== Non-fiction ===
Biographies

- The General Custer Story (1960)
- Tom Horn (1962)
- Benedict Arnold (1965)
- Bolivar the Liberator (1970)
- Captain John Smith and the Jamestown story (1973)
- Gentleman Johnny (1973)
- Saladin (1974)

Espionage

- Mathilde Carne (1976)
- Invisible World of Espionage (1976)
- The CIA at Work (1977)
- The Technology of Espionage (1978)
- Britain's Intelligence Service (1979)
- The Abwehr (1984)
- Silicon Spies (1986)

Society

- Warm Beer and Cold Comfort (1968)
- Sex in Witchcraft (1972)
- America and the Americans (1984)
- If Airplanes Could Talk (1993)
- Man Things (1997)

== Films ==
- Open Range (2003) (novel The Open Range Men)
- The Quiet Gun (1957) (novel Law Man)
