= Hidden Valley High School =

Hidden Valley High School may refer to:

- Hidden Valley High School (Oregon), Grants Pass, Oregon
- Hidden Valley High School (Virginia), Roanoke, Virginia
