= Hilarita, California =

Hilarita
- Former unincorporated community
- Location in California
- Coordinates: 37°53′03″N 122°28′19″W
- Country: United States
- State: California
- County: Marin County
- Cities: Belvedere and Tiburon
- Elevation: 13 ft (4 m)

Hilarita is a former unincorporated community now incorporated in Belvedere and Tiburon in Marin County, California, United States. It lies at an elevation of 13 feet (4 m).
