= Open Range (2003 film) =

2003 film by Kevin Costner

- Theatrical release poster
- Directed by: Kevin Costner
- Screenplay by: Craig Storper
- Based on: The Open Range Men by Lauran Paine
- Produced by: Kevin Costner; Jake Eberts; David Valdes
- Starring: Robert Duvall; Kevin Costner; Annette Bening; Michael Gambon; Michael Jeter
- Cinematography: J. Michael Muro
- Edited by: Miklos Wright
- Music by: Michael Kamen
- Production companies: Touchstone Pictures; Beacon Communications; Tig Productions
- Distributed by: Buena Vista Pictures Distribution
- Release date: August 15, 2003 (United States)
- Running time: 139 minutes
- Country: United States
- Language: English
- Budget: $22 million
- Box office: $68.3 million

Open Range is a 2003 American revisionist Western film directed and co-produced by Kevin Costner, written by Craig Storper and based on the novel The Open Range Men by Lauran Paine. It stars Robert Duvall and Costner, with Annette Bening, Michael Gambon, and Michael Jeter appearing in supporting roles. It presents a range war that happens when free-grazing herder "Boss" Spearman (Duvall) and his cowboys enter the Montana territory of cattle baron Denton Baxter (Gambon).

Open Range was released on August 15, 2003 by Buena Vista Pictures Distribution. The film was the final on-screen appearance of Jeter, who died before it was released, and was dedicated to his memory, as well as to Costner's parents, Bill and Sharon. It was a box-office success by grossing $68.3 million against a $22 million budget and was critically praised.

== Plot ==
In Montana in 1882, "Boss" Spearman is an open range cattleman, who with hired hands Charley Waite, Mose, and Button, is driving a herd cross-country. Charley is a former Union soldier who served in a "special squad" during the Civil War and feels immense guilt over his past as a killer of both enemy soldiers and civilians.

Boss sends Mose to the nearby town of Harmonville for supplies. The town is controlled and the saloon owned by ruthless Irish immigrant and rancher Denton Baxter, who hates open-rangers for using his land to feed their herds. Mose is badly beaten and jailed by the town's corrupt marshal, Poole, after defending himself in a fight with some of Baxter's men. The only Harmonville inhabitant willing to openly defy Baxter is Percy, the livery stable owner.

Boss and Charley become concerned when Mose does not return. They retrieve him from the jail, and Baxter gives them an ultimatum to leave the area before nightfall. Mose's injuries are so severe that Boss and Charley take him to the local physician, Doc Barlow, and meet his assistant, Sue. Charley is attracted to her but assumes that she is the doctor's wife. They decline her invitation to stay the night in a spare room, since it would look improper.

After catching masked riders scouting their cattle, Boss and Charley sneak up on their campsite that night and disarm, humiliate, and injure them. At the same time, other riders trash their camp and shoot Mose and Charley's dog Tig dead. Button is badly injured after being shot in the chest. Charley and Boss vow to avenge their friend. They leave Button at the doctor's house and go into town; with help from Percy, they capture Poole and his deputies, subdue them with chloroform stolen from the Barlows, and lock them up in their own jail.

Charley learns that Sue is the doctor's sister, not his wife. He declares his feelings for her, and she gives him a locket for luck. Charley leaves a note with Percy, in which he states that if he should die, money from the sale of his saddle and gear are to be used to buy Sue a new tea set since he accidentally destroyed her previous set while suffering a flashback to his war days.

Boss and Charley, with support from Percy, are pitted against Baxter and his eight men when they ride into town. Charley shoots Butler, the hired gunman who killed Mose and shot Button, after he brags about it. An intense gun battle erupts in the street, with Boss, Charley, and Percy outnumbered until some of the townspeople join the fight against Baxter. Baxter's men, Poole and his deputies, and the saloonkeeper are killed one-by-one, and Baxter ends up wounded and alone, trapped in the jailhouse. Boss blasts off the jailhouse door hinges with a shotgun and engages him in a close-quarters gunfight, which leaves Baxter dying and asking to be killed. Boss declares that he won't waste a good bullet to put him out of his misery.

Sue's brother tends to the wounded townspeople while the dead are buried and the town is put in order. Charley speaks to Sue, telling her he must leave soon. She counters that she has a "big idea" about their future together and that she will wait for him to return. The next day, he proposes to Sue, and she accepts. After Button has recovered, they leave town to deliver their herd of cattle. Boss tells Charley that he's decided to retire from the cattle business and take over the saloon. He asks Charley to be his partner, and Charley responds that he can't afford that. Boss tells him that he should let Sue, "the brains of the outfit," make the decision. They ride off after Charley tells Sue he'll be back.

== Cast ==
- Robert Duvall as Boss Spearman / Bluebonnet Spearman
- Kevin Costner as Charley Waite / Charles Travis Postelwaite
- Annette Bening as Sue Barlow
- Michael Gambon as Denton Baxter
- Michael Jeter as Percy
- Diego Luna as Button
- James Russo as Marshal Poole
- Abraham Benrubi as Mose Harrison
- Dean McDermott as Dr. Walter "Doc" Barlow, M.D.
- Kim Coates as Butler
- Herbert Kohler Jr. as Cafe Man
- Peter MacNeill as Mack Langley
- Cliff Saunders as Ralph
- Patricia Stutz as Ralph's Wife
- Julian Richings as Wylie
- Ian Tracey as Tom
- Rod Wilson as Gus

== Production ==
=== Inspiration ===
Kevin Costner grew up reading the Western romance novels of Lauran Paine, and Open Range is based on Paine's 1990 novel The Open Range Men. Screenwriter Craig Storper wanted to make a movie about "the evolution of violence in the West." Storper continues: "These characters don't seek violence... But the notion that it's sometimes necessary... is the Western's most fundamental ideal."

=== Casting ===
Robert Duvall was the only actor whom Costner had in mind for the role of Boss Spearman. Costner said that if Duvall had turned down the part, he might not have made the movie at all. Duvall accepted the role immediately and Costner gave him top billing. Duvall got bucked off a horse and broke six ribs while practicing his riding for this role.

On the audio commentary for the DVD of the movie, Costner remarked that he cast Abraham Benrubi as his way of apologizing for his being cut from Costner's previous movie, The Postman.

=== Filming ===
Cinematographer J. Michael Muro, was hand-picked by director Kevin Costner for his work on Dances With Wolves. The movie was filmed on location on the Stoney Indian Reserve west of Calgary, Alberta. Clayton Lefthand of the Stoney Sioux First Nations worked as a film liaison for the production.

Filming took place from June 17, 2002, to September 8, 2002. Production spent over $1 million to build a town from scratch because Costner did not like any of the existing ones. The town was designed by production designer, Gae S. Buckley and built in seven weeks. The location was so far from civilization that $40,000 was spent building a road to get there before construction could start. Professional cowboys handled 225 head of cattle on the set.

== Reception ==
=== Box office ===
Open Range was a success at the box office, making $14 million in its opening weekend in the U.S. across 2,075 screens and ranking third behind S.W.A.T. and Freddy vs. Jason. Against a budget of $22 million, it finished its theatrical run with $58.3 million in North America and $10 million from foreign markets for a total of $68.3 million worldwide.

=== Critical reception ===
The film received mostly positive reviews, receiving a 79% rating on Rotten Tomatoes based on 184 reviews, with an average rating of 6.80/10. The site's consensus says: "Greatly benefiting from the tremendous chemistry between Kevin Costner and Robert Duvall, Open Range is a sturdy modern Western with classic roots". Metacritic, which uses a weighted average, assigned the film a score of 67 out of 100, based on 40 critics, indicating "generally favorable" reviews. Audiences polled by CinemaScore gave the film an average grade of "A-" on an A+ to F scale.

Roger Ebert gave it three and a half out of four stars, calling it "an imperfect but deeply involving and beautifully made Western". Peter Bradshaw of The Guardian gave the film four out of five stars, writing, "Duvall gives his best performance in ages" in a "tough, muscular, satisfying movie". Marjorie Baumgarten of The Austin Chronicle wrote: "Yet Open Range, though visually lovely and ambitious, never soars to the heights achieved by Unforgiven. Costner's film lacks the moral complexity that might earn it a solid berth in the canon of the American Western".

In particular, the gun fighting scenes were intentionally filmed in giant, wide shots and were praised for their intense realism by a number of critics, yet were the reason the film earned an R rating. Kevin Carr of FilmThreat.com said on the gun action in Open Range: "After The Matrix redefined action in the late 1990s, every crummy action sequence tries to repeat the power of 'bullet time' often with little success. The action in Open Range is filmed real time, grabbing the audience and showing them that when this kind of stuff happens in real life, it happens faster than you think it would". Moviola reviewed the film: (it) has "one of the most exciting final gunfights ever filmed". IGN, USA Today, Total Film, and Guns & Ammo all say the shootout scene is one of the best of all time.

=== Awards ===
The film won the 2004 Western Heritage Award and was nominated for a Golden Satellite Award, an MTV Movie Award (Diego Luna), a Motion Picture Sound Editors Award, and a Taurus Award for stunt artist Chad Camilleri. It was No. 48 of TimeOut London's "50 Greatest Westerns" list.
