= Hidden Valley (Charlotte, North Carolina) =

Coordinates: 35.272°N 80.781°W

Hidden Valley is a neighborhood in Charlotte, North Carolina, that was developed in 1959 by George S. Goodyear. It was originally a predominantly White middle-class neighborhood. During the 1970s, more African Americans moved in and White residents left the neighborhood. After White residents left, the neighborhood became predominantly Black and Latino. The neighborhood is five miles from the center of Charlotte's uptown, twenty miles from Charlotte-Douglas Airport, and its boundaries are North Tryon Street, West Sugar Creek and Reagan Drive and Tom Hunter Road.

Hidden Valley consists of 4,500 single-family houses. Goodyear developed the neighborhood with a story-book theme in mind, by naming the streets Cinderella Road, Candy Stick Lane, Snow White Street and Hidden Forest Road. In 1975, Black residents formed the Hidden Valley Community Association to address community issues such as busing of children. Additionally in 1979 a non-profit called The Hidden Valley Optimist Club of Charlotte, North Carolina (HVOC) was formed. Similarly, the Hidden Valley Community Development Corporation (HVCDC) is a 501(c)(3) non-profit organization was chartered in 1996.
