= Hidden Valley Lake (California) =

Reservoir in Lake County, California

Coordinates: 38°48′38.5″N 122°33′50.9″W

Hidden Valley Lake is a man-made reservoir located in Lake County, California, United States. The reservoir is surrounded by the community of Hidden Valley Lake, California.

The reservoir covers 102 acres and holds 3,500 acre feet of water, with an average depth of 35 feet.

The dam which holds the reservoir was built in 1969 and is built across Coyote Creek.

The Lake is used for fishing, swimming, sailing and low or no-powered boating.
