= Humphreys Station, California =

Unincorporated community in California, United States

Humphreys Station
- Unincorporated community
- Location in California Humphreys Station (the United States)
- Coordinates: 36°57′40″N 119°26′40″W
- Country: United States
- State: California
- County: Fresno

Humphreys Station (formerly Humphreys) is an unincorporated community in Fresno County, California, United States. It is located 23 miles (37 km) northeast of Fresno.

The name honors pioneer John W. Humphreys.

John and his brother Miles Humphreys opened a store at the site after the Civil War. The business catered to stage travelers and to lumber workers on the Tollhouse Road, and was an unofficial passenger drop-off point for the Butterfield Overland Mail. Originally known as Humphreys Station, the site often became known as Humphrey Station after a restaurant of that name opened on the site in 1920.

A one-room schoolhouse operated at Humphreys Station until 1926.
