= Hills Flat, California =

Place in California, United States

Hills Flat
- Unincorporated community
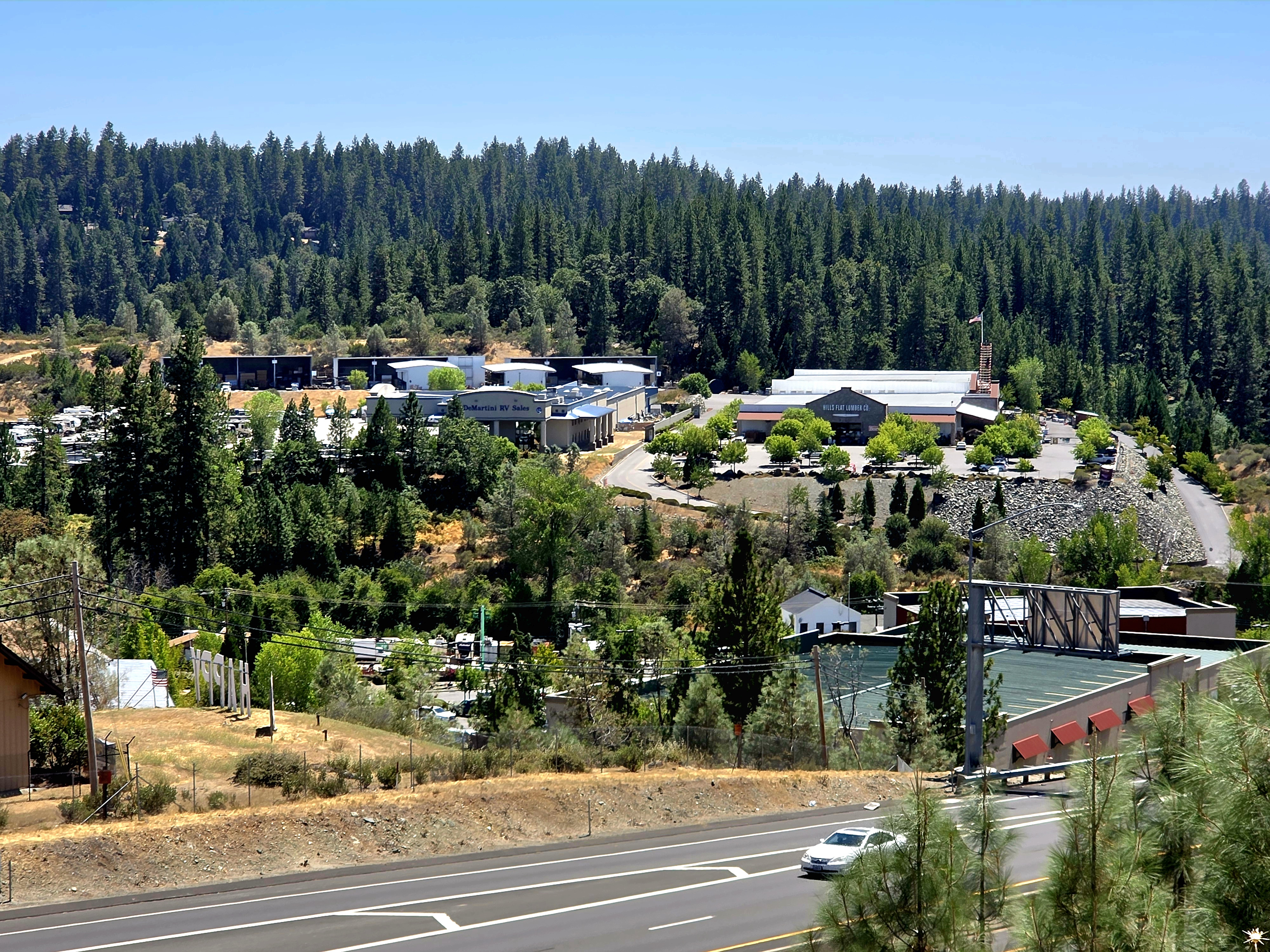
- The Hills Flat neighborhood of Grass Valley

- Location in California Hills Flat (the United States)
- Coordinates: 39°13′27″N 121°03′12″W
- Country: United States
- State: California
- County: Nevada County
- Elevation: 2,457 ft (749 m)

Hills Flat is a neighborhood of Grass Valley, California, United States, formerly an unincorporated community of Nevada County. It lies at an elevation of 2457 feet (749 m).

A former crossroads, Hills Flat became a self-sufficient community in the era of automobile travel, with utilities, several businesses, and a rapidly growing population as of 1932. A referendum on annexation by Grass Valley was held in 1934, and was rejected. Hills Valley residents ultimately voted to join Grass Valley in 1967. Today, Hills Flat is considered a "business district" of Grass Valley, best known for its large lumber yard.
