= Hirschdale, California =

Unincorporated community in California, United States

Hirschdale
- Unincorporated community
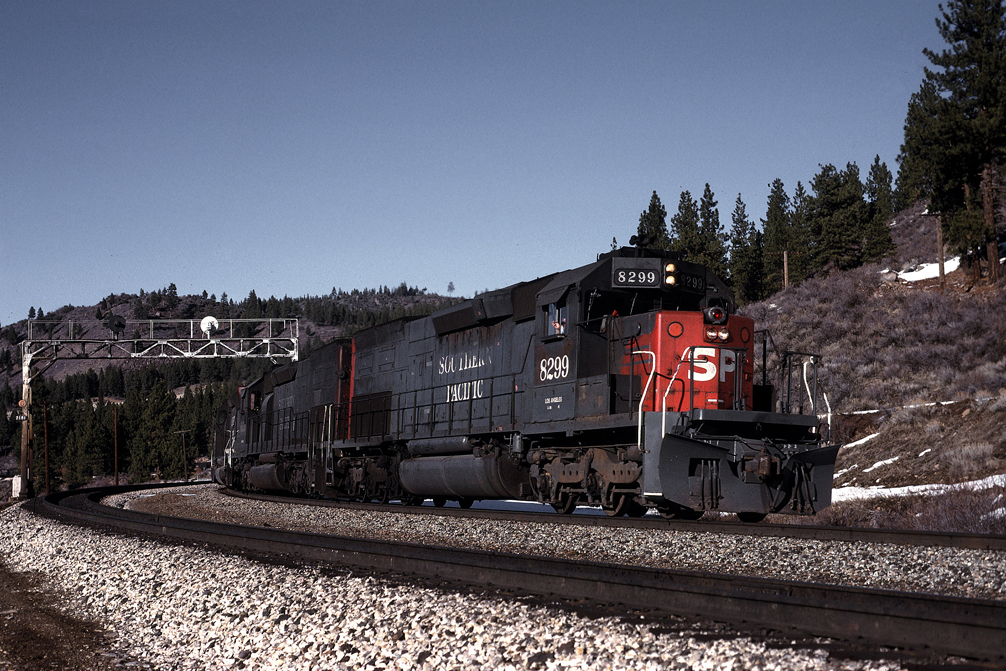
- A Southern Pacific freight train passes through Hirschdale in 1988, photograph by Drew Jacksich

- Location in California Hirschdale (the United States)
- Coordinates: 39°22′07″N 120°04′34″W
- Country: United States
- State: California
- County: Nevada County
- Elevation: 5,450 ft (1,660 m)

Hirschdale is an unincorporated community in Nevada County, California. It lies at an elevation of 5446 feet (1660 m). Hirschdale is located 6.25 miles (10.1 km) east-northeast of Truckee. Hirschdale began in 1926 as a stop on US 40, built by Jonas Hirsch; it was originally a recreational community with a tavern and several rental vacation cabins along the Truckee River.
