= Hurleton, California =

Unincorporated community in California, United States

Hurleton Boston Ranch
- Unincorporated community
- Location in California Hurleton (the United States)
- Coordinates: 39°29′51″N 121°23′15″W
- Country: United States
- State: California
- County: Butte
- Elevation: 1,598 ft (487 m)

Hurleton is an unincorporated community in Butte County, California, United States. It is located 7.5 miles (12.1 km) north of Bangor and lies at an elevation of 1598 feet (487 m).

In August 2013, the town was threatened by a large brush fire, forcing some evacuations.

== History ==
The community of Hurleton was founded by Smith H. Hurles in the late 1800s when he settled in the area and established a hotel. The region became known as the Boston Ranch because of Hurles' previous residence in Boston, Massachusetts. The first post office was established in 1880 and named Hurleton in honor of Hurles, who was also its first postmaster.
