= Haskell Creek Homesites, California =

Unincorporated community in California, United States

Haskell Creek Homesites
- Unincorporated community
- Location within California Location within the United States
- Coordinates: 39°38′05″N 120°33′10″W
- Country: United States
- State: California
- County: Sierra
- Elevation: 5,840 ft (1,780 m)
- Time zone: UTC-8 (Pacific (PST))
  - Summer (DST): UTC-7 (PDT)
- Area code: 530
- GNIS feature ID: 1656062

Haskell Creek Homesites is a USDA Forest Service Recreational Residence cabin tract in Sierra County, California, United States. Haskell Creek Homesites is 6.5 miles (10.5 km) northeast of Sierra City, near the mouth of Haskell Creek, a tributary of the North Fork of the Yuba River.

The area, known as the Haskell Creek Summer Home Tract, consists of 34 summer cabins built on Forest Service land. The first F.S. cabin permits were issued for Haskell, and for near-by Carvin Creek, Ramshorn, Wild Plum and Sierra Tracts and Clark Station in 1947. Cabin owners own the cabins. They lease the land from the F.S., and pay an annual fee. The Haskell Creek Tract Association - HCTA - was organized in 1948, to maintain the tract's roads and water supply. Elevation is approximately 5,800 ft (1,800 m). Snow generally persists from November to May, limiting access to the tract to summer use. Snow has arrived as early as September, and has kept the tract roads closed well into June.
