= Hooperville, California =

Coordinates: 41°41′03″N 122°51′06″W

Hooperville, a former gold mining camp, near Fort Jones in the 1850s in Siskiyou County, California, United States. Its site lies at an elevation of 3054 feet, (931 m). The village site is on Indian Creek Road, and Schoolhouse Gap, Fort Jones. There are a few mines left (private) and the obvious remains of the stamp mill footings.
