= Yuba Goldfields =

Sediment deposits in Northern California

Coordinates: 39.1848°N 121.4778°W

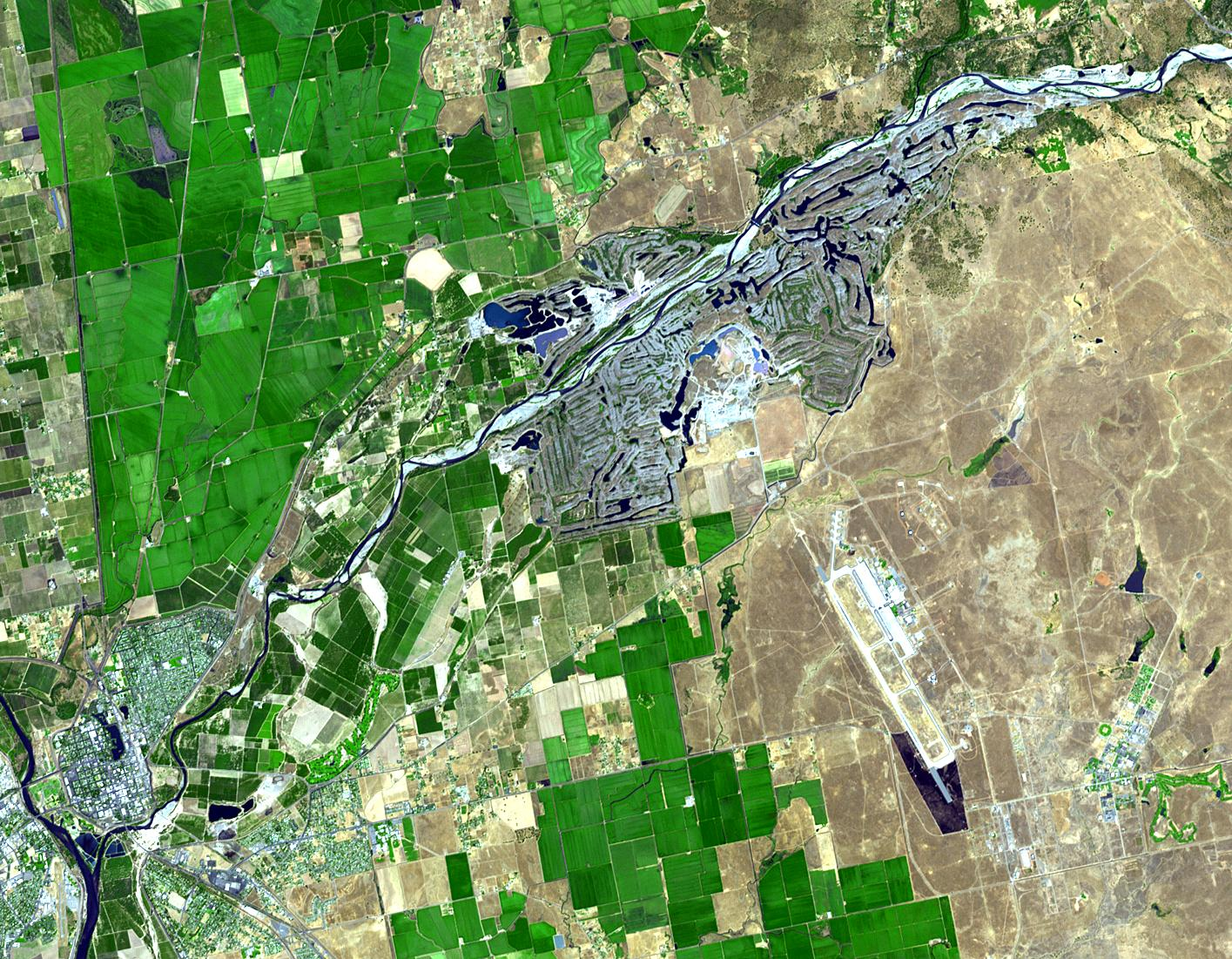
The Yuba Goldfields (center to upper right) straddle both banks of the Yuba River.

The Yuba Goldfields, also known as the Hammonton dredge field, is the largest gold dredge field in California. Located along the Yuba River approximately 6–12 miles (10–20 km) upstream of the town of Marysville, in Yuba County, the Hammonton dredge field was actively dredged for gold from 1904 to 1968. In total, more than one billion cubic yards (760×10^{6} m^{3}) of river sediment and lesser hydraulic mining debris was dredged to produce an estimated 5.14 million ounces (146×10^{6} g) of gold. The goldfields are noted for their otherworldly appearance (a result of gold dredging operations), filled with roughly linear mounds of gravels (called dredge tailing windrows), ravines, streams and turquoise-colored pools of water. From the air, the goldfields are said to resemble intestines.

Wild turkeys, deer, ducks, beavers, herons, bald eagles, Northern river otters and even mountain lions now live in the goldfields.

== History ==
The first Yuba-area miners panned for gold in stream beds in the valley, but within a decade large-scale industrial processes replaced solitary prospectors. Mining companies moved from the valley floor into the Sierra Nevada foothills, where miners blasted gravel hillsides with high-pressure jets of water—a process called hydraulic mining. After the miners extracted gold in long wooden sluices, they dumped the remaining sediment slurry back into the mountain valleys. Rivers and streams carried the flood of sediment—called slickens—down to the Sacramento Valley. Anywhere between 326,000,000 cubic feet (9,200,000 m^{3}) to 685,000,000 cu ft (19,400,000 m^{3}) of debris was deposited in the Yuba River. The mine waste carried by the Yuba River ended up raising the riverbed (by up to 100 feet (30 m) in some cases), causing floods that buried farms east of the town of Marysville with gravel, mud, as well as mercury and arsenic (byproducts of the mining process). As the Yuba River is a tributary of the Sacramento River, much of that debris then found its way to the San Francisco Bay. In Sacramento, the I Street Bridge had to be raised 20 feet (6.1 m). Lawsuits by farmers curtailed hydraulic mining in 1883, but the slickens remained behind in the river systems.

In 1893, the California Debris Commission began to dredge the Yuba River near Marysville to mitigate the environmental damage from hydraulic mining, and piled the gravel along the river's banks. Later, in 1904, W.B. Hammon introduced the first bucket-line gold dredge to the area, and before the end of 1904, two such gold dredges were operating. This Hammonton dredge field rapidly became one of the most active dredge fields in the state, with 14 gold dredges operating by 1908. Dredging to clear the active channel of the Yuba River was done periodically, but a vast majority of dredging was done away from the active channel, with the purpose of recovering gold from the river sediments. This off-channel gold dredging accounts for the vast majority of land dredged, and is what created the linear gravel piles, called tailing windrows, now visible in aerial photos. And while historic upstream hydraulic mining did result in the deposition of 10 to 40 feet (3 to 10 m) of hydraulic mining debris (slickens) in the area of the Hammonton dredge field, these slickens were considered uneconomical at the time (because they had already been processed for gold once), and the primary target of gold dredging was the native river sediments (alluvium) of the Yuba River. To that point, a vast majority of the more than one billion cubic yards of material dredged was native alluvium, not hydraulic mining debris. This dredge field is the largest in the state, both in terms of volume of material dredged, and amount of gold recovered (5.14 million ounces, estimated). The dredgers also created over 200 ponds, which are fed by a network of underground rivers, which in turn were formed due to the porosity of the ground. The water in these ponds is usually clear blue, the impurities having been filtered by the gravel. The Debris Commission also built both the Englebright Dam to the east and the Daguerre Point Dam west of the goldfields to trap debris caused by hydraulic mining.

In the twentieth century, a series of mining companies reprocessed the tailings, extracting gold that was increasingly difficult to separate from the gravel. Even though the ore had already been processed, it was the principal source of gold in California for some time. Two mining towns, Hammonton and Marigold, were founded to house the gold miners and their families, but have been largely abandoned since 1957. By the 1970s, it was economically impossible to retrieve any more gold, and the debris became a source of aggregate, an essential ingredient of concrete. It has been estimated that up to $15 billion worth of aggregate lies within the goldfields, although the mining industry disputes this figure.

The environmental damage caused by the dredgers is enormous. The top 150 feet (46 m) of many square miles was turned upside-down. The soil and the rocks were separated with the rocks stacked on top of the soil.

== Land controversy ==
The goldfields are the subject of an ongoing dispute as to land title and access. Much of the land is owned by Western Aggregate, a mining company extracting gravel from the goldfields. The remainder of the land is split between small private owners, the Bureau of Land Management, and the United States Army Corps of Engineers.

The BLM land is free for the public to use for recreational purposes, but much of it is actually unreachable. Some of it can be accessed via boats on the river, but other access roads have been closed off by Western Aggregate. The parcel of land owned by the Army Corps is technically public land, but it is also inaccessible and it is closed for recreation. Western Aggregate owns mining rights over much (but not all) of that property as a result of a purchase from a gold mining company in 1987 by its parent company Centex Construction, based in Texas. The Goldfields is the largest aggregate mine in the State of California, as well as one of only two dredge gold-mining operations in North America (as of 1989).

The titles themselves are also under much dispute because mining has so shifted the landscape of gravel as well as the river itself that it has become unclear as to what the property boundaries are.

In response to the blocking of Hammonton Road, a county road, into the Yuba Goldfields, the Yuba Goldfields Access Coalition was formed in 1996 by local historian Chuck Smith and neighboring landowner William Calvert. Smith, along with Goldfields residents and 80 members of the community, spent the next 10 years fighting for public access, arguing that the road had been public since 1850, when it was used by gold miners. Dozens of members of the coalition were arrested for trespassing on the public road, although none was convicted. In 2000, Yuba County Superior Court Judge Dave Wasilenko ruled that Hammonton Road was a public road, a decision ultimately upheld by the California Supreme Court in 2002. Two mining company owners were arrested for blocking a public road, and one mining company owner was arrested for threatening protestors with a handgun during the years-long dispute.

== Environmental role ==
In the Central Valley, the Yuba is one of two rivers where Chinook salmon spawn, and the only one that supports steelhead trout runs. Salmon die when they reach fresh water, and their carcasses pile up in the goldfields, where turkey vultures hope to scavenge.

== Possible nature reserve ==
There is currently a movement to establish a nature reserve on the lower Yuba River, which would include portions of the Yuba Goldfields. However, sorting out the land issue could take years. Creating a reserve would also require a large amount of money, but the aggregate could cover much if not all of that. As of September 2016, discussions were still ongoing, with the latest proposal being a habitat restoration project led by the United States Fish and Wildlife Service.
