= Halls Flat, California =

Unincorporated community in California, United States

Halls Flat
- Unincorporated community
- Location in California Halls Flat (the United States)
- Coordinates: 40°45′22″N 121°15′33″W
- Country: United States
- State: California
- County: Lassen
- Elevation: 5,705 ft (1,739 m)

Halls Flat is a location in Lassen County, California, United States on the Western Pacific Railroad, 10.5 miles (17 km) south-southwest of Little Valley, at an elevation of 5705 feet (1739 m). It was the site of a CCC camp, and in the 1940 became the location of a lumber camp named after Paul Bunyan, which operated to the end of the decade.
