= Hayden Hill, California =

Unincorporated community in California, United States

Hayden Hill
- Unincorporated community
- Location in California Hayden Hill (the United States)
- Coordinates: 40°59′44″N 120°53′14″W
- Country: United States
- State: California
- County: Lassen County
- Elevation: 5,715 ft (1,742 m)

Hayden Hill (also, Providence City, Mount Hope, Hayden, Hayden City and Haydenhill) is an unincorporated community in Lassen County, California, United States. It is located 11.5 miles (19 km) north of Lava Peak, at an elevation of 5715 feet (1742 m).

The Hayden post office operated from 1871 to 1875. The Hayden Hill post office operated from 1878 to 1887, re-opened in 1888, changed its name to Haydenhill in 1895, and closed in 1912, re-opened in 1915 and closed for good in 1919. The name Providence City came from the nearby Provindence Mine. Hayden is the name of geologist Ferdinand Vandeveer Hayden.
