= Hidden Valley Wildlife Management Area =

Protected area of Virginia, United States

- IUCN category V (protected landscape/seascape)
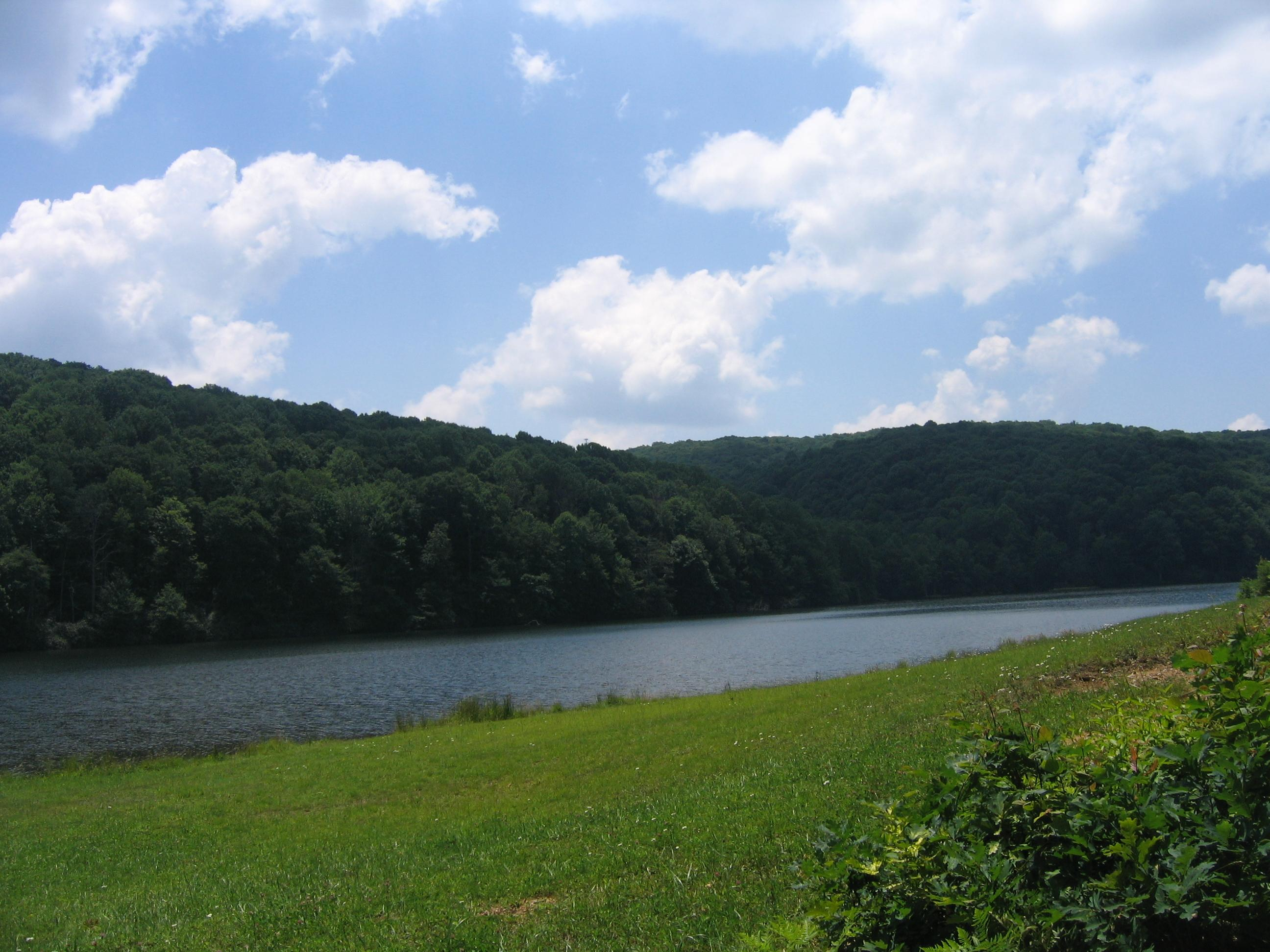

- Location within Virginia Location within the United States
- Location: Washington County, Virginia
- Nearest city: Lebanon
- Coordinates: 36°50′46″N 82°04′42″W
- Area: 6,400 acres (26 km^{2})
- Governing body: Virginia Department of Game and Inland Fisheries

Hidden Valley Wildlife Management Area is a 6,400-acre (26 km^{2}) Wildlife Management Area in Washington County, Virginia, along its border with Russell County. The area is typified by mountainous mature hardwood forests that have regenerated on land logged in the early twentieth century; a number of small openings which are also maintained as habitat for local wildlife. Its elevation ranges from 2,000 to 4,000 feet (610 to 1,220 m) above sea level. At the head of the valley is the 60-acre (24 ha) Hidden Valley Lake, which serves as the source of Brumley Creek.

Hidden Valley Wildlife Management Area is owned and maintained by the Virginia Department of Game and Inland Fisheries. The area is open to the public for hunting, trapping, fishing, hiking, horseback riding, boating, and primitive camping. The game species available include deer, bear, turkey, waterfowl, squirrel, raccoon, bobcat and grouse. The deer are few and far between but mature bucks can be found especially during the rut. Bear are abundant along with bobcats and other furbearers. Turkey and squirrel hunting are very poor but the area boasts a large grouse population. Dogs will have little trouble finding birds, they are easiest to find holding tight to rhododendron patches. Fishing opportunities include small and largemouth bass, walleye, pike and panfish. Small trout can be caught as well in the creek below the dam. The lake is very clear and the best fishing is with live crawfish caught in the creek. A boat launch is available on the north side of Hidden Valley Lake. Access for persons 17 years of age or older requires a valid hunting or fishing permit, a current Virginia boat registration, or a WMA access permit.

== See also ==
- List of Virginia Wildlife Management Areas
