= Hidden Valley Rock Shelter =

Archaeological site in Virginia, United States

- Hidden Valley Rock Shelter (44BA31)
- U.S. National Register of Historic Places
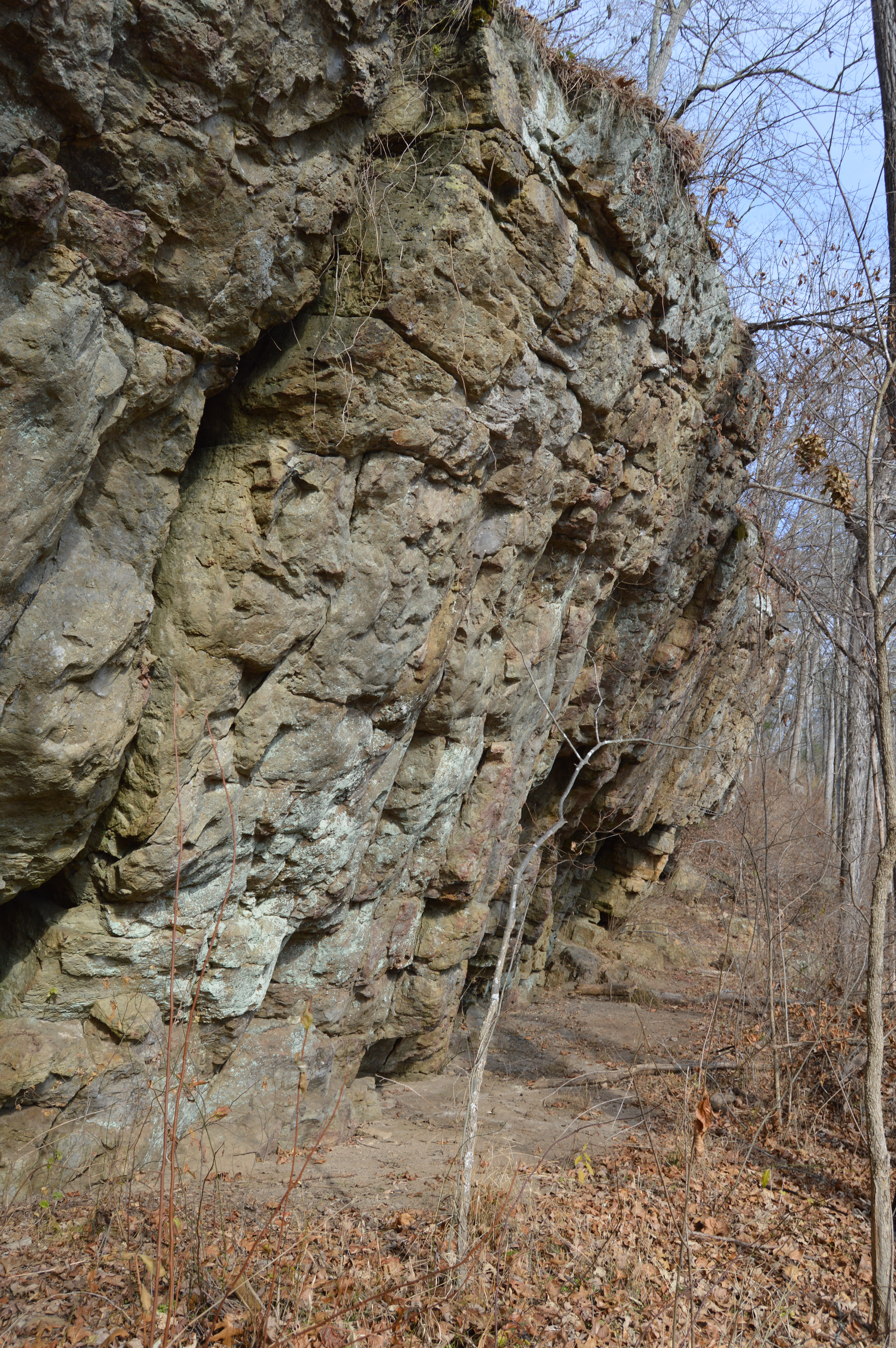
- Overview from the western end
- Nearest city: Warm Springs, Virginia
- Area: Less than 1 acre (0.40 ha)
- NRHP reference No.: 86001945
- Added to NRHP: July 22, 1986

The Hidden Valley Rock Shelter (44-BA-31) is a significant archaeological site located near the community of Warm Springs in Bath County, Virginia, United States. A large rockshelter located near the Jackson River, it has been occupied by humans for thousands of years, and it has been named a historic site.

== Geography ==
Hidden Valley is a tall formation with a nearly vertical rear wall; trees grow below the roof at the shelter's edge. The stone is Oriskany sandstone, located in an outcrop near the western side of the Jackson River, but it is generally safe from flooding due to its location approximately 20 feet (6.1 m) higher than the river's normal surface. Measuring approximately 90 feet (27 m) from end to end, and 10 feet (3.0 m) from the drip line to the base of the rear wall, the shelter is irregular in its shape; vertical striations and deep holes are found on the rear wall.

== Human presence ==
Hidden Valley is known to have been occupied for the last several thousand years. The site's good stratigraphy has enabled archaeologists to demonstrate its occupation since the Late Archaic, three millennia before Christ, while Late Woodland cultural materials are also present. It remained in use into the historic period, as evidence of interactions between Indians and whites is likewise present. However, the site's significance depends on the wide variety of cultural materials dating between these extremes: simple artifacts such as common projectile points and potsherds are found at all locations in the midden, and the continuity of the deposits demonstrates gradual transitions in ceramic and lithic technology from generation to generation of the shelter's occupants. Moreover, the shelter is significant for more than just its pottery and stone tools: both faunal and floral materials are exceptionally well preserved at Hidden Valley, thus enabling scholars to trace the site's environment over the last several thousand years. Human remains have also been found at the site: one human burial, an infant less than a year old, was found with a pair of canine skulls, and the bones of another dog were found mixed with those of an adolescent human. The appearance of canine skeletons may be an indication of the shelter's ritual significance, as ritual burials of dogs are known from numerous Archaic sites; one such site, the Carlston Annis Shell Mound in western Kentucky, produced the remains of nearly thirty intentionally buried dogs. Scholar Cheryl Claassen argues that dog-burial sites were considered places of renewal, a belief that persisted into the historic Cherokee.

== Preservation ==
In mid-1986, the Hidden Valley Rock shelter was listed on the National Register of Historic Places because of its archaeological significance. It is one of twenty-one Bath County locations with this distinction, although none of the others are significant primarily on archaeological grounds.
