= Hidden Valley, Placer County, California =

Unincorporated community in California, United States

Hidden Valley
- Unincorporated community
- Location in California Hidden Valley (the United States)
- Coordinates: 38°45′51″N 121°09′48″W
- Country: United States
- State: California
- County: Placer County
- Elevation: 436 ft (133 m)

Hidden Valley (formerly, Union House) is a housing development in an unincorporated area of Placer County, California, adjacent to Granite Bay. Hidden Valley is located 4.25 miles (6.8 km) east-southeast of Rocklin. It lies at an elevation of 436 feet (133 m).

Hidden Valley was established in 1950 and consists of semi-rural housing lots surrounding 180 acres of pasture and small lakes. It was originally planned as a retirement community, due to its rural setting, but it has since become a bedroom community for the Sacramento metropolitan area. It was once informally called the "Aerojet enclave" for the large number of executives of the aerospace company who resided in the area.
