= Hammonton, California =

Former settlement in California, United States

Hammonton
- Ghost town
- Location in California Hammonton (the United States)
- Coordinates: 39°11′35″N 121°25′15″W
- Country: United States
- State: California
- County: Yuba
- Elevation: 130 ft (40 m)

Hammonton (formerly, Dredgertown and Dredgerville) is a former settlement in Yuba County, California, United States. It is located 3.5 miles (5.6 km) south of Browns Valley, at an elevation of 131 feet (40 m).

Hammonton was a company town for the Yuba Consolidated Mines, which dredged gold from the Yuba River floodplain. Established in 1906, Hammonton had 250 residents, a store, service station, and swimming pool by 1938, when the townspeople were forced to move two miles so that the original townsite could be razed and dredged. In 1957, the residents were again relocated, this time to Linda, so that the new townsite could also be dredged; Hammonton ceased to exist at that time. The Yuba Goldfields now cover the townsites.

A post office operated at Hammonton from 1906 to 1957. The name is in honor of W.P. Hammon, gold-dredging company official.
