= Francis Douglas =

Francis Douglas may refer to:

- Francis Douglas (priest) (1910–1943), missionary in the Philippines
- Francis Douglas, 8th Earl of Wemyss (1772–1853), Scottish peer
- Lord Francis Douglas (1847–1865), son of Archibald Douglas, 8th Marquess of Queensberry who was killed in the first successful ascent of the Matterhorn
- Francis Douglas, Viscount Drumlanrig (1867–1894), Scottish nobleman and politician
- Francis Douglas, 1st Baron Douglas of Barloch (1889–1980), MP from Battersea North and Governor of Malta
- Francis Brown Douglas (1814–1885), Scottish advocate
- Francis Douglas, 11th Marquess of Queensberry (1896–1954), Scottish soldier, stockbroker and author

== See also ==
- Frank L. Douglas, Guyanese American medical doctor
- Francis Douglas Memorial College, a high school in New Plymouth, New Zealand
