= Boston Biomedical Research Institute =

US research institute

Boston Biomedical Research Institute (BBRI) was a non-profit institution concentrating on basic biomedical research to promote the understanding of human diseases (including heart disease, cancer, muscular dystrophy and Alzheimer's etc.). It was located in Watertown, Massachusetts.

== History ==
BBRI was founded in the late 1960s, and relied on federal money to fund most of its research. In 2008 it received a grant to establish a muscular dystrophy research center.

In 2012, reports surfaced that the Institute was financially unsustainable. In the face of a shrinking endowment and decrease of NIH funds, the BBRI Board of Trustees recommended in September, 2012 that the Institute begin a dissolution process. It was also revealed that the institute's funding situation was further hurt when four senior scientists who had significant NIH funding decided to leave BBRI. Members of the Institute's Corporation met on November 15, 2012 and voted to begin the process of closing the Institute.

The research institute closed operations in June, 2013. BBRI was also negotiating with Tufts HMO to sell its 1.3 acre property in Watertown, Massachusetts. The proceeds of the sale would be used to pay off some of the organization's creditors.

=== Timeline ===
- 1950: Charles Schepens founded The Retina Foundation
- 1968: The Retina Foundation was separated into two institutions: the Boston Biomedical Research Institute and the Eye Research Institute of the Retina Foundation.
- 2003: Charles Emerson is appointed as new Director

== Faculty ==
- Andrew Bohm
- Dave W. Carmichael
- Lynne M. Coluccio
- Roberto Dominguez
- Janice Dominov
- Martin L. Duennwald
- Charles P. Emerson, Jr.
- Peter Erhardt
- Jaya Pal Gangopadhyay
- John Gergely
- Zenon Grabarek
- Philip Graceffa
- Markus Hardt
- Celia Harrison
- Sachiko Homma
- Noriaki Ikemoto
- Peter L. Jones
- Oliver King
- Toshio Kitazawa
- Paul C. Leavis
- Sherwin S. Lehrer
- Katsuhide Mabuchi
- Jeffrey Boone Miller
- Kent Nybakken
- Henry Paulus
- Lucia Rameh
- Victor A. Raso
- Nilima Sarkar
- James L. Sherley
- Janet Smith
- Walter F. Stafford, III
- Eric J Sundberg
- Shinichi Takayama
- Alex Toker
- Hiroshi Tokuo
- Moonkyoung Um
- Chih-Lueh Albert Wang
- Sarah Wilcox-Adelman
- Hartmut Wohlrab
