= William Sergeant Kendall =

American painter

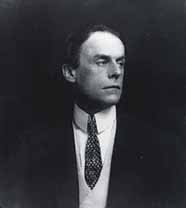
- Born: William Sergeant Kendall; 1869; Spuyten Duyvil, New York
- Died: 1938; Hot Springs, Virginia
- Notable work: An Interlude
- Spouses: Margaret Stickney Kendall (m. 1896–1921) Christine Herter Kendall (m. 1922–1938)

William Sergeant Kendall (born 1869 in Spuyten Duyvil, New York, died 1938 in Hot Springs, Virginia), was an American painter, most famous for his evocative scenes of domestic life; his wife Margaret Stickney Kendall and three young daughters were frequent subjects in his early work.

== Life ==
An Interlude, painted in 1907, showing his first wife, Margaret Stickney Kendall, and one of their daughters. Smithsonian American Art Museum

Kendall began his training at the Brooklyn Art Guild and the Pennsylvania Academy of the Fine Arts as a student of Thomas Eakins. He returned to New York City in 1886 to study at the Art Students League. He moved to Europe in 1888 for further study, including a period at the École des Beaux-Arts, and continued to paint, earning recognition at the Paris Salon in 1891. Like many American artists in France, Kendall spent his summers in Brittany and frequently painted the local peasantry.

In 1892 he returned to New York and established his studio. Kendall and his family eventually moved to Newport, Rhode Island, and then to New Haven, Connecticut, where he was a professor and head of the Yale School of Fine Arts (now Yale School of Art) from 1913 to 1922. One of his students was Adrien Voisin.

In 1901 Kendall was elected into the National Academy of Design as an Associate member and became a full Academician in 1905. He left Yale in 1922 and relocated to rural Bath County, Virginia, where he continued to paint until his death. Kendall was the recipient of numerous prizes and awards for his work; he was a member of the National Institute of Arts and Letters, and of the U.S. Commission of Fine Arts from 1920 to 1921. His papers from 1900 to 1936 are housed at the Smithsonian Archives of American Art.

Although mainly a painter, Kendall also modeled and carved sculptures throughout his career. His work is in the collection of the Metropolitan Museum of Art, the Pennsylvania Academy of the Fine Arts, the Museum of Fine Arts, Boston, and the Baltimore Museum of Art.

== Personal ==
Kendall's first wife was painter Margaret Weston Stickney, with whom he had three daughters. They divorced in 1921. Kendall had a romantic relationship with Yale student Christine Herter, whom he married in 1922, following his resignation from the university. They settled in Hot Springs, Virginia, and built a country house named Garth Newel. It is home to the Garth Newel Music Center, and was added to the National Register of Historic Places in 2013.

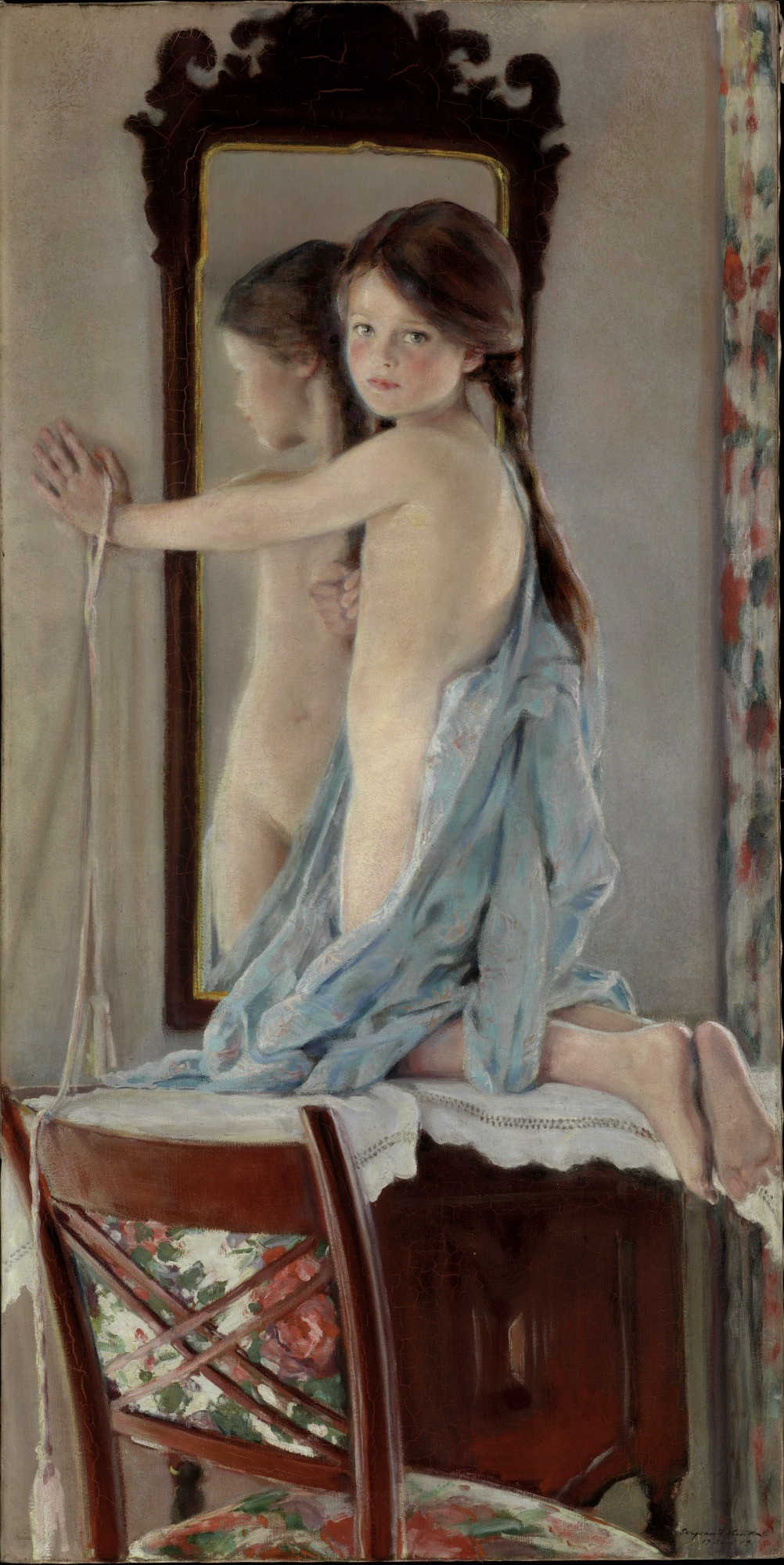
Crosslights - William Sergeant Kendall, Detroit Institute of the Arts

== Gallery ==
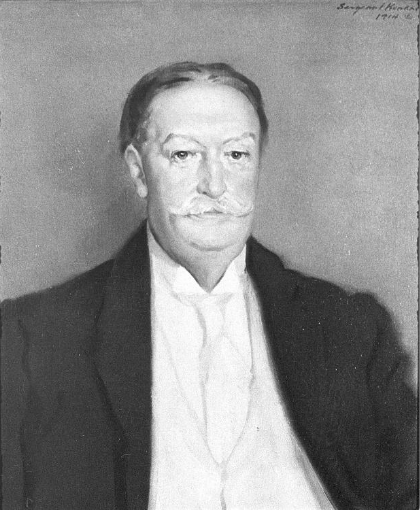
William Sergeant Kendall portrait of William Howard Taft, 1914

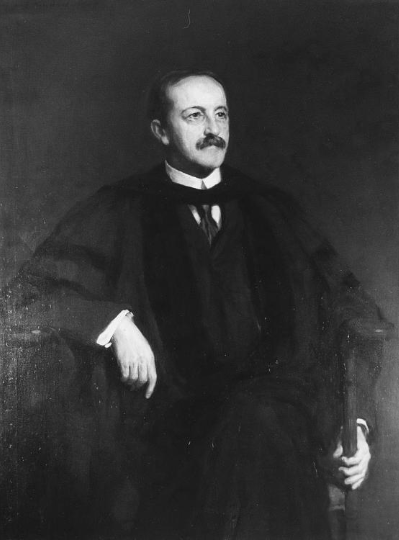
William Sergeant Kendall portrait of Theophil Mitchell Prudden, 1909
