= Theophil Mitchell Prudden =

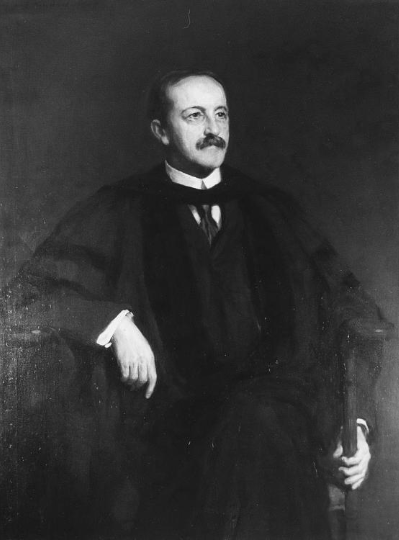
Portrait of Theophill Mitchell Prudden by William Sergeant Kendall, 1909

Theophil Mitchell Prudden (July 7, 1849 – April 10, 1924) was an American pathologist, born in Middlebury, Connecticut. He graduated from the Sheffield Scientific School, Yale, in 1872 and received his M. D. from Yale School of Medicine in 1875. He became an assistant (1879) and was professor of pathology (1892-1909) in the College of Physicians and Surgeons, Columbia University. In 1901, he was appointed as a director of the Rockefeller Institute for medical research.

He died of heart disease at his home in New York on April 10, 1924.^{[1]}

== Books ==
- A Manual of Normal Histology (1881)
- A Handbook of Pathological Anatomy and Histology (1885; ninth edition, 1911), with F. Delafield
- Story of the Bacteria (1889)
- Dust and its Dangers (1891)
- Drinking Water and Ice Supplies (1891)
- On the Great American Plateau
