= Rudolph John Anderson =

American biochemist (1879–1961)

Rudolph J. Anderson
- Born: September 13, 1879; Härna, Sweden
- Died: April 6, 1961 (aged 81)
- Education: Tulane University; University of Berlin; Cornell University
- Occupation: Biochemist
- Known for: Development of a Tuberculosis vaccine
- Awards: Trudeau Medal of the National Tuberculosis Association
- Scientific career
- Workplaces: Cornell University, Yale University
- Doctoral advisor: Hermann Leuchs, Graham Lusk

Rudolph John Anderson (1879–1961) was an American biochemist.

== Biography ==
=== Early life ===
Rudolph Anderson was born in 1879 in Härna, Sweden. At the age of 13, he moved to Boston where he attended an English grammar school from which he graduated by the time he turned 17. Deciding that continuing his education in High School was pointless for him, he started working on various industrial jobs during the day while studying during the night. That continued for several years, until, at one of the rubber manufacturing companies, he got a job as a laboratory boy and assistant to a chemist.

=== Turn of the Century ===
During the turn of the century, he got a chief chemist position at the manufacturing pharmaceutical company in New Orleans.

In 1906, he graduated from Tulane University and got his Ph.D. from Cornell University Medical College. In 1909, he came back to Sweden where he applied for doctoral program at University of Uppsala. The university declined his application, and Anderson, discouraged, went to the University of Berlin where he was accepted to Emil Fischer's laboratory. The laboratory was already full, and he was transported to Hermann Leuchs laboratory where he was solving the problem on the chemistry of color reaction of combination of brucine with nitric acid.

By 1911, Anderson completed the work for his doctoral degree but soon realized that he ran out of money. Fortunately his friend, Donald Dexter Van Slyke, received a letter from his father asking for recommendations. His father was a chief chemist at Agricultural Experiment Station in Geneva, New York and was seeking for a chemist there. Because he was recommended by his friend, Anderson went to Geneva, and soon after it was assigned to study cows metabolism. Later on he convinced the director that it would be important to know more about phytic acid before starting to experiment on dairy cows.

=== World War I ===
World War I interrupted his studies in Berlin, Germany and he needed to abandon it for a time being. Later on he returned to Geneva where he continued on his work on phytic acid but also expanded his research to include important fragrance oils that he found in animal urine. He spent several months working side by side with Graham Lusk at Cornell Medical College where he learned about animal calorimetry. During the war, he volunteered and later commissioned as a Captain for the Sanitary Corps in the Division of Food and Nutrition. In 1919, he was discharged from the army, but before returning to Geneva he completed the necessary requirements for his Ph.D. in Lusk's laboratory.

=== Post World War I ===
He was a chief biochemist and professor at Cornell University. Anderson researched dietary polyneuritis of poultry and the chemistry and genetics of grape pigments. He then focused his researched into nucleic acids of plants, but got carried away and left his focus onto the sterols present in the oils of plant seeds. In 1926 he was relocated to Yale University where he focused his research on isolating the sterols of the tubercle bacillus which resulted in the making of Tuberculosis vaccine. He became professor of chemistry at the same university and was retired as professor emeritus in 1948. He was elected as president of the American Society of Biological Chemists in 1941 and became a member of the National Academy of Sciences in 1946. The same year, he became a member of the Connecticut Academy of Sciences, and in 1947 he got M.D. degree from the University of Lund in Sweden. In 1948 he was awarded the Trudeau Medal from the National Tuberculosis Association, and in 1951 became an honorary member of the Connecticut Medical Society. During his lifetime, he was also a managing editor of Journal of Biological Chemistry from 1937 to 1958.
