= Christine Herter Kendall =

American painter

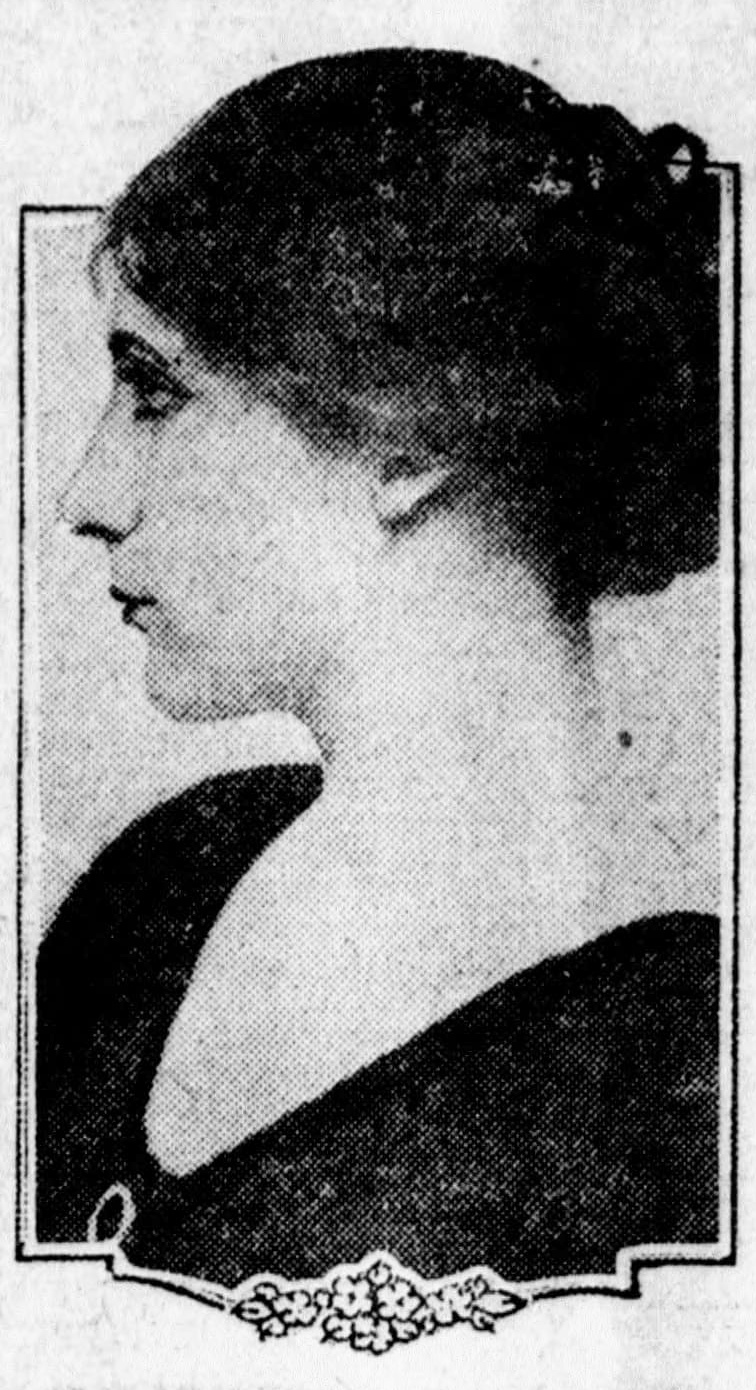
Christine Herter Kendall

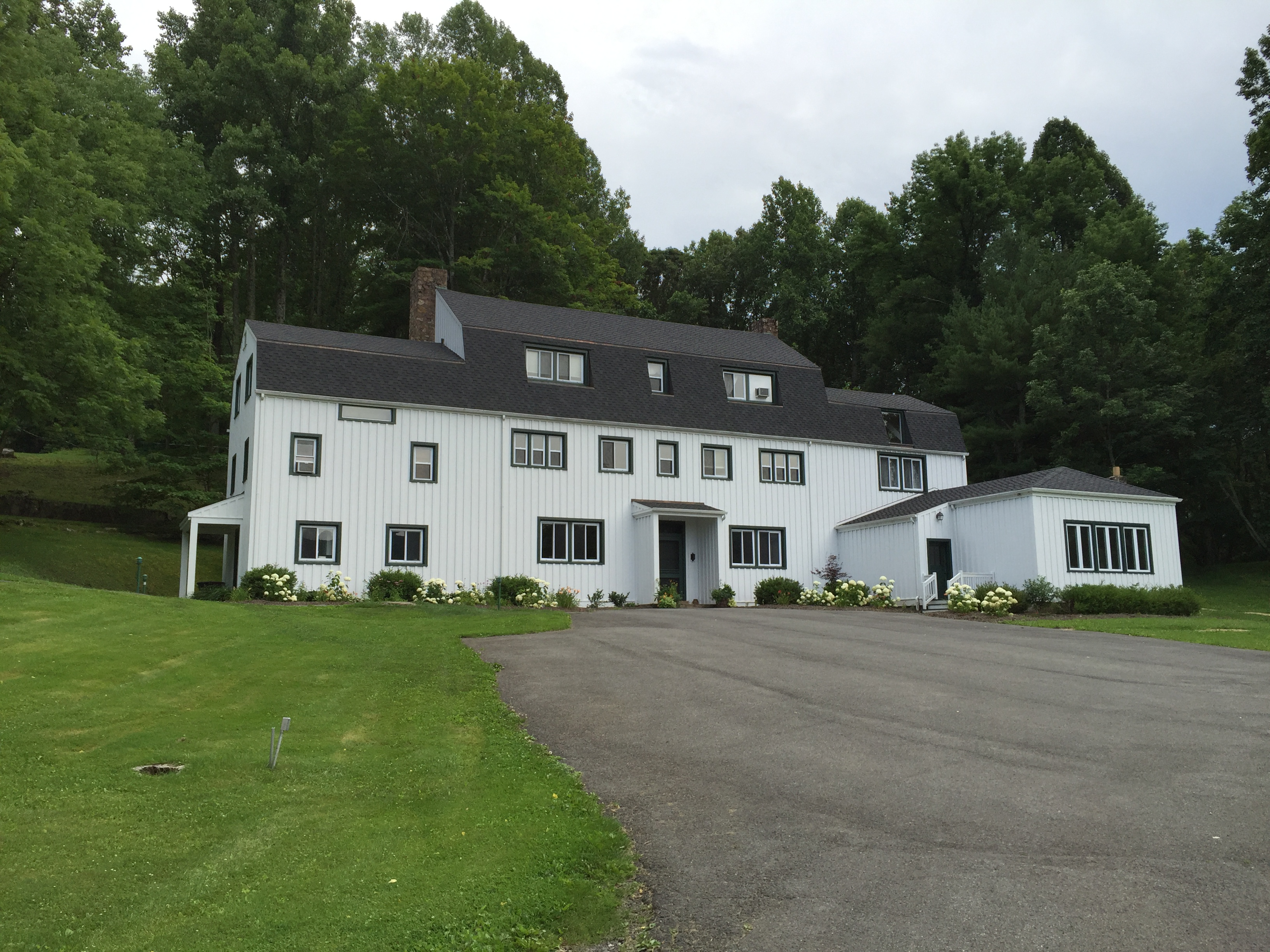
Garth Newel in 2016

Christine Herter Kendall (August 25, 1890 – June 22, 1981) was an American painter.

== Biography ==
The daughter of physician Christian Archibald Herter and Susan Dows Herter, she was born in Irvington-on-Hudson, New York. She had an older and a younger sister, and they grew up in a musical and artistic family in New York City. Her grandfather and great uncle had founded the interior design firm Herter Brothers, and her uncle was the noted painter Albert Herter. Her first cousin was the politician and diplomat Christian Herter.

Christine Herter studied art in New York and in Paris before enrolling at Yale University, from which she earned a BA in 1915. Among her Yale instructors was painter William Sergeant Kendall, with whom she began a romantic relationship. In 1921, Kendall divorced his wife, painter Margaret Weston Stickney, and left his three daughters. He resigned his position at Yale, and married Herter in 1922. In 1923, the couple purchased a 114-acre mountainside property in Bath County, Virginia. There they built a large house (completed 1924), with an artist's studio at each end, and named it Garth Newel ("New Hearth"). They raised Arabian horses on the farm, and hosted concerts and art events.

Her husband died in 1938, and she remained active in the local community, cofounding the Bath County Regional Art Show in 1964. With members of the Rowe String Quartet she established the Garth Newel Music Center in 1973. She bequeathed the house to the music center upon her death.

Christine Herter Kendall won a number of awards during her career. These included the popular vote prize from the Newport Art Association in 1915; the Second Hallgarten Prize from the National Academy of Design in 1916; and a prize from the National Association of Women Painters and Sculptors in 1922. She belonged to the latter association and the Newport Art Association, as well as to the New York Watercolor Club, and the American Federation of Arts. She was named one of the Virginia Women in History for 2014.

Garth Newel was added to the National Register of Historic Places in 2013.
