= Journal of Biological Chemistry =

Peer-reviewed scientific journal

- Discipline: Biochemistry; Molecular biology
- Language: English
- Edited by: Alex Toker

Publication details
- History: 1905–present
- Publisher: American Society for Biochemistry and Molecular Biology (United States)
- Frequency: Weekly
- Open access: Yes
- License: CC BY / CC BY-NC-ND
- Impact factor: 5.486 (2021)

Standard abbreviations
- ISO 4: J. Biol. Chem.

Indexing
- CODEN: JBCHA3
- ISSN: 0021-9258 (print); 1083-351X (web)
- LCCN: 06046735
- OCLC no.: 54114375

Links
- Journal homepage; Online access; Online archive

The Journal of Biological Chemistry (JBC) is a weekly peer-reviewed scientific journal that was established in 1905. Since 1925, it is published by the American Society for Biochemistry and Molecular Biology. It covers research in areas of biochemistry and molecular biology. The editor is Alex Toker. As of January 2021, the journal is fully open access. In press articles are available free on its website immediately after acceptance.

== Editors ==
The following individuals have served as editors of the journal:

- 1906–1909: John Jacob Abel and Christian Archibald Herter
- 1909–1910: Christian Archibald Herter
- 1910–1914: Alfred Newton Richards
- 1914–1925: Donald D. Van Slyke
- 1925–1936: Stanley R. Benedict. After Benedict died, John T. Edsall served as temporary editor until the next editor was appointed.
- 1937–1958: Rudolph J. Anderson
- 1958–1967: John T. Edsall
- 1968–1971: William Howard Stein
- 1971–2011: Herbert Tabor
- 2011–2015: Martha Fedor
- 2016–2021: Lila Gierasch
- 2021–Present: Alex Toker

== Ranking and criticism of impact factor ==
The editors of the Journal of Biological Chemistry have criticized the modern reliance upon the impact factor for ranking journals, noting that review articles, commentaries, and retractions are included in the calculation. Further, the denominator of total articles published encourages journals to be overly selective in what they publish, and preferentially publish articles which will receive more attention and citations.

Due to these factors, the journal's practice of publishing a broad cross-section of biochemistry articles has led it to suffer in impact factor, in 2006 ranking 260 of 6,164, while remaining a highly cited journal. When science journals were evaluated with a PageRank-based algorithm, however, the Journal of Biological Chemistry ranked first. Using the Eigenfactor metric, the Journal of Biological Chemistry ranked 5th among all ISI-indexed journals in 2010. The impact factor of the journal in 2021 was 5.486.

== History and classic papers ==
The journal was established in 1905 by John Jacob Abel and Christian Archibald Herter, who also served as the first editors; the first issue appeared in October 1905. The location of the journal's editorial offices has included Cornell Medical College (until 1937), Yale University (1937–1958), Harvard University (1958–1967), and New York City (from 1967). As of 2017 the journal is published by the American Society for Biochemistry and Molecular Biology.

The most cited paper of all time was published in the journal by Oliver H. Lowry on Protein measurement with the Folin phenol reagent and describes the Lowry protein assay, and has been cited well-over 300,000 times. In 1990, librarian Eugene Garfield wrote that the "Journal of Biological Chemistry lead the list of journals ranked by the number of SCI Top papers published", with 17 of the top 100 most cited papers published. The next journals on the list were Proceedings of the National Academy of Sciences, with 6, then Nature, with 5.

== Social media ==
The journal is very active on social media. In March, the journal hosts "Methods Madness," a tournament styled after March Madness. The event takes place on Twitter and lets users vote for their favorite biochemistry or molecular biology methods.
