= Margaret Stickney Kendall =

American painter and sculptor

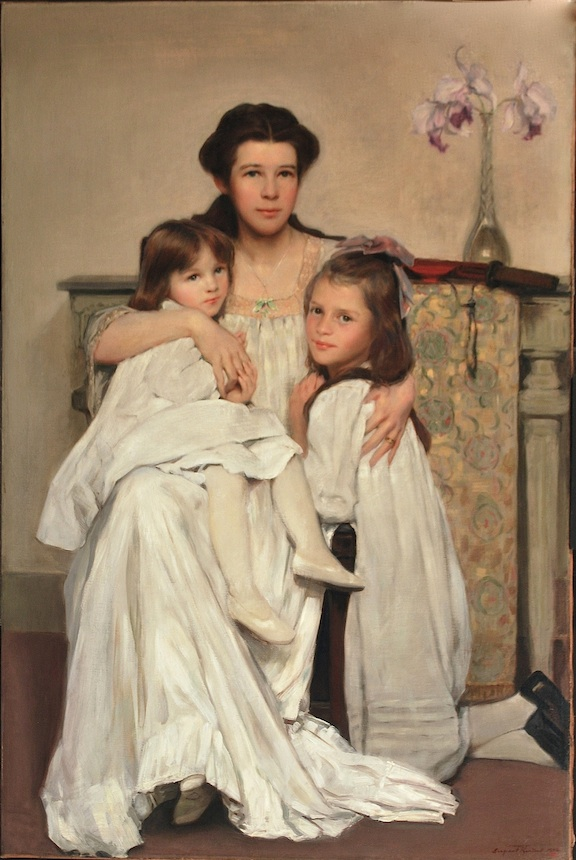
- A painting of Margaret Stickney Kendall and two of her daughters by William Sergeant Kendall
- Born: Margaret Weston Stickney
- Spouse: William Sergeant Kendall (married 1896-1921)

Margaret Stickney Kendall was an American painter and sculptor. She was married to fellow artist William Sergeant Kendall, and was a subject in many of his paintings.

== Life and career ==
During the mid-1890s, Margaret Stickney Kendall took a painting class taught by William Sergeant Kendall at Cooper Union. The couple married in early 1896 and had three daughters, Elisabeth, Beatrice, and Alison, born between 1896 and 1907.

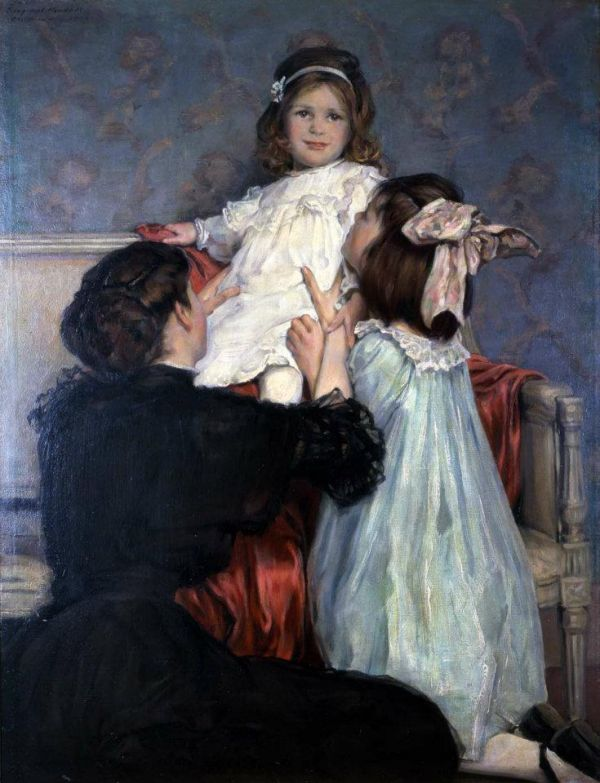
1909 painting by William Sergeant Kendall depicting Margaret Stickney Kendall and two of their daughters

Stickney Kendall and their daughters were the subjects of many of Sergeant Kendall's paintings.

The couple lived in the West Side of Manhattan from 1897 until 1906, when they moved to Barrytown, New York. In 1910, they moved to Marin Cottage in Newport, Rhode Island. The Kendalls moved to New Haven, Connecticut in 1913, when Sergeant Kendall earned a position at Yale University as dean of the School of Fine Arts.

In April 1915, Kendall published an essay in The Atlantic titled "A Personal Reflection on the Cost of Living." In 1919, the essay was published in book form by E.L. Hildreth & Co.

Stickney Kendall and William Sergeant Kendall divorced in 1921. The following year, Sergeant Kendall married painter Christine Herter, who had been his student at Yale.
