= Garth Newel Music Center =

- Interactive map of Garth Newel Music Center
- Address: Warm Springs, Virginia
- Coordinates: 38.024255°N 79.797993°W

Construction
- Opened: 1973

Website
- http://www.garthnewel.org

Garth Newel Music Center is a 501c3 not-for-profit educational institute located on a 114-acre mountainside property near Hot Springs in Bath County, Virginia. Recipient of the 2012 CMAcclaim Award from Chamber Music America for their contributions to the field of chamber music, Garth Newel Music Center celebrated its 40th anniversary in the summer of 2013.

Garth Newel, a Welsh phrase meaning "new hearth" or "new home," was the name given to the property in the 1920s by William Sergeant Kendall and Christine Herter Kendall.

Home to the Garth Newel Piano Quartet, the Center offers over 60 concerts annually. The annual Summer Chamber Music Festival, which takes place on weekends between late June and Labor Day, features twenty performances by the quartet and their guests and performances by Fellowship (student) ensembles.

Other annual performances include three three-day "Fall Foliage" concert weekends each October; Thanksgiving and New Year's Holiday Weekends; wintertime "pub" concerts, and three concert weekends each May, as well as the annual Virginia Blues and Jazz Festival each June and an American Made concert series that features bluegrass, old time and other traditional American music forms.

Recent Music Center musical guests have included: The Parker String Quartet, Ensō, Dadealus and Borromeo String Quartets.

== Garth Newel Piano Quartet ==
As artists-in-residence at Garth Newel Music Center, the Garth Newel Piano Quartet performs over 50 concerts each year.

The Quartet has performed throughout the United States and on five continents as a quartet and individually. Recent tours have included concerts at New York's Carnegie Hall, the Corcoran Gallery, Strathmore Hall, Virginia Military Institute, The Lyceum in Alexandria, Williamsburg Chamber Music Society, Washington Conservatory of Music, the University of Memphis, and the San Diego Chamber Music Workshop.

In 2012, the quartet traveled to Turkey where they gave a lengthy performance tour. In 2014, they traveled to Croatia where they spent over a week performing.

The Garth Newel Piano Quartet serve as faculty for the Garth Newel Summer Fellowship Program for college-age musicians and work regularly with local public schools. They also coach adult and student ensembles and host the Garth Newel Amateur Chamber Music Workshop each March.

== Education ==
The Garth Newel Music Center plays host to numerous programs for young musicians. The Allegheny Mountain String Project is partnered with the music center and rehearses and performs there several times a year. The quartet regularly performs at schools around the country and the Appomattox Regional Governor's School orchestra attends a weekend of workshops with the quartet every spring. Garth Newel also hosts an Amateur Retreat every spring. Each summer, college and conservatory students from around the world journey to Garth Newel to attend the Young Artists Fellowship program where they spend a month in rehearsals and master classes that culminate in a final performance here at the music center.

== Artists ==
- Teresa Ling, violin
- Fitz Gary, viola
- Isaac Melamed, cellist
- Jeannette Fang, pianist

Former members of the quartet include Evelyn Grau and Genevieve Feiwen Lee.

The quartet has recorded two CDs featuring masterworks of the piano quartet repertoire: Mozart's Quartet in G minor, KV 478 and the Brahms Quartet in G minor, Opus 25, Dvorak's Quartet in E-flat Major, Opus 87 and the lesser-known Czech work, Bohuslav Martinu's Quartet No. 1.

The music center has been featured in a number of video segments in the series entitled 'In A Day's Drive' over the years.

== Garth Newel ==
- Garth Newel
- U.S. National Register of Historic Places
- Virginia Landmarks Register
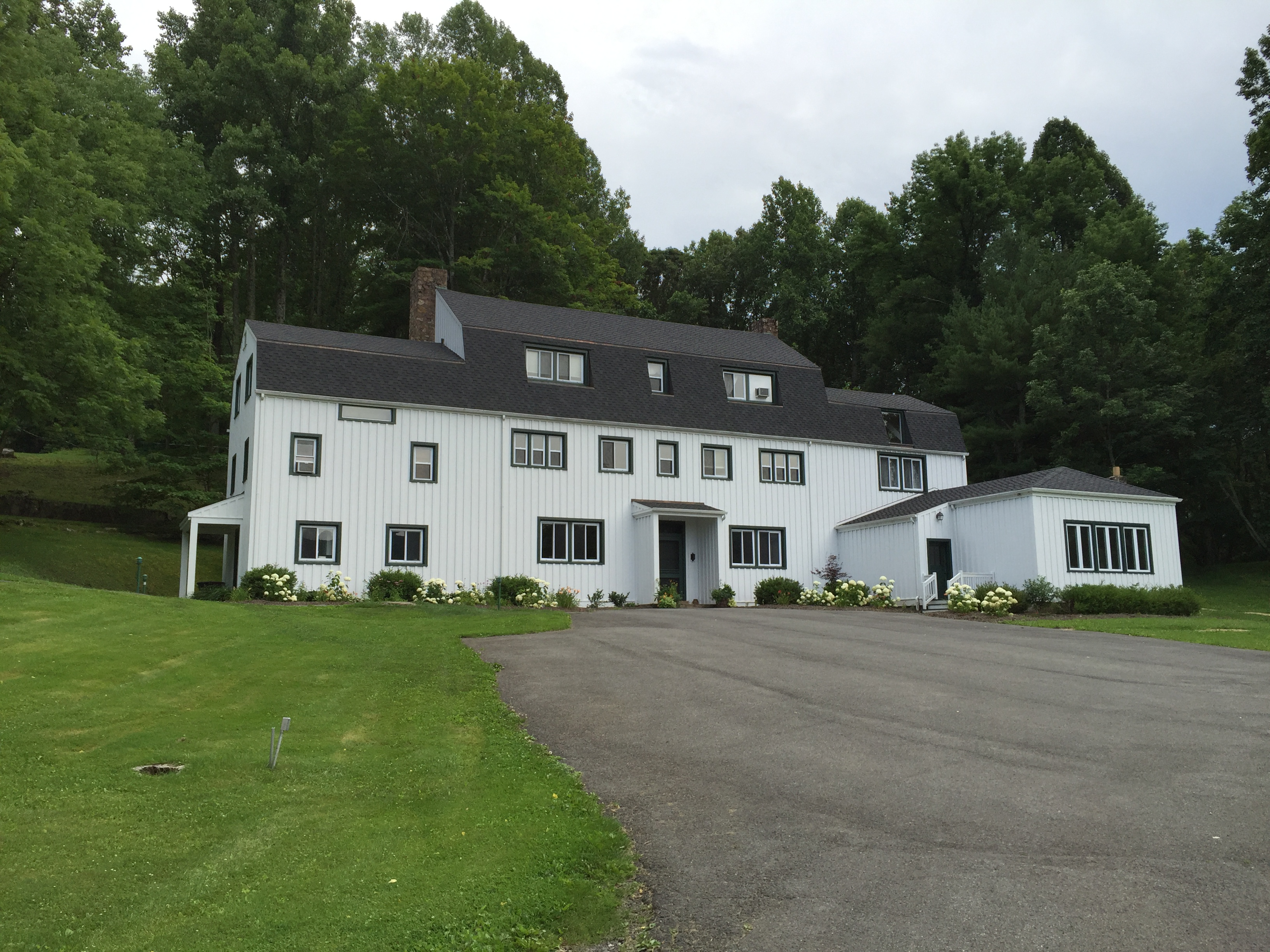

- Location within Virginia Location within the United States
- Location: 447 Garth Newel Ln., near Hot Springs, Virginia
- Coordinates: 38°01′34″N 79°48′01″W
- Area: 114.33 acres (46.27 ha)
- Built: 1923-1924, c. 1925, 1954
- Architect: Lee, Merrill Clifford and Clifton Lee, Jr., Lee & Lee; Fitzgibbon, James Walter
- NRHP reference No.: 13000402
- VLR No.: 008-0027

Significant dates
- Added to NRHP: June 19, 2013
- Designated VLR: September 19, 2013

Garth Newel is a historic home located near Hot Springs, Bath County, Virginia. The main house was built in 1923–1924, and consists of a three-story central block flanked by 2 1/2-story wings. Each section is topped by a gambrel roof and entirely clad in rough-sawn vertical board and batten. Also on the property are a number of contributing cottages and outbuildings, including Entrance Piers (c. 1925), Woodzell Cottage (c. 1925), Kendall House (1954), Giles Cottage (c. 1925), Arabian Horse Barn (c. 1925), Indoor Riding Arena/Herter Hall (c. 1925), Fire Pit (c. 1925), and Stone Retaining Wall/Steps (c. 1925).

Garth Newel was built by artist William Sergeant Kendall (1869-1938) and his second wife Christine Herter Kendall (1890-1981). Together they built the estate beginning in 1923, shortly after their permanent move to Virginia. For the remainder of their lives, Garth Newel was their focus, providing them a rural yet sophisticated estate at which they painted, raised award-winning Arabian horses, and participated in the elite society of Bath County. They were also known for hosting small concerts in the main residence at Garth Newel.

The complex was added to the National Register of Historic Places in 2013.

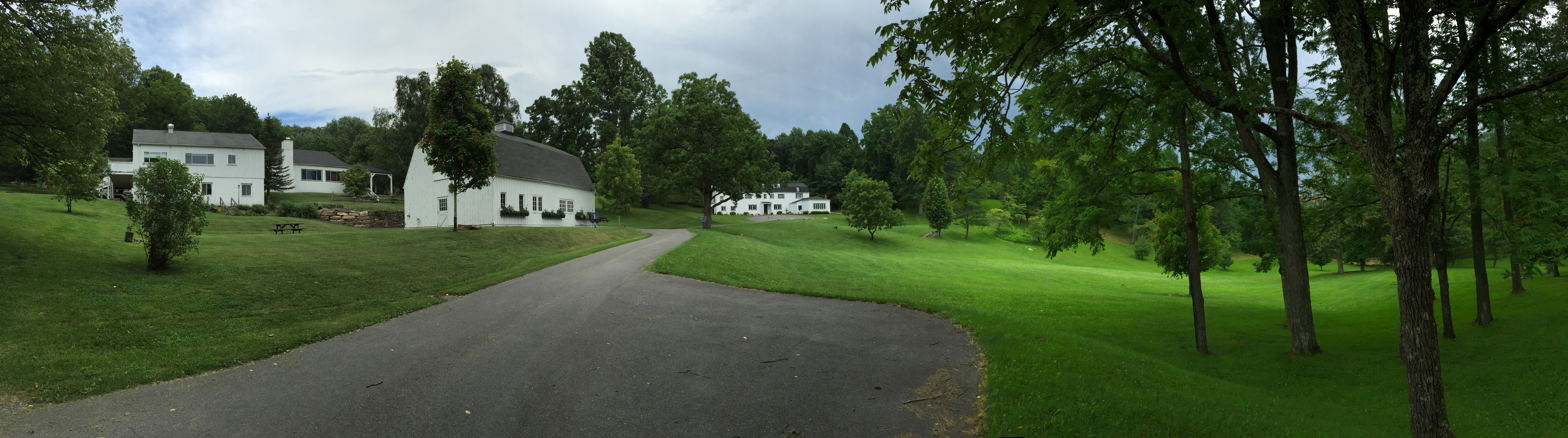
Panoramic image of Garth Newel and some of its outbuildings in 2016
