= James Sherley =

American biological engineer

James Sherley is a biological engineer and the founder of Asymmetrex, an adult stem cell research center. He has also conducted research at the Boston Biomedical Research Institute and Massachusetts Institute of Technology (MIT). Sherley filed a suit against the government in Sherley v. Sebelius, resulting in a protracted legal battle attempting to ban the government from funding any research relating to embryonic stem cells.

== Early life and education ==
Sherley's education includes a B.S. from Harvard University and an M.D. and a Ph.D. from Johns Hopkins University School of Medicine, Baltimore, Maryland. He was a postdoctoral fellow with Arnold J. Levine, at Princeton University, Princeton, New Jersey 1988 to 1991. From 1991 to 1998 he was associate member, division of medical science, molecular oncology group, Fox Chase Cancer Center, Philadelphia, Pennsylvania. He was a professor in biological engineering division at Massachusetts Institute of Technology from 1998 to 2007.

== Career ==
His awards include a 1993 Pew Scholar award and recipient of a 2006 NIH Director's Pioneer Award.

In December 2006, Sherley announced he would protest MIT's decision to not grant him tenure by going on a hunger strike. He ended the strike 12 days later. He subsequently asserted that he would continue to show up for work on July 1, 2007, despite no longer having a job at MIT on that date. Twenty senior faculty members who participated in evaluation of his tenure case issued a public statement saying that Sherley's evaluation was conducted with integrity and that he was treated fairly.

Sherley, an African-American, was one of 23 black professors at MIT. As of October 2006, of the 988 faculty members, 165 or about 17% are ethnic minorities. He has stated that he believes that MIT has not given him the freedom to challenge scientific orthodoxy the way the institution would have for a white colleague. Some other colleagues and professors have defended Sherley, including MIT linguistics professor Noam Chomsky and Harvard medical school's George M. Church. Frank L. Douglas, then the director of the Center for Biomedical Innovation, resigned from the university as a result of the handling of the case.

== Stem cell research ==
He is open about his opposition to human embryonic stem cell research, and instead, Sherley's research focuses on the molecular and biochemical mechanisms of adult stem cells. In 2006 he stated that cloning human embryos was wrong and that the research from embryonic stem cell research would not lead to a cure all. "Despite similar misinformation to the contrary, adult stem cell research is a viable and vibrant path to new medical therapies. Even calling them an alternative to embryonic stem cells misinforms the public."

In 2010, Sherley was the named plaintiff in Sherley v. Sebelius against Kathleen Sebelius, director of HHS, and Francis Collins, director of the NIH, a case challenging federal (NIH) funding of embryonic stem cell research that resulted in a suspension of much of the NIH funded research on embryonic stem cells. He fought to ban the NIH from funding any research related to embryonic stem cells, and claimed that the decision of the federal government to pay for research on embryonic stem cells was "essentially robbing him of grant money by increasing the competition for funding". After three years of legal effort, the supreme court refused to overturn a lower judge's ruling against Sherley, allowing research to proceed.

Sherley has likened abortion to racism, claiming that it is "discriminating against human embryos, just like there is discrimination against people of different culture and races".

While working at the Boston Biomedical Research Institute in 2009, Sherley founded a stem cell research center known as Asymmetrex.
