= Christian Archibald Herter (physician) =

American physician and pathologist

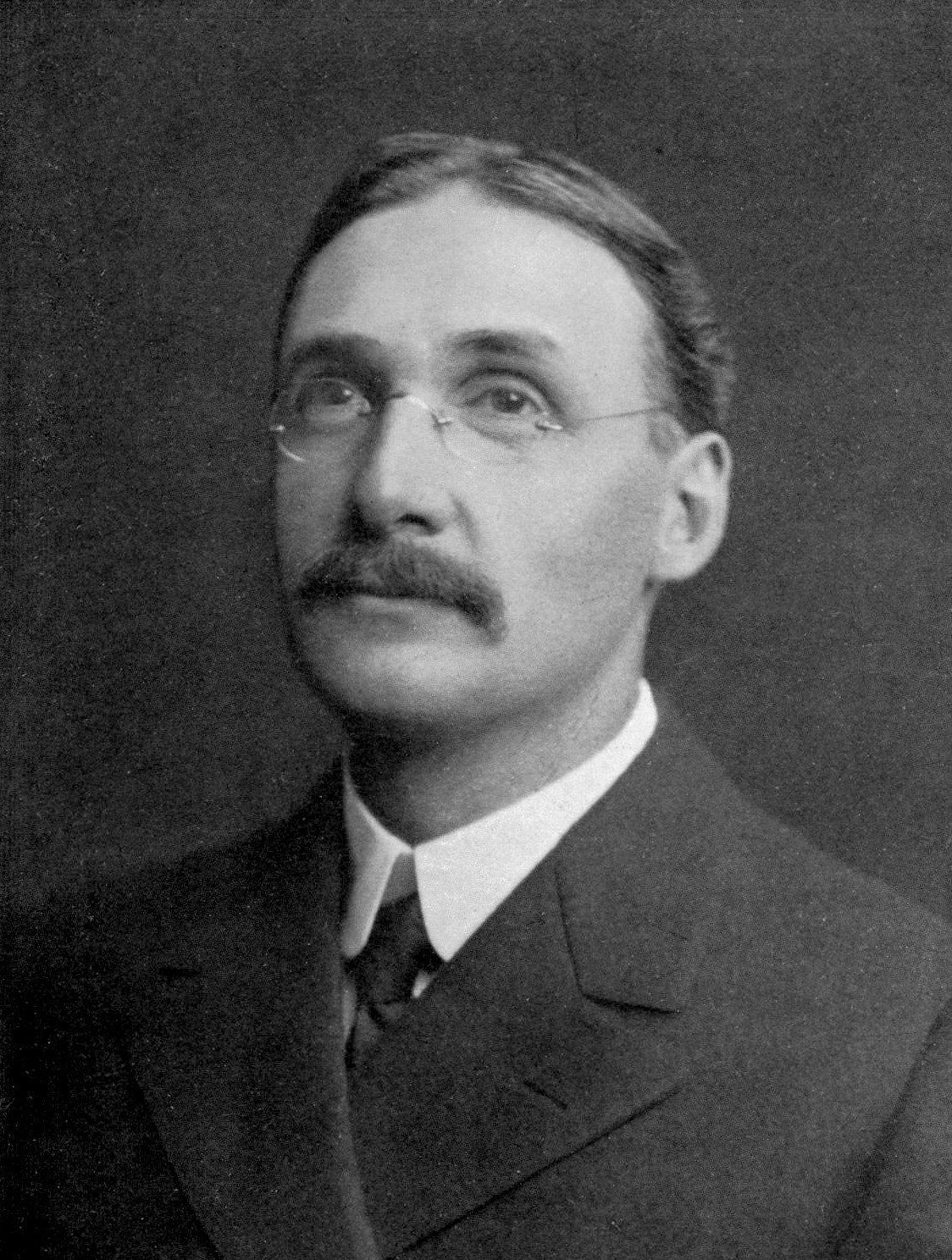
- Born: September 3, 1865; Glenville, Connecticut
- Died: December 5, 1910 (aged 45)
- Education: College of Physicians and Surgeons at Columbia University
- Known for: gastrointestinal tract
- Scientific career
- Fields: pathologist
- Doctoral advisor: William H. Welch

Christian Archibald Herter (September 3, 1865 – December 5, 1910) was an American physician and pathologist noted for his work on diseases of the gastrointestinal tract. He was co-founder of the Journal of Biological Chemistry.

== Life ==
Christian Archibald Herter was born in Glenville, Connecticut. His father, also Christian Herter, was a notable and wealthy artist and interior designer, head of the Herter Brothers. He was privately educated and began his medical degree at the early age of 15. By the age of 18, he had received an MD from the College of Physicians and Surgeons at Columbia University. He studied pathology under William H. Welch at Johns Hopkins University and traveled to Zurich to study under Auguste-Henri Forel.

Herter initially practiced mainly neurological medicine in New York City. His experience was captured in The Diagnosis of Diseases of the Nervous System, a manual he wrote for "students and practitioners" in 1892. Herter's interest in laboratory medicine led him to relinquish his medical practice and build a laboratory in the fourth floor of his house on 819 Madison Avenue. In 1897, he was appointed professor of Pathological Chemistry at University and Bellevue Hospital Medical College. His lectures were published in 1902.

Herter returned to his alma mater in 1903 as Professor of Pharmacology and Therapeutics. It was during this time that he researched diseases of the gastrointestinal tract. His work on celiac disease, which he called "intestinal infantilism", led to the eponym Gee-Herter disease. His important contribution was to highlight the retarded growth of affected children. Herter's theory as to the cause – that it was due to overgrowth and persistence of gram-positive bacterial flora normally belonging to the nursling period – failed to gain acceptance. However, he did correctly identify that any "attempt to encourage growth by the use of increased amounts of carbohydrates" led to relapse. This would later be discovered to be due to the gluten content of wheat.

Herter was instrumental in the organization of the Rockefeller Institute for Medical Research and was on its original Board of Scientific Directors.

In 1905, along with John Jacob Abel, he co-founded and edited the Journal of Biological Chemistry. Herter financed the loss-making journal until his death, whereupon a fund was created in his memory to support it.

Herter married Susan Dows in 1885, and fathered three daughters (Mary, Christine, and Susan), and two sons died in infancy. Mary Dows became a noted publisher, Christine Herter became a painter, and Susan married the artist Ernest Benham Dielman. Christian Herter died aged 45 of a neurological wasting disease, possibly myasthenia gravis or hypokalemic periodic paralysis, the latter of which is exacerbated by carbohydrates. Henry Drysdale Dakin, who had worked in Herter's lab since 1905, married Herter's widow in 1916. They moved the house and laboratory in the 1920s to a newly constructed estate named Edgehill, at Scarborough-on-Hudson, near Scarsdale, New York and continued Herter's unfinished research.

== The Christian A. Herter Lectures ==
In 1903, Herter established a memorial lectureship in remembrance of his second son Albert, who died the previous year at the age of 2. In addition, he established a similar lectureship at the Johns Hopkins School of Medicine. The lecture series began in 1904 and has continued yearly since.

The lectures are given at the New York University School of Medicine, under the sponsorship of the Department of Biochemsitry. The lecturers are by invitation, and over the years have included some of the most illustrious members of the scientific community, such as Nobel Prize laureates Albrecht Kossel and Konrad Emil Bloch.

== Publications ==
- The Diagnosis of Diseases of the Nervous System: A Manual for Students and Practitioners. G.P. Putnam's Sons. New York and London, 1892.
- Lectures on Chemical Pathology in its Relation to Practical Medicine. Smith, Elder & Co. Philadelphia, 1902.
- The Influence of Pasteur on medical science. Dodd, Mead & Co. 1904.
- The Common Bacterial Infections of the Digestive Tract and the Intoxications Arising from Them. Macmillan. New York, 1907.
- On Infantilism from Chronic Intestinal Infection. Macmillan. New York, 1908.
- Imagination and Idealism in the Medical Sciences. American Medical Association. 1910.
- Biological Aspects of Human Problems. Macmillan. New York, 1911.
