= The Yard (Hot Springs, Virginia) =

Historic house in Virginia, United States

- U.S. National Register of Historic Places
- Virginia Landmarks Register
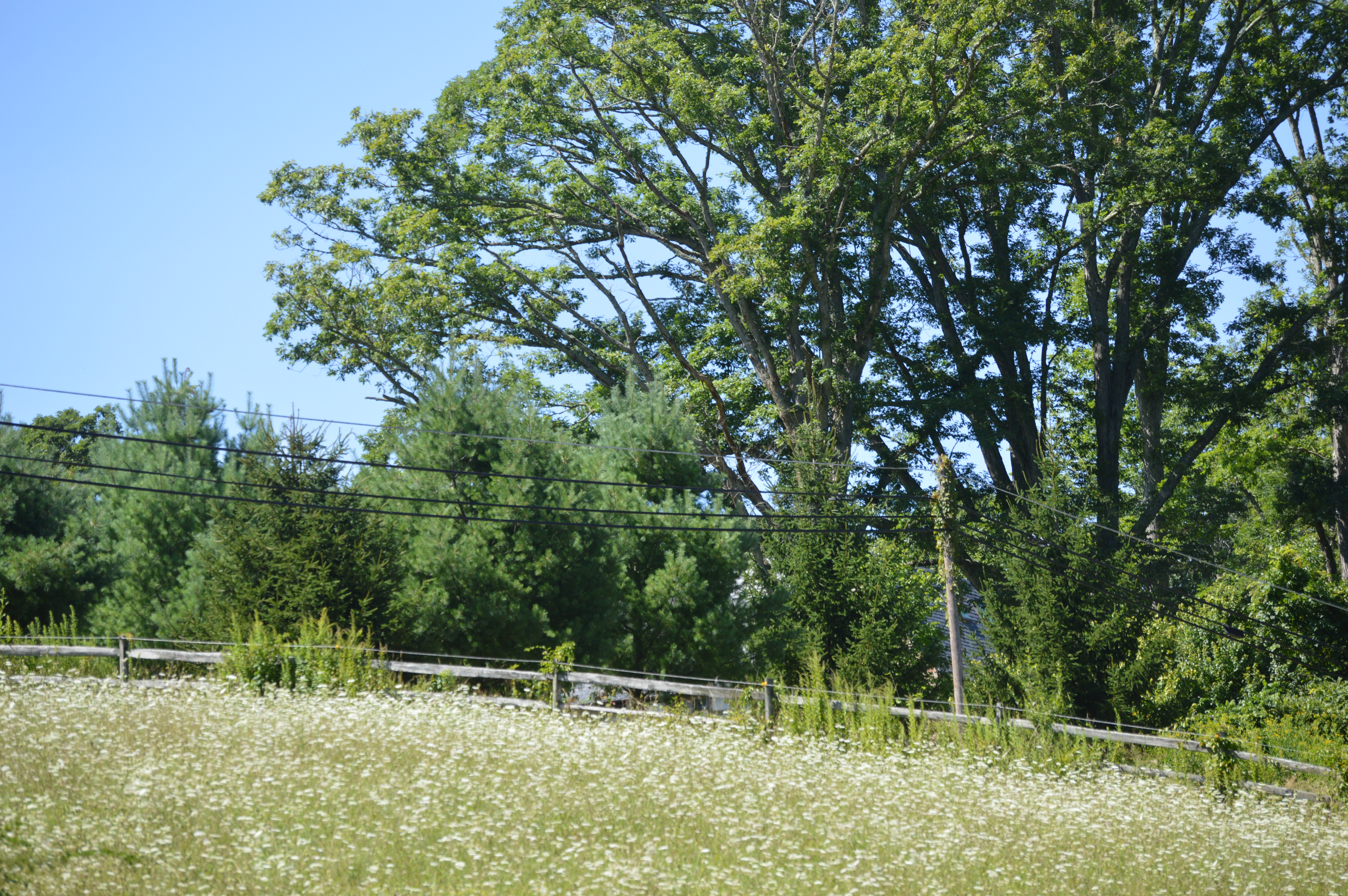
- Distant view from south

- Location within Virginia Location within the United States
- Location: 381 Old Greenhouse Rd., Hot Springs, Virginia
- Coordinates: 37°55′16″N 79°53′27″W
- Area: 12.2 acres (4.9 ha)
- Built: 1925
- Architect: Short, C.W.; Matthews, Stanley
- Architectural style: Tudor Revival
- NRHP reference No.: 07000050
- VLR No.: 008-0135

Significant dates
- Added to NRHP: February 13, 2007
- Designated VLR: September 6, 2006

The Yard is a historic estate home located near Hot Springs, Bath County, Virginia. It was built in 1925, and is a large, Tudor Revival style dwelling. The plan features an inner courtyard surrounded on three sides by two-story, one-room-deep wings, with the remaining side at one-story. It is constructed of stone and half-timbered stucco, capped by a slate gable roof and punctuated by leaded glass casement windows and doors. Also on the property are a contributing former foxhound kennel and chauffeur's shed.

It was listed on the National Register of Historic Places in 2007.
