= Switchback School =

- U.S. National Register of Historic Places
- Virginia Landmarks Register
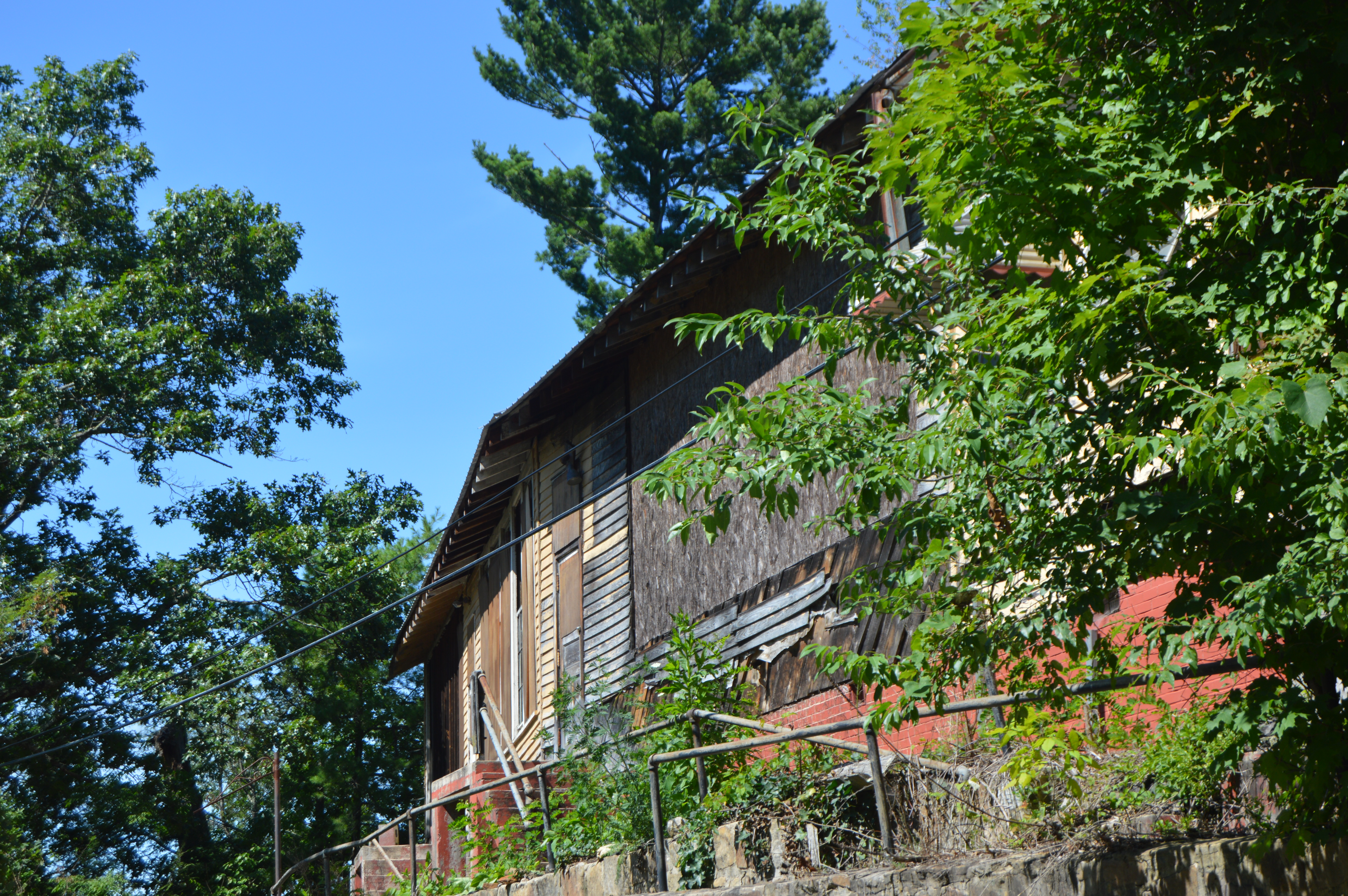
- Western side of the school

- Location within Virginia Location within the United States
- Location: 210 Pinehurst Heights Rd., near Hot Springs, Virginia
- Coordinates: 38°00′42″N 79°50′34″W
- Area: 0.9 acres (0.36 ha)
- Built: 1924-1925, 1933, c. 1960
- Architect: Rosenwald Fund
- MPS: Rosenwald Schools in Virginia MPS
- NRHP reference No.: 13000985
- VLR No.: 008-5042

Significant dates
- Added to NRHP: December 24, 2013
- Designated VLR: September 19, 2013

Switchback School, also known as Union Hurst School, is a historic Rosenwald school located near Hot Springs, Bath County, Virginia. It was built in 1924–1925, and is a one-story, frame, graded two-teacher type of public school. It is sheathed in weatherboard and has a side-gable roof. A major addition at the south end was built in 1933 and a second addition was built about 1960. Also on the property are a contributing privy (c. 1950); a cistern constructed as part of a Civilian Conservation Corps site improvement project (late-1930s); and three stone walls built by the workers from the Works Progress Administration (late-1930s). It is one of approximately 70 Rosenwald schools that survive of the 364 that were built across Virginia for the education of African-American students.

It was added to the National Register of Historic Places in 2013.
