= Hot Springs, Virginia =

- Census-designated place
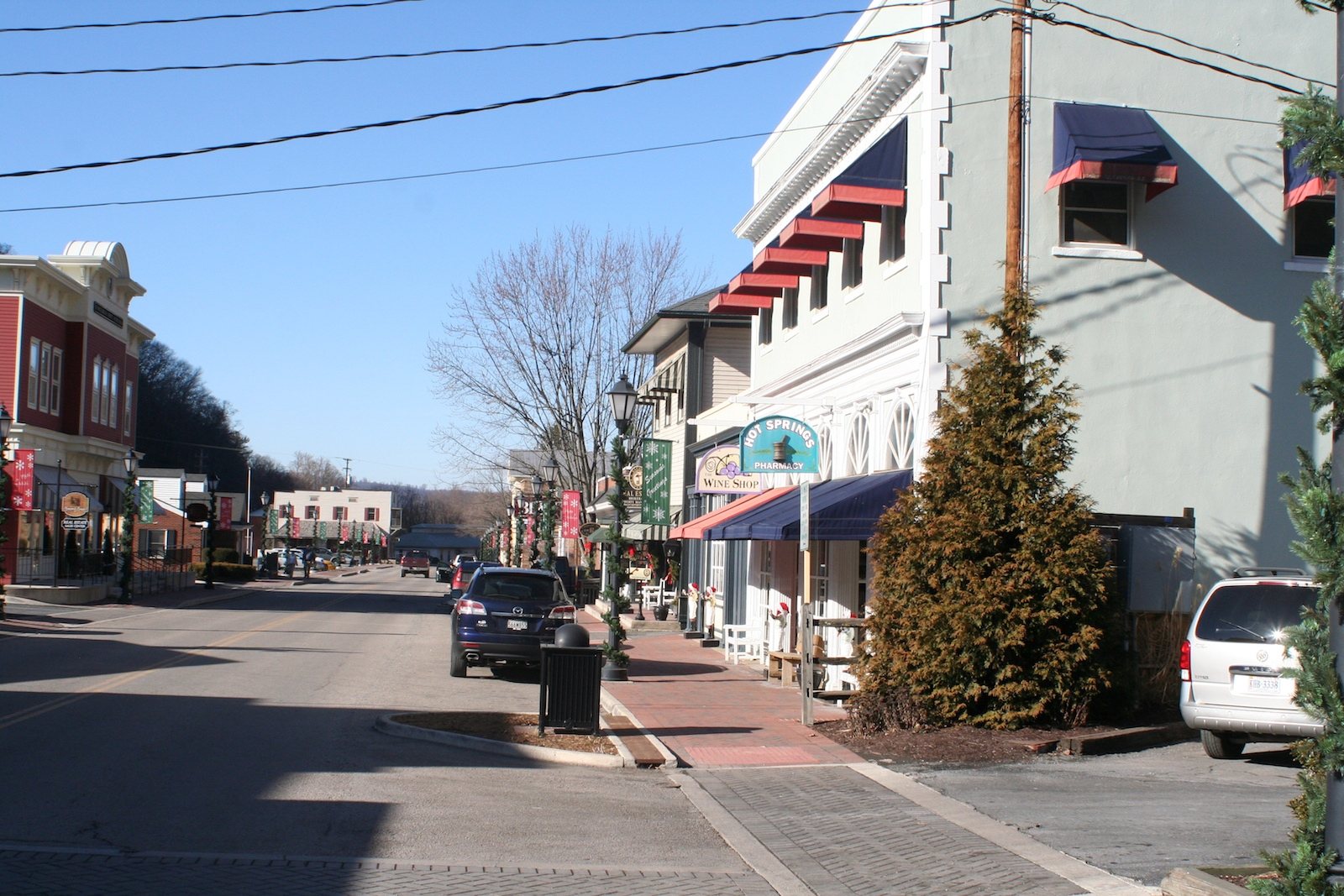
- Downtown Hot Springs in the late 2000s

- Location within the U.S. state of Virginia Hot Springs, Virginia (the United States)
- Coordinates: 37°59′59″N 79°49′56″W
- Country: United States
- State: Virginia
- County: Bath

Population (2010)
  - Total: 738
- Time zone: UTC−5 (Eastern (EST))
  - Summer (DST): UTC−4 (EDT)
- ZIP codes: 24445

Hot Springs is a census-designated place (CDP) in Bath County, Virginia, United States. The population as of the 2020 Census was 524. It is located about 5 miles (8 kilometers) southwest of Warm Springs on U.S. Route 220.

Hot Springs has several historic resorts, for the springs helped develop Bath County.

== History ==
Since at least the mid-18th century, travelers came to use the springs. Thomas Bullitt built the first inn to accommodate them in 1766 and Dr. Thomas Goode later expanded it. The most prominent modern resort, The Homestead, traces its origin to this inn. Mustoe House, The Yard, Barton Lodge, Switchback School, and Garth Newel are also listed on the National Register of Historic Places.

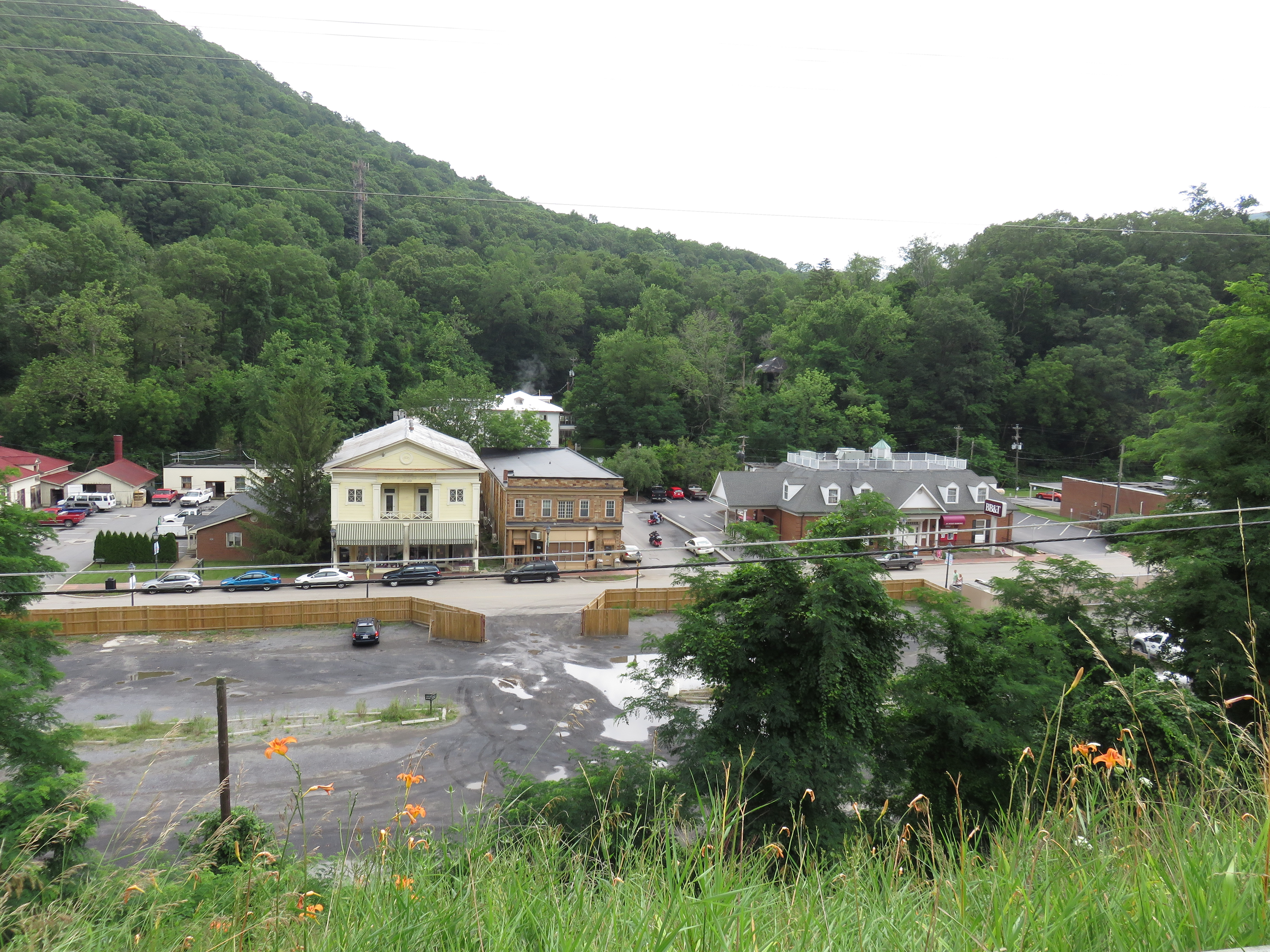
Downtown Hot Springs from above

In 1943, during World War II, The Homestead hosted a United Nations conference which implemented the foundation of Food and Agriculture Organization.

From December 1941 until June 1942, following the United States' entry into World War II, the Homestead served as a high-end internment camp for 785 Japanese diplomats and their families until they could be exchanged through neutral channels for their American counterparts. The diplomats were later transferred to the Greenbrier Hotel in West Virginia.

Hot Springs was once the terminus of the Chesapeake & Ohio Railroad's Hot Springs Branch, which extended from Covington in Alleghany County to Hot Springs in large part passenger service to serve the resort in Hot Springs, though other customers were served, including lumber companies. There was a turntable in Hot Springs that reversed the train for the return trip back. The C&O once considered extending the line into West Virginia to serve the logging industry, but decided to build its Greenbrier Division in West Virginia instead.

By 1975, the C&O abandoned the branch line, and a tourist railroad, the Allegany Central, was to start. However, the Homestead resort decided it no longer wanted the railroad or the tourist line to extend to Hot Springs, so the rails were torn up to the Bath County line. In 1984, the tourist railroad ended and a rail trail, Jackson River Scenic Trail was subsequently built on the line in Alleghany County but was not extended by Bath County to Hot Springs to follow the full length of C&O's Hot Springs Branch. One of the original steam engines that served the Hot Springs Branch is preserved in Covington, Virginia.

== Climate ==
Hot springs has a humid continental climate of type (Dfb) bordering on type (Dfa). It also borders on a humid subtropical climate (Cfa).

Climate data for Hot Springs, Virginia (1991–2020 normals, extremes 1893–present)
Month	Jan	Feb	Mar	Apr	May	Jun	Jul	Aug	Sep	Oct	Nov	Dec	Year
Record high °F (°C)	73 (23)	77 (25)	83 (28)	89 (32)	94 (34)	97 (36)	99 (37)	100 (38)	95 (35)	90 (32)	79 (26)	75 (24)	100 (38)
Mean daily maximum °F (°C)	39.8 (4.3)	43.7 (6.5)	52.4 (11.3)	64.2 (17.9)	72.2 (22.3)	78.8 (26.0)	82.1 (27.8)	80.4 (26.9)	74.1 (23.4)	64.0 (17.8)	52.8 (11.6)	42.9 (6.1)	62.3 (16.8)
Daily mean °F (°C)	30.6 (−0.8)	33.5 (0.8)	41.0 (5.0)	51.5 (10.8)	60.0 (15.6)	67.6 (19.8)	71.1 (21.7)	69.7 (20.9)	63.3 (17.4)	52.5 (11.4)	42.1 (5.6)	34.1 (1.2)	51.4 (10.8)
Mean daily minimum °F (°C)	21.5 (−5.8)	23.3 (−4.8)	29.6 (−1.3)	38.8 (3.8)	47.9 (8.8)	56.4 (13.6)	60.2 (15.7)	59.1 (15.1)	52.6 (11.4)	41.0 (5.0)	31.3 (−0.4)	25.4 (−3.7)	40.6 (4.8)
Record low °F (°C)	−20 (−29)	−14 (−26)	−2 (−19)	10 (−12)	18 (−8)	25 (−4)	35 (2)	32 (0)	22 (−6)	14 (−10)	0 (−18)	−20 (−29)	−20 (−29)
Average precipitation inches (mm)	3.64 (92)	3.13 (80)	4.31 (109)	4.30 (109)	4.69 (119)	4.31 (109)	4.22 (107)	3.59 (91)	4.13 (105)	3.14 (80)	3.35 (85)	3.69 (94)	46.50 (1,181)
Average snowfall inches (cm)	8.0 (20)	7.0 (18)	4.6 (12)	0.5 (1.3)	0.0 (0.0)	0.0 (0.0)	0.0 (0.0)	0.0 (0.0)	0.0 (0.0)	0.1 (0.25)	0.6 (1.5)	4.5 (11)	25.3 (64)
Average precipitation days (≥ 0.01 in)	10.5	9.5	11.3	12.6	14.3	12.3	12.5	11.0	9.4	8.8	8.9	10.5	131.6
Average snowy days (≥ 0.1 in)	2.6	2.7	1.5	0.3	0.0	0.0	0.0	0.0	0.0	0.0	0.4	1.9	9.4
Source: NOAA

== Demographics ==
Historical population
Census	Pop.	Note	%±
2020	524		—
U.S. Decennial Census; 2010 2020

Hot Springs was first listed as a census designated place in the 2010 U.S. census.
