= Frank L. Douglas =

Guyanese-American biomedical researcher and business executive

- Born: April 30, 1943 (age 83); Georgetown, Guyana
- Education: Lehigh University (BS); Cornell University (PhD, MD)
- Scientific career
- Fields: Pharmaceuticals
- Website: freemanblackstream.com

Frank Lennox Douglas (born April 30, 1943) is a Guyanese-American biomedical researcher and business executive.

== Education and career ==
Douglas was born April 30, 1943, in Georgetown, Guyana. He graduated with a BS in Engineering from Lehigh University in 1966. He went on to a PhD in Physical Chemistry from Cornell University, which he received at the beginning of 1973, with a thesis on chlorophyll-a. After a brief stint working at Xerox, Douglas moved to New York City to pursue a medical degree from the Cornell University Medical School. After finishing the MD, Douglas completed an internship and residency in internal medicine at Johns Hopkins Medical Institution, and a fellowship in neuroendocrinology at the National Institutes of Health.

Following his fellowship, Douglas took a position as an assistant professor of medicine at the University of Chicago, in which role he remained for 5 years. At this time, he also began work at the pharmaceutical company Ciba-Geigy. In 1992, he moved as an executive vice president to Marion Merrell Dow, where he remained as it was acquired and changed names to Hoechst Marion Roussel, and later to Aventis.

In 2005, Douglas left Aventis and took a position as a professor of the practice at Massachusetts Institute of Technology, where he was involved in founding the Center for Biomedical Innovation. After 2 years at MIT, he resigned over concerns about institutional racism, particularly regarding the tenure-denial of James Sherley.

In 2009, Douglas moved to Akron, Ohio, to serve as president and CEO of the Austen BioInnovation Institute. He left the institute at the beginning of 2015.

Douglas published an autobiography in 2018, titled Defining Moments of a Free Man from a Black Stream.

== Books ==
- Douglas, Frank L. (2018). Defining Moments of a Free Man from a Black Stream. Dorrance Publishing. ISBN 978-1-4809-9481-2.

== Honors and awards ==
- Geoffrey Beene Foundation and GQ Magazine Rock Star of Science, 2010
- Black History Makers Award, 2007
- Plakette des Fachbereichs Medizin (Medal of the Faculty of Medicine), Goethe University Frankfurt, 2004
