= Alex Toker =

Prof. Alex Toker
- Education: University of London; National Institute for Medical Research
- Scientific career
- Fields: Biology, cell biology, apoptosis, Cancer
- Workplaces: Beth Israel Deaconess Medical Center

Alex Toker is currently a professor at the Department of Pathology at Beth Israel Deaconess Medical Center, Harvard Medical School and chief of the Division of Signal Transduction and associate director of the Cancer Research Institute in the Cancer Center. Toker is an expert in the signaling mechanisms that govern cancer progression. His research focus on understanding mechanism of cancer including tumor cell survival, invasion and metastasis. He is currently editor-in-chief of the Journal of Biological Chemistry.

In 2022 Toker was the recipient of the Avanti Award in Lipids.
