= Nahl (surname) =

Nahl is a surname. Notable people with the surname include:

- Charles Christian Nahl (1818–1878), German-born American painter
- Hugo Wilhelm Arthur Nahl (1833–1889), German-born American painter
- Johann August Nahl (1710–1781), German sculptor and stuccoist
- Perham Wilhelm Nahl (1869–1935), American printmaker, painter, illustrator and an arts educator
