= Nevada Union High School =

Location
- 11761 Ridge Road; Grass Valley, USA, California 65945 95945; 39°14′28″N 121°03′08″W

Information
- Type: Public four-year
- Founded: 1954/55
- School board: Nevada Joint Union High School District Board of Trustees
- School district: Nevada Joint Union High School District
- Superintendent: Dan Frisella
- Principal: Kelly Rhoden
- Staff: 3
- Faculty: 62
- Teaching staff: 61.98 (FTE)
- Grades: 9-12
- Average class size: 25
- Student to teacher ratio: 23.51
- Colours: Blue and gold
- Mascot: Miners
- Nickname: NU
- Feeder schools: Lyman Gilmore Middle School, Seven Hills Middle School, Union Hill Middle School
- Website: http://nevadaunion.njuhsd.com/index.html

Nevada Union High School (NU) is located in the Sierra Nevada foothills northeast of California's capital, Sacramento. Situated between Nevada City and Grass Valley, the school serves those two incorporated cities and a large surrounding community. The Nevada Union High School district covers a huge geographic area, with some students bussed in from as far as 56 miles away. NU was named a California Distinguished School in 1997 and 2012, and in 1998 was recognized as a National Blue Ribbon High School.

== History ==
Nevada Union opened in 1961 to serve the needs of Nevada City, Grass Valley, and the surrounding communities. Prior to 1961, the high school was located in Grass Valley.

In the 2005–2006 school year, 242 of 602 seniors (40%) took the SAT, with average scores of 554 in Critical Reading (~65th percentile), 559 in Math (~63rd percentile), and 548 in Writing (~68th percentile).

Nevada Union High School campus was opened at its current location in 1961 as a Senior High School (Grades 10–12). This was not the first campus for NUHS. When the District was formed in 1952, the Senior High School opened at the previous Grass Valley High School and the Junior High School (Grades 7–9)* was initially opened at the former Nevada City High School. With the opening of the new campus in 1961, the Junior High School was moved to the campus of the previous Senior High School.

- After a few years, students at the main feeder grammar schools (Nevada City Elementary and Hennesey Elementary in Grass Valley) had the choice of remaining at their respective schools for Grades 7-8 or transferring to the Junior High School.

== Student body ==
NUHS serves ninth through twelfth grade students. NU is economically diverse, with 45% of families qualifying for the Free and Reduced National School Lunch Program. 4% of the NU population is identified as "McKinney-Vento." Students who attend Nevada Union are not only from Grass Valley and Nevada City; they also commute from North San Juan, Penn Valley, Rough and Ready, Cedar Ridge, Chicago Park, Lake Wildwood, Oregon House, Brownsville, and Alta Sierra.

== Athletics ==
The NU mascot is the Miner, with female teams referred to as the "Lady Miners". The school colors are officially blue and gold, and the shades of those two colors have changed over time.

Due to NU's relative success in several athletic programs, it has developed some significant rivalries that have changed over the years due to league realignments and changes in sports programs. A big rival in the 70s was Placer High School in nearby Auburn. In the 80s and 90s, Grant High School in Sacramento was considered the chief rival. Grant High School has recently become a season game once again due to league changes, and were throttled by the Nevada Union miners in 2012.

In both 2004 and 2005 the Lady Miners volleyball team appeared twice at the Division I California State Championships to compete for the state title.

In 2005 the Nevada Union football team won the first section title in more than a decade, placing first in the state of California and 19th in the United States. The final game was Nevada Union 46, West 7.

In 2008, the Lady Miners volleyball team won its seventh straight section title. This set a new record in all of California for most consecutive section titles in any sport.

In 2009, Nevada Union's Miner Football team won its second section title in ten years.

On August 23, 2024, Kaylin Williams kicked an extra point, making her the first female player to score a point for Nevada Union's varsity football team.

NU offers cross country, track, swimming, soccer, tennis, golf, Nordic skiing, snowboarding, alpine skiing, dance, wrestling, and a mountain bike team.

Football is the main target of Nevada Union's booster support.

== Performing Arts ==
Throughout the past decade, Nevada Union has thoroughly established itself as a producer of performing artists, and Nevada Union's drama department has produced several notable young actors of the new age. The drama department, the Nevada Union Theatrical Society or NUTS, has produced several outstanding plays in the last several years.

The Nevada Union Instrumental Music program is a multi-faceted, award-winning program. The band consists of roughly 150 members, many of whom belong to multiple bands. The concert/symphonic band has taken many awards and received several unanimous "superior" ratings in the past three years. This band is much more extensive, with several members already playing for professional orchestras.

Nevada Union also has two small jazz bands and a marching band. The marching band has received nearly fifty awards altogether, and has also had an award-winning color guard and percussion division during the winter. The marching band follows the Drum Corps International style of marching band, and has one drum major.

The Nevada Union High School Choir Program has seven outstanding choirs. This program consists of roughly 250 members. The Concert and Chamber Choirs place in the top five every year at Golden State Festival in Northern California. Every other year, these choirs travel to Europe to perform, always receiving high amounts of praise. The Chamber Choir is favored in the community, and performs at many events throughout the year. This choir program has been award-winning for over fifty years, first under director Don Baggett and now with his son, director Rod Baggett.

== Visual Arts ==
NU offers a comprehensive Visual Arts program that serves students across all grade levels. The curriculum includes courses in Ceramics, Photography, Drawing and Painting, and Studio Art, with opportunities for Advanced Placement. Nevada Union partners with the Nevada County Arts Council and the Nevada Union Art Guild to provide students with community-based arts opportunities and exhibition platforms. The school recently launched its Visiting Artists program through Proposition 28 funding, bringing working artists into classrooms to enrich instruction and expose students to a variety of contemporary practices. Student work is regularly featured on campus in the Art Lab Student Gallery and local exhibition spaces like the Center for the Arts, highlighting the school's commitment to fostering artistic literacy and cultural participation.

== Notable alumni ==
- Greg F. Anderson, former personal trainer for Barry Bonds
- Rich Brooks, football coach
- Hunter Burgan, musician
- Alela Diane, musician
- Noah Georgeson, musician and record producer
- Spencer Havner, football player
- Zach Helm, writer and director
- Joanna Newsom, musician
- Rick Rossovich, actor
- Gabe Ruediger, retired mixed martial arts fighter
- Chris Senn, professional skateboarder
- Tanner Vallejo, NFL linebacker for the Arizona Cardinals
