= Frederick August Wenderoth =

German-American painter

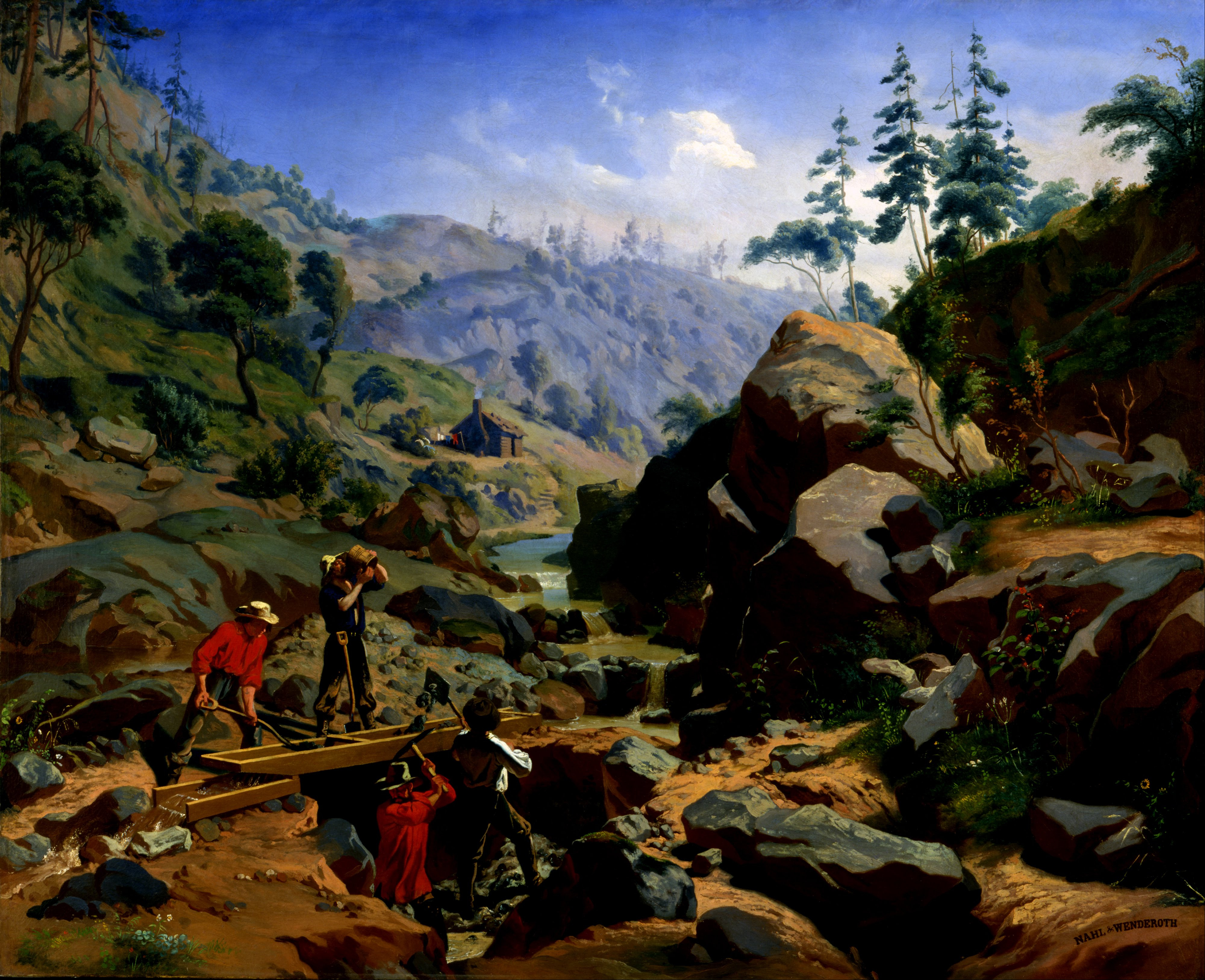
- Miners in the Sierra
- Born: 1819; Cassel, Germany
- Died: 1884 (aged 64–65); Philadelphia, US
- Education: Frederick Mueller; Léon Cogniet

Frederick August Wenderoth or F. A. Wenderoth (1819 – 1884) was a German-born American painter and photographer. Born and educated in Cassel, where he first learned to paint from his father, he established a lifelong friendship with Charles Christian Nahl at school. During the 1840s period of political upheaval in Hesse, he moved to Paris, where he was joined by Nahl and his half-brother Arthur Nahl.

They moved to the US in 1848, living first in New York. They traveled by sea to California to join the Gold Rush. Unsuccessful as miners, Wenderoth and Nahl opened art studios, first in Sacramento and later in San Francisco, collaborating as painters, engravers and photographers.

After a trip to the South Seas and Australia, Wenderoth married and moved to Philadelphia, Pennsylvania, on the East Coast, where he established a photography studio. In the late 1850s he worked for a period in South Carolina, going into partnership with Jesse Bolles. There, and later when he returned to Philadelphia, he created a number of innovative photographic techniques, such as the ivory-type and photozincography. Wenderoth died in 1884 of tuberculosis.

== Early years ==
Frederick August Wenderoth was born in 1819, in Cassel, Germany, to Carl Wenderoth, a painter; his mother was a lady-in-waiting at the Hesse-Kassel court. When he was a child, his father gave him painting lessons. He later studied at the Kunstakademie Cassel with Frederick Mueller. At the academy he met Carl Christian Nahl, who became his lifelong friend. At 18, Wenderoth gave art lessons to the young women at court.

In 1845, during a period of political upheaval, he left Hesse for Paris, and from there traveled to Algeria. Upon his return to Paris, he was joined by Nahl and his widowed mother and siblings. The two friends explored the Louvre and other art museums, and Wenderoth studied with Léon Cogniet.

In 1849, with the Nahl family, Wenderoth left Paris for the United States, settling in Brooklyn. Between 1849 and 1850, he sold nine paintings at the American Art-Union exhibitions.

== California gold rush ==
In 1851, Wenderoth and the Nahl family joined the California Gold Rush. The sea-route to the west coast goldfields was considered far easier than the arduous 2,000-mile-long overland route, with its dangers of illness, thirst, and Indian attacks. Those who chose to travel from the eastern United States west by sea were dubbed Argonauts. Wenderoth and the Nahls left New York in March, traveled by ship to Havana, Cuba, then to Chagres, Panama. They crossed the Isthmus of Panama by foot, and from there took another ship to San Francisco, arriving there in May.

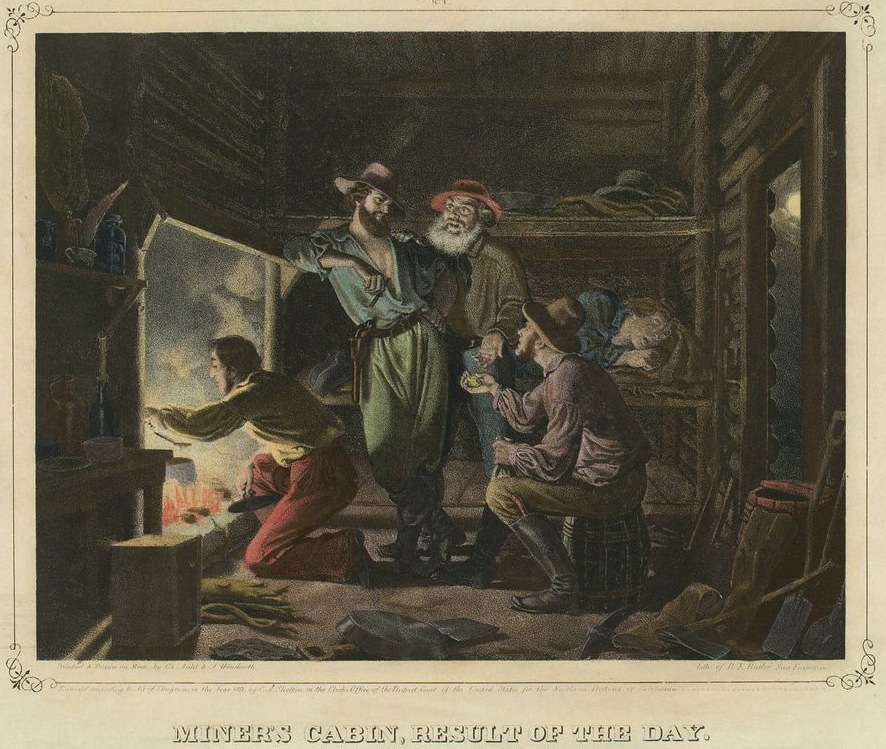
Miner's cabin, Result of the day, showing the interior of a miner's cabin during the California Gold Rush, is an 1852 handpainted lithograph by Wenderoth and Nahls.

Most argonauts stayed in San Francisco to make plans, gather supplies, and recuperate from the long journey. Wenderoth and Nahls, however, left the city the next day, inland to the gold fields on the Yuba River in the Sierras. Arriving in Rough and Ready, the two friends, with Nahl's half-brother Arthur, staked a claim along the banks of Deer Creek. They found it had been salted.

Instead of mining, they sketched the miners in the foothills, and Wenderoth may have taken daguerreotype photographs of miners at this time. Their experience in the mining camps is captured on two stone lithographs, signed by both artists. One shows the interior of a miner's cabin at night, the second shows a miner prospecting. They are significant because they inspired two later paintings: Nahl's 1856 Saturday Night in the Mines, (painted with his brother), and A. D. O. Browere's 1853 The Lone Prospector.

By the end of 1851 the friends had moved to Sacramento, where they set up a studio on Fourth Street. They sold paintings depicting the gold rush. The Placer Times wrote of them in January 1852: "An opportunity is now offered the citizens of Sacramento to gratify their taste for this exalted branch of the fine arts ... of early times in California". The piece mentions that the two took photographs; however, that has not been definitely established. They most likely did paint miniature portraits, perhaps based on daguerreotypes.

They likely painted their joint Miners in the Sierra at this time. The large-scale work (54 1/4 x 66 7/8 in. [137.7 x 169.8 cm]) shows four miners working together against a background landscape. Considered a genre painting, it shows the miners in a high mountain canyon, using a sluice box to extract gold from the river bed. Anthony Kirk, of the California Historical Society, writes that the painting is "powerful and authentic, wonderfully suggestive of the colossal labor necessary to wrest riches from the earth." Additionally, Wenderoth and Nahl made engravings for the Placer Times and The Sacramento Union.

The Sacramento Daily Union on 11 September 1857 mention a drawing of Mr Henry Channing Beals family done in India Ink.

== Photographer and miniaturist ==
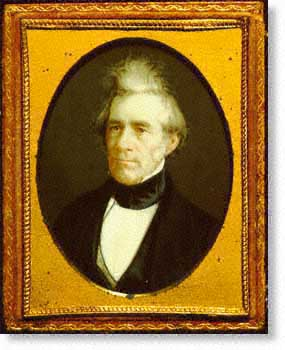
Portrait of a Man (1854), a portrait miniature, is painted on ivory with watercolors.

When the Great Fire of Sacramento destroyed the city, their work was burned. They moved to San Francisco, where they established a studio and quickly gained a reputation. In 1853, Alonzo Delano commissioned illustrations for his Pen Knife Sketches from Wenderoth and Nahl, and a year later they were advertising as daguerreotypists. Additionally Wenderoth worked on miniature portraits at this time, most likely from daguerreotype images. These were painted on "wafer-thin ivory" in watercolors, such as his 1854 Portrait of a Man.

Between 1852 and 1853, Wenderoth traveled to the South Seas and Australia. On his return he married in 1856 he married Nahl's half-sister, Laura. The newly married couple moved to Philadelphia, Pennsylvania, where they meant to settle. However, shortly afterward Laura died in childbirth, along with her infant.

In 1857 Wenderoth was living in Charleston, South Carolina, where he went into business with Jesse H. Bolles for about a year. During this period he seems to have perfected color stereoscopic ambrotypes and ivory types. Ivory types consist of placing a photograph and a painting "of the same subject over each other into a kind of sandwich that is then sealed together with beeswax."

In 1858 he returned to Philadelphia. There Wenderoth worked for Harper's Weekly, producing illustrations and photographs. He established a studio on Chestnut Street, with partner William Curtis Taylor. They were joined by John Henry Brown, a well-known miniaturist. The firm specialized in coloring photographs, which, though growing in popularity, were considered inferior to paintings because of the lack of color. Wenderoth and his colleagues created photographic colorization techniques called "Ivorytypes", "Opalotypes" and the "New Crayon" in which color washes made a photographic portrait appear more like a painting, and thus more marketable.

In 1884 Wenderoth died in Philadelphia of tuberculosis.

== Gallery ==
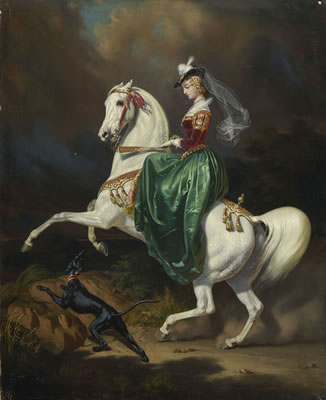
Rider on white horse, 1849, oil on canvas, 29.13" by 23.62". The painting had been destroyed and was restored by 2008 when it was sold at a Fine Arts auction.

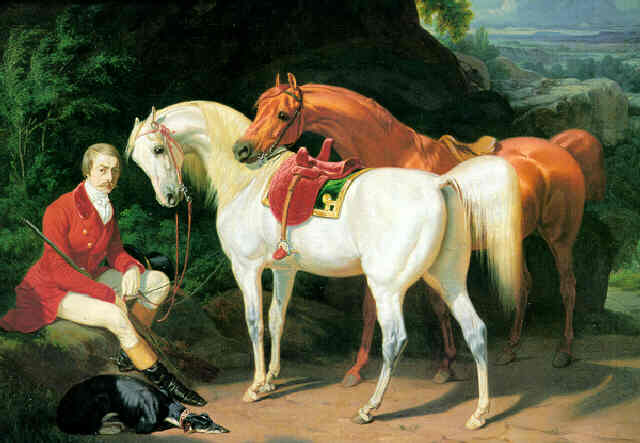
A Winner, 1849

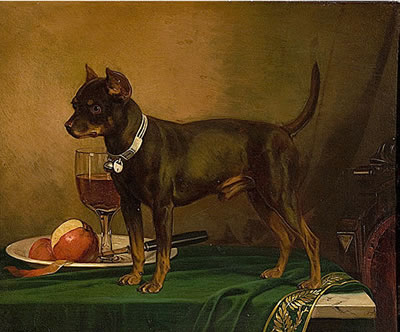
Little Terrier, 1875
