= 49er Fire =

1988 wildfire in Northern California

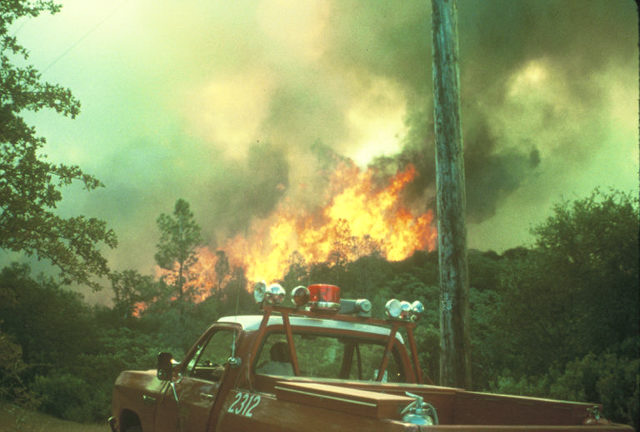
- Flames appear behind a firefighting vehicle during the 49er Fire
- Date: September 11 –; September 16, 1988; (6 days)
- Location: Nevada County & Yuba County, California, United States
- Coordinates: 39.328°N 121.111°W

Statistics
- Burned area: 33,700 acres (13,638 ha; 53 sq mi; 136 km^{2})

Impacts
- Deaths: 0
- Injuries: ≥500
- Evacuated: ≥8,000
- Structures lost: 312
- Cost: $29.1 million; (equivalent to about $66.4 million in 2024)

Ignition
- Cause: Burning debris

Map
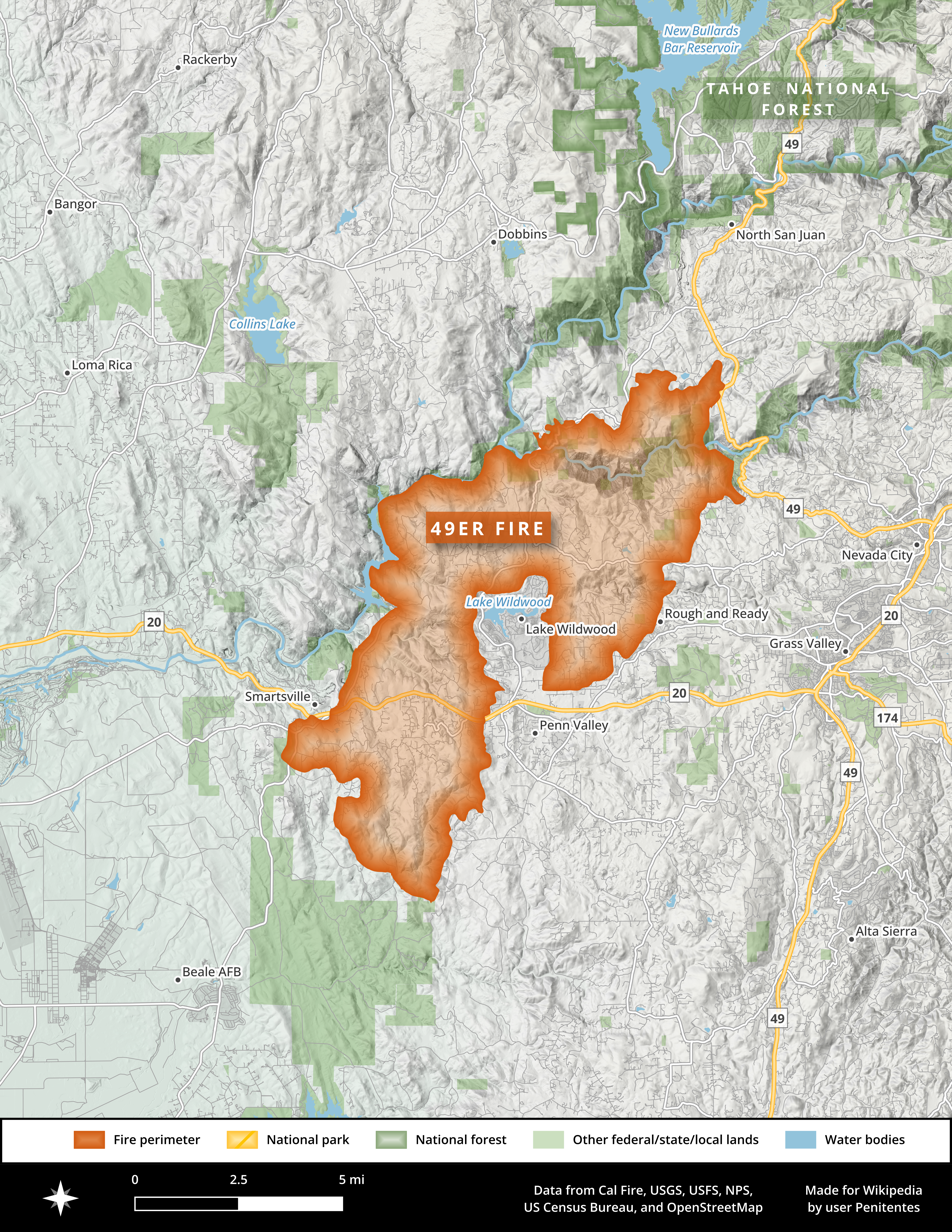
- The fire burned southwest from Highway 49 in a two-pronged arc over several days, crossing both the Yuba River and Highway 20.

- The 49er Fire burned in California's Nevada and Yuba counties, in the foothills of the Sierra Nevada.

The 49er Fire was a destructive wildfire in 1988 in Northern California's Nevada County and Yuba County. The fire ignited on September 11 when a man accidentally set brush on fire by burning toilet paper near Highway 49. Driven by severe drought conditions and strong, dry winds, firefighting crews were hard-pressed to stop the fire's advance until winds calmed and humidity levels recovered. The fire burned through 33,700 acres (13,600 hectares) of the Sierra Nevada foothills, impinging on the communities of Lake Wildwood, Rough and Ready, and Smartsville before officials declared it fully contained on September 16.

The 49er Fire destroyed 312 structures, including more than 140 homes, making it the most destructive wildfire in Nevada County's history and—at the time—one of the five most destructive wildfires in recorded Californian history. It was also the seventh most expensive California wildfire in terms of losses, which amounted to approximately $23 million (equivalent to about $52 million in 2024). The 49er Fire highlighted the rapid pace and potential consequences of development in the wildland–urban interface (WUI), and was sometimes called the 'wildfire of the 1990s' by state officials in an effort to raise awareness of the growing challenges of firefighting in areas where human structures intermingle with wildland fuels.

== Background ==
=== WUI development ===
The 49er Fire began and spread through the heavily populated foothills of the Sierra Nevada in Nevada County and a small portion of Yuba County. This wildland–urban interface zone, located northeast of Sacramento and at the time one of the fastest-growing such areas in California, contained many properties that were difficult to protect from wildfires. Some fire officials argued that they were less able to fight the fire because of the time and resources spent on defending the buildings in its path. During the first several hundred acres of the fire's growth, firefighters were forced to defend 55 different structures.

Many homes lay at the end of narrow and unmarked roads, on or near steep hillsides, and adjacent to heavy vegetation; according to the Nevada Fire Safe Council, 80 percent of the destroyed residences lacked the required brush clearance. Wood shingle (or "shake") roofs and siding were also plentiful on structures and receptive to fire spread during the 49er Fire. Nevada County had banned such roofs in new construction, but the ban did not apply to existing structures and a California Department of Forestry and Fire Protection (Cal Fire) official estimated that 30 percent of older homes still had them. The chief ranger for the Nevada-Yuba-Placer fire ranger district also blamed lax land planning that allowed 'Class K' construction without plumbing or electricity in Nevada County.

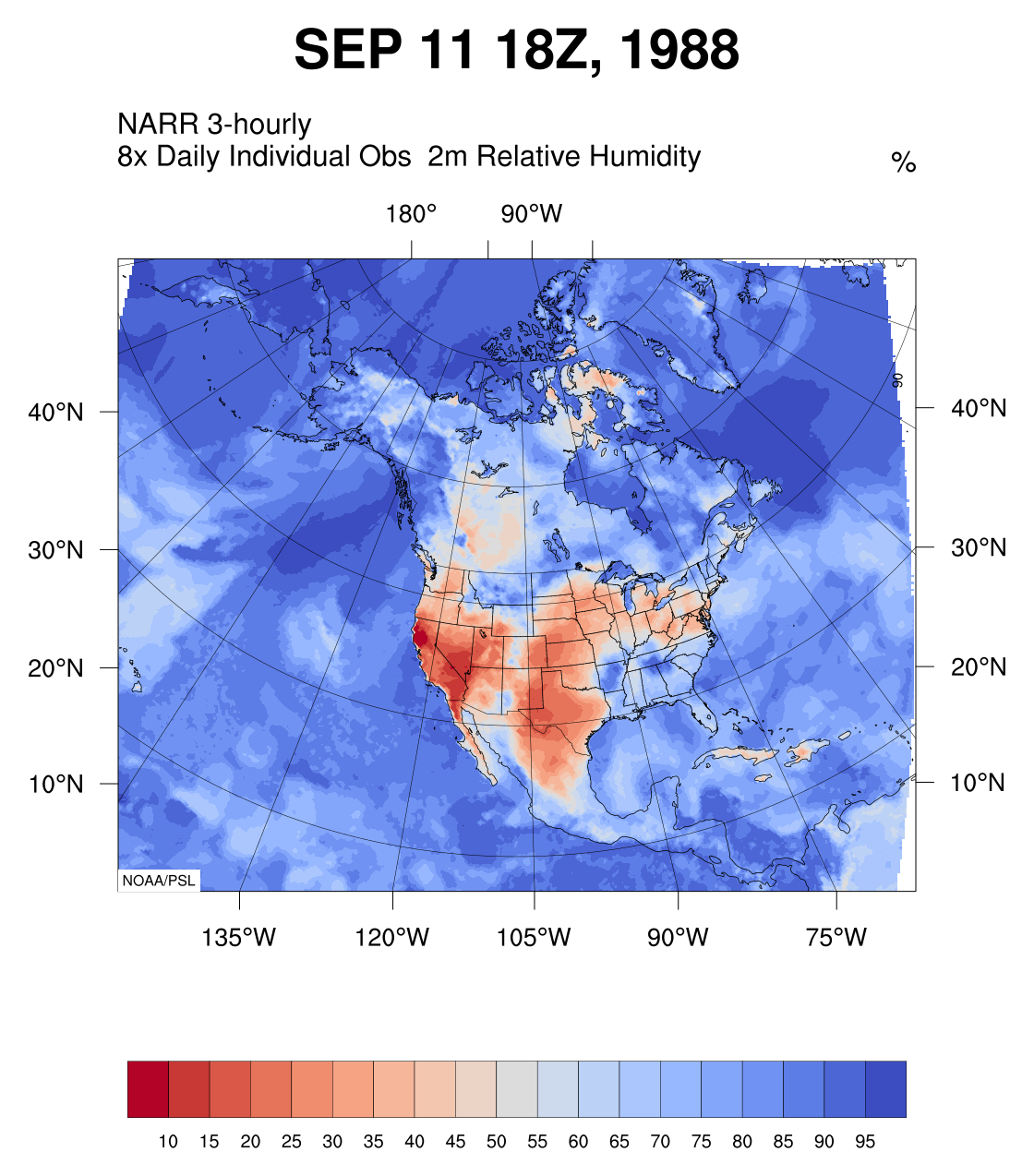
This map of relative humidity at 18Z on September 11, 1988, shows the low RH levels across Northern California.

=== Climate and weather ===
For nearly two years prior to the fire, California had been dogged by a drought that eventually spread throughout much of North America. The drought had begun in the state in the 1987 water year and continued all the way through to the 1992 water year. During this period, California recorded multiple severe wildfire seasons, with 1987, 1988, and 1990 all among the worst yet then observed in the state by acreage burned. This was partly because the drought greatly increased tree mortality in forests, destroying at least 18 billion board feet of timber between its onset and cessation. In 1988, at least 12 Californian counties declared local drought emergencies, primarily in Central and Northern California.

Lastly, the weather conditions before and during the 49er Fire's development were characteristic of a Northern Californian critical fire weather pattern. A strong upper-level trough moved east from eastern Washington and Idaho as an upper-level ridge built offshore in the Pacific. Meanwhile, a jet developed on the western side of the trough, bringing a sinking airmass across the mountains and into Northern California. These ingredients created strong northeast downslope winds (known as Foehn winds) on the western slopes of the Sierra Nevada, accompanied by low relative humidity levels. These dry winds blew at up to 40 miles per hour (64 km/h) on September 11 and 12.

== Progression ==
=== September 11 ===
On the morning of September 11, 1988, at approximately 9:00 a.m. PDT, the 49er Fire was accidentally lit by Gary Wayne Parris, a homeless man suffering from undiagnosed schizophrenia. Parris was using an abandoned shack—lacking electricity or running water—for shelter on Birchville Road, just off of Highway 49. Seeking to dispose of torn strips of paper grocery bags that he had used as toilet paper, Parris set fire to the strips outside with a cigarette lighter. Almost immediately, gusts of wind blew the burning paper into nearby brush, which quickly ignited. Parris sought to put out the fire by obtaining water from a nearby pond with buckets. He was unsuccessful, and stopped nearby motorists on Highway 49, admitting to having burned the toilet paper and asking them to call the fire department. One of the motorists tried to scrape a crude firebreak with a shovel, but failed. At the same time, a fire crew from Columbia Hill Forest Fire Station spotted the smoke on their way back from another incident, attempted to extinguish the fire, but failed.

Within ten minutes of the first report, Cal Fire air tankers were on the scene attacking the blaze. Fire engines were there within 50 minutes. Multiple newspapers report that a second fire was then spotted from the Oregon Peak fire lookout—this one too on the north side of Birchville Road, but a mile southwest of Parris's fire and close to the Pine Grove Reservoir. The second fire grew rapidly and the two soon merged. It is unknown whether this second fire was a spot fire of the original, caused by downed or arcing power lines, or the result of a separate ignition.

By 10:00 a.m., the fire had burned 20–40 acres (8.1–16.2 ha), and by 11:00 a.m., 100 acres (40 ha). The fire crossed the South Yuba River by around 1:00 p.m. Forty-five minutes later, structures were burning on the nearby Owl Creek Road and McKitrick Ranch Road, and evacuations had begun for other neighborhoods between the South Yuba River and Lake Wildwood to the southwest. Winds continued to blow at 40–45 miles per hour (64–72 km/h), driving rapid fire growth: at the peak of the 49er Fire's spread, it was burning more than 1,000 acres (400 ha) per hour, with wind-blown ember spotting of more than half a mile. Flames exceeded 200 feet (61 metres) in height.

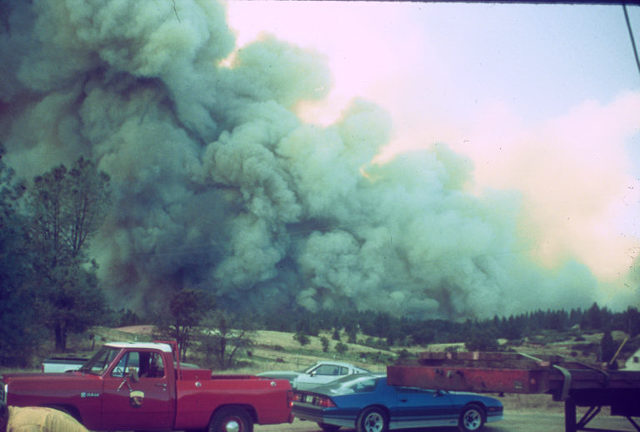
The massive smoke plume of the 49er Fire rises beyond vehicles.

Lake Wildwood was evacuated in the afternoon. That night, many residents stayed and attempted to save their houses themselves, often fighting along firefighters, and with varying levels of success. Many houses burned despite the best efforts of residents armed with garden hoses, attempting to beat back encroaching 200-foot crown fires. After the wind shifted, a group of 40 firefighters were burned over and had to deploy their fire shelters, though all avoided injury. Elsewhere, flames engulfed a dozer, forcing its operator to seek refuge beneath it while wrapping himself in an asbestos fire blanket. By 6:00 p.m., 4,000 acres (1,600 ha) had burned.

=== September 12 onwards ===
Still driven by high winds and spreading rapidly, the 49er Fire crossed Highway 20 at 9:30 a.m. on September 12, dashing the hopes of fire officials who had hoped to hold the fire there. (Note: The Press-Tribune reports that the fire jumped Highway 20 at 9:30 am, while The San Francisco Examiner says the fire jumped the highway on "Monday afternoon." The Press-Tribune is preferred because it (A) was printed and issued the same day that the fire crossed, and (B) provides a specific time.) By noon, it had burned at least 12,000 acres (4,900 ha). The fire moved down Deer Creek Canyon towards Rough and Ready, and at 3:15 p.m., Nevada County Sheriff deputies ordered the complete evacuation of the town. Lake Wildwood residents had briefly been allowed to return; they re-evacuated, joining the communities of Penn Valley and Yuba County's Smartsville. The fire was 40 percent contained by nighttime.

On September 13, the weather changed in favor of firefighting efforts. Winds calmed down to 5–7 miles per hour (8.0–11.3 km/h), temperatures dropped by ten degrees Fahrenheit, and relative humidity levels doubled. An inversion layer kept smoke trapped near the surface, grounding air tankers and limiting visibility in Rough and Ready to under three miles per hour (4.8 km/h), but also quelling fire activity. Evacuation orders for multiple communities, including Rough and Ready and Penn Valley, were lifted, and Highways 20 and 49 reopened. The fire still remained active: it threatened the Grass Valley Group industrial complex, moved into the Jones Bar area near the Yuba River, and burned into grasslands around Beale Air Force Base before it was extinguished four miles (6.4 km) from the main part of the base, but no structures were lost after the night of September 12. Firefighters worried about the remaining uncontained portion of the fire in the Rush Creek drainage, south of the Yuba River and northwest of Grass Valley and Nevada City, but despite occasional spot fires a combination of hand crews and helicopters kept the fire from escaping. The night of September 13 brought higher humidity levels and relief from the winds.

On September 14, part of the fire's eastern flank moved towards Nevada City near Jones Bar Road but was halted by fire crews. That day, the fire was declared 90 percent contained. The fire was declared 100 percent contained on September 15, at 6:00 a.m., and Cal Fire announced that the fire was completely controlled on September 16, at 8:30 p.m., five days after it had ignited. In total, more than 8,000 people had been forced to evacuate in the communities of Rough and Ready, Cement Hill, Lake Wildwood, and Penn Valley. At peak staffing, at least 2,700 firefighters had fought the 49er Fire.

== Effects ==
The fire caused no fatalities. The most serious injuries were borne by two firefighters—Rene Ruiz and Larry Lindbloom—as they attempted to defend a home in the Wildwood Heights subdivision. Their fire engine was burned over and destroyed alongside the home, and the pair were sent to the hospital via helicopter with second and third degree leg burns. Both were released within 24 hours. According to a Cal Fire official, 500 firefighters sustained minor injuries.

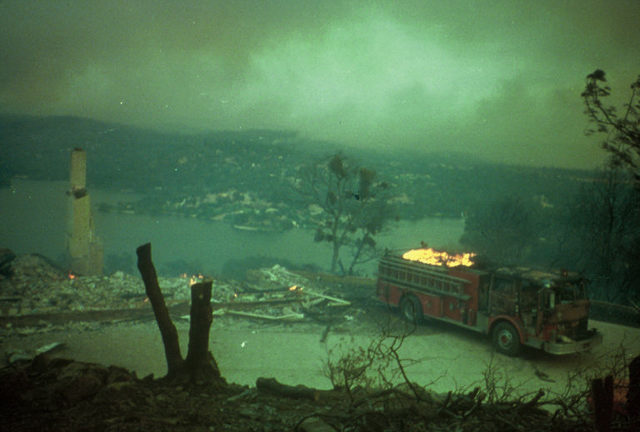
An abandoned, burning fire engine sits next to a destroyed home; behind, Lake Wildwood is visible below smoke.

The fire burned 33,700 acres and destroyed 312 structures. When it occurred, it was the seventh most expensive (in terms of losses) and fifth most destructive wildfire in recorded Californian history. Though it has since fallen well out of the top 20 destructive fires, it remains the most destructive wildfire in Nevada County history. The number of destroyed homes is unclear: the Nevada Fire Safe Council reported it as 148, while the Red Cross estimate reached 190, including 23 mobile homes. According to the Red Cross, another 17 dwellings were damaged. Dozens of vehicles and multiple boats were also destroyed. The fire threatened but did not burn the Woods Crossing bridge, built in 1862 and reportedly the longest single-span covered bridge in the United States.

The 49er Fire was dubbed the "wildfire of the 1990s", first by Cal Fire officials highlighting the difficult nature of fighting wildfires in foothill and wildland terrain undergoing urbanization. Then, state legislators wielded it as part of their efforts to pass legislation that would authorize bonds for augmenting Cal Fire assets and implementing wildfire hazard reduction efforts in at-risk developed areas.

As the fire burned, Governor of California George Deukmejian declared a state of emergency in Nevada and Yuba counties. President Ronald Reagan did the same for the two counties on September 29, allowing them to access millions of dollars in federal relief. The Yuba County Board of Supervisors also declared a local emergency. In 1989, the California State Assembly passed AB 3, a disaster relief bill to provide money to supplement federal funds for individual and family claims. After the fire, the Small Business Administration approved almost $1.7 million in home, property, and business loans. The state Department of Social Services provided another $174,000 in grants for recovery. Jerry Partain, then the director of Cal Fire, reported that damages amounted to $23 million with an additional $6.1 million for fire suppression costs. There were also incidental economic impacts: in the weeks after the fire, tourists canceled hotel reservations in Nevada City and Grass Valley, mistakenly assuming that the 49er Fire had damaged the towns.

== Legal proceedings ==
=== Apprehension and charges ===
Parris was seen absconding the shack at the scene of the ignition by Nevada County Sheriff's Department deputies on their way to respond to the fire. A member of the Sheriff's Department said he found Parris 12 miles (19 km) from the ignition point after witnesses advised him to look for a man with a bucket. Upon being found, Parris's first words were allegedly "I'm in trouble, aren't I?". That day, he was only cited for negligent burning, and remained free for two days until he was arrested and jailed on September 13 on charges of public intoxication.

Parris originally faced a misdemeanor charge for the negligent burning, but after meeting with Cal Fire officials, Nevada County district attorney John Darlington changed the charges to a felony even as news reports raised Parris's possible mental health issues and level of responsibility for his actions. Parris was arraigned on September 15. Nevada County Superior Court Judge Ersel Edwards ordered that Parris be held in the county jail on a $50,000 bail, prompted by Darlington, who argued in favor of the atypically large bail by citing Parris's past arrests for public intoxication and a concern for his safety. While Parris could have been held financially responsible for the fire, Darlington noted that it was a futile expectation, given that Parris had no money. On September 19, Parris pleaded not guilty to the charge of felony reckless burning. The case then went before the court. Judge Edwards changed the charge from reckless burning of an inhabited structure to reckless burning of an uninhabited structure, after testimony that Parris's shack had not been fit for human habitation.

The case was moved to the Sutter County Superior Court after Judge Edwards disqualified himself because he knew several fire victims, and there were fears that an impartial jury could not be formed in Nevada County because of the fire's widespread damage to local homes and property. In February 1989, Parris pled not guilty by reason of insanity to the two felony charges for reckless burning, as well as two misdemeanors. Testifying in his own defense, Parris admitted to hearing voices, among other phenomena, and said that the winds that had blown the burning paper into the brush had been the work of supernatural forces. Nevada County district attorney John Darlington argued that Parris had been sufficiently aware of his actions for his decision to burn the paper to qualify as reckless, though Parris's public defender argued otherwise.

=== Conviction and incarceration ===
Parris was assaulted and injured in jail while awaiting his conviction. In February 1989, a Sutter County Superior Court jury found Parris guilty of the two felony counts (reckless burning of a structure and reckless burning of forest land) and the two misdemeanor counts (negligently allowing a fire to burn out of control and burning property without permission of the owner). Shortly thereafter, he was found legally insane. Sutter County Superior Judge Timothy J. Evans declared that Parris would serve out the remainder of his sentence at Atascadero State Hospital, an all-male maximum-security psychiatric facility, also requiring that Parris's mental condition be re-evaluated after completing his sentence. Evans ruled that Parris's incarceration could be extended indefinitely by the court if he were still found to be a danger.

Some time after his conviction, Parris was diagnosed with schizophrenia. Parris was released as an outpatient in 1995, but allegedly violated the terms of his release and was re-arrested in 1997 in Texas. In 1998, Sutter County Judge Robert Damron declared that Parris remained a threat, sentencing him to two more years at Atascadero. He was released in 2002.

== See also ==
- List of California wildfires
- Yellowstone fires of 1988 – A contemporaneous outbreak of wildfires in and around Yellowstone National Park
- North Complex Fire – A massive wildfire in 2020 driven by a similar 'inside slider' weather pattern in the northern Sierra Nevada
- River Fire (2021) – Another wind-driven and destructive wildfire in Nevada County
