= Lake Wildwood =

Lake Wildwood may refer to:

- Lake Wildwood, California
- Lake Wildwood, Georgia
- Lake Wildwood, Illinois
