= Nahl =

Nahl or NAHL may refer to:

- Nahl (surname)
- National Accident Helpline, a British personal injury lawyer service
- North American Hockey League, an American junior hockey league
- North American Hockey League (1973–1977), an American professional hockey league

== See also ==
- An-Nahl, the 16th sura of the Qur'an, from the Arabic word for bee
