= Penn Valley =

Penn Valley may refer to:

- Penn Valley, California, a census-designated place in Nevada County, California
- Penn Valley, Pennsylvania, a suburb in Lower Merion, Pennsylvania
- Penn Valley Park a park overlooking Downtown Kansas City
- Penn Valley (California), a valley in Nevada County
