= Hugo Wilhelm Arthur Nahl =

German-American painter

Arthur Nahl
- Born: Hugo Wilhelm Arthur Nahl; September 1, 1833; Kassel, Germany
- Died: April 1, 1889 (aged 55); San Francisco Bay, California
- Education: Louvre Palace, Versailles, and Luxembourg Palace galleries
- Known for: Painting
- Notable work: The Fire in Sacramento
- Movement: American Old West

Arthur Nahl (1 September 1833 – 1 April 1889) was a German-born artist, daguerreotyper, engraver, portraitist, and landscape painter. Nahl was a painter known for his American Old West paintings of California. He was considered one of California's finest engravers, and was ranked amongst the best gymnasts in California for his time.

== Early life ==
He was the son of Henriette (Weickh) Nahl (1796–1863). Henriette and her first husband, Georg Valentin Friedrich Nahl, had one son, the American West painter Charles Christian Nahl (1818–1878). Henriette and Georg divorced in 1826. In that year, she began a relationship with Georg's cousin, Alexander Theodor Nahl. After growing tired of him, she began a relationship with Alexander's brother, Wilhelm Nahl. While Wilhelm was Hugo's biological parent, he considered Alexander to be his father. Henriette and Wilhelm had one other child, a daughter, Laura.

Nahl was descended from a family of German artists dating to the 17th century. His great-grandfather was Johann August Nahl, the German sculptor and stuccoist.

His early art studies were with Charles and the family friend Frederick August Wenderoth. He later studied at the Kassel Academy. Nahl moved with his mother, two brothers, and two sisters to Paris in 1846. Here, Arthur and Charles studied with Emile Jean Horace Vernet and Hippolyte Delaroche. Charles went on to study at the Louvre Palace, Palace of Versailles, and Luxembourg Palace galleries. He received his first gold medal at age 16.

Three years later, they moved to New York City, settling in Brooklyn. In 1851, they sailed by way of Panama to California in search of gold. The family bought a mine on Deer Creek near Rough and Ready, California, which fared poorly. Within a year, the family moved to Sacramento where Nahl worked as a woodcarver. After the 1852 Sacramento fire, they moved to San Francisco.

== Career ==
Nahl worked in charcoal, crayon, oil, and watercolor. His subjects included animals, landscapes, portraits, and genre works.

In San Francisco, Charles partnered first with his family friend Wenderoth. After Wenderoth married one of the Nahl sisters and moved to Philadelphia, Charles began a partnership with Arthur. The Nahl brothers worked as commercial artists, daguerreotypers, engravers, and portrait painters. They became San Francisco's leading lithographers and specialized in souvenir stationery. They created many wood carvings from photograph images. With his brother and William Dieckmann, Nahl formed the partnership of Nahl Brothers and Dieckmann in 1867, an art and photograph gallery at 121 Montgomery Street in San Francisco.

When Isaiah West Taber bought out the Nahl's photography department, Nahl worked for him, coloring and retouching the photographs. Nahl collaborated with others, including Bret Harte, on the cover design of Overland Monthly.

We are working like a factory; Carl [Charles] paints the heads and I paint the garments.

— Letter from Arthur to his uncle Wilhelm Nahl in Germany.

His exhibitions included:

- American Art Union
- San Francisco Art Association
- California Exposition & State Fair, 1888 (medal)
- California Midwinter International Exposition of 1894

Nahl's art works are held at the Oakland Museum and the California Historical Society.

== Personal life ==
The Nahl brothers were fine athletes. At their home in San Francisco's Bush Street, their backyard gymnasium served as the early version of the Olympic Club and was its headquarters during the period of 1855 to 1860. At Nahl's suggestion, it was named the "San Francisco Olympic Club" and, at the club's inaugural meeting on May 6, 1860, Nahl was elected its leader.

Nahl married Annie Sweeney in 1865 and they moved to Alameda. One of Nahl's sons, Perham Wilhelm Nahl (1869–1935), became an artist and art professor at the University of California, and founder of the California College of Arts and Crafts. Another son, Virgil Theodore Nahl (1876–1930), went to work as a staff artist for the San Francisco Examiner. A third son, Arthur Charles Nahl, was a mining engineer; his daughters Marion and Phyllis a ballet dancer, Margery, was an impressionist painter.

Nahl died in 1889 on a ferry in San Francisco Bay en route to Alameda.

== Partial bibliography ==
- Nahl, A., & Nahl, C. C. (1863). Instructions in gymnastics by Arthur and Charles Nahl: Illustrated with 53 plates, containing several hundred figures. San Fran: A. Rosenfield.

== Selected gallery ==
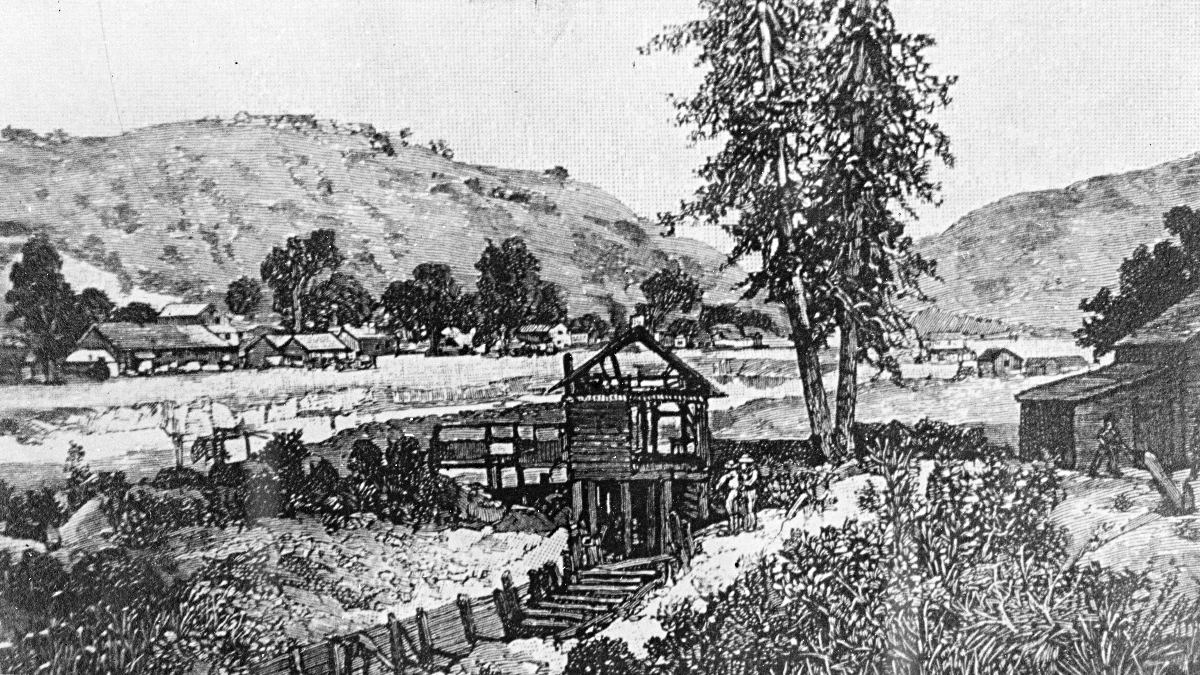
Sutter's Mill, 1851. First Discovery of Gold in California, January 19th, 1848. (1851) Oil on canvas.

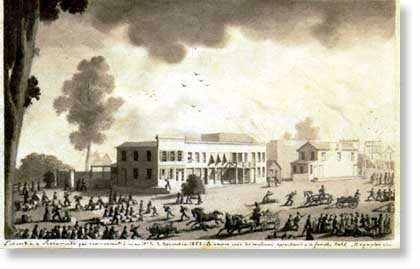
The Fire in Sacramento. (1852) Watercolor on paper; displayed at the Oakland Museum of California

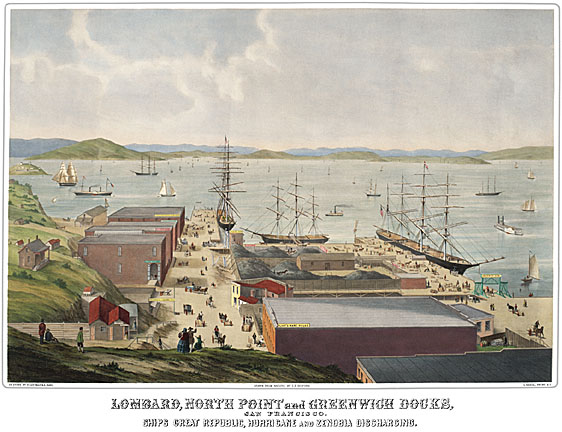
Lombard, North Point and Greenwich Docks, San Francisco Bay. (1857) Hand-colored lithograph on paper.
