= Alonzo Delano =

American writer

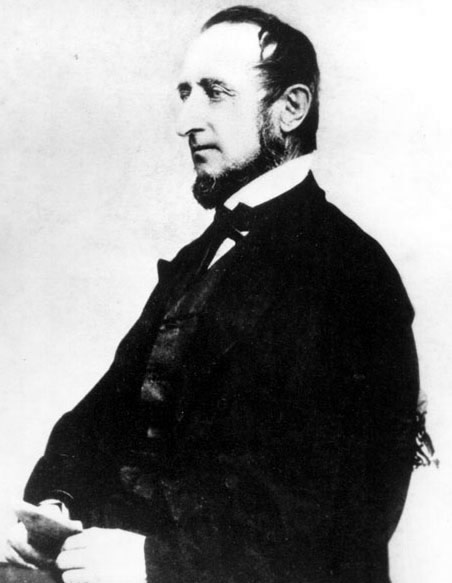
- Born: July 2, 1806; Aurora, New York U.S.
- Died: September 8, 1874 (aged 68); Grass Valley, California, U.S.
- Occupation: Humorist
- Spouse(s): Mary Burt; Maria Harmon
- Children: Fred; Harriet
- Writing career
- Pen name: Old Block
- Genres: Historical fiction, travel literature, satire, social commentary, newspaper column
- Notable works: Life on the Plains and Among the Diggings

Alonzo Delano (July 2, 1806 - September 8, 1874), who went by the pen name "Old Block", was an American humorist, pioneer town city father, and a California Gold Rush Forty-niner. Delano's sketches of gold rush camp life rivaled Bret Harte and Mark Twain in popularity.

== Early life ==
Delano was born in Aurora, New York. His father, Dr. Frederick Delano, a physician, was an early settler of the town. Delano had ten siblings. The family descended from French Huguenots. His great-great-grandfather, Phillipe de la Noye, was also the great-great-great-great-grandfather of U.S. President Franklin Delano Roosevelt.

== Career ==
He left school when he was young, and started working at age fifteen. His work as an itinerant merchant took him to frontier communities in Ohio and Indiana. By 1848, Delano had relocated his family to Ottawa, Illinois where he worked as a merchant selling bank stocks, flour, lard, silk, and whiskey, while becoming a well-respected community leader.

He became ill that year with consumption, and following his physician's orders for a change of residence and more exertion, Delano decided to head west to California. Before departing, he made arrangements to send correspondence to the publishers of two newspapers, the Ottawa Free Trader and True Delta in New Orleans. At the age of 42, and being sick, he shipped his belongings, including cattle, to join the Dayton Company of travelers in St. Joseph, Missouri, the rendezvous point. His first week traveling was spent delirious with fever. He did not see his family again for six years.

When Delano reached Marysville, California, he earned $400 in three weeks drawing portraits of whiskered gold miners at an ounce of gold dust per head. After reaching San Francisco, Delano became a correspondent for the San Francisco Daily Courier and the Pacific News. Along with Prentice Mulford, Delano was one of the first to use “California Humor”, a style of writing that uses satirical social commentary that exaggerates situations. Some of his articles were written by his long-nosed proto-Will Rogers figure "Old Block", taken from his whimsical sketches of miners and gamblers. These articles were later collected and published in book form in Pen-Knife Sketches and Old Block's Sketch Book. Charles Nahl was his illustrator. Delano's book, On the Trail to the California Gold Rush, was a chronicle of his 1849 travels to California, and included an Introduction by American historian J. S. Holliday. His letters, a journal, and some writings were published in Life on the Plains and among the Diggings. His comical play, A Live Woman in the Mines, features the hero Pike County Jess and heroine High Betty Martin.

In 1850, Timothy Ellsworth and Delano purchased a claim on Massachusetts Hill located near Gold Hill in Nevada County, California, and organized the Sierra Quartz Mining Company. At one point, Delano owned one-sixth of the Massachusetts Hill Quartz Mine; Delano & Co. was very involved in its development. In 1851, Delano sold out his interest to Dr. J. C. Delavan, an agent of Rocky Bar, a New York company. Delano was a storekeeper in several communities, including Grass Valley. He was elected the first treasurer of the city of Grass Valley, California. He started working for Wells, Fargo & Company in Sacramento in 1854 and was Grass Valley's first Wells Fargo agent.

== Personal life ==
During a visit to his hometown of Aurora in 1830, Delano met and married Mary Burt. They had two children: Fred (1833–1857) and Harriet (born 1843). After Mary died in 1871, Delano married Maria Harmon in 1872. Delano died in Grass Valley in 1874 and is buried at Greenwood Cemetery.

== Selected works ==
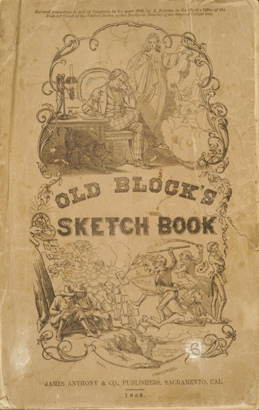
Old Block's sketch-book; or, Tales of California life

- (1853) Pen-Knife Sketches. Or Chips of the Old Block. A Series of Original Letters, Written by One of California's Pioneer Miners, and Dedicated to That Class of Her Citizens by the Author.
- (1854) Life on the Plains and Among the Diggings
- (1857) A Live Woman in the Mines; or, Pike County Ahead. A Local Play in Two Acts
- (1856) Old Block's sketch-book; or, Tales of California life
- (2005) On the trail to the California gold rush
