= Perham Wilhelm Nahl =

American Painter

Perham Nahl
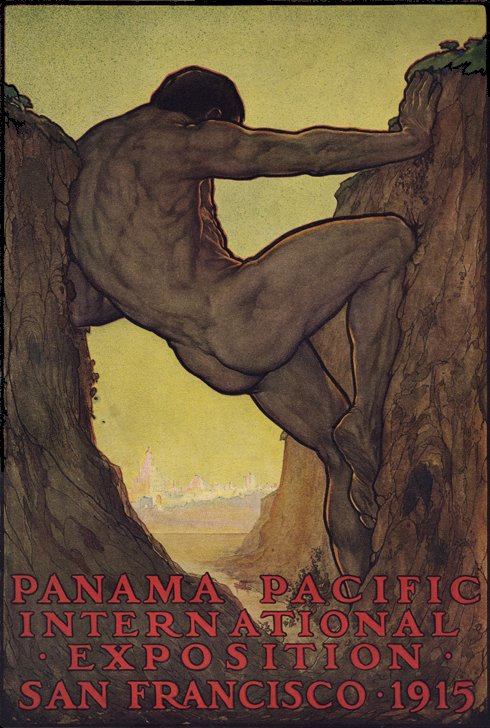
- 13th Labor of Hercules, 1915 at the Panama-Pacific International Exposition (PPIE)
- Born: Perham Wilhelm Nahl; January 11, 1869; San Francisco, California
- Died: April 9, 1935 (aged 66); San Francisco, California
- Education: Mark Hopkins Institute

Perham Wilhelm Nahl (January 11, 1869 – April 9, 1935) was an American printmaker, painter, illustrator and an arts educator active in Northern California.

== Early life ==
Perham Wilhelm Nahl was born to Annie (née Sweeny) and Hugo Wilhelm Arthur Nahl in San Francisco, California. By the mid-1870s the extended Nahl family had moved to the nearby island town of Alameda, where Perham first studied drawing and painting with both his father and his uncle, the fine art painter Charles Christian Nahl. The young Nahl became a director and president of the Alameda Olympic Club, was a competitive diver at the Pacific Swimming Club, and served on the board of the Gentlemen’s Exercise Club of Alameda.

== Work ==
Perham Nahl was employed as a lithographer at H. S. Crocker & Co. when in 1894 he married Nanette (“Nan”) Woods in Berkeley; the couple continued to live in Alameda. In the mid-1890s he staged before large audiences several risqué tableau vivants where naked models of both sexes were covered only with a thin layer of bronze pigment. His arrest and trial in New York City, where William Merritt Chase appeared in his defense, and subsequent scandals at home ended his theatre career. From 1899 to 1901 he was a staff illustrator at the San Francisco Examiner. Nahl became a composer of popular music and served on the committee of the Alameda Coral Society. After divorcing his wife in 1902 he opened a studio in San Francisco and established his residence there, near the home of the Nahls’ family friend, Frederick Meyer.

Perham attended the Mark Hopkins Institute from 1899 to 1905 and studied under Charles C. Judson, Arthur Frank Mathews, John Stanton, Alice Chittenden, and Frederick Meyer. He won school prizes in life class, portrait drawing, composition, design, poster art, and painting, as well as a scholarship and a teaching certificate at graduation. From February until May 1906 he taught at U.C. Berkeley as the Instructor of Pen and Ink Drawing in the architecture department but felt he needed to learn more, so he set off to Europe to study anatomy at the Akademie Heyman in Munich, Germany.

On his return in 1907, Nahl became one of the founding members of the School of the California Guild of Arts and Crafts in Berkeley, which became today’s California College of the Arts Initially, Perham taught drawing, antique classes, and watercolor, and later added life classes for men and women, oil painting, and composition. He maintained an active teaching schedule until his death.

In May 1908 Nahl married his second wife, Berkeley socialite and musician June Connor. He played a prominent role in the formation of the Berkeley Art Association in 1907 and the Berkeley League of Fine Arts in 1923. In 1912 Perham began a parallel career teaching in the art department of U.C. Berkeley, where he became a professor in 1929. He travelled frequently to Mexico, and his study of its modern muralists influenced his art. He was partly responsible for bringing an exhibition of drawings by Diego Rivera to U.C. Berkeley in 1926. Perham also became a leading authority on Japanese painting and was appointed curator of the massive Armes collection of oriental art at U.C. Berkeley.

He died on April 9, 1935, in San Francisco, from injuries sustained when he was hit by a car.

== Awards ==
Between 1880 and 1935 Nahl was a prolific exhibitor throughout California and his oil paintings, drawings, charcoals, prints (especially monotypes, etchings, and lithographs), sculptures, and watercolors were consistently well received. Among his many awards was the bronze medal at Seattle’s Alaska-Yukon-Pacific Exposition in 1909 for his painting The Silence. In 1915 at the Panama-Pacific International Exposition (PPIE), Nahl’s 13th Labor of Hercules lithographic poster was given a first prize and selected as the official image, which was featured on maps, book covers and catalogues of the Exposition, advertised worldwide. The image features a muscular male nude straddled between two bodies of land symbolizing the Culebra Cut in the Panama Canal. Also at the Exposition he received a bronze medal for his “psychological study” in oil titled Despair and a silver medal for his thirteen etchings. In 1926 he received a prize from the California Society of Etchers.
