= Tanner Vallejo =

American football player (born 1994)

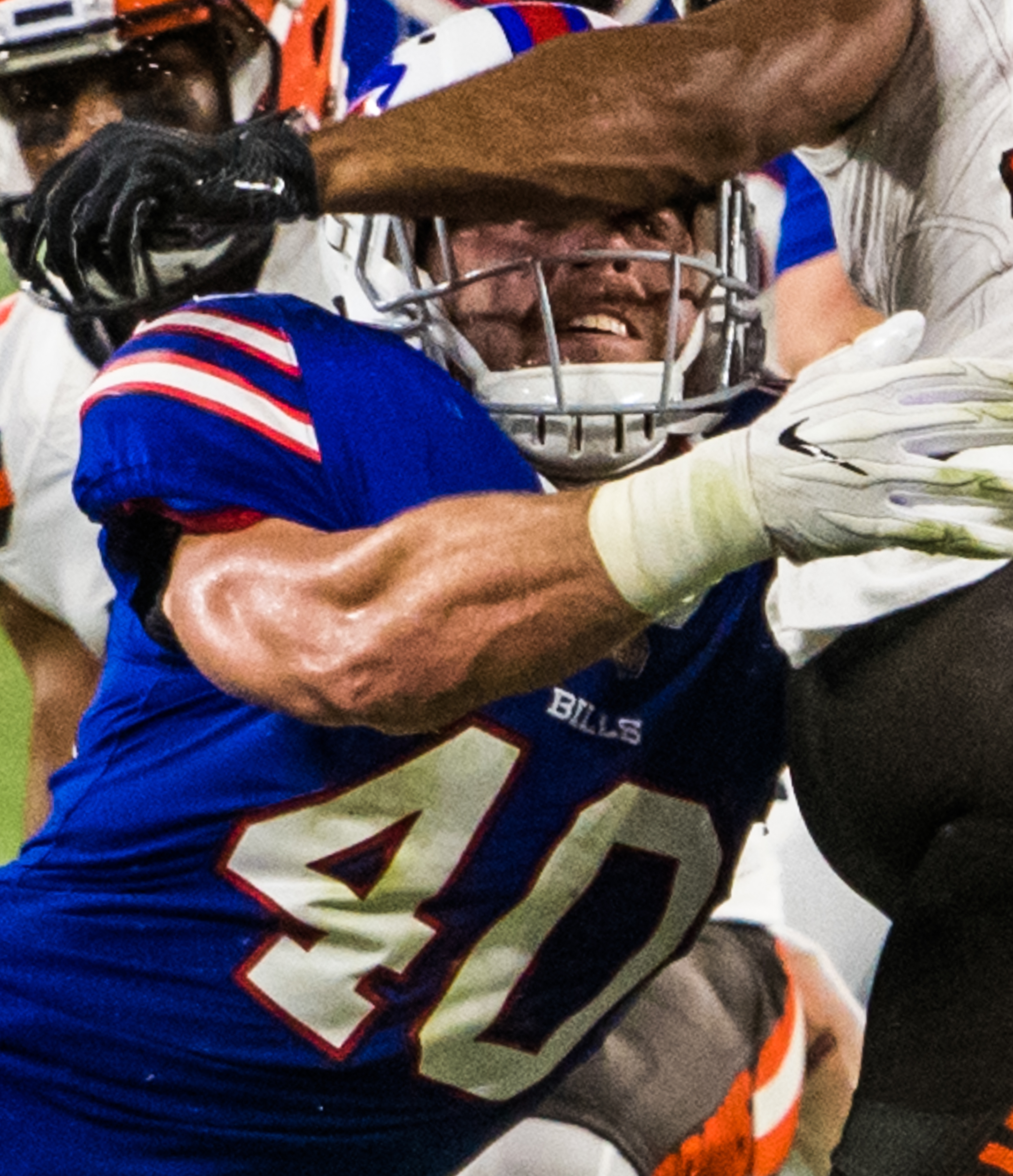
- Vallejo with the Buffalo Bills in 2018

No. 40, 54, 50, 51
- Position: Linebacker

Personal information
- Born: December 16, 1994 (age 31); Penn Valley, California, U.S.
- Listed height: 6 ft 1 in (1.85 m)
- Listed weight: 230 lb (104 kg)

Career information
- High school: Nevada Union (Grass Valley, California)
- College: Boise State
- NFL draft: 2017: 6th round, 195th overall pick

Career history
- Buffalo Bills (2017); Cleveland Browns (2018); Arizona Cardinals (2019)*; Washington Redskins (2019); Arizona Cardinals (2019–2022); Minnesota Vikings (2023)*
- * Offseason or practice squad member only

Awards and highlights
- Second-team All-MWC (2014)

Career NFL statistics
- Total tackles: 114
- Sacks: 2.5
- Forced fumbles: 3
- Pass deflections: 2
- Stats at Pro Football Reference

Tanner Vallejo (born December 16, 1994) is an American former professional football player who was a linebacker in the National Football League (NFL). He played college football for the Boise State Broncos and was selected by the Buffalo Bills in the sixth round of the 2017 NFL draft. Vallejo has also played for the Cleveland Browns, the Washington Redskins and the Arizona Cardinals.

== Early life ==
Playing for Nevada Union High School, Vallejo earned MaxPreps All-American honors his senior year. In addition to football, he played baseball for Nevada Union. Tanner's grandfather was born in Ecuador.

== College career ==
Playing at Boise State, Vallejo had 100 tackles as a sophomore, but ended his final season of college ball early to have wrist surgery. During that sophomore season, he blocked two kicks in one game to help secure a 28–0 Broncos win. Pro Football Focus noted his speed and ability to break up plays in the backfield. However, they touched on his lack of size and poor tackling efficiency his senior year in their scouting report.

== Professional career ==
Pre-draft measurables
| Height | Weight | Arm length | Hand span | 40-yard dash | 10-yard split | 20-yard split | 20-yard shuttle | Three-cone drill | Vertical jump | Broad jump | Bench press |
|---|---|---|---|---|---|---|---|---|---|---|---|
| 6 ft 1 1/4 in (1.86 m) | 228 lb (103 kg) | 30 1/2 in (0.77 m) | 9 5/8 in (0.24 m) | 4.67 s | 1.62 s | 2.72 s | 4.30 s | 7.08 s | 33 1/2 in (0.85 m) | 10 ft 1 in (3.07 m) | 19 reps |
All values from NFL Combine

=== Buffalo Bills ===
The Buffalo Bills selected Vallejo in the sixth round (195th overall) of the 2017 NFL draft. He was the second linebacker drafted by the Bills in 2017, behind Matt Milano, and was expected to fill the Bills' immediate need at weak-side linebacker.

On May 11, 2017, the Bills signed Vallejo to a four-year, $2.55 million contract that includes a signing bonus of $153,799.

He injured his knee in the preseason but still managed to hang on to a roster spot.

Vallejo was waived by the Bills on September 1, 2018.

=== Cleveland Browns ===
On September 2, 2018, Vallejo was claimed off waivers by the Cleveland Browns. He played in 13 games before being placed on injured reserve on December 28, 2018, with a hamstring injury.

On February 4, 2019, Vallejo was waived by the Browns.

=== Arizona Cardinals (first stint) ===
On February 5, 2019, Vallejo was claimed off waivers by the Arizona Cardinals. Vallejo was waived following the final roster cuts on September 1, 2019.

=== Washington Redskins ===
Vallejo was claimed off waivers by the Washington Redskins on September 2, 2019. He was waived on November 16, 2019.

=== Arizona Cardinals (second stint) ===
On November 20, 2019, Vallejo was signed to the Cardinals practice squad. On December 4, 2019, Vallejo was promoted to the active roster. In Week 14 against the Pittsburgh Steelers, Vallejo recorded a sack on quarterback Devlin Hodges and forced a fumble on running back Benny Snell which was recovered by teammate Terrell Suggs in the 23–17 loss. He was placed on injured reserve on December 18, 2019.

In Week 17 of the 2020 season against the Los Angeles Rams, led the team with 12 tackles and recorded his first sack of the season on John Wolford during the 18–7 loss.

On March 17, 2021, Vallejo re-signed with the Cardinals on a two-year, $4.1 million contract. He was placed on injured reserve on November 20 with a knee injury. He was activated on January 1, 2022.

=== Minnesota Vikings ===
On August 13, 2023, Vallejo signed with the Minnesota Vikings. He was released on August 28, 2023.
