= Penn Valley Union Elementary School District =

School district in California, United States

Address
- 17328 Penn Valley Drive Penn Valley, California, 95946; United States

District information
- Type: Public
- Grades: K–12
- Schools: 3 K–8 Elementary, 1 K–12 Charter
- NCES District ID: 0601427

Students and staff
- Students: 564 (2020–2021)
- Teachers: 26.42 (FTE)
- Staff: 26.98 (FTE)
- Student–teacher ratio: 21.35:1

Other information
- Website: www.pvuesd.org

Penn Valley Union Elementary School District is a public school district based in Nevada County, California, United States.

The district includes Penn Valley, Lake Wildwood, and Rough and Ready.

== Schools ==
- Ready Springs Elementary School - A K-8 school
- Williams Ranch Elementary School - A K-5 school, K-3 prior to 2016
- Vantage Point Charter School

The district formerly operated Pleasant Valley Elementary School, which had grades 4-8. All of the school board members, in 2016, voted to close Pleasant Valley. Of the various options of closing a particular school, this was the one which was the least expensive for the school district.
