= Johann August Nahl =

German sculptor

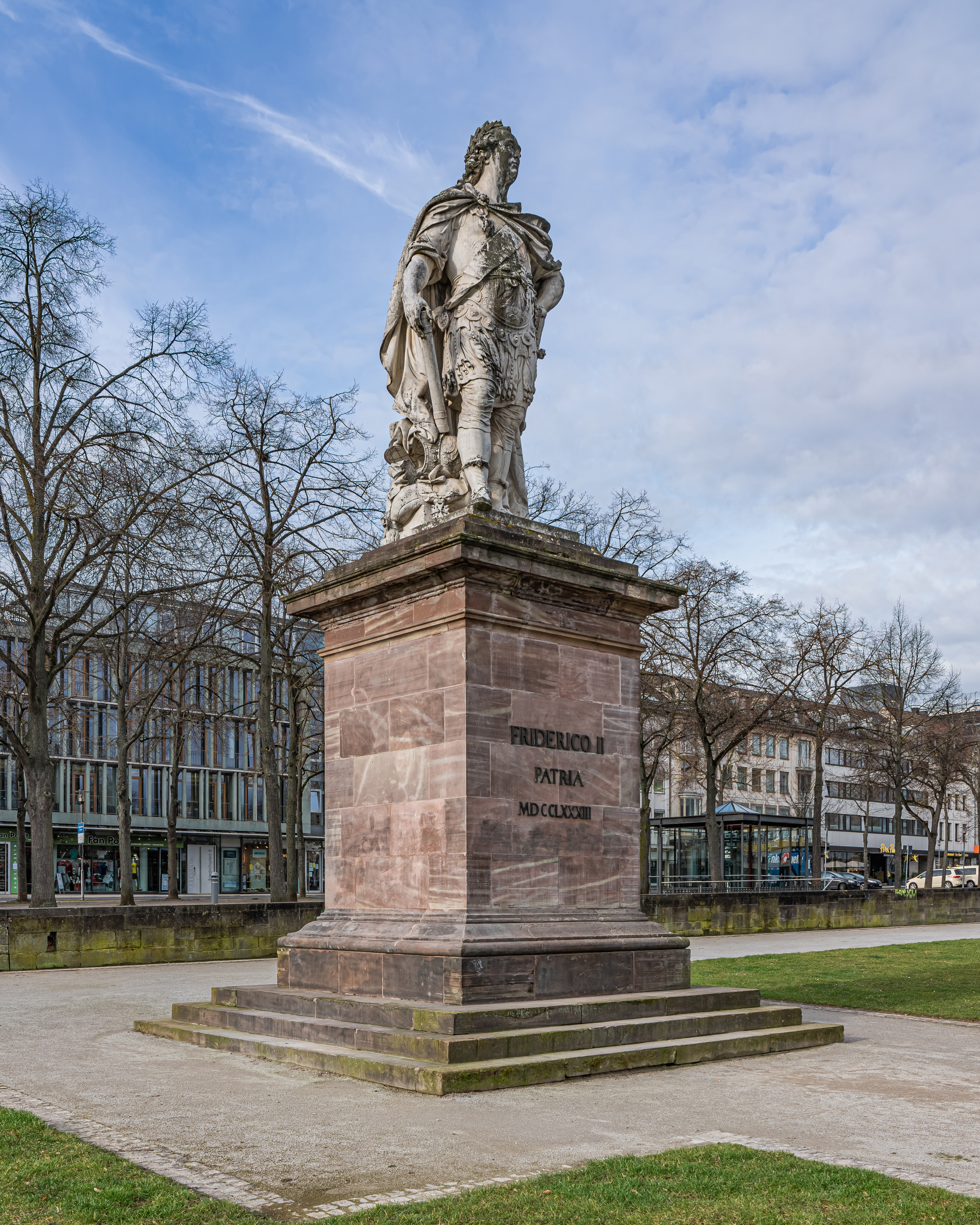
Monument to Frederick II in Kassel, later completed by Nahl's son

Johann August Nahl (22 August 1710 – 22 October 1781) was a German sculptor and plasterer.

He was born in Berlin. He was first taught by his father, Johann Samuel Nahl (1664–1727), who had been court sculptor of Frederic I since 1704. At the age of 18, Nahl undertook a journey via Sigmaringen and Bern to Strasbourg, where he worked for Robert Le Lorrain. In 1731, he went to Paris, then in 1734, to Rome, 1735 to Schaffhausen and then back to Strasbourg. Here he initially worked for the French royal steward François Klinglin and then later on the bishop's palace of Armand-Gaston de Rohan-Soubise. In 1736, he earned citizenship in Strasbourg.

Nahl is the author of the brass made in honour of Maria Magdalena Langhans, a clergyman's wife who died giving birth, in the church Hindelbank in the Ber Canton - this brass was one of the most admired in the 18th century. Regarding this, Johann Wolfgang Goethe wrote the following to Charlotte von Stein on 20 October 1779:

In order to hear about the tomb of the clergymen in the Hindelbank you will have to have patience, for I have much to tell on, about and for it. It is a subject about which one could read many a long chapter. I wish I were able to write everything down right now. I have heard so much about it and consumed it, so to speak. People readily speak with firm enthusiasm about such things, and nobody looks at what the artist has done, or indeed wanted to do.

Nahl died in 1781 in Kassel.

== Personal life ==
His great-grandsons were the half-brothers Charles Christian Nahl and Hugo Wilhelm Arthur Nahl, painters of the American Old West.
