= Charles Christian Nahl =

German American painter

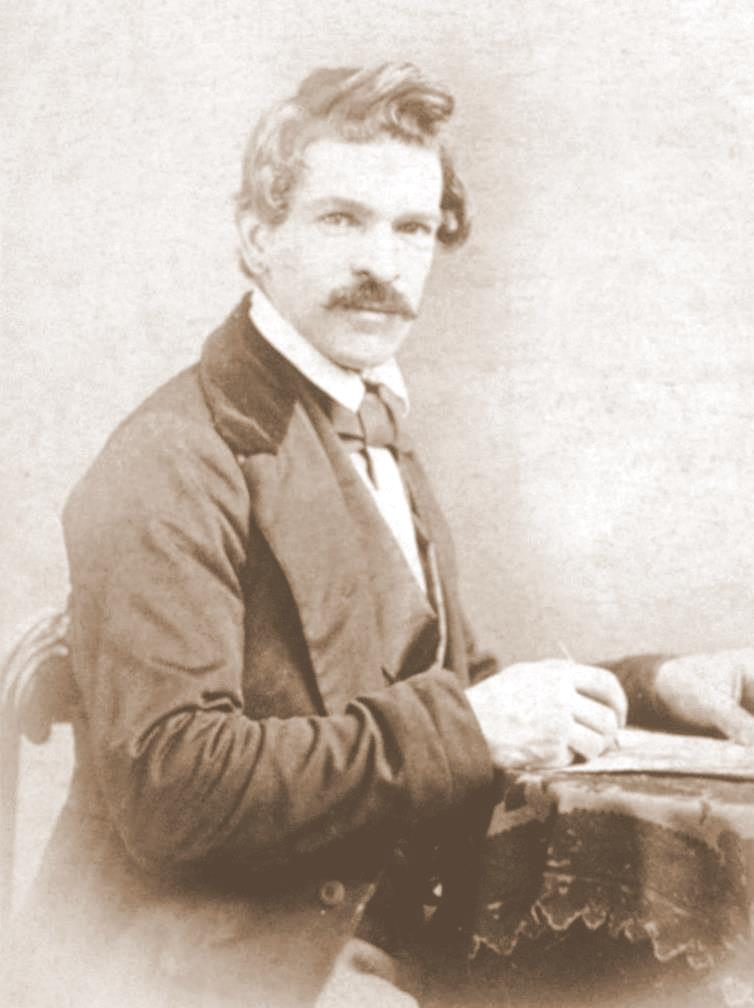
Charles Christian Nahl

Carl Christian Heinrich Nahl (October 18, 1818 – March 1, 1878), later known as Charles Nahl (sometimes he is recorded as Karl Nahl, Charles Christian Nahl or Charles C. Nahl), was a German-born painter who lived in the United States for the last half of his life. He lived most of those 30 years in California and is considered among the state's first significant painters.

Leaving political unrest in the Electorate of Hesse and France, Nahl immigrated to New York City in 1848 with family and friends. He moved to California the following year, at first hoping for luck in the gold rush. He and his family settled in what became part of the United States, living in Sacramento until 1852 and then in San Francisco.

== Early years ==
Born in 1818, Carl Christian Nahl was the son of Georg Valentin Friedrich Nahl (1791–1857) and Henriette (Weickh) Nahl (1796–1863). His parents divorced in 1826. He came from a long line of artists and sculptors. His great-grandfather was Johann August Nahl, a German sculptor and Stuckist.

Nahl was trained at the Kassel Academy.

== Career ==
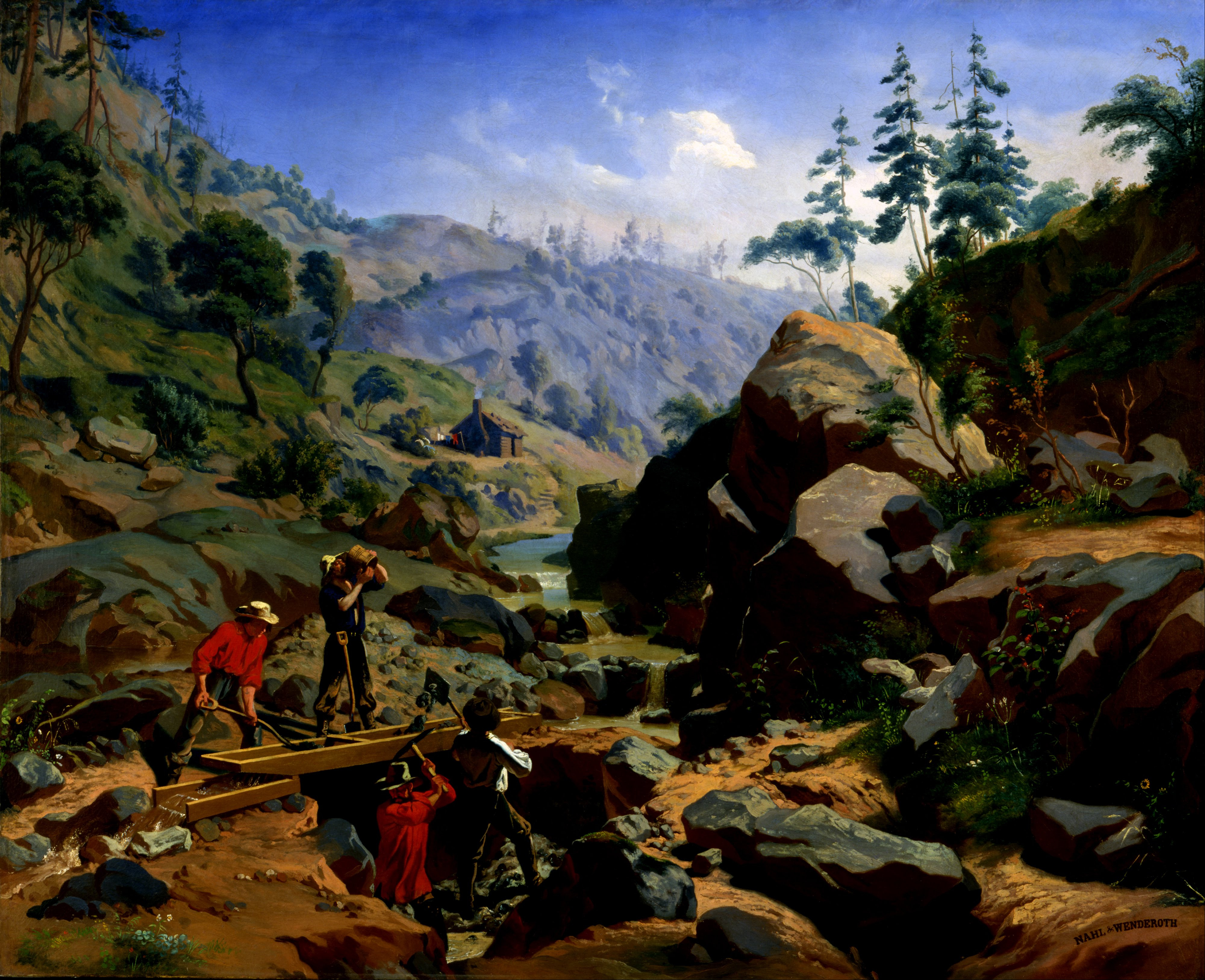
Miners in the Sierras

At the time of rising political tensions in Electorate of Hesse in the 1840s, Nahl and his friend Frederick August Wenderoth (1819–1884) moved to Paris in 1846. There he enjoyed some success at the salon and changed his name to the French version, "Charles".

The February Revolution of 1848 prompted another move by Nahl and Wenderoth. They were accompanied this time by Nahl's mother and siblings, including half-brother Hugo Wilhelm Arthur Nahl (1833–1889) and half-sister Laura Nahl (d. 1857). They emigrated to Brooklyn, New York, where they heard of the gold strike.

Nahl reached Nevada City, California the next year, and moved to Rough and Ready, California. Here, he mistakenly purchased a "salted" mine.

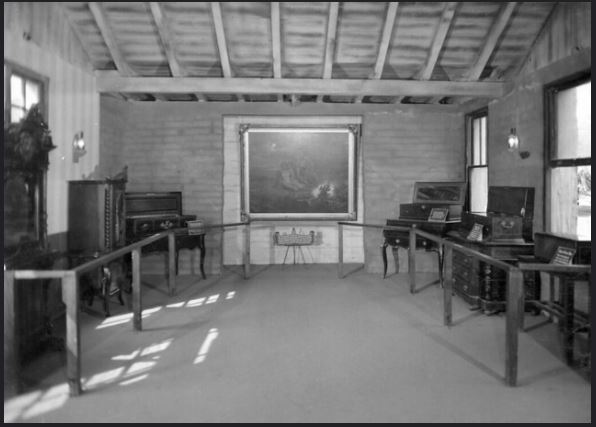
Nahl's painting of a Native American family entitled "Night Watch" was purchased by Walter Knott on the recommendation of his art director Paul von Klieben and displayed for many years at Knott's Berry Farm as shown in this photo. It was later donated by Knott descendants to the Orange County Museum of Art.

Having no luck in mining along the Yuba River, Nahl and his young half-brother Arthur opened a studio with Wenderoth in Sacramento, which was booming with mining-related businesses. They painted images of miners and life on the frontier. After the 1852 Sacramento fire, they moved to San Francisco. (Arthur Nahl made an illustration of the fire).

Wenderoth left for a trip to the South Seas and Australia, through 1853. After his return, in 1856, he married Laura Nahl, his friend's half-sister. They moved to Philadelphia, Pennsylvania, where they intended to settle. Laura died later that year or in 1857, in the birth of their first child, who also died. Wenderoth lived and worked for a time in South Carolina, then returned to Philadelphia.

== Olympic Club ==
The Nahl brothers were also fine athletes. At their home in San Francisco's Bush Street, they created a backyard gymnasium that served as the early version of the Olympic Club. It was the headquarters for the club from 1855 to 1860. His brother Arthur Nahl suggested naming it the "San Francisco Olympic Club". At the inaugural meeting on May 6, 1860, Arthur Nahl was elected as its Leader.

== Selected gallery ==
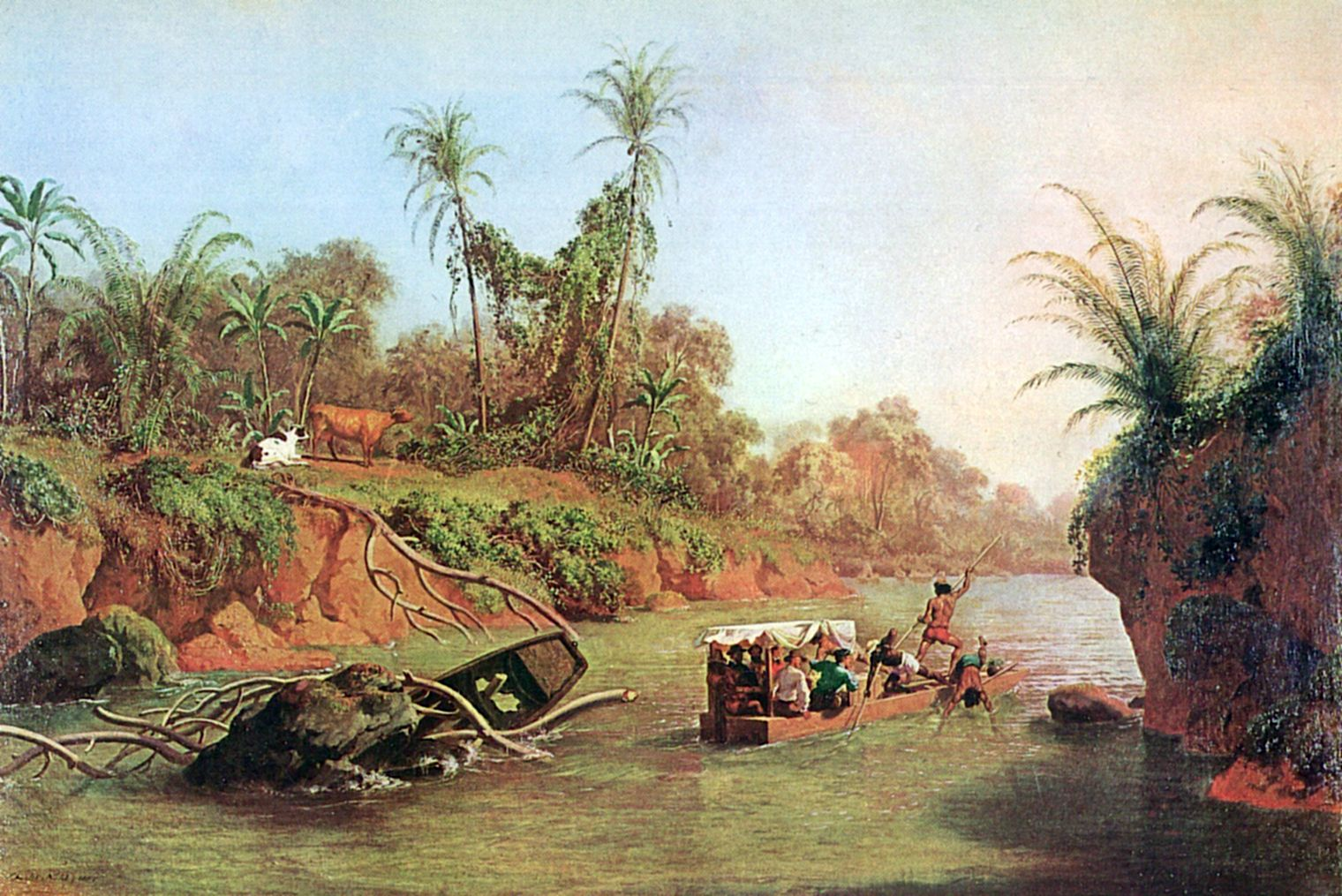
Incident on the Chagres River (Nahl, 1850), Bancroft Library

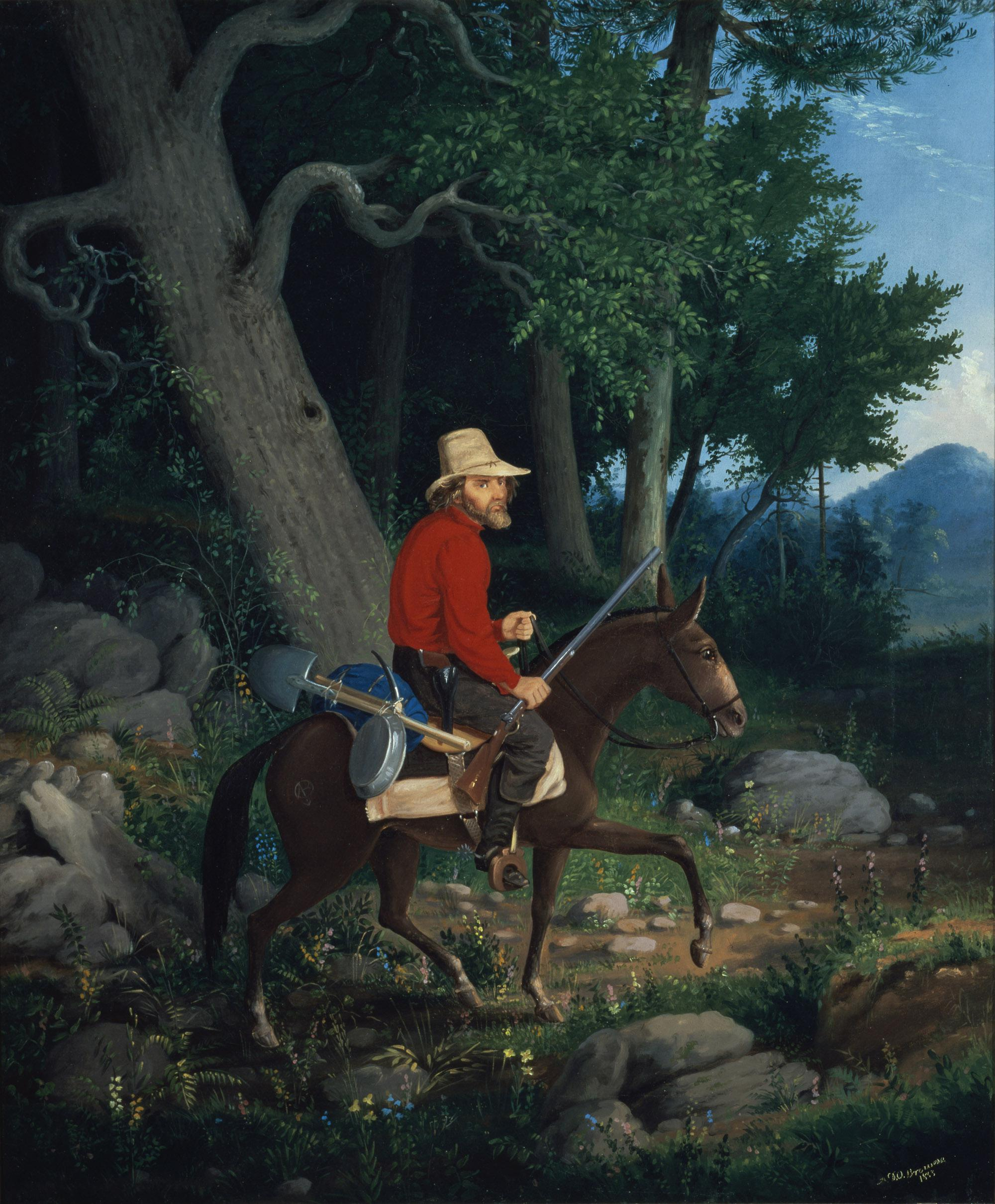
The lone prospector, 1853, Browere

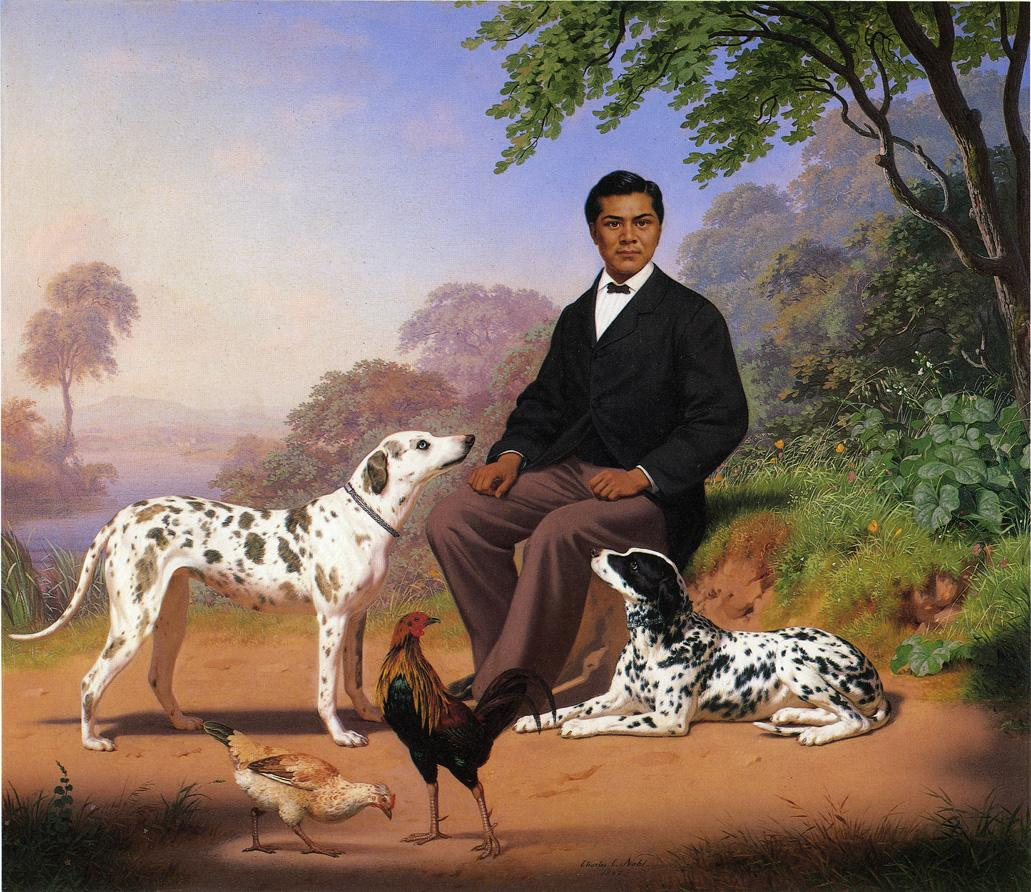
Unidentified Man (Nahl, 1867), de Young Museum, San Francisco.

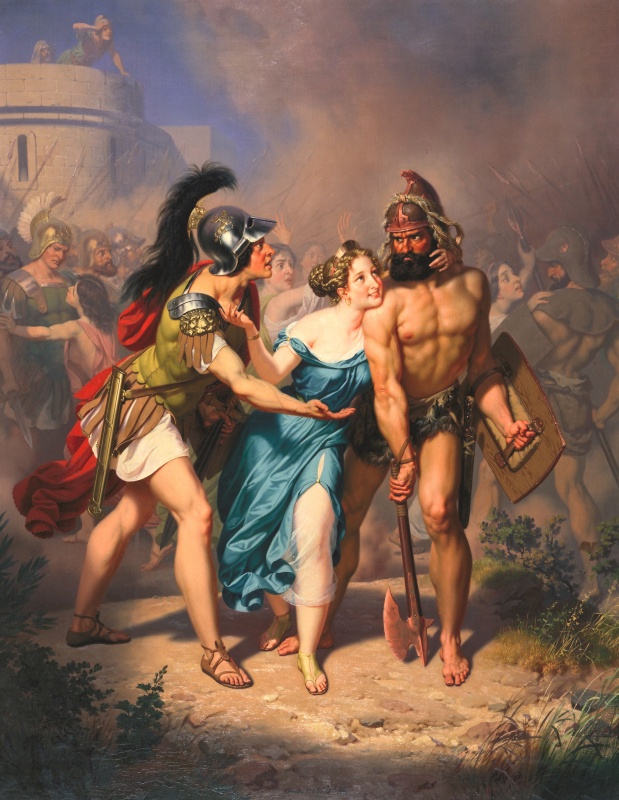
The Rape Of The Sabines—The Invasion (Nahl, 1871), Crocker Art Museum

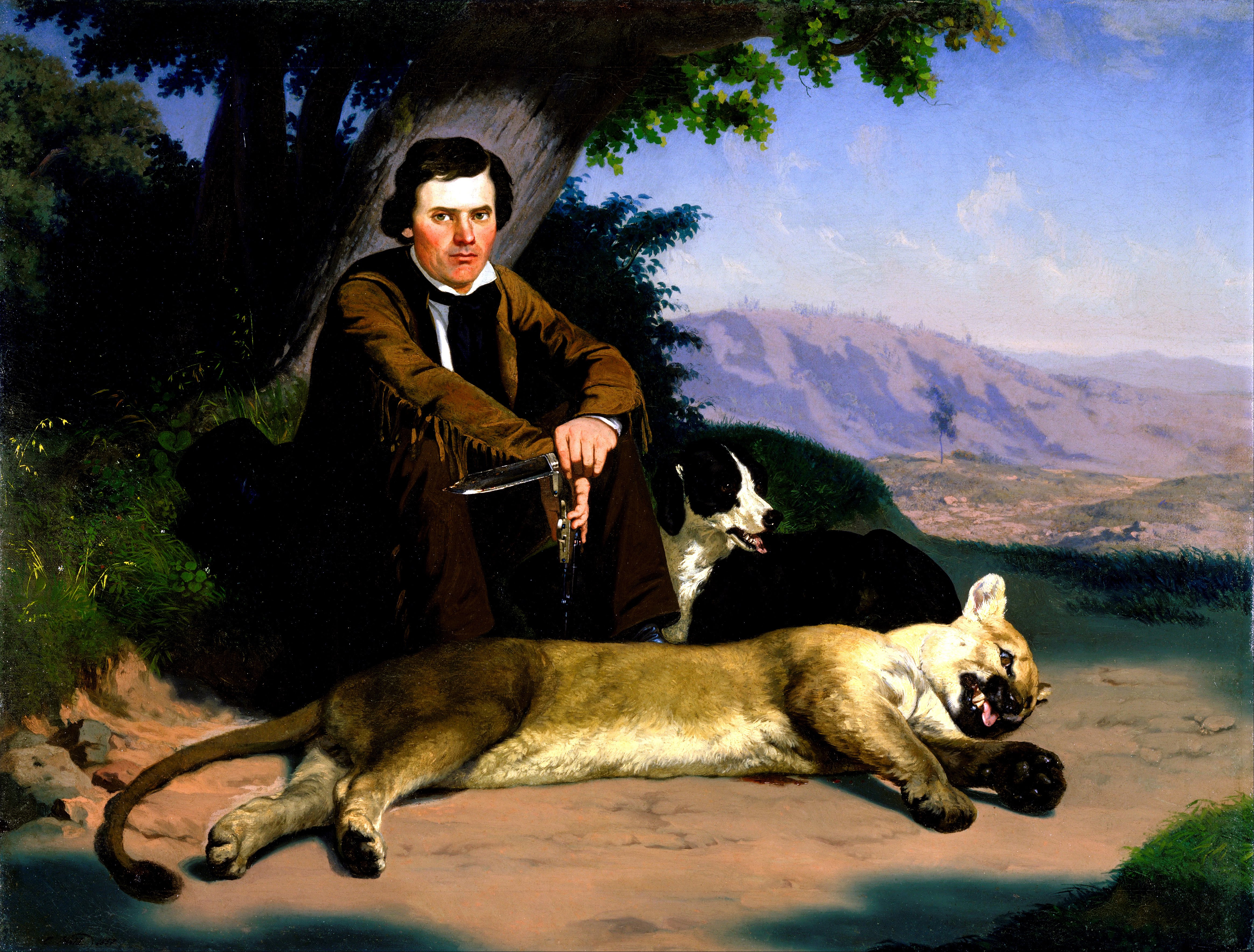
Peter Quivey and the Mountain Lion, Nahl
