= Penn Valley, California =

Penn Valley
- Census-designated place
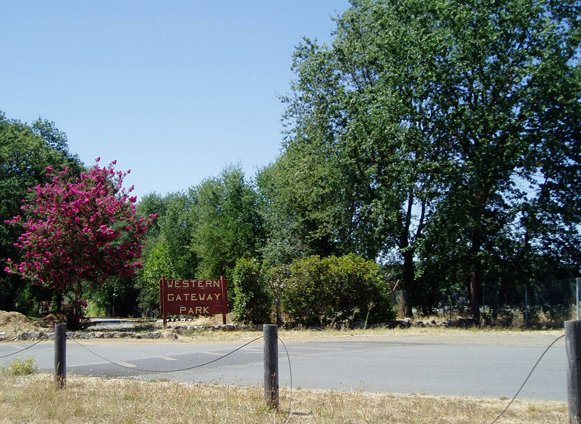
- Western Gateway Park

- Location in Nevada County and the state of California

- Location in California Location in the United States
- Coordinates: 39°11′54″N 121°11′20″W
- Country: United States
- State: California
- County: Nevada

Area
  - Total: 2.122 sq mi (5.495 km^{2})
  - Land: 2.122 sq mi (5.495 km^{2})
  - Water: 0 sq mi (0 km^{2}) 0%
- Elevation: 1,401 ft (427 m)

Population (2020)
  - Total: 1,593
  - Density: 750.8/sq mi (289.9/km^{2})
- Demonym: Penn Valleyian
- Time zone: UTC-8 (Pacific (PST))
  - Summer (DST): UTC-7 (PDT)
- ZIP code: 95946
- Area code: 530
- FIPS code: 06-56518
- GNIS feature ID: 1867050

Penn Valley is a census-designated place (CDP) in Nevada County, California. The population was 1,593 at the 2020 census, down from 1,621 at the 2010 census. The large Lake Wildwood master-planned community, although a separate CDP, has a Penn Valley postal address, and is sometimes considered part of the general Penn Valley community.

== History ==
The community may be named for Madame Penn, the original owner of the town site.

== Geography ==
Penn Valley is located at 39°11′54″N 121°11′20″W (39.198214, -121.188965).

According to the United States Census Bureau, the CDP has a total area of 2.1 square miles (5.4 km^{2}), all of it land.

== Demographics ==
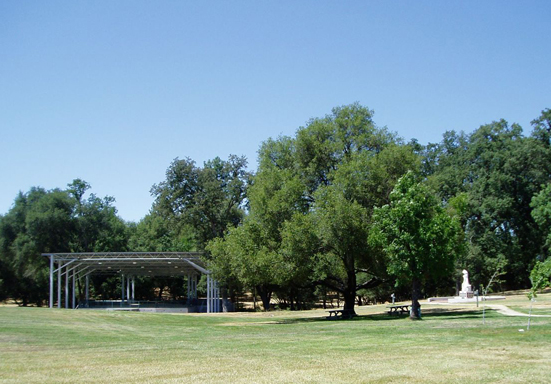
Western Gateway Park

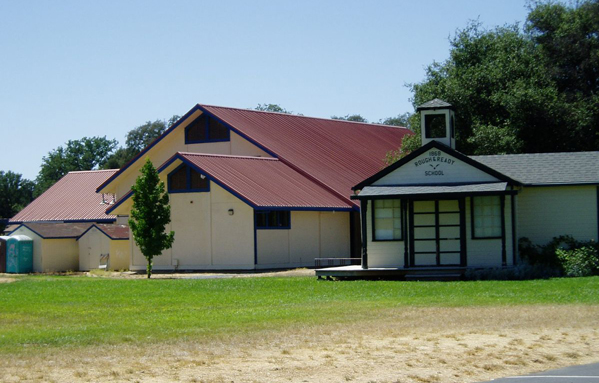
Ready Springs School

Historical population
Census	Pop.	Note	%±
1980	1,032		—
1990	1,242		20.3%
2000	1,387		11.7%
2010	1,621		16.9%
2020	1,593		−1.7%
U.S. Decennial Census; 1860–1870 1880-1890; 1900 1910 1920; 1930 1940 1950; 1960 1970 1980; 1990 2000 2010

Penn Valley first appeared as a census designated place in the 1980 United States census.

=== 2020 census ===
As of the 2020 census, Penn Valley had a population of 1,593. The population density was 751.1 inhabitants per square mile (290.0/km^{2}). 0.0% of residents lived in urban areas, while 100.0% lived in rural areas.

Racial composition as of the 2020 census
Race	Number	Percent
White	1,295	81.3%
Black or African American	12	0.8%
American Indian and Alaska Native	15	0.9%
Asian	9	0.6%
Native Hawaiian and Other Pacific Islander	6	0.4%
Some other race	48	3.0%
Two or more races	208	13.1%
Hispanic or Latino (of any race)	172	10.8%

The census reported that 1,574 people (98.8% of the population) lived in households, 19 (1.2%) lived in non-institutionalized group quarters, and no one was institutionalized.

There were 624 households, out of which 173 (27.7%) had children under the age of 18 living in them, 311 (49.8%) were married-couple households, 44 (7.1%) were cohabiting couple households, 155 (24.8%) had a female householder with no spouse or partner present, and 114 (18.3%) had a male householder with no spouse or partner present. 166 households (26.6%) were one person, and 89 (14.3%) were one person aged 65 or older. The average household size was 2.52, and there were 419 families (67.1% of all households).

The age distribution was 317 people (19.9%) under the age of 18, 104 people (6.5%) aged 18 to 24, 352 people (22.1%) aged 25 to 44, 445 people (27.9%) aged 45 to 64, and 375 people (23.5%) who were 65 years of age or older. The median age was 47.4 years. For every 100 females, there were 96.9 males, and for every 100 females age 18 and over, there were 93.0 males.

There were 665 housing units at an average density of 313.5 units per square mile (121.0 units/km^{2}), of which 624 (93.8%) were occupied. Of these, 489 (78.4%) were owner-occupied, and 135 (21.6%) were occupied by renters. 6.2% of housing units were vacant; the homeowner vacancy rate was 3.2% and the rental vacancy rate was 7.5%.

=== Income and poverty ===
In 2023, the US Census Bureau estimated that the median household income was $62,966, and the per capita income was $41,127. About 2.4% of families and 11.9% of the population were below the poverty line.

=== 2010 census ===
The 2010 United States census reported that Penn Valley had a population of 1,621. The population density was 764.1 inhabitants per square mile (295.0/km^{2}). The racial makeup of Penn Valley was 1,434 (88.5%) White, 9 (0.6%) African American, 34 (2.1%) Native American, 23 (1.4%) Asian, 0 (0.0%) Pacific Islander, 31 (1.9%) from other races, and 90 (5.6%) from two or more races. Hispanic or Latino of any race were 143 persons (8.8%).

The Census reported that 1,611 people (99.4% of the population) lived in households, 10 (0.6%) lived in non-institutionalized group quarters, and 0 (0%) were institutionalized.

There were 628 households, out of which 195 (31.1%) had children under the age of 18 living in them, 301 (47.9%) were opposite-sex married couples living together, 91 (14.5%) had a female householder with no husband present, 41 (6.5%) had a male householder with no wife present. There were 36 (5.7%) unmarried opposite-sex partnerships, and 3 (0.5%) same-sex married couples or partnerships. 163 households (26.0%) were made up of individuals, and 74 (11.8%) had someone living alone who was 65 years of age or older. The average household size was 2.57. There were 433 families (68.9% of all households); the average family size was 3.02.

The population was spread out, with 363 people (22.4%) under the age of 18, 136 people (8.4%) aged 18 to 24, 321 people (19.8%) aged 25 to 44, 506 people (31.2%) aged 45 to 64, and 295 people (18.2%) who were 65 years of age or older. The median age was 44.5 years. For every 100 females, there were 93.7 males. For every 100 females age 18 and over, there were 89.2 males.

There were 666 housing units at an average density of 313.9 per square mile (121.2/km^{2}), of which 485 (77.2%) were owner-occupied, and 143 (22.8%) were occupied by renters. The homeowner vacancy rate was 2.6%; the rental vacancy rate was 3.3%. 1,186 people (73.2% of the population) lived in owner-occupied housing units and 425 people (26.2%) lived in rental housing units.

== Politics ==
In the state legislature, Penn Valley is in the 1st senatorial district, represented by Republican Megan Dahle, and the 1st Assembly district, represented by Republican Heather Hadwick.

Federally, Penn Valley is in California's 3rd congressional district, represented by Independent Kevin Kiley.

== Recreation ==
- Lake Wildwood
- Englebright Lake
- Yuba River
- Bridgeport Covered Bridge

== Tourism ==
Penn Valley hosts a rodeo event each year in late Spring and has attracted as many as 5,000 spectators during one of its events. The Penn Valley Rodeo is organized by Penn Valley Community Rodeo Association since 2005.

In the 1950s, the Penn Valley Fire Dept. needed funds. George Alan Smith, a local cowboy and heavy equipment operator, came up with the idea of holding a rodeo. George enlisted the help of friends and relatives on weekends, evenings, and holidays to set posts, build fence and chutes, and put up bleachers. The first rodeo was a success, and it took on a life of its own. The local Fire Department and residents volunteered their time and efforts to help put on the annual event. The Penn Valley Rodeo quickly became "the summer event" for people from all over California to attend.

== Education ==
It is in the Penn Valley Union Elementary School District and the Nevada Joint Union High School District.

== Notable residents ==
- Chuck Yeager, retired General in the United States Air Force and first man to break the sound barrier.
- Tanner Vallejo, NFL football player.
