= Lake Wildwood, California =

Lake Wildwood
- Unincorporated Community; Census Designated Place
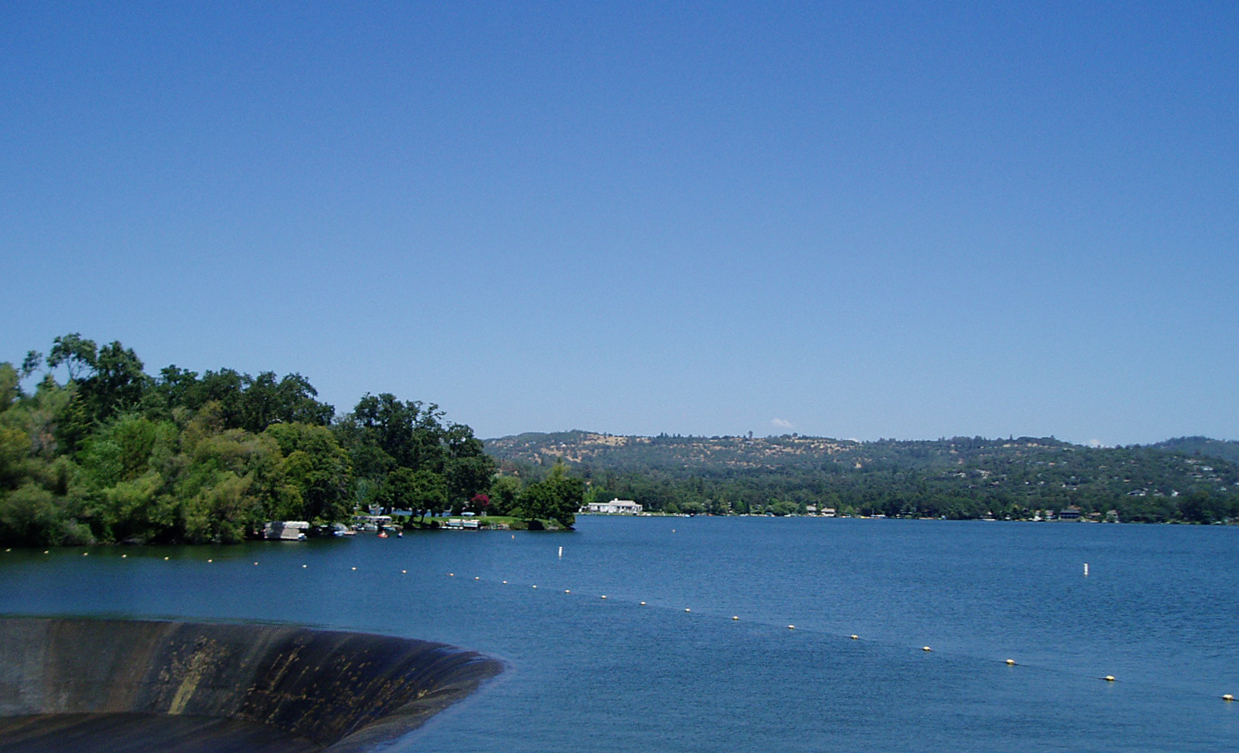
- Lake Wildwood

- Location in Nevada County and the state of California

- Location in the United States
- Coordinates: 39°14′6″N 121°12′11″W
- Country: United States
- State: California
- County: Nevada

Area
  - Total: 3.511 sq mi (9.093 km^{2})
  - Land: 3.058 sq mi (7.920 km^{2})
  - Water: 0.453 sq mi (1.172 km^{2}) 12.89%
- Elevation: 1,529 ft (466 m)

Population (2020)
  - Total: 5,158
  - Density: 1,687/sq mi (651.3/km^{2})
- Time zone: UTC-8 (Pacific (PST))
  - Summer (DST): UTC-7 (PDT)
- ZIP code: 95946
- Area codes: 530, 837
- FIPS code: 06-39885
- GNIS feature ID: 1682906

Lake Wildwood is a census-designated place (CDP) in Nevada County, California, United States. The population was 5,158 at the 2020 census, up from 4,991 at the 2010 census.

Lake Wildwood is mainly a gated community and news about the CDP is published in a twice a month newspaper, The Wildwood Independent. Local businesses and residences are listed in the annual "Penn Valley Area Directory" published by "Pine Tree Press".

== History ==
Lake Wildwood was laid out by property developers in the 1960s.

In September 1988, the 49er Fire was accidentally started by a homeless and schizophrenic local man near Highway 49. The fire went on to burn well over a hundred homes and more than 33,000 acres in Nevada County, including many homes in the Lake Wildwood area.

== Geography ==
Lake Wildwood is located at 39°14′6″N 121°12′11″W (39.234885, -121.203026).

According to the United States Census Bureau, the CDP has a total area of 3.5 square miles (9.1 km^{2}), of which 3.1 square miles (8.0 km^{2}) is land and 0.5 square miles (1.3 km^{2}) (12.89%) is water.

== Demographics ==
Historical population
Census	Pop.	Note	%±
2000	4,868		—
2010	4,991		2.5%
2020	5,158		3.3%
U.S. Decennial Census; 1860–1870 1880-1890; 1900 1910 1920; 1930 1940 1950; 1960 1970 1980; 1990 2000 2010

Lake Wildwood first appeared as a census designated place in the 2000 U.S. census.

=== 2020 census ===
As of the 2020 census, Lake Wildwood had a population of 5,158 and a population density of 1,686.7 inhabitants per square mile (651.2/km^{2}). The census reported that 0.0% of residents lived in urban areas and 100.0% lived in rural areas.

The age distribution was 14.9% under the age of 18, 4.5% aged 18 to 24, 15.3% aged 25 to 44, 23.0% aged 45 to 64, and 42.4% who were 65 years of age or older. The median age was 60.5 years. For every 100 females, there were 92.0 males, and for every 100 females age 18 and over, there were 91.0 males.

The census reported that 99.8% of the population lived in households, 12 people (0.2%) lived in non-institutionalized group quarters, and no one was institutionalized. There were 2,274 households, of which 17.3% had children under the age of 18 living in them. Of all households, 61.0% were married-couple households, 5.1% were cohabiting-couple households, 11.7% were households with a male householder and no spouse or partner present, and 22.2% were households with a female householder and no spouse or partner present. About 23.7% of all households were made up of individuals, and 16.4% had someone living alone who was 65 years of age or older. The average household size was 2.26. There were 1,604 families (70.5% of all households).

There were 2,657 housing units at an average density of 868.9 units per square mile (335.5 units/km^{2}), of which 2,274 (85.6%) were occupied. Of the occupied units, 84.6% were owner-occupied and 15.4% were occupied by renters. The vacancy rate was 14.4%; the homeowner vacancy rate was 3.2%, and the rental vacancy rate was 3.0%.

Racial composition as of the 2020 census
Race	Number	Percent
White	4,426	85.8%
Black or African American	32	0.6%
American Indian and Alaska Native	26	0.5%
Asian	88	1.7%
Native Hawaiian and Other Pacific Islander	6	0.1%
Some other race	104	2.0%
Two or more races	476	9.2%
Hispanic or Latino (of any race)	455	8.8%

=== Income and poverty ===
In 2023, the US Census Bureau estimated that the median household income was $87,552, and the per capita income was $42,709. About 6.3% of families and 13.0% of the population were below the poverty line.

=== 2010 census ===
The 2010 United States census reported that Lake Wildwood had a population of 4,991. The population density was 1,421.3 inhabitants per square mile (548.8/km^{2}). The racial makeup of Lake Wildwood was 4,726 (94.7%) White, 17 (0.3%) African American, 46 (0.9%) Native American, 56 (1.1%) Asian, 10 (0.2%) Pacific Islander, 32 (0.6%) from other races, and 104 (2.1%) from two or more races. Hispanic or Latino of any race were 272 persons (5.4%).

The Census reported that 4,988 people (99.9% of the population) lived in households, 3 (0.1%) lived in non-institutionalized group quarters, and 0 (0%) were institutionalized.

There were 2,225 households, out of which 462 (20.8%) had children under the age of 18 living in them, 1,463 (65.8%) were opposite-sex married couples living together, 125 (5.6%) had a female householder with no husband present, 57 (2.6%) had a male householder with no wife present. There were 64 (2.9%) unmarried opposite-sex partnerships, and 15 (0.7%) same-sex married couples or partnerships. 496 households (22.3%) were made up of individuals, and 334 (15.0%) had someone living alone who was 65 years of age or older. The average household size was 2.24. There were 1,645 families (73.9% of all households); the average family size was 2.58.

The population was spread out, with 843 people (16.9%) under the age of 18, 204 people (4.1%) aged 18 to 24, 689 people (13.8%) aged 25 to 44, 1,412 people (28.3%) aged 45 to 64, and 1,843 people (36.9%) who were 65 years of age or older. The median age was 58.4 years. For every 100 females, there were 92.6 males. For every 100 females age 18 and over, there were 91.3 males.

There were 2,641 housing units at an average density of 752.1 per square mile (290.4/km^{2}), of which 1,856 (83.4%) were owner-occupied, and 369 (16.6%) were occupied by renters. The homeowner vacancy rate was 3.2%; the rental vacancy rate was 6.8%. 3,937 people (78.9% of the population) lived in owner-occupied housing units and 1,051 people (21.1%) lived in rental housing units.

== Politics ==
In the state legislature Lake Wildwood is located in the 1st senatorial district, represented by Republican Megan Dahle, and the 1st Assembly district, represented by Republican Heather Hadwick.

Federally, Lake Wildwood is in California's 3rd congressional district, represented by Independent Kevin Kiley.

Lake Wildwood is represented on the Nevada County Board of Supervisors by Republican Susan Hoek, a fifth-generation Nevada County resident who works on her family ranch.

== Education ==
It is in the Penn Valley Union Elementary School District and the Nevada Joint Union High School District.
