= Rough and Ready, California =

Rough and Ready
- Census-designated place
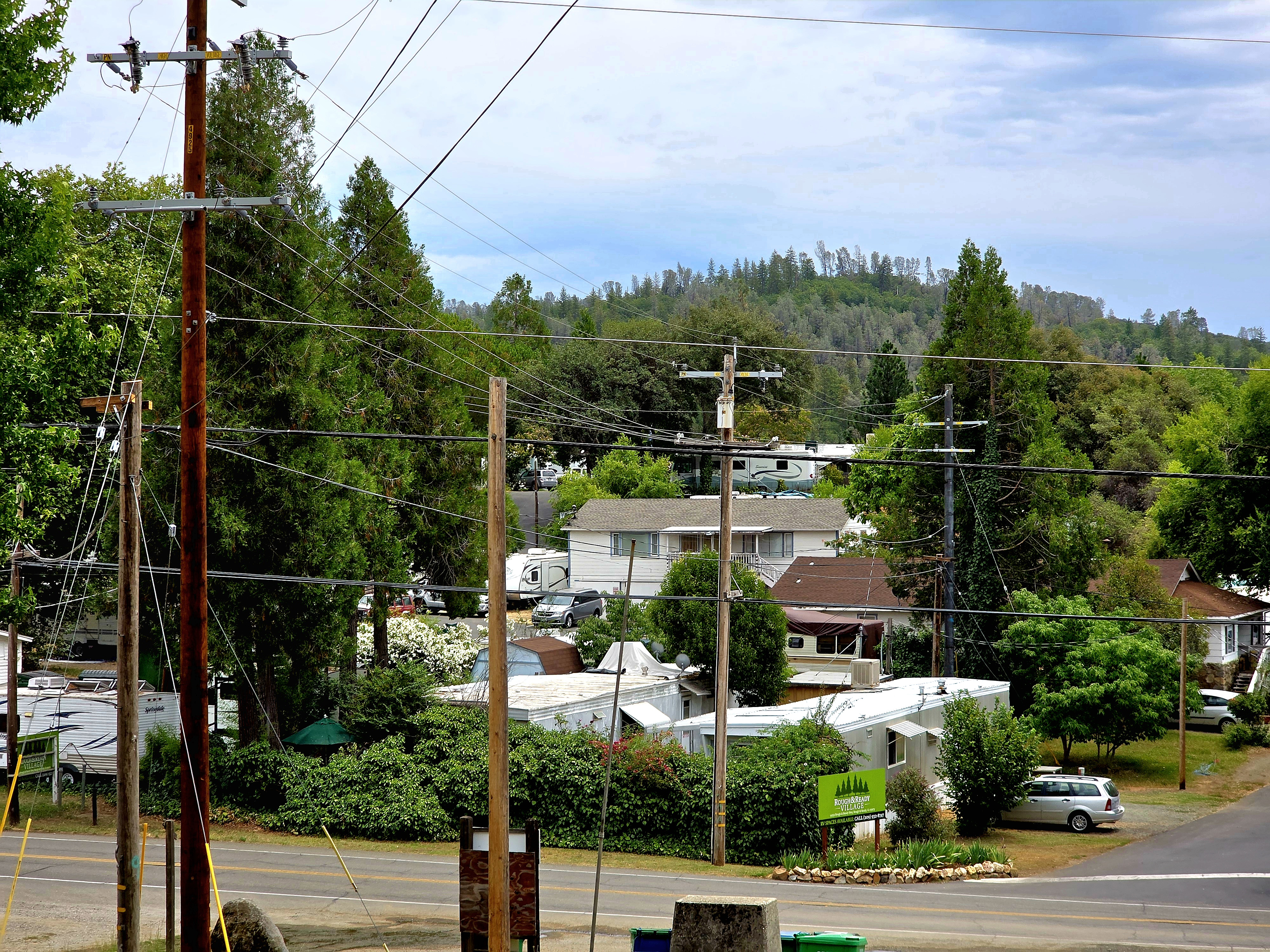
- A view of Rough and Ready

- Flag

- Location within the state of California Rough and Ready (the United States)
- Coordinates: 39°13′49″N 121°8′6″W
- Country: United States
- State: California
- County: Nevada

Area
  - Total: 3.173 sq mi (8.218 km^{2})
  - Land: 3.173 sq mi (8.218 km^{2})
  - Water: 0 sq mi (0 km^{2}) 0%

Population (2020)
  - Total: 905
  - Density: 285/sq mi (110/km^{2})
- Time zone: UTC-8 (Pacific (PST))
  - Summer (DST): UTC-7 (PDT)
- ZIP codes: 95975
- Area codes: 530, 837
- GNIS feature ID: 2628785

California Historical Landmark
- Official name: Little Town of Rough and Ready
- Reference no.: 294

Rough and Ready is a census-designated place in Nevada County, California, United States. It is located west of Grass Valley, California, approximately 62 miles (100 km) from Sacramento. The population was 905 at the 2020 census. It has frequently been noted on lists of unusual place names.

== History ==
The first established settlement in Rough and Ready was made in the fall of 1849 by a mining company from Wisconsin, known as the Rough and Ready Company, during the California Gold Rush. Their leader, Captain A. A. Townsend, named the company after General Zachary Taylor (nicknamed "Old Rough and Ready") who had recently been elected the 12th President of the United States. Captain Townsend had served under Taylor when he commanded the American Forces during the Black Hawk War (1832). California had three towns so named of which this one survives.

The town declared its secession from the Union as The Great Republic of Rough and Ready on 7 April 1850, largely to avoid mining taxes, but voted to rejoin the Union less than three months later on 4 July. The old republic is celebrated annually as a way to attract tourism and as a point of local pride.

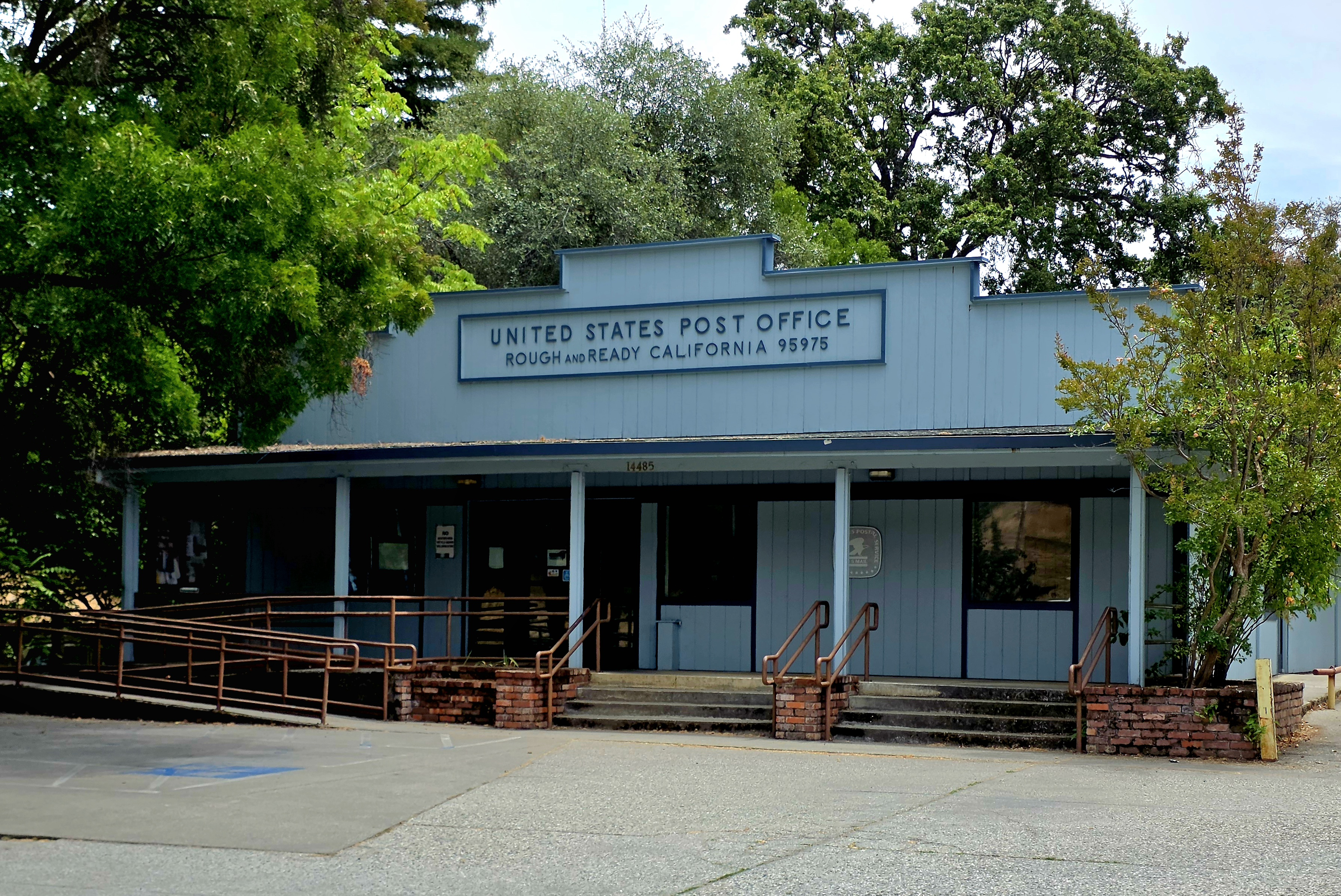
Current United States Post Office in Rough and Ready

The post office at Rough and Ready was established by February 1851; the first postmaster was Marcus Nutting. The ZIP Code is 95975. The community is inside area code 530.

The post office was closed for a time in 1855, again for a time in 1913, and again from 1942 to 1948.

In 1988, the 49er Fire was accidentally started near Highway 49. The fire went on to burn well over a hundred homes and more than 33,000 acres in Nevada County, including structures in and around Rough and Ready.

== Present day ==
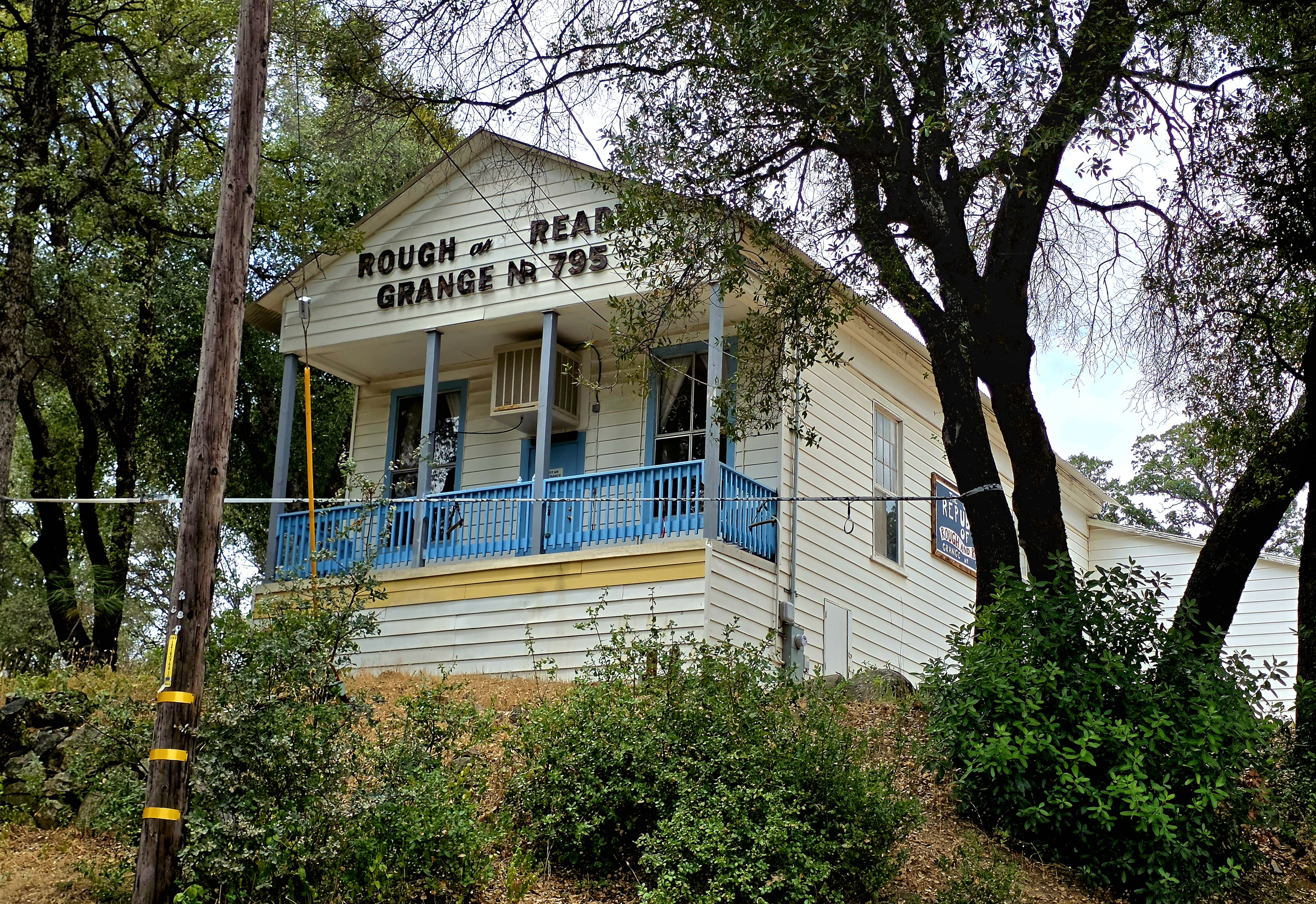
Grange Hall in Rough and Ready

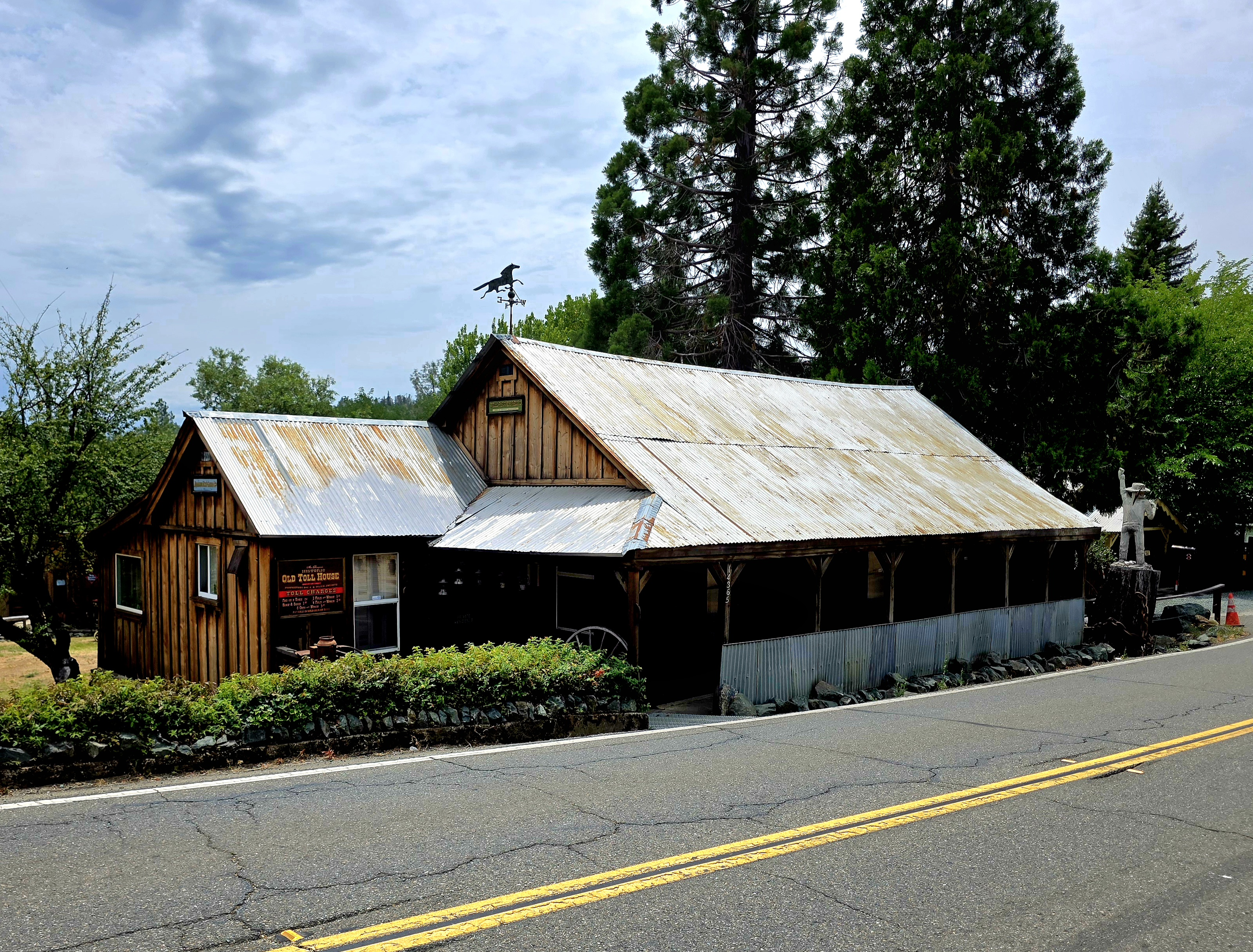
Old Toll House in Rough and Ready

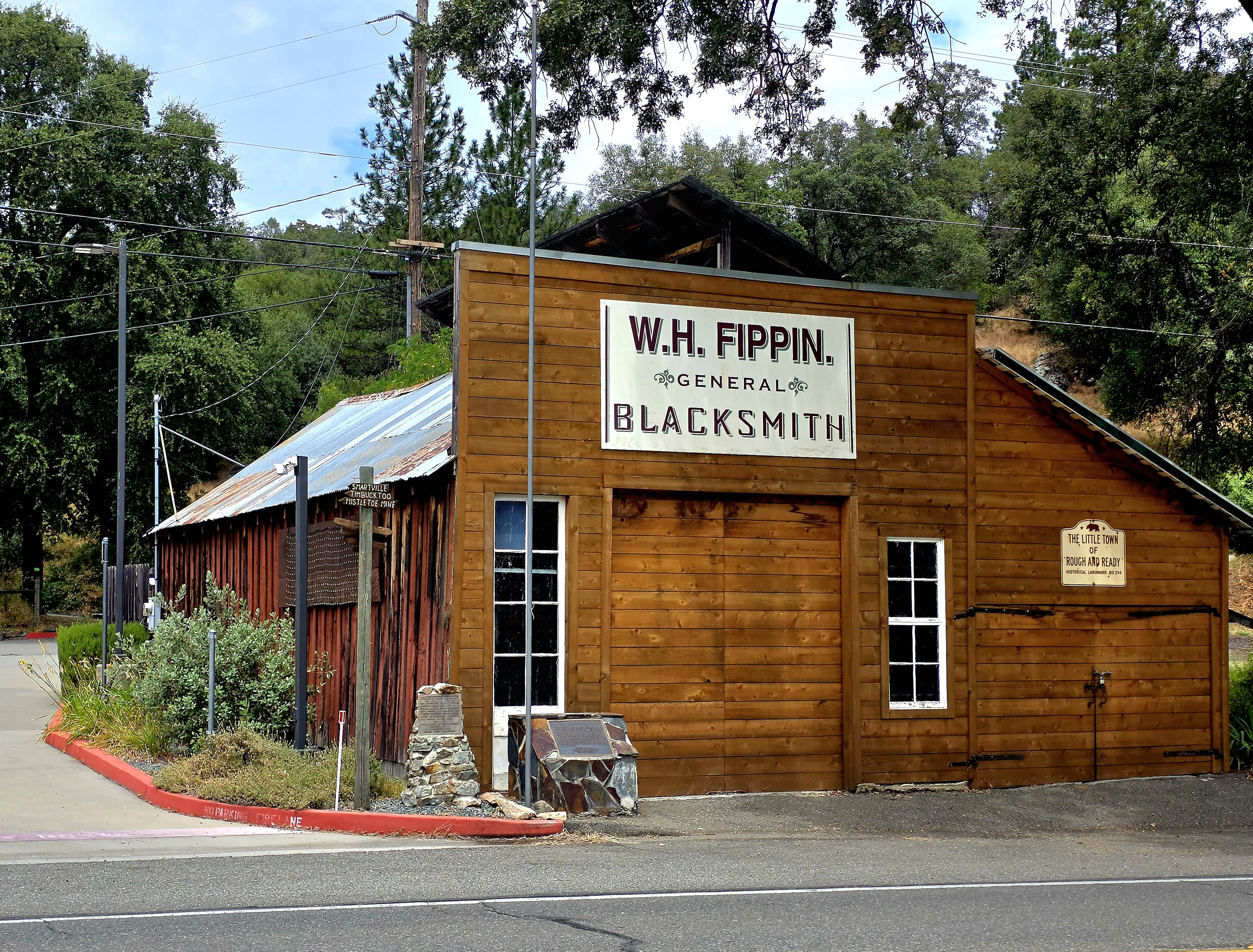
Fippin's Blacksmith Shop in Rough and Ready, California

The community is located on the Rough and Ready Highway. It was bypassed by State Route 20 in the mid-1980s. Among the oldest buildings are the blacksmith shop (1850s), the Odd Fellows Hall (1854) (now Rough and Ready Grange Hall), and the Old Toll House.

The town of Rough and Ready is honored as a California Historical Landmark (#294).

== Geography ==
According to the United States Census Bureau, the Census Designated Place covers an area of 3.2 square miles (8.3 km^{2}), all of it land.

== Demographics ==
Historical population
Census	Pop.	Note	%±
2000	1,595		—
2010	963		−39.6%
2020	905		−6.0%

The 2020 United States census reported that Rough and Ready had a population of 905. The population density was 285.2 inhabitants per square mile (110.1/km^{2}). The racial makeup of Rough and Ready was 761 (84.1%) White, 6 (0.7%) African American, 14 (1.5%) Native American, 13 (1.4%) Asian, 1 (0.1%) Pacific Islander, 33 (3.6%) from other races, and 77 (8.5%) from two or more races. Hispanic or Latino of any race were 67 persons (7.4%).

The whole population lived in households. There were 399 households, out of which 79 (19.8%) had children under the age of 18 living in them, 172 (43.1%) were married-couple households, 47 (11.8%) were cohabiting couple households, 85 (21.3%) had a female householder with no partner present, and 95 (23.8%) had a male householder with no partner present. 111 households (27.8%) were one person, and 52 (13.0%) were one person aged 65 or older. The average household size was 2.27. There were 246 families (61.7% of all households).

The age distribution was 108 people (11.9%) under the age of 18, 66 people (7.3%) aged 18 to 24, 209 people (23.1%) aged 25 to 44, 260 people (28.7%) aged 45 to 64, and 262 people (29.0%) who were 65 years of age or older. The median age was 53.2 years. For every 100 females, there were 97.2 males.

There were 457 housing units at an average density of 144.0 units per square mile (55.6 units/km^{2}), of which 399 (87.3%) were occupied. Of these, 295 (73.9%) were owner-occupied, and 104 (26.1%) were occupied by renters.

== Politics ==
In the state legislature, Rough and Ready is in the 1st senatorial district, represented by Republican Megan Dahle, and the 1st Assembly district, represented by Republican Heather Hadwick.

Federally, Rough and Ready is in California's 3rd congressional district, represented by Independent Kevin Kiley.

== Education ==
It is in the Penn Valley Union Elementary School District and the Nevada Joint Union High School District.

== In popular culture ==
- The song and music video titled "Rough and Ready" was released in August 2025 by Bill Paulsen. It tells the true story of Rough and Ready founder Absalom Townsend and the founding of the town in 1849.
- The New York City-based music duo The Great Republic of Rough and Ready takes its name from the town.
- The television series Death Valley Days told the story of Rough and Ready in two different episodes.
- The Ruins of Rough and Ready, a "comical western" novel by Clark Casey, "reimagines the three months when Rough and Ready was a sovereign republic". The town drunkard falls asleep in a cave and wakes up in an earthquake to find a giant gold boulder, which must be brought to Sacramento while every bandit in California is closing in. The town is defended by "oddball miners" and "a sheriff who's afraid of guns".
- The Sacramento-based math rock band Hella released a track entitled "Republic of Rough and Ready" on their 2002 album Hold Your Horse Is. Notably, guitarist Spencer Seim was born and raised in Nevada County, with drummer Zach Hill briefly living there as well.

== See also ==
- History of California
- Republic of Indian Stream
- California Historical Landmarks in Nevada County
