= California Interscholastic Federation =

Governing body for high-school sports in California, US

- Abbreviation: CIF
- Formation: 1914
- Type: NPO
- Legal status: Association
- Purpose: Athletic/Educational
- Headquarters: 4658 Duckhorn Drive; Sacramento, CA 95834
- Region served: California
- Members: 1,615 member schools (2023–24)
- Executive Director: Ronald W. Nocetti
- Affiliations: National Federation of State High School Associations
- Staff: 10
- Website: cifstate.org

The California Interscholastic Federation (CIF) is the governing body for high school sports in the U.S. state of California. CIF membership includes both public and private high schools. Unlike most other state organizations, it does not have single, statewide championships for all sports; instead, for some sports, the CIF's 10 Sections each have their own championships.

Six schools near the state border are members of adjacent state's associations. San Pasqual Valley High School is part of the Arizona Interscholastic Association. Coleville High School, Needles High School, North Tahoe High School, South Tahoe High School and Truckee High School are part of the Nevada Interscholastic Activities Association.

In December 2025, the California Department of Education issued a mandatory order directing the Tahoe Truckee Unified School District to move the athletic programs of Truckee High School and North Tahoe High School from the NIAA to the CIF, citing a conflict between NIAA eligibility rules and California anti-discrimination law. The district stated it would become a legal CIF member effective July 1, 2026, while continuing to compete in the NIAA through the 2027–28 school year for scheduling reasons before joining CIF's Sac-Joaquin Section. The order could also extend to South Tahoe, Needles, and Coleville High Schools, which were not yet part of the mandate as of December 2025.

== History ==
As early as 1891, schools around the San Francisco Bay Area began competing against each other in football organized by the Amateur Academic Athletic Association. Other boys sports were added starting in 1894, organized by the Academic Athletic League. While teams represented the schools by name, there was no affiliation with the school administration.

The CIF was founded in Los Angeles in 1914 by a group of area school principals. It was founded in order to standardize rules and team structures between schools; it was also intended to prevent abuses such as "school shopping" by athletes and teams fielding players over high school age. Other school principals voluntarily entered into the program, and by 1917, the organization was established statewide.

In 2005, CIF began requiring that all student athletes sign a pledge not to take any steroids or face suspension or expulsion. This action was the first of its kind from a statewide high school athletics association in the United States.

== Championships ==
CIF holds state and regional championships in:

- Badminton
- Boys' and Girls' Basketball; California high school basketball championship
- Boys' and Girls' Tennis
- Boys' and Girls' Cross Country
- Football; List of California state high school football champions
- Boys' and Girls' Golf
- Boys' and Girls' Swimming and Diving
- Boys' and Girls' Soccer
- Boys' and Girls' Track and Field; the CIF California State Meet
- Boys' and Girls' Tennis
- Boys' and Girls' Volleyball
- Boys' and Girls' Water Polo
- Boys' and Girls' Wrestling

CIF also hosts a state cheerleading championship in conjunction with the football championship.

Individual CIF sections also conduct championships in other sports, including:

- Field hockey
- Boys' and Girls' Lacrosse
- Roller Hockey

In sports where a school has separate boys' and girls' teams, girls are not allowed on boys' teams, and boys are not allowed on girls' teams. (In sports such as baseball that do not have girls' teams, girls are allowed to play; on the other hand, in sports such as softball that do not have boys' teams, in most cases boys are not allowed to play.)

== Participants ==
In the 2023–24 season, 806,979 student-athletes competed in CIF member schools, a 5.6 percent increase over the previous year. Girls' participation rose 7.4 percent year-over-year, while boys' participation rose 4.3 percent.

The most popular sports for girls were soccer, with 47,631 participants; volleyball, with 46,851; track and field, with 44,774; softball, with 29,930; and basketball, with 28,950.

The most popular sports for boys were 11-player football, with 89,667 participants; track and field, with 57,088; soccer, with 56,124; basketball, with 46,883; and baseball, with 43,015.

== Awards ==
CIF offers various awards to its participants:

- Academic State Champions, given to the teams with high academic achievement
- Model Coach Award, for coaches who are positive role models
- Scholar-Athlete of the Year, based on academic and athletic excellence, and character
- Spirit of Sport, based on sportsmanship, community service, and leadership

== Administration ==
=== Sections ===
The state is broken up into ten administrative sections. These sections are:

Section #	Section	Region	Location	Website	# of Schools
1	Northern Section	Northern	Inland, north California (NE corner of state)	cifns.org	69
2	North Coast Section	Northern	Coastal regions of northern California (Alameda County, Contra Costa County, Marin County, Sonoma County, Lake County, Solano County, Napa County, Mendocino County, Humboldt County, Del Norte County)	cifncs.org	175
3	Sac-Joaquin Section	Northern	Northern San Joaquin Valley (east from Bay Area to Lake Tahoe)	www.cifsjs.org	201
4	San Francisco Section	Northern	San Francisco Unified School District	www.cifsf.org	17
5	Oakland Section	Northern	Oakland Unified School District	www.cifoakland.org	31
6	Central Coast Section	Northern	Middle, coast region of state Monterey County, San Benito County, San Mateo County, Santa Clara County, Santa Cruz County	cifccs.org	156
7	Central Section	Southern	Central and southern San Joaquin Valley, San Luis Obispo County, Inyo County, Mono County	www.cifcs.org	141
8	Los Angeles City Section	Southern	Los Angeles Unified School District (City of Los Angeles and surrounding areas)	www.cif-la.org	156
9	Southern Section	Southern	Southern California (Los Angeles, Orange, Riverside, San Bernardino, Ventura and Santa Barbara Counties), except LAUSD schools and very southern part of the State.	www.cifss.org	559
10	San Diego Section	Southern	San Diego and Imperial Counties (southernmost part of California).	www.cifsds.org	127

Each section except for San Francisco and Oakland is further subdivided into leagues. The Northern Section is divided into three conferences which in turn are divided into leagues.

The Southern Section is the largest by both membership and geography, covering just under one-third of the state's total area and almost half of the population base. The Southern section includes private schools in the LAUSD service area, whether inside or outside the city of Los Angeles, and the Central Coast and North Coast sections also include private schools in the cities of San Francisco and Oakland respectively. The three "City Sections" are operated by and were historically limited to the corresponding public school systems. With the advent of charter schools in California, all three City Sections include both traditional public schools and charter schools operating within the historic boundaries of the respective public school systems. The San Francisco Section now includes one private school as well.

The sections also serve as the qualifying entities for regional and state competitions, and may organize championships in sports not contested statewide, such as badminton, baseball, field hockey, gymnastics, lacrosse, skiing and snowboarding, soccer, softball, and water polo.

=== Federated Council ===
The organization's supreme governing body is the Federated Council. This council consists of one representative from each section, a representative from the California Department of Education, representatives from all bodies recognized as Allied Organizations by the CIF, the Council President, the President-Elect, and the immediate past President. Each representative is elected to a term of two years. The Council meets three times per year.

=== Allied organizations ===
The following groups are considered Allied Organization by CIF:

- California Department of Education
- California School Boards Association (CSBA)
- National Federation of State High School Associations (NFHS)
- Association of California School Administrators (ACSA)
- California State Athletic Directors Association (CSADA)
- California Association for Health, Physical Education, Recreation and Dance (CAHPERD)
- California Coaches Association
- Josephson Institute "Character Counts!"
- Positive Coaching Alliance
- Center for Sports Parenting

== See also ==
- NFHS
