= Lake of the Pines, California =

Lake of the Pines
- census-designated place
- Location in Nevada County and the state of California

- Location in the United States
- Coordinates: 39°2′19″N 121°3′41″W
- Country: United States
- State: California
- County: Nevada

Area
  - Total: 2.878 sq mi (7.454 km^{2})
  - Land: 2.527 sq mi (6.545 km^{2})
  - Water: 0.351 sq mi (0.909 km^{2}) 12.20%
- Elevation: 1,516 ft (462 m)

Population (2020)
  - Total: 4,301
  - Density: 1,702/sq mi (657.1/km^{2})
- Time zone: UTC-8 (Pacific (PST))
  - Summer (DST): UTC-7 (PDT)
- ZIP code: 95602
- Area code: 530
- FIPS code: 06-39690
- GNIS feature ID: 1682905

Lake of the Pines is a census-designated place (CDP) and a gated residential community in Nevada County, California, United States. The population was 4,301 at the 2020 census.

== History ==
Lake of the Pines was laid out by property developers in the 1960s.

== Geography ==
Lake of the Pines is located in the foothills of the Sierra Nevada mountain range in California, at 39°02′19″N 121°03′41″W.

According to the United States Census Bureau, the CDP has a total area of 2.9 square miles (7.5 km^{2}), of which, 2.5 square miles (6.5 km^{2}) of it is land and 0.4 square miles (1.0 km^{2}) of it (12.20%) is water.

Lake of the Pines is commonly associated with a gated residential community which surrounds a reservoir, also named Lake of the Pines. The reservoir was created by damming Magnolia Creek, in the Bear River watershed, and it has a maximum elevation of 459 m (1507 ft). The gated community contains a golf course looping around the reservoir. The community is normally accessed only through the main entrance from Magnolia Road, just northeast of Combie Road.

The boundaries of the census-designated place differ slightly from the boundaries of the gated community. As the CDP boundaries tend to follow streets, the CDP excludes many parcels in the periphery of the gated community and includes a shopping center in Combie Road. In postal addresses, the area is considered a part of Auburn, though the city of Auburn is in Placer County.

== Demographics ==
Historical population
Census	Pop.	Note	%±
1990	3,890		—
2000	3,956		1.7%
2010	3,917		−1.0%
2020	4,301		9.8%
U.S. Decennial Census; 1990 2000 2010

Lake of the Pines first appeared as a census designated place in the 1990 U.S. census.

=== 2020 census ===
As of the 2020 census, Lake of the Pines had a population of 4,301. The population density was 1,702.0 inhabitants per square mile (657.1/km^{2}).

The age distribution was 15.1% under the age of 18, 5.8% aged 18 to 24, 14.6% aged 25 to 44, 31.0% aged 45 to 64, and 33.6% aged 65 or older. The median age was 56.9 years. For every 100 females, there were 90.1 males, and for every 100 females age 18 and over there were 87.7 males age 18 and over.

99.1% of residents lived in urban areas, while 0.9% lived in rural areas.

The whole population lived in households. There were 1,825 households, of which 18.6% had children under the age of 18 living in them. Of all households, 60.9% were married-couple households, 3.9% were cohabiting couple households, 23.5% had a female householder with no spouse or partner present, and 11.7% had a male householder with no spouse or partner present. About 24.1% of households were one person, and 16.0% were one person aged 65 or older. The average household size was 2.36. There were 1,305 families (71.5% of all households).

There were 2,044 housing units at an average density of 808.9 units per square mile (312.3 units/km^{2}), of which 1,825 (89.3%) were occupied and 219 (10.7%) were vacant. Of occupied units, 84.6% were owner-occupied and 15.4% were renter-occupied. The homeowner vacancy rate was 2.0% and the rental vacancy rate was 7.2%.

Racial composition as of the 2020 census
Race	Number	Percent
White	3,727	86.7%
Black or African American	13	0.3%
American Indian and Alaska Native	39	0.9%
Asian	65	1.5%
Native Hawaiian and Other Pacific Islander	15	0.3%
Some other race	58	1.3%
Two or more races	384	8.9%
Hispanic or Latino (of any race)	387	9.0%

=== Demographic estimates ===
In 2023, the US Census Bureau estimated that 2.5% of the population were foreign-born. Of all people aged 5 or older, 97.6% spoke only English at home, 0.3% spoke Spanish, 1.7% spoke other Indo-European languages, and 0.4% spoke Asian or Pacific Islander languages. Of those aged 25 or older, 97.9% were high school graduates and 40.5% had a bachelor's degree.

=== Income and poverty ===
The median household income in 2023 was $118,661, and the per capita income was $63,253. About 3.1% of families and 8.0% of the population were below the poverty line.

=== 2010 census ===
At the 2010 census Lake of the Pines had a population of 3,917. The population density was 2,122.1 inhabitants per square mile (819.3/km^{2}). The racial makeup of Lake of the Pines was 3,669 (93.7%) White, 5 (0.1%) African American, 20 (0.5%) Native American, 65 (1.7%) Asian, 7 (0.2%) Pacific Islander, 24 (0.6%) from other races, and 127 (3.2%) from two or more races. Hispanic or Latino of any race were 246 people (6.3%).

The census reported that 3,917 people lived in households, no one lived in non-institutionalized group quarters and no one was institutionalized.

There were 1,567 households, 478 (30.5%) had children under the age of 18 living in them, 977 (62.3%) were opposite-sex married couples living together, 157 (10.0%) had a female householder with no husband present, 62 (4.0%) had a male householder with no wife present. There were 54 (3.4%) unmarried opposite-sex partnerships, and 15 (1.0%) same-sex married couples or partnerships. 314 households (20.0%) were one person and 197 (12.6%) had someone living alone who was 65 or older. The average household size was 2.50. There were 1,196 families (76.3% of households); the average family size was 2.84.

The age distribution was 871 people (22.2%) under the age of 18, 221 people (5.6%) aged 18 to 24, 594 people (15.2%) aged 25 to 44, 1,276 people (32.6%) aged 45 to 64, and 955 people (24.4%) who were 65 or older. The median age was 49.5 years. For every 100 females, there were 90.4 males. For every 100 females age 18 and over, there were 87.2 males.

There were 1,768 housing units at an average density of 957.8 per square mile, of the occupied units 1,234 (78.7%) were owner-occupied and 333 (21.3%) were rented. The homeowner vacancy rate was 3.2%; the rental vacancy rate was 2.3%. 2,932 people (74.9% of the population) lived in owner-occupied housing units and 985 people (25.1%) lived in rental housing units.

== Politics ==
In the state legislature, Lake of the Pines is in the 1st senatorial district, represented by Republican Megan Dahle, and the 1st Assembly district, represented by Republican Heather Hadwick.

Federally, Lake of the Pines is in California's 3rd congressional district, represented by Independent Kevin Kiley.

== Education ==
It is in the Pleasant Ridge Union Elementary School District and the Nevada Joint Union High School District.
