= Grass Valley Charter School =

Location
- 225 South Auburn St. Grass Valley, California 95945; United States; 39.215240°N 121.061211°W

Information
- School type: public charter school
- Opened: 1993
- School district: Grass Valley School District
- Principal: Luke Duchene
- Grades: TK–8
- Enrollment: 517 (2018–19)
- Website: charter.gvsd.us

Grass Valley Charter School is a K–8 charter school in Grass Valley, California, USA, part of Grass Valley School District. It was the first charter school in that part of Nevada County.

== School ==
Grass Valley Charter School had an enrollment of 517 in the 2018–19 school year. The principal is Luke Duchene.

The school uses expeditionary learning and was a mentor school for the approach in 2011–12. Student schedules combine five-day-a-week classes and independent study. The school was founded to appeal to families who were home schooling, and has a parallel program for home-schooled students.

== History ==
The school opened in 1993, the first charter school in the area. It initially had 115 students and was housed in modular classrooms on the campus of Hennessy School. By 2005 enrollment was 211 and the school was moved to the former Bell Hill School. As enrollment continued to grow, middle school and home study students were moved back to the Hennessy campus in 2011–12 and the following school year, after the closure of Hennessy and with an enrollment of 448, the remainder of the school moved there. During that year enrollment reached 450, 70 of whom were home-study students.

The Grass Valley Charter School Foundation holds an annual family festival, the Blue Marble Jubilee, as a fundraiser. The 2019 event was canceled as a precaution after internet conspiracy theorists associated with the QAnon theory interpreted the first letters in a list of past jobs posted on Twitter by former FBI head James Comey, GVCSF, as a veiled reference to the foundation suggesting that Comey planned to stage a "false flag" terror attack at the event. The school, the local police, and the FBI all received warnings, and the school decided not to take the risk of vigilantes attending "to guard the place", as a police sergeant put it.
