= GVSD =

GVSD may refer to:

- Garnet Valley School District, a public school district in Delaware County, Pennsylvania, USA
- Grass Valley School District, a public school district in Nevada County, California, USA
- Great Valley School District, a public school district in Chester County, Pennsylvania, USA
- Gun Violence Suppression Division, of the New York City Police Department Detective Bureau, NYC, NYS, USA
