= Graniteville, California =

Unincorporated community in California, United States

Graniteville
- census-designated place & unincorporated community
- Location of Graniteville in Nevada County, California.

- Location of Graniteville in California
- Coordinates: 39°26′27″N 120°44′23″W
- Country: United States
- State: California
- County: Nevada

Area
  - Total: 1.488 sq mi (3.853 km^{2})
  - Land: 1.488 sq mi (3.853 km^{2})
  - Water: 0 sq mi (0 km^{2}) 0%
- Elevation: 4,977 ft (1,517 m)

Population (2020)
  - Total: 1
  - Density: 0.67/sq mi (0.26/km^{2})
- Time zone: UTC-8 (Pacific (PST))
  - Summer (DST): UTC-7 (PDT)
- ZIP code: 95959
- Area code: 530
- FIPS code: 06-06057

Graniteville (previously: Eureka and unofficially Eureka South) is a small, unincorporated community and census-designated place (CDP) located in Nevada County, California, United States. The town sits on the San Juan ridge separating the Middle and South Forks of the Yuba River, approximately 26 miles (42 km) northeast of Nevada City. The elevation of Graniteville is 4,977 feet (1,517 m) above sea level. As of the 2020 census, the population was just one, down from eleven in the 2010 census.

== History ==
First settled in 1850, it was the original town in Eureka Township and an early gold mining center for Nevada County. As was popular at the time, the town was named Eureka, the state motto ("I have found it"), in honor of California's admission in September 1850, to the Union. Many other early Nevada County sites carried the Eureka name, including Eureka Hill, Eureka Mine, Eureka School District, Eureka Heights Residential District in Grass Valley, and Eureka House, an early tavern and inn built in 1850–1851.

Due to its proximity to another town of Eureka in Sierra County, however, as early as the 1850s it was often referred to as Eureka South to avoid confusion. In 1857, Goddard's Map recorded the town as Eureka South. When a United States Post Office was established on August 26, 1867, the town's name officially became Graniteville, because there already was a Eureka post office in Humboldt County. However locals and historians continued to call it Eureka for some time.

Graniteville was the first settled town in Eureka Township, situated on Poorman Creek between the Middle and South Yuba Rivers. By the mid 1850s, Eureka had a winter population of about 1000 residents, although dry season population often dropped to about 200 individuals due to poor water supply. As in many similar early mining towns, early Eureka was a raucous environment, populated mostly by men and used to settling disputes with violence. For example, in January 1854, a riot erupted between Irish and English miners over priority to a claim. Shots were exchanged and a woman passer-by was wounded. The involved parties were arrested and five individuals were fined $60.00 each, a substantial sum at the time. In spite of its somewhat unruly beginnings, the town established stores, hotels, a livery stable, saloons, a bakery and a brewery. By 1855, there were enough local children to warrant a school. By the 1870s, a Catholic church had been established.

Eureka was a stage line terminus and the last local town for outfitting miners for the higher elevations, along with being an important distribution point for reservoir waters that were fed via ditches to the lower hydraulic mines. It was connected to the world's first long distance telephone line, established in 1878 to link the mining communities around the San Juan Ridge. It was also an important stop on the Henness Pass road connecting Marysville and Nevada County with what was to become Nevada. Establishment of a United States Post Office in 1867 allowed for tri-weekly mail delivery by stage from Nevada City when weather allowed. When inclement weather prohibited stage delivery, foot express delivery from Moore's Flat, about 6 miles west, was periodically feasible. As of 1867, Eureka was one of the few Nevada County towns that had not suffered from disastrous fires. On August 12, 1878, however, fire destroyed much of the original town, at a loss of $50,000.00. By then, under the name of Graniteville, the town partially had come back to life, and by 1880 there was a population of around 300.

== Mining ==
Gold mining started in 1850 around Eureka, with the diggings opening in 1851. During the early years, little capital was needed to begin mining activity, as gold was easily found. "Restless, roving prospectors" were able to find surface gold with little effort in the rivers and ravines. During the early 1850s, numerous ditches for water transport were dug, one of the largest being the 30-mile long "Memphis Race." Started in 1853 by Dr. James Weaver, and constructed over several years, it was built to take water from the Middle Yuba to the town. Due to poor and short-sighted mining practices, however, and the fact that early miners wanted quick access to the gold, placer mining around Eureka was nearly played out within a few years, businesses closed, and the town struggled. By about 1856, Eureka was in decline, with a greatly reduced population.

Some quartz veins were discovered in the early and mid 1850s, but this initial quartz mining momentum did not last. In spite of building some solid mines and stamp mills around Eureka, the endeavors were not long-lasting. A secondary effort at quartz mining, however, rejuvenated the region by about 1867. An influx of new miners revived the severely decreasing population, which by early 1866 had dropped to 20 residents. In May 1866, Eureka's population was hovering around 400, with it remaining stable at about 350 for several years, due to mining success.

The most extensive quartz mining in the region was done on the gravel range along the flats, partially worked by hydraulic mining. The Eureka Quartz District was similar in ledge size and formation to those in the Nevada District and equally successful. Some of the most profitable quartz ledges near Eureka included the Jim, the Liberty, the Birchville, the Veatch and Powell, the Dillon and Russel, the Black and Young, the Mohawk, the Booth, and the Eclipse. One of the largest mines was the Boston Mine, owned by the Eureka Lake and Yuba Land Company, and formed by the consolidation of several earlier, smaller claims.

Hydraulic mining continued until it was largely shut down by the 1884 Sawyer decision, which banned the discharge of tailings (gravel which had been stripped of its gold) into the Yuba River, of which Poorman Creek was a tributary.

== Eureka Township ==
Eureka Township was an early civil township located in the northern portion of Nevada County, with borders extending to the summit of the Sierra Nevada mountains. Aside from Eureka, other early towns in the township included Moore's Flat, Orlean's Flat, Woolsey's Flat and South Fork. Eureka Township functioned as an organized political body during the formative mining years, as noted by the fact that in 1867, several local men filled positions as justices and constables for the township.

== Graniteville in the 20th and 21st centuries ==
While mining was greatly diminished by the start of the 20th century, some activity surfaced again in the 1930s and briefly in the mid-to-late 1940s after World War II. In 1924, Graniteville still had an active school district and the Graniteville Post Office functioned until it was discontinued in 1959. The Golden Hotel served as Graniteville's "center of social and business life" for 50 years until it burned down in 1948. Established in 1855, Graniteville Cemetery continues to function as an active cemetery. It is located about ¼ miles south of the town and can be reached via the graveled N. Bloomfield-Graniteville Road. The paved roads end miles before Granitevlle, and the roads are not snowplowed in winter. As of 2017, Graniteville still is inhabited. In 2010, the population was shown as 11 residents. Due to the fact that some residents are weekend and/or summer-time residents only, the actual population figure shifts regularly. Their existence is a hardy one, reminiscent in many ways of the town's pioneer days. There are no commercial establishments, but there is a volunteer fire department.

== Politics ==
In the state legislature, Graniteville is in the 1st senatorial district, represented by Republican Megan Dahle, and the 1st Assembly district, represented by Republican Heather Hadwick.

Federally, Graniteville is in California's 3rd congressional district, represented by Kevin Kiley.

== Education ==
It is in the Twin Ridges Elementary School District and the Nevada Joint Union High School District.

== Demographics ==
Historical population
Census	Pop.	Note	%±
2010	11		—
2020	1		−90.9%
U.S. Decennial Census; 2000 2010

Graniteville first appeared as a census designated place in the 2010 U.S. census.
