= Alta Sierra, California =

Census-designated place in Nevada County, California, U.S.

Alta Sierra
- census-designated place
- Location in Nevada County and the state of California

- Location in the United States
- Coordinates: 39°7′44″N 121°3′9″W
- Country: United States
- State: California
- County: Nevada

Area
  - Total: 8.34 sq mi (21.60 km^{2})
  - Land: 8.32 sq mi (21.55 km^{2})
  - Water: 0.019 sq mi (0.05 km^{2}) 0.25%
- Elevation: 2,310 ft (704 m)

Population (2020)
  - Total: 7,204
  - Density: 865.8/sq mi (334.27/km^{2})
- Time zone: UTC-8 (Pacific (PST))
  - Summer (DST): UTC-7 (PDT)
- ZIP code: 95949
- Area codes: 530, 837
- FIPS code: 06-01360
- GNIS feature ID: 1682830

Alta Sierra (Spanish for "Upper Range") is a census-designated place (CDP) in Nevada County, California, United States. The population was 7,204 at the 2020 census.

== History ==
Alta Sierra was laid out by property developers in the 1960s. Alta Sierra is a golf course community, with homes built around the Alta Sierra Country Club, a semi-private 18 hole course built in 1964. The community has a member-owned airport with a 2800-foot runway. The community is located just east of California State Highway 49, at an elevation of approximately 2300 feet, between the cities of Grass Valley, California to the north and Auburn, California to the south. There is a small commercial district with several restaurants, a gas station, a market and personal service businesses. There is also an elementary school and a motel.

== Geography ==
Alta Sierra is located at 39°7′44″N 121°3′9″W (39.128952, -121.052442).

According to the United States Census Bureau, the CDP has a total area of 8.3 square miles (21 km^{2}), of which, 8.3 square miles (21 km^{2}) of it is land and 0.02 square miles (0.052 km^{2}) of it (0.25%) is water.

There is also another community called Alta Sierra in northcentral Kern County, CA near Lake Isabella.

=== Climate ===
Climate data for Alta Sierra, California
Month	Jan	Feb	Mar	Apr	May	Jun	Jul	Aug	Sep	Oct	Nov	Dec	Year
Mean daily maximum °F (°C)	53 (12)	56 (13)	59 (15)	65 (18)	73 (23)	82 (28)	89 (32)	89 (32)	83 (28)	73 (23)	60 (16)	52 (11)	70 (21)
Mean daily minimum °F (°C)	34 (1)	35 (2)	38 (3)	41 (5)	47 (8)	53 (12)	58 (14)	57 (14)	52 (11)	45 (7)	38 (3)	34 (1)	44 (7)
Average precipitation inches (mm)	9.0 (230)	8.9 (230)	8.5 (220)	4.1 (100)	2.4 (61)	.7 (18)	0 (0)	.2 (5.1)	.9 (23)	2.9 (74)	6.9 (180)	10.3 (260)	54.8 (1,401.1)
Average snowfall inches (cm)	1.1 (2.8)	2.7 (6.9)	2.3 (5.8)	.3 (0.76)	0 (0)	0 (0)	0 (0)	0 (0)	0 (0)	0 (0)	.3 (0.76)	1.4 (3.6)	8.1 (20.62)

== Demographics ==
Historical population
Census	Pop.	Note	%±
1980	2,168		—
1990	5,709		163.3%
2000	6,522		14.2%
2010	6,911		6.0%
2020	7,204		4.2%
U.S. Decennial Census; 1850–1870 1880-1890; 1900 1910 1920; 1930 1940 1950; 1960 1970 1980; 1990 2000 2010

Alta Sierra first appeared as a census-designated place in the 1980 United States census.

The 2020 United States census reported that Alta Sierra had a population of 7,204. The population density was 865.8 inhabitants per square mile (334.3/km^{2}). The racial makeup of Alta Sierra was 85.4% White, 0.3% African American, 1.2% Native American, 1.3% Asian, 0.3% Pacific Islander, 1.7% from other races, and 9.7% from two or more races. Hispanic or Latino of any race were 8.0% of the population.

The census reported that 100.0% of the population lived in households and 1 person (0.0%) was institutionalized.

There were 2,947 households, out of which 25.0% included children under the age of 18, 59.2% were married-couple households, 7.2% were cohabiting couple households, 21.1% had a female householder with no partner present, and 12.5% had a male householder with no partner present. 20.5% of households were one person, and 12.5% were one person aged 65 or older. The average household size was 2.44. There were 2,161 families (73.3% of all households).

The age distribution was 19.3% under the age of 18, 4.7% aged 18 to 24, 20.1% aged 25 to 44, 26.5% aged 45 to 64, and 29.3% who were 65 years of age or older. The median age was 50.7 years. For every 100 females, there were 91.5 males.

There were 3,065 housing units at an average density of 368.3 units per square mile (142.2 units/km^{2}), of which 2,947 (96.2%) were occupied. Of these, 85.6% were owner-occupied, and 14.4% were occupied by renters.

In 2023, the US Census Bureau estimated that 3.3% of the population were foreign-born. Of all people aged 5 or older, 95.6% spoke only English at home, 2.7% spoke Spanish, 0.6% spoke other Indo-European languages, 0.1% spoke Asian or Pacific Islander languages, and 1.0% spoke other languages. Of those aged 25 or older, 96.5% were high school graduates and 42.0% had a bachelor's degree.

The median household income was $99,576, and the per capita income was $49,657. About 3.3% of families and 5.7% of the population were below the poverty line.

== Politics ==
In the state legislature, Alta Sierra is in the 1st senatorial district, represented by Republican Megan Dahle, and the 1st Assembly district, represented by Republican Heather Hadwick.

Federally, Alta Sierra is in California's 3rd congressional district, represented by Independent Kevin Kiley.

== Education ==
Most of the CDP is in the Pleasant Ridge Union Elementary School District while a portion is in the Grass Valley Elementary School District. All of it is in the Nevada Joint Union High School District.
