= Tahoe-Truckee Unified School District =

School district in California

Tahoe Truckee Unified School District

Address
- 11603 Donner Pass Road Truckee, California, 96161; United States

District information
- Type: Public
- Grades: TK–12
- Superintendent: Ms. Kerstin Kramer
- NCES District ID: 0638770

Students and staff
- Students: 3,965 (2020–2021)
- Teachers: 197.02 (FTE)
- Staff: 359.98 (FTE)
- Student–teacher ratio: 20.12:1

Other information
- Website: www.ttusd.org

Tahoe Truckee Unified School District is a unified school district based in Truckee, California that educates students in the Truckee and northern Lake Tahoe areas. The district area encompasses 723 square miles, serving Placer County, Nevada County, and El Dorado County.

The district has five elementary schools, one district-sponsored K-8 charter school, two middle schools, and two comprehensive high schools (North Tahoe High School and Truckee High School), as well as two alternative schools.

The district is a basic aid revenue limit district, funded by local property taxes as supposed to the state funding formula.

Due to its geographic location, Truckee and North Tahoe compete in the Nevada Interscholastic Activities Association.

== Boundary ==
Within Placer County, the district includes Carnelian Bay, Cedar Flat, Dollar Point, Kings Beach, Sunnyside-Tahoe City, and Tahoe Vista, as well as that county's portion of Tahoma. The remainder of Tahoma, in El Dorado County, is also in this district.

Within Nevada County, the district includes Truckee, Floriston, Kingvale, and Soda Springs.

== Schools ==
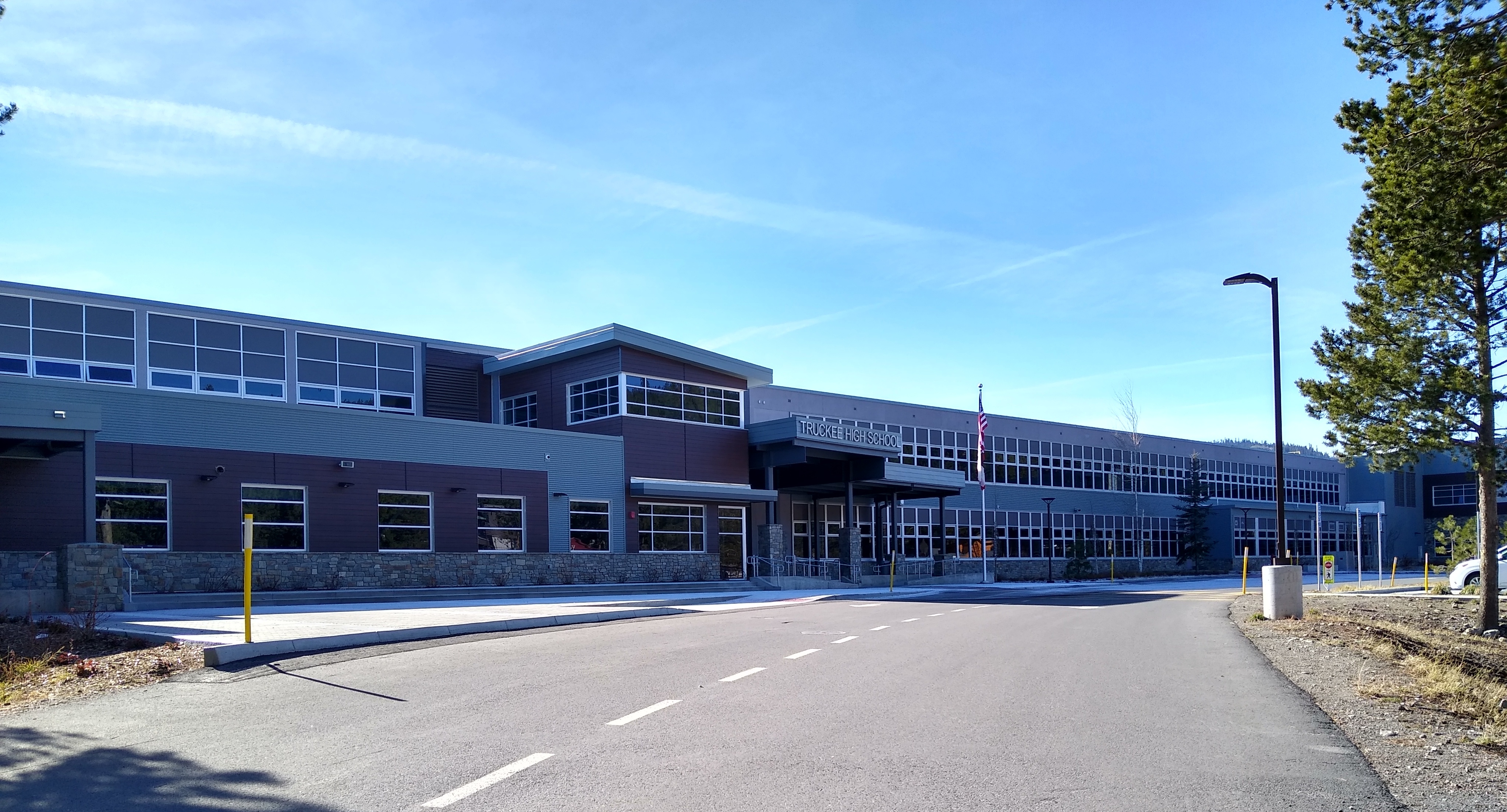
Truckee High School

Within the Tahoe Truckee Unified School District, there are a total of 12 schools:

Elementary Schools:

- Truckee Elementary School (TK-5)
- Glenshire Elementary School (TK-5)
- Donner Trail Elementary School (K-5)
- Kings Beach Elementary School (TK-5)
- Tahoe Lake Elementary School (TK-5)
- Sierra Expeditionary Learning School (charter) (K-8)

Middle Schools:

- Alder Creek Middle School (6-8)
- North Tahoe Middle School (6-8)

High Schools:

- Truckee High School (9-12)
- North Tahoe High School (9-12)

Alternative Schools:

- Sierra Continuation High School (9-12)
- Cold Stream Alternative (6-12)
