= Kingvale, California =

- census-designated place
- Location of Kingvale in Nevada County and Placer County, California.

- Location in California
- Coordinates: 39°19′13″N 120°26′19″W
- Country: United States
- State: California
- Counties: Nevada, Placer

Area
  - Total: 0.970 sq mi (2.512 km^{2})
  - Land: 0.961 sq mi (2.490 km^{2})
  - Water: 0.0085 sq mi (0.022 km^{2}) 0.88%
- Elevation: 6,106 ft (1,861 m)

Population (2020)
  - Total: 128
  - Density: 133/sq mi (51.4/km^{2})
- Time zone: UTC-8 (Pacific (PST))
  - Summer (DST): UTC-7 (PDT)
- FIPS code: 06-38604
- GNIS feature ID: 2628744

Kingvale is a census-designated place (CDP) in Placer County and Nevada County, California, United States. The CDP straddles the border of the two counties, with Nevada County to the north and Placer County to the south. It is located near Soda Springs, 5.5 mi (8.9 km) west of Donner Pass. Kingvale was listed on an official map as of 1955. The population was 128 at the 2020 census.

== Geography ==
According to the United States Census Bureau, the CDP covers an area of 1.0 square miles (2.5 km^{2}), 99.12% of it land, and 0.88% of it water.

== Demographics ==
Historical population
Census	Pop.	Note	%±
2010	143		—
2020	128		−10.5%
U.S. Decennial Census; 2000 2010

Kingvale first appeared as a census designated place in the 2010 U.S. census.

The 2020 United States census reported that Kingvale had a population of 128. The population density was 133.1 inhabitants per square mile (51.4/km^{2}). The racial makeup of Kingvale was 122 (95.3%) White, 0 (0.0%) African American, 0 (0.0%) Native American, 1 (0.8%) Asian, 0 (0.0%) Pacific Islander, 0 (0.0%) from other races, and 5 (3.9%) from two or more races. Hispanic or Latino of any race were 2 persons (1.6%).

The whole population lived in households. There were 67 households, out of which 8 (11.9%) had children under the age of 18 living in them, 24 (35.8%) were married-couple households, 7 (10.4%) were cohabiting couple households, 8 (11.9%) had a female householder with no partner present, and 28 (41.8%) had a male householder with no partner present. 22 households (32.8%) were one person, and 9 (13.4%) were one person aged 65 or older. The average household size was 1.91. There were 32 families (47.8% of all households).

The age distribution was 23 people (18.0%) under the age of 18, 5 people (3.9%) aged 18 to 24, 33 people (25.8%) aged 25 to 44, 45 people (35.2%) aged 45 to 64, and 22 people (17.2%) who were 65 years of age or older. The median age was 48.0 years. There were 77 males and 51 females.

There were 314 housing units at an average density of 326.4 units per square mile (126.0 units/km^{2}), of which 67 (21.3%) were occupied. Of these, 39 (58.2%) were owner-occupied, and 28 (41.8%) were occupied by renters.

== Education ==
It is in the Tahoe-Truckee Unified School District.
