= Truckee High School =

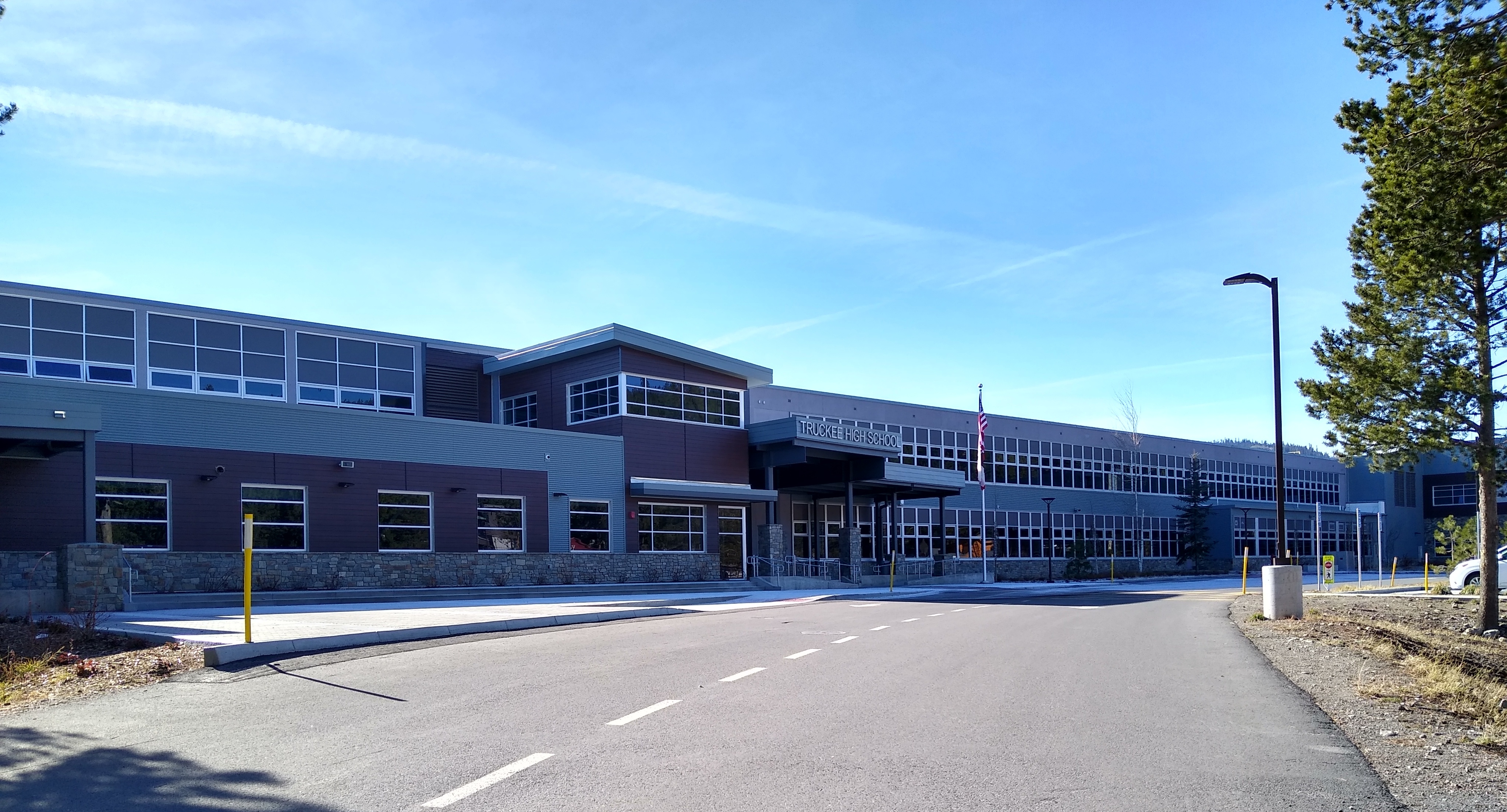

Location
- 11725 Donner Pass Rd; Truckee, Nevada County, California, 96161; United States
- Coordinates: 39.32475°N 120.21637°W

Information
- Type: Public Secondary
- Established: 1951
- School district: Tahoe-Truckee Unified School District
- Principal: John Neuberger
- Grades: 9th – 12th
- Enrollment: 852 (2023-2024) https://www.ttusd.org/domain/96
- Colors: Silver, Scarlet, and White
- Mascot: Wolverine
- Rival: North Tahoe
- Website: Main page

Truckee High School is one of two high schools in the Tahoe-Truckee Unified School District. The district is based in the Lake Tahoe area town of Truckee in eastern Nevada County, California.

== History ==
During the 1940s, plans were made to build a school to serve the Lake Tahoe, Truckee and Donner Lake areas of California. The Tahoe-Truckee Unified School District purchased a US$2,000 site next to U.S. Highway 40 (now Interstate 80), choosing Gordon Stafford as the building's architect in April 1949. Construction of the school began in June 1950 under Mervin Gardner Company of Reno, Nevada.

In September 1951, the Tahoe-Truckee High School officially opened. Delayed construction on the building led to the school opening two weeks late, with only three classrooms being completed at the time.

During the early 1970s, plans were announced by the school district to create a new high school in the North Tahoe-Truckee area, naming it North Tahoe High School. It opened in 1974.
