= Floriston, California =

Floriston
- census-designated place
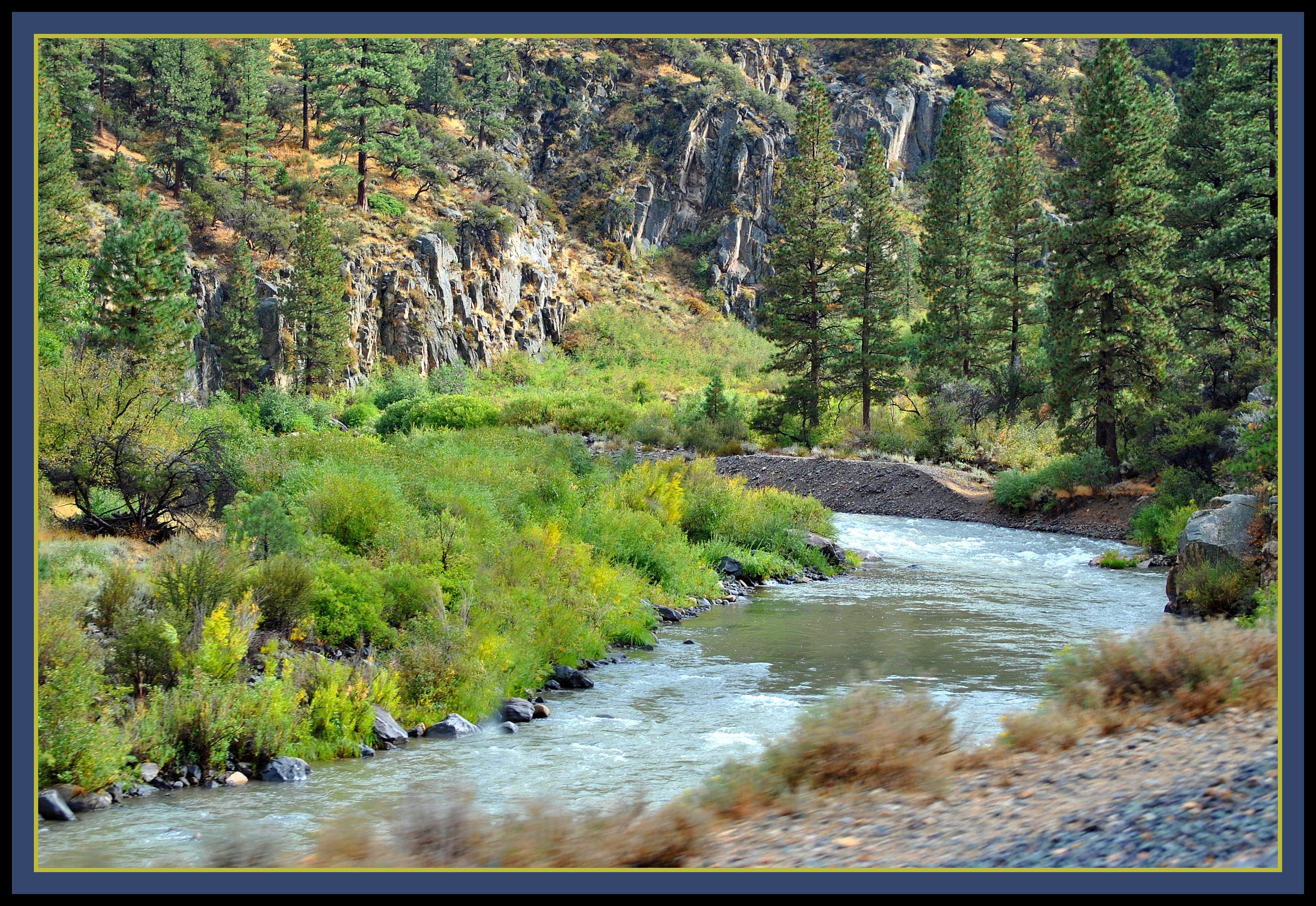
- The Truckee River near Floriston

- Location of Floriston in Nevada County, California.

- Location in California
- Coordinates: 39°23′35″N 120°00′55″W
- Country: United States
- State: California
- County: Nevada

Area
  - Total: 0.949 sq mi (2.459 km^{2})
  - Land: 0.949 sq mi (2.459 km^{2})
  - Water: 0 sq mi (0 km^{2}) 0%
- Elevation: 5,400 ft (1,600 m)

Population (2020)
  - Total: 80
  - Density: 84/sq mi (33/km^{2})
- Time zone: UTC-8 (Pacific (PST))
  - Summer (DST): UTC-7 (PDT)
- FIPS code: 06-24526

Floriston is an unincorporated community and census-designated place in Nevada County, California. It is situated at an elevation of 5,400 ft (1,600 m) above sea level. Floriston is located on the Truckee River, 10 miles (16.1 km) east-northeast of Truckee. Formerly an important railroad stop and mill town, Floriston survives to this day as a small residential community. The population was 80 at the 2020 census.

== Name ==
The name comes from the flowers at the place. It is probably coined from the Latin or Spanish stem flor 'flower.'

== History ==
The railroad station was established in the 1870s with the name of Bronco after the name of the creek a mile to the south. The Floriston post office opened in 1891.

== Geography ==
Floriston is located east of Truckee in the canyon of the Truckee River, a short distance north of the bend where it turns north from its previous eastward course. The community is located on a small gently sloped area on the east bank of the river next to Interstate 80, which crosses the river nearby. Steep canyon walls thousands of feet high rise up from the river on both sides.

=== Climate ===
Floriston has a dry-summer continental climate (Köppen Dsb) with a moderate amount of precipitation, much of it falling as snow in the wintertime. Diurnal temperature variation is large, with average highs above freezing year-round, and quite cold nighttime temperatures even in midsummer. The community, deep in a canyon on the eastern slope of the Sierra Nevada, experiences a moderate rain shadow effect due to the Sierra crest 20 miles (32 km) to the west. However, this rain shadow is much less pronounced than that of the lower terrain to the east. As a result, Floriston is located in a transition zone between the lush forests of the Sierra and the desert valleys to the east.

Climate data for Floriston, California
Month	Jan	Feb	Mar	Apr	May	Jun	Jul	Aug	Sep	Oct	Nov	Dec	Year
Mean daily maximum °F (°C)	42.7 (5.9)	46.0 (7.8)	51.3 (10.7)	57.6 (14.2)	66.3 (19.1)	75.9 (24.4)	84.7 (29.3)	84.1 (28.9)	77.6 (25.3)	65.9 (18.8)	51.6 (10.9)	42.4 (5.8)	62.2 (16.8)
Daily mean °F (°C)	30.5 (−0.8)	33.4 (0.8)	38.3 (3.5)	43.4 (6.3)	50.8 (10.4)	58.5 (14.7)	65.4 (18.6)	64.5 (18.1)	58.1 (14.5)	48.7 (9.3)	38.1 (3.4)	30.7 (−0.7)	46.7 (8.2)
Mean daily minimum °F (°C)	18.3 (−7.6)	20.9 (−6.2)	25.3 (−3.7)	29.2 (−1.6)	35.2 (1.8)	41.1 (5.1)	46.0 (7.8)	44.9 (7.2)	38.7 (3.7)	31.4 (−0.3)	24.7 (−4.1)	19.0 (−7.2)	31.2 (−0.4)
Average precipitation inches (mm)	3.35 (85)	3.94 (100)	3.06 (78)	1.35 (34)	0.93 (24)	0.62 (16)	0.28 (7.1)	0.25 (6.4)	0.66 (17)	1.64 (42)	2.64 (67)	4.04 (103)	22.75 (578)
Source: PRISM Climate Group

== Demographics ==
Historical population
Census	Pop.	Note	%±
2010	73		—
2020	80		9.6%
U.S. Decennial Census; 2000 2010

Floriston first appeared as a census designated place in the 2010 U.S. census.

The 2020 United States Census reported that Floriston was home to 80 people. The population was spread out among 35 households, including 22 families. 8 households included children under the age of 18. Of the 80 people who lived in Floriston, 66 were white, 2 were from some other race, and 12 were of mixed-race origin. The community had 20 people under the age of 18, and 12 people aged 65 or older. The median age was 38.6 years. There were 58 males and 22 females.

== Politics ==
California is an overwhelmingly Democratic state, and its representation in the U.S. Senate reflects that – the state's Senators, Alex Padilla and Laphonza Butler, are both Democrats. However, befitting its location in the rural and conservative-leaning Sierra Nevada, Floriston is represented by Republicans in the House of Representatives at the federal level and in both legislative bodies at the state level. In the state legislature, Floriston is in the 4th senatorial district, represented by Republican Marie Alvarado-Gil, and the 1st Assembly district, represented by Republican Heather Hadwick. Federally, Floriston is in California's 3rd congressional district, represented by Independent Kevin Kiley.

Like much of the Truckee–Tahoe area, with its large population of transplants and seasonal residents from the San Francisco Bay Area, Floriston itself leans strongly Democratic. In the 2016 election, voters in Floriston's voting precinct, which also encompasses other rural areas east of Truckee, cast 69 votes for Hillary Clinton and 37 votes for Donald Trump.

=== Government ===
As an unincorporated community, Floriston has no government institutions of its own. Governmental duties are handled by Nevada County. Floriston is located in Nevada County's 5th supervisorial district, represented by Hardy Bullock.

== Education ==
It is in the Tahoe-Truckee Unified School District.
