= Blue Tent, California =

Blue Tent
- Mining community
- Ice Harvesting on Rock Creek near Blue Tent
- Interactive map of Blue Tent
- Country: United States
- State: California
- Township: Nevada
- Established: 1850

Population (1860)
  - Total: 300

Blue Tent was a historic 19th century gold mining community located about 6 miles (9.7 km) northeast of Nevada City, California. Its approximate location was at the intersection of North Bloomfield Road and Blue Tent School Road. It was part of Nevada Township.

== Early history ==
=== The community ===
Blue Tent lies on a gold-bearing channel of an ancient river bed. The channel runs from the San Juan Ridge through Scotts Flat, California, Hunt's Hill, California, and You Bet, California to Dutch Flat, California and Placer County.

Blue Tent was established in 1850 and named after its first dwelling, a tent made of blue denim. The community thrived, becoming a center for hydraulic mining. Before long, it had its own store, dance hall, blacksmith shop, boarding house and other buildings. A non-denominational Union Church was erected in 1861.

Blue Tent also served as a supply base for the more remote mines in that part of Nevada County. The firm of Lindsay & Dick distributed supplies from Blue Tent by pack train. In 1853, a stagecoach line was started that connected Blue Tent with Nevada City and Downieville, California.

No accurate population figures are readily available. However, in the 1860 United States presidential election, 60 votes were cast in Blue Tent for candidates Abraham Lincoln, 15 for Stephen A. Douglas and 33 for John C. Breckinridge. This suggests a total population at that time in the range of 3-500.

A school was established in 1868. In 1879, the Blue Tent school district had 37 students, of whom 20 were boys, and one female teacher. The schoolhouse was originally close to the N. Bloomfield Road. In 1892, it was moved to its present location on what is now Blue Tent School Road. The school continued to serve the community until 1961, though there were times when the school was closed due to lack of a teacher.

Blue Tent had its own Chinatown, located near the lime kiln about two miles south of the Yuba River. Over 500 Chinese workers, most of them miners, inhabited the community. However, these workers were eventually fired, due to pressure from white miners and the local community.

In 1878, Blue Tent was connected to the world's first long distance telephone line, established in 1878 to link the mining communities around the San Juan Ridge. A US Post Office branch was established in 1878. David Hughes, Superintendent of the Blue Tent Mining Company, was the first postmaster. The post office closed in 1889.

For recreation, residents of Blue Tent participated in ice skating when the reservoir above the town froze, horse racing, and balls at the St. Louis House. They could also take Hydrotherapy from Mrs. Stone, described as "a lady of rare capability… thoroughly versed" in the art of hydropathy. At the same time, Blue Tent had its share of robberies, and arson.

=== Other businesses in Blue Tent ===
Though known as a center for hydraulic mining, there was also drift mining around Blue Tent. In one reported instance, Weston, Holmes and Co set off a blast of 304 kegs of black powder inside a tunnel that ran 65 feet into a hill.

Hydraulic mining required large amounts of water. A ditch bringing water from Rock Creek was built by the South Yuba Canal Company in 1857 and significantly enlarged in 1860 to accommodate the growing mines.

Mining also required lumber. J. N. Turner erected a sawmill in 1857. Other sawmills were built by the Cooper brothers, Roberts and Brewer. In addition, near Brewer's sawmill, was Prosper's charcoal pit, charcoal being often used as a coal substitute.

The ditch, and the reservoir it created, gave rise to another local industry, Ice cutting. In 1867, the Nevada Ice Co. began harvesting blocks of ice and shipping them throughout the California. Ice was harvested as late as 1910. Blue Tent also had its own lime kiln, producing a kind of mortar used in construction.

Hydraulic mining reached its heyday in the 1870s. The principal mine was the Blue Tent Gold Mining Company, which produced $780,00 in gold in 1873 alone. Between 1874 and 1876, the Blue Tent Mining and Water Company spent $160,000 constructing a ditch to bring water from far up the South Yuba River. At the head of the ditch was a four and a half mile flume, below which was a 1000 foot long tunnel. By 1880, the ditch was 30 miles long.

== End of hydraulic mining ==
Like the other communities in the region that depended on hydraulic mining, Blue Tent began to decline following the 1884 Sawyer decision. A farmer near Sacramento had sued the major mining company in state court to stop it from discharging mining debris into the Yuba River. This debris was destroying farmland downstream. By the early 1890s, the Blue Tent mine was closed.

Subsequently, the mine was operated until 1906 as a drift mine. In 1907, the Blue Tent mine, renamed the Channel mine, was reopened to resume hydraulicing. Soon thereafter, the miners went on strike, seeking an eight-hour work day. The mine closed in 1916 and about a year later a fire destroyed its 20 stamp mill. The uninsured loss was estimated at $15,000.

There were other efforts to resume mining. To help, in 1914, the road between Nevada City and Blue Tent was improved, cutting the distance by a mile. In 1909, there was what one newspaper described as an "extremely rich" ore discovery at the Native Son mine. Efforts were also made to resume hydraulic mining, in 1914 by D. A. Campbell, and in 1918 by Eleanor Hoeft, who sought a permit to contain the debris so it would not enter the Yuba River, but these do not appear to have succeeded.

== Agriculture ==
As mining declined in Blue Tent, agriculture started taking over. Two prominent families in the Blue Tent area were the Arbogasts and the Brindejohns. Jacob Arbogast came to Nevada County around 1860 and mined around Blue Tent. He bought 160 acres of land, which he first mined and later farmed. His son John Peter took over the family ranch, expanded to 360 acres, and became a successful farmer. The Brindejohns, natives of Brittany in France, arrived in Blue Tent around 1864. Louis Brindejohn acquired 400 acres of land, which he farmed. His three sons, Louis, Eugene and Paul attended the Blue Tent school and jointly managed the family farm.

== Blue Tent today ==
Today, the Blue Tent district is a rural, largely residential area. The only substantial evidence of the former mining district is the Blue Tent school, which remains at the site to which it was moved in 1892. It has been converted to a private residence..

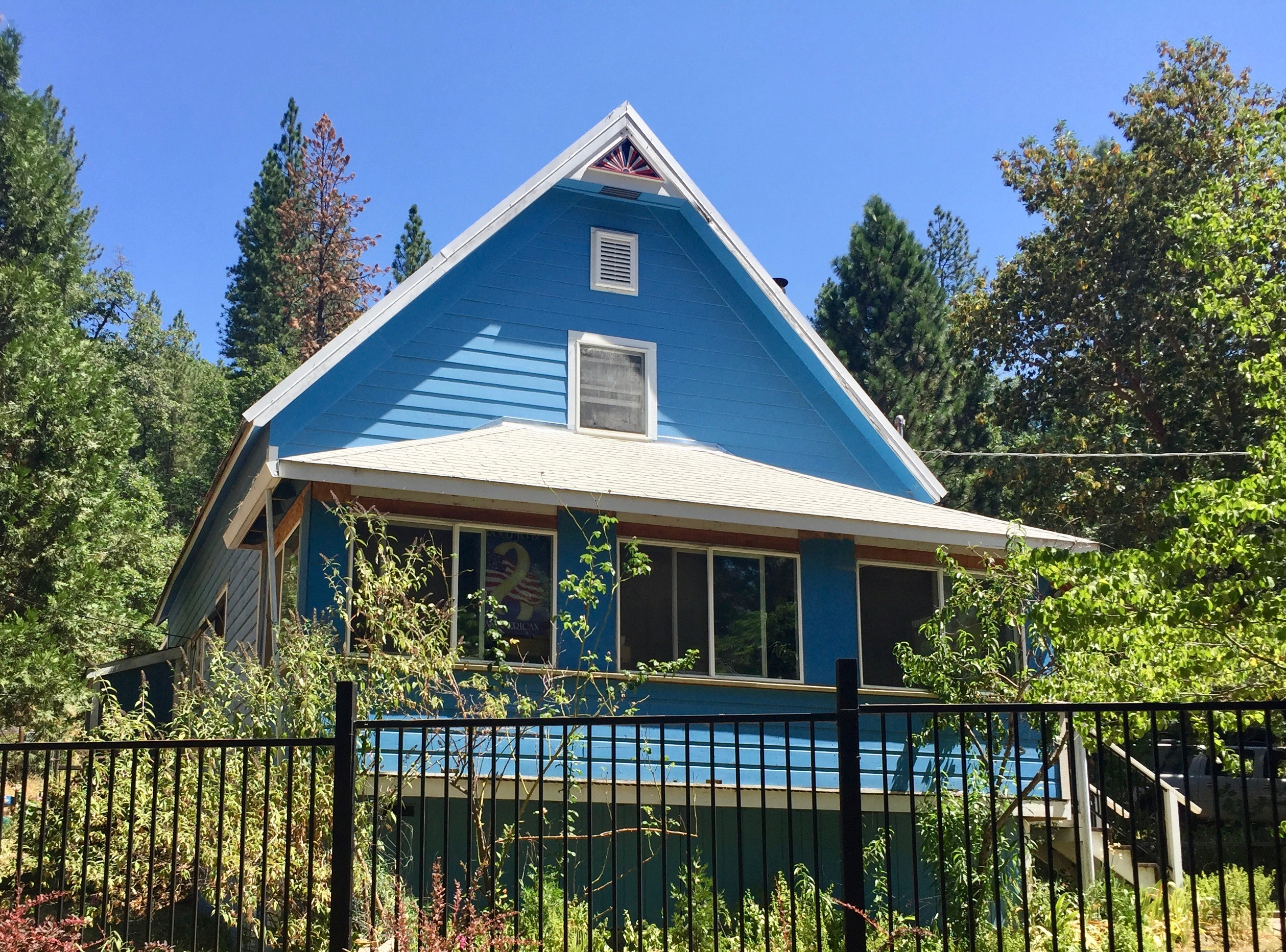
Blue Tent School
