= North Tahoe High School =

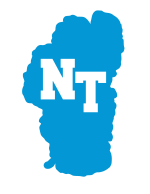

Location
- Tahoe City, (Placer County), California; United States
- Coordinates: 39.194192°N 120.119953°W

Information
- Type: Public Secondary
- School district: Tahoe-Truckee Unified School District
- Principal: Joanna Mitchell
- Teaching staff: 26.52 (FTE)
- Grades: 9th – 12th
- Enrollment: 491 (2023–2024)
- Student to teacher ratio: 18.51
- Colors: Dark blue and white
- Athletics: Volleyball, soccer, basketball, cheerleading, football, Nordic skiing, Alpine skiing, Snowboarding, cross country, track and field, softball, baseball
- Mascot: Laker
- Website: nths.ttusd.org

North Tahoe High School is a public high school located in the eastern Placer County settlement of Tahoe City, California, on the northern side of Lake Tahoe. It is one of two high schools in Tahoe-Truckee Unified School District; its counterpart is Truckee High School in nearby Truckee.

North Tahoe High competes in the Nevada Interscholastic Activities Association, along with four other similarly isolated California schools, including South Tahoe High and Truckee High.

== Extracurricular activities ==
=== Athletics ===
The North Tahoe Lakers participate in NIAA 2A and 3A divisions across fall, winter, and spring athletics, while representing the school in CNISSF competitions for Downhill and Nordic skiing.

==== Nevada 2A state championships ====
- Boys Cross Country: 1982, 1984, 1985, 1986, 1987, 1989, 1991, 1992, 1993, 1994, 1995, 2010, 2012, 2013, 2014, 2015, 2016, 2017, 2018, 2019, 2021, 2022, 2023, 2024
- Girl Cross Country: 1982, 1987, 1988, 1989, 1990, 2014, 2015, 2016, 2017, 2018, 2019, 2022, 2024

==== Nevada 3A state championships ====
- Boys Cross Country: 1996, 1997, 1998
- Girl Cross Country: 1998, 2006
