= Grass Valley School District =

School district in California, United States

Address
- 10840 Gilmore Way Grass Valley, California, 95945; United States

District information
- Type: Public
- Grades: K–8
- NCES District ID: 0615780

Students and staff
- Students: 1,694 (2020–2021)
- Teachers: 77.49 (FTE)
- Staff: 102.77 (FTE)
- Student–teacher ratio: 21.86:1

Other information
- Website: www.gvsd.us

Grass Valley Elementary School District is a public school district based in Nevada County, California, United States.

The district includes Grass Valley and a section of Alta Sierra.

== Schools ==
Middle school:

- Lyman Gilmore Middle School (grades 5-8)

Elementary school:

- Bell Hill Academy (grades TK-4)
- Margaret G. Scotten School (TK-4)

Preschool:

- Grass Valley Preschools (Preschool)

Affiliated charter schools:

- Grass Valley Charter School (Pre-K-8)
