= Nevada County, California =

County in California, United States

Coordinates: 39.30°N 120.77°W

Nevada County
- County
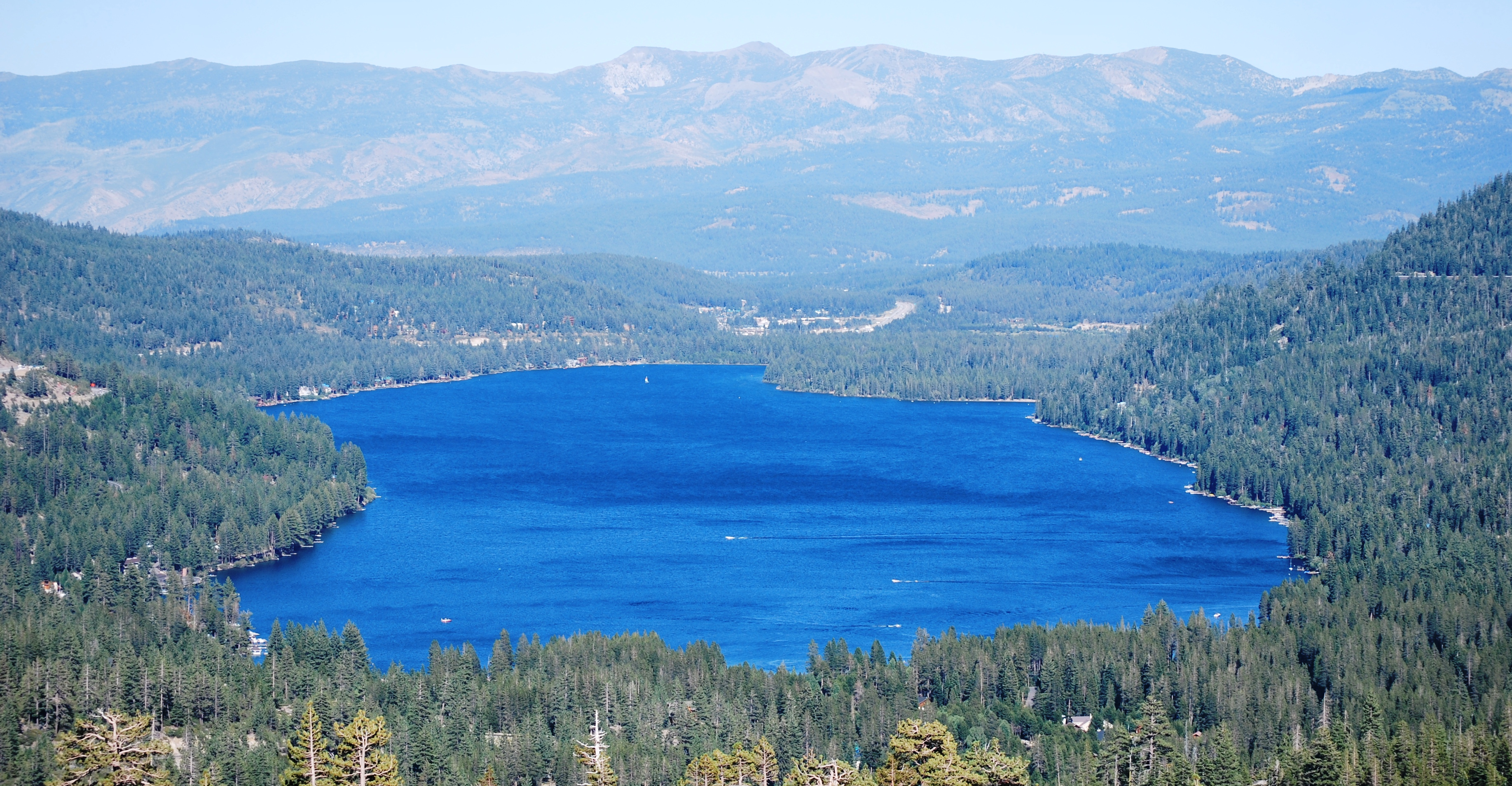
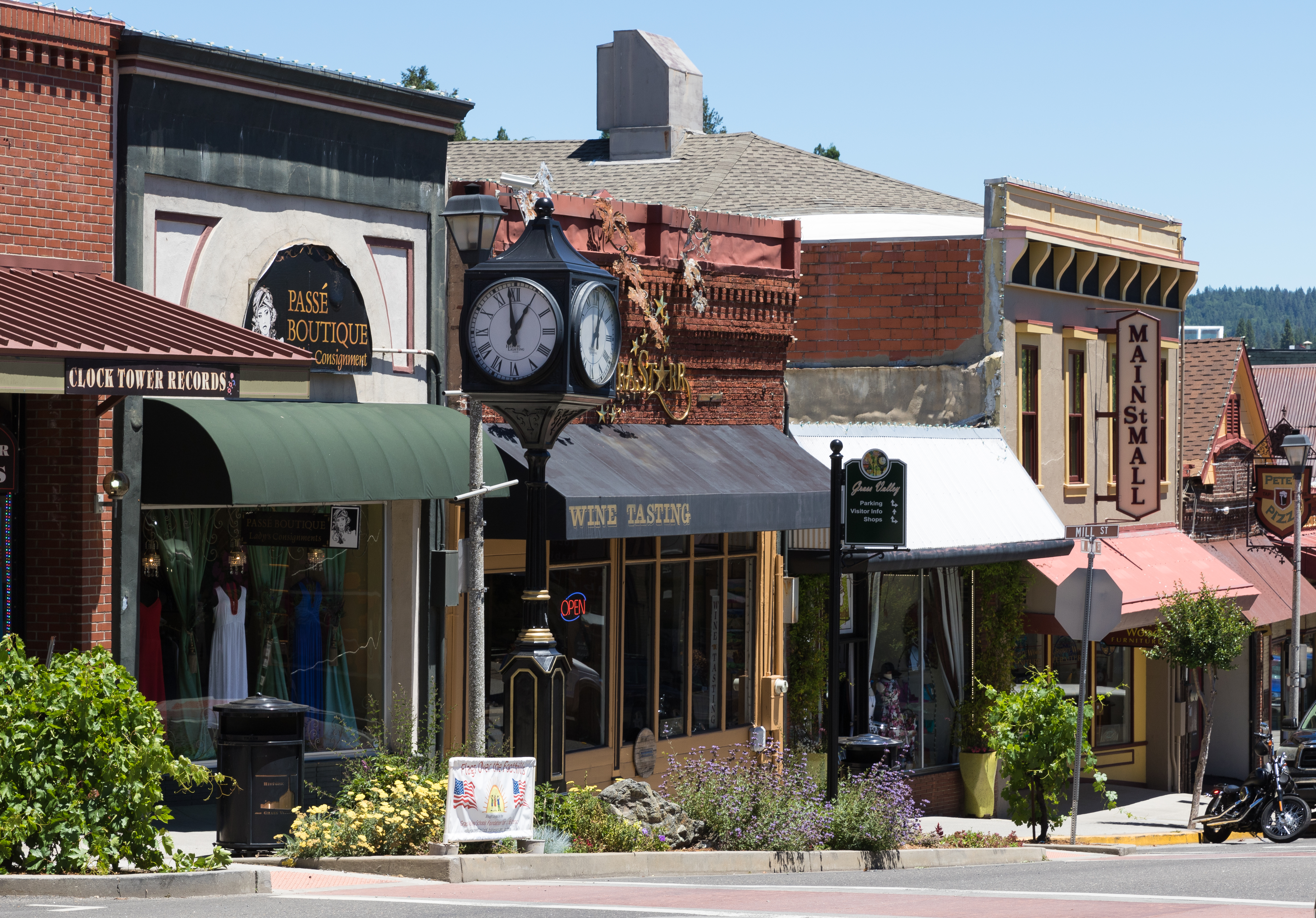
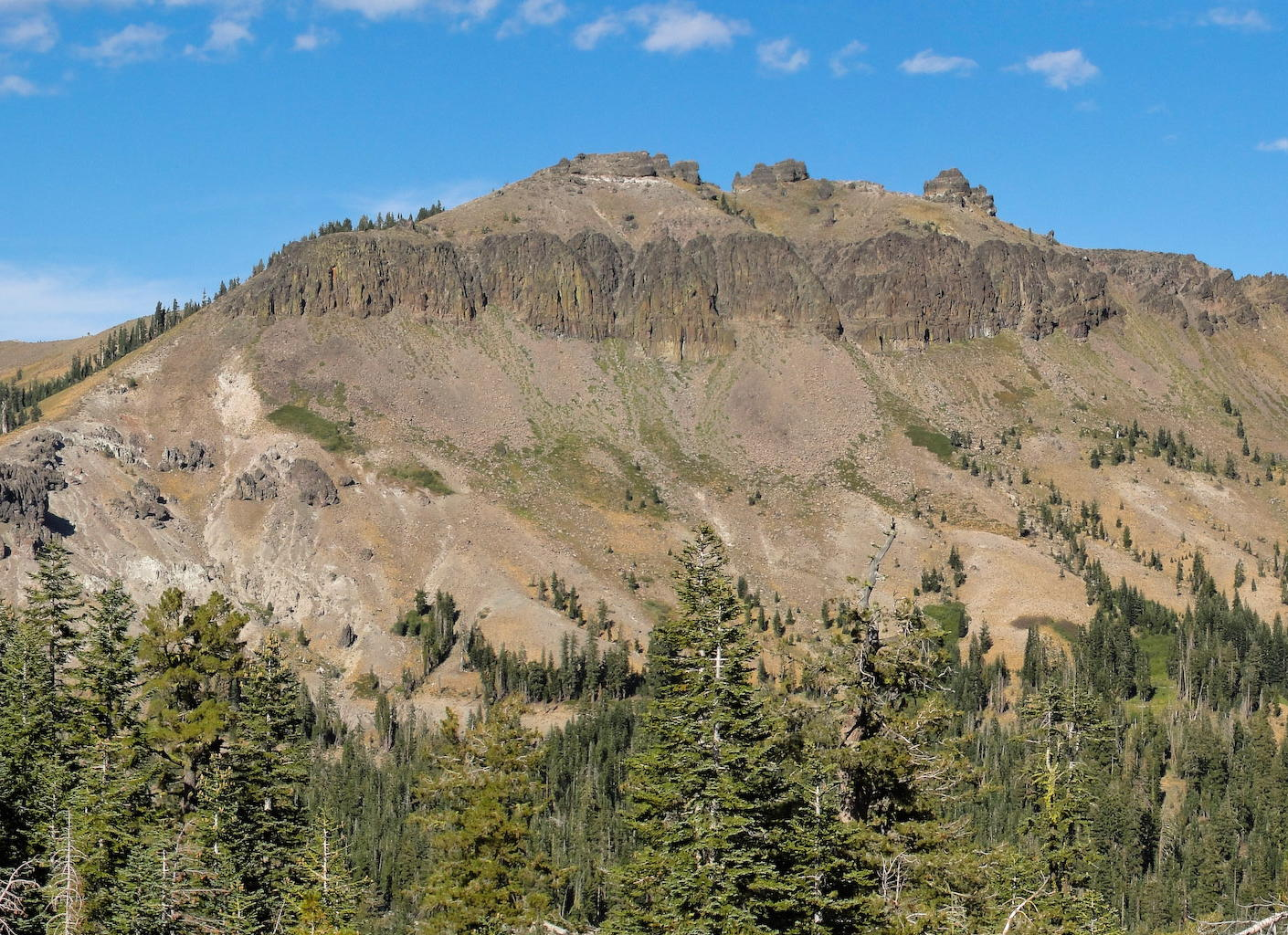
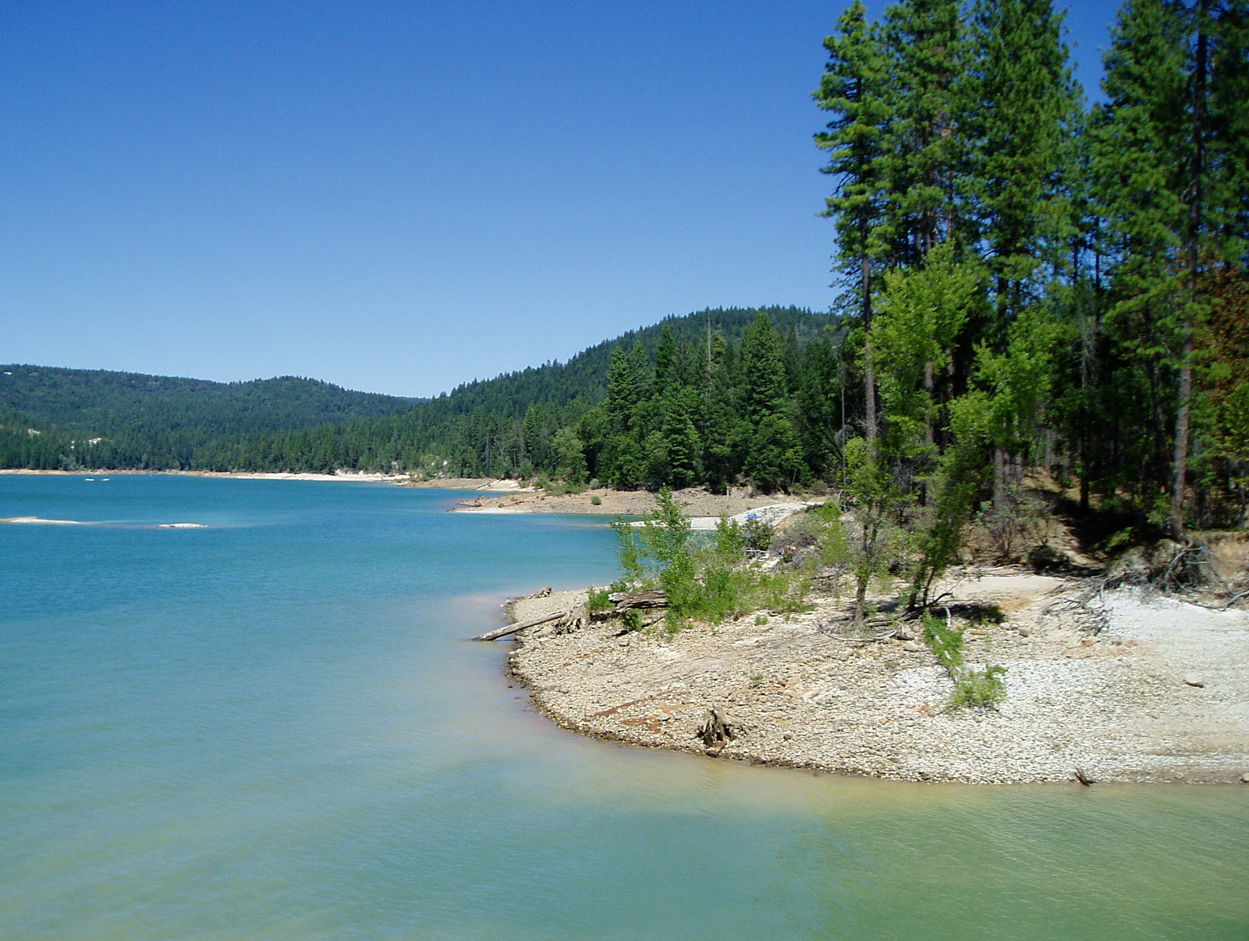
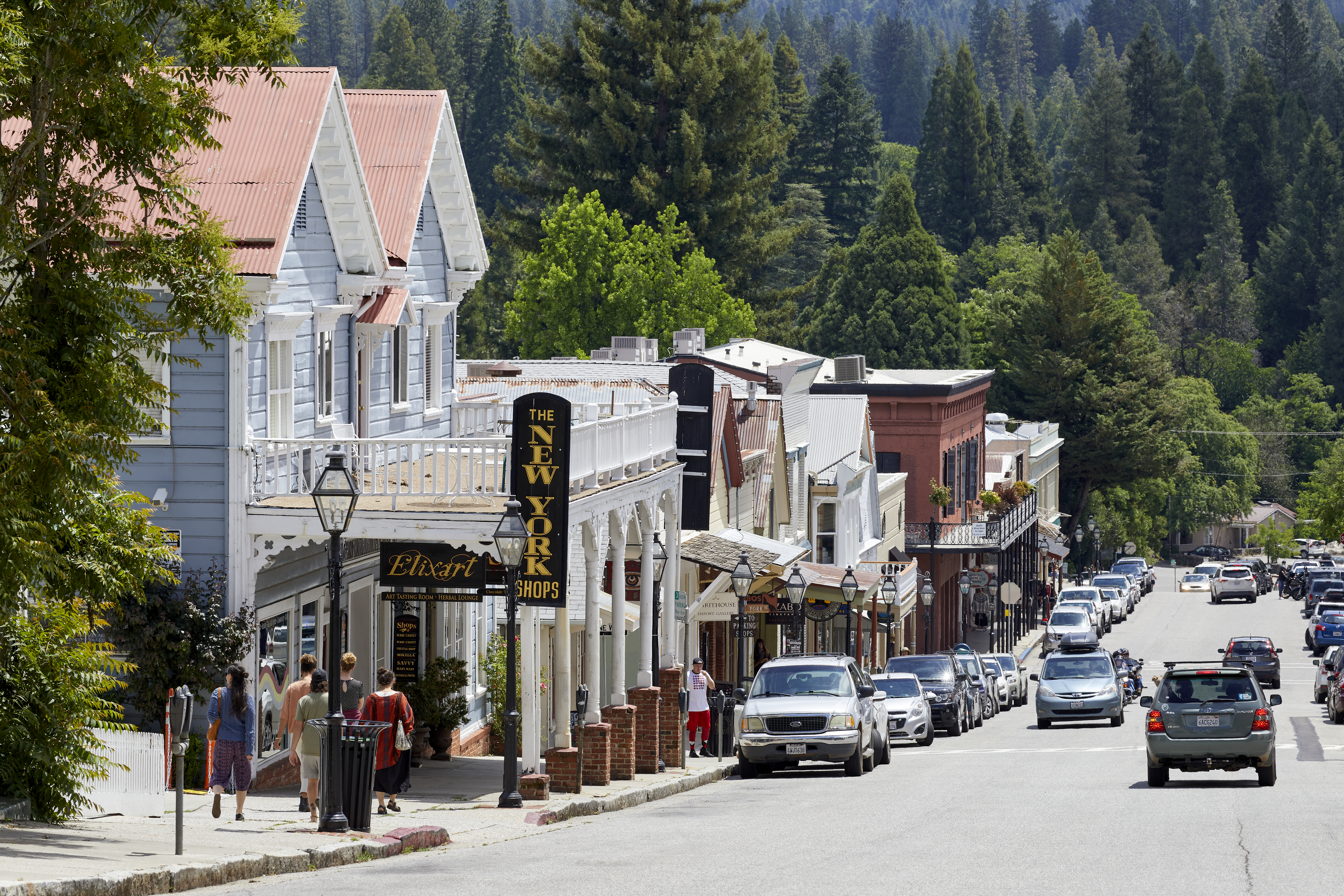
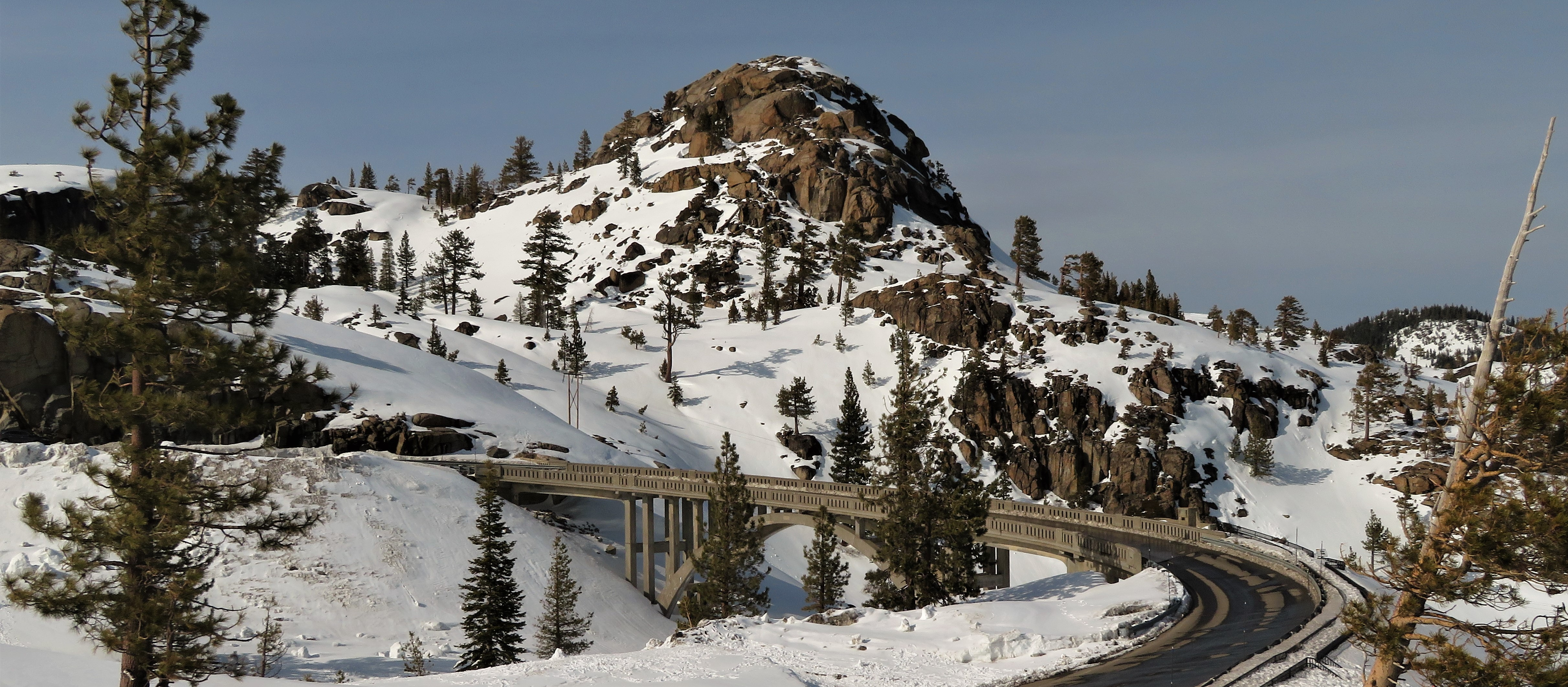
- Donner Lake in the Sierra Nevada Grass Valley Castle Peak Tahoe Forest Nevada City George R. Stewart Peak

- Seal
- Motto: "We're Better Together"
- Interactive map of Nevada County
- Location in the state of California
- Country: United States
- State: California
- Region: Sierra Nevada
- Metropolitan area: Greater Sacramento
- Incorporated: April 25, 1851
- Named for: Nevada City, which is named after the Spanish word for "snow-covered"
- County seat: Nevada City
- Largest town: Truckee

Government
  - Type: Council–CEO
  - Chair: Lisa Swarthout
  - Vice Chair: Susan Hoek
  - Board of Supervisors: Supervisors: Heidi Hall; Robb Tucker; Lisa Swarthout; Susan Hoek; Hardy Bullock
  - County executive officer: Alison Lehman

Area
  - Total: 974 sq mi (2,520 km^{2})
  - Land: 958 sq mi (2,480 km^{2})
  - Water: 16 sq mi (41 km^{2})
- Highest elevation: 9,152 ft (2,790 m)

Population (2020)
  - Total: 102,241
  - Estimate (2025): 101,911 ▼
  - Density: 107/sq mi (41.2/km^{2})

GDP
  - Total: $5.393 billion (2022)
- Time zone: UTC-8 (Pacific Time Zone)
  - Summer (DST): UTC-7 (Pacific Daylight Time)
- Area code: 530
- FIPS code: 06-057
- GNIS feature ID: 1682927
- Congressional district: 3rd
- Website: www.nevadacountyca.gov

Nevada County (/nɪˈvædə/ niv-AD-ə; Nevada, Spanish for "Snowy") is a county located in the U.S. state of California, in the Sierra Nevada. As of the 2020 United States census, its population was 102,241. The county seat is Nevada City. Nevada County comprises the Truckee-Grass Valley micropolitan statistical area, which is also included in the Sacramento-Roseville combined statistical area, part of the Mother Lode Country.

The largest and most populated city in Nevada County as of the 2020 census is Truckee.

== History ==
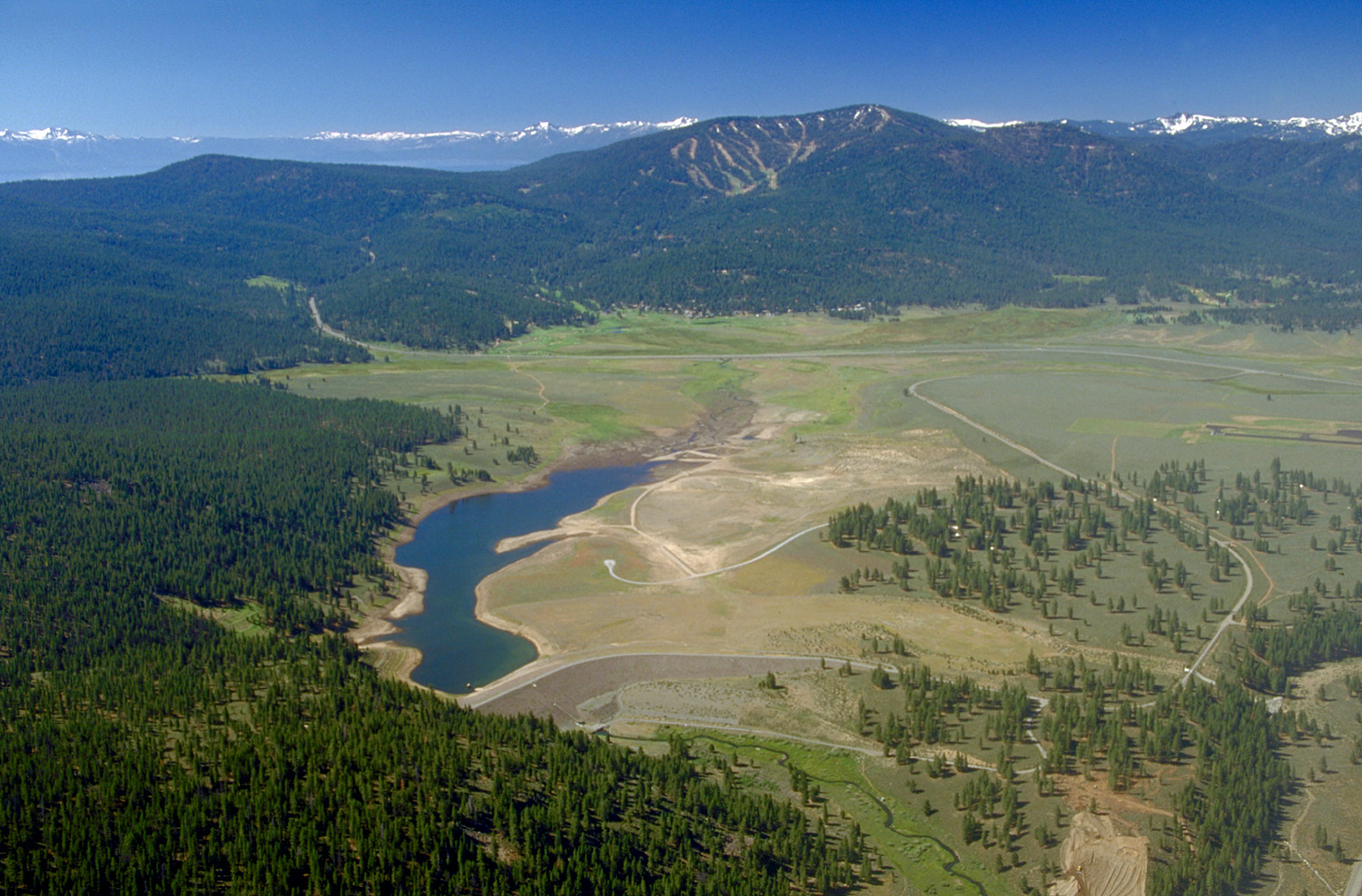
Martis Creek Lake and Dam at the southern edge of eastern Nevada County near Truckee: At full pool, the lake extends into Placer County in the distance to the south.

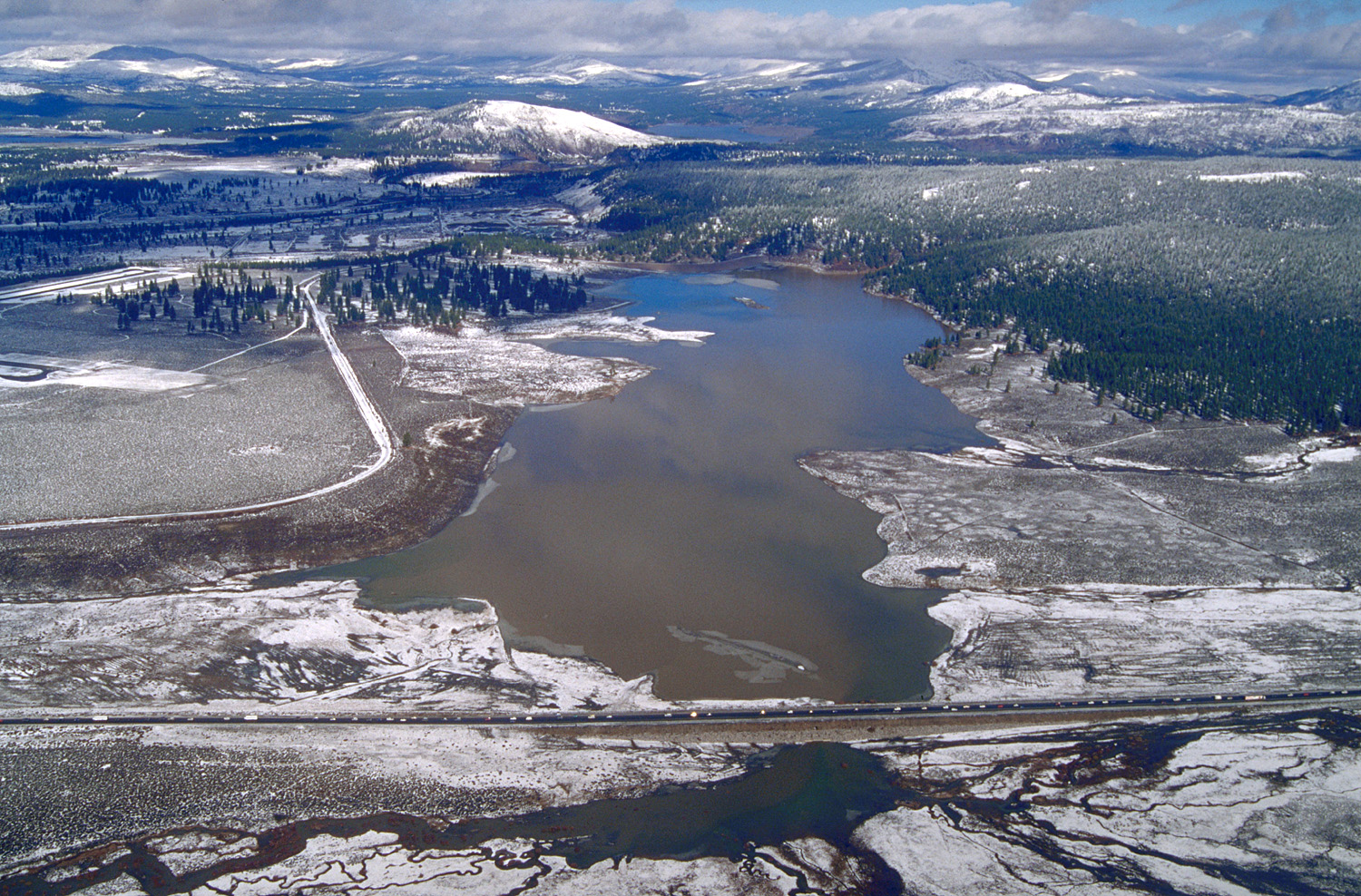
Martis Creek Lake and Dam in Nevada County: This picture was taken over Placer County, looking north into Nevada County.

Created in 1851, from portions of Yuba County, Nevada County was named after the mining town of Nevada City, a name derived from the Sierra Nevada Mountains. The word nevada is Spanish for "snowy" or "snow-covered". Charles Marsh was one of the first settlers in what became Nevada City, and is perhaps the one who named the town. He went on to build extensive water flumes/ditches/canals in the area, and was influential in the building of the first transcontinental railroad and the Nevada County Narrow Gauge Railroad.

Nevada City was the first to use the word "Nevada" in its name. In 1851, the newly formed Nevada County used the same name as the county seat. The bordering state of Nevada used the same name in 1864. The region came to life in the Gold Rush of 1849. Many historical sites remain to mark the birth of this important region in California's formative years. Among them are the Nevada Theatre in Nevada City, the oldest theater built in California in 1865. It operates to this day and once hosted Mark Twain, among other historical figures. The Old 5 Mile House stagecoach stop, built in 1890, also operates to this day as a provider of hospitality spanning three centuries. This historical site still features "The stagecoach safe" that is on display outside the present-day restaurant and is the source of many legends of stagecoach robbers and notorious highwaymen in the California gold rush era. The gold industry in Nevada County thrived into the post-WWII days.

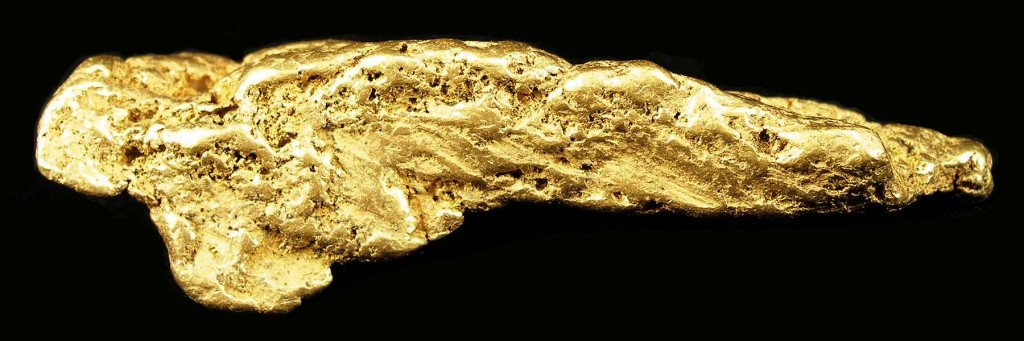
Gold nugget of about 6 troy ounces, from the Yuba River placers of Nevada County - size: 8.3 x 2.8 x 2.3 cm

The county had many firsts and historic technological moments. The first long-distance telephone in the world, built in 1877 by the Ridge Telephone Company, connected French Corral, California with French Lake, 58 miles (93 km) away. It was operated by the Milton Mining Company from a building on this site that had been erected about 1853. The Pelton wheel, designed to power gold mines, still drives hydroelectric generators today. Nevada City and Grass Valley were among the first California towns with electric lights. The Olympics, NASA, and virtually every television station around the country uses video/broadcasting equipment designed and manufactured by Grass Valley Group, founded in Grass Valley.

The Nevada County Narrow Gauge Railroad, built in 1876, was the only railroad in the West that was never robbed, though its primary freight was gold. (Builder-owner John Flint Kidder's reputation made it clear that he would personally hunt down and kill anyone who tried.) The rail line closed in 1942 and was torn up for scrap.

In Grass Valley, the historic Holbrooke Hotel opened in 1851 and housed Mark Twain, Bret Harte, and four U.S. Presidents (Ulysses S. Grant, Grover Cleveland, Benjamin Harrison, and James A. Garfield).

The community of Rough and Ready seceded from the Union for a time and became the Great Republic of Rough and Ready.

Nevada County is home to the Empire Mine State Historic Park, which is the site of one of the oldest, deepest, and richest gold mines in California. The park is in Grass Valley at 10791 East Empire Street. In operation for more than 100 years, the mine extracted 5.8 million ounces of gold before it closed in 1956.

In 1988, the 49er Fire was accidentally started near Highway 49 by a homeless local man who was suffering from undiagnosed schizophrenia. The fire went on to burn well over 100 homes and more than 33,000 acres in Nevada County.

The 2001 Nevada County shootings occurred on January 10, 2001, in which Scott Harlan Thorpe murdered three people in a shooting spree. Two of the victims were murdered in Nevada City and a third victim was killed in Grass Valley. Thorpe was arrested and declared not guilty by reason of insanity. He currently resides in Napa State Hospital.

=== Boundary dispute with Sierra County ===
Since the enactment of the statute in which the California State Legislature defined the common boundary between Nevada and Sierra Counties in 1874, no survey was conducted to determine where the straight line segment of the common boundary between the two counties ran. In particular, the statute, at the time codified as Section 3921 of the California Political Code, at the time stated:

...thence south on said state line (state of Nevada) to the northeast corner of Nevada County, a point east of the source of the South Fork of the Middle Yuba River; thence west to the source of, and down the South Fork of the Middle Yuba River to a point ten miles above the mouth of the latter.

Since the line had never been surveyed and the legislature never defined where the "point east of the source of the South Fork of the Middle Yuba River" was, the location of the straight air line between the state line and this point was unknown. As such, both counties claimed that the point east of the source, which itself was also unknown, was located in different places. This created a situation where a strip of land averaging 1.22 miles in width and around 31.29 square miles were under dispute, with Sierra County claiming that Nevada County was encroaching on their jurisdiction when attempting to levy property taxes. The trial court of Plumas County, sided with Sierra County, declaring that the disputed area had always belonged to Sierra, since the legislature defined the boundary in dispute by referencing Public Land Survey System lines. It also determined that the source of South Fork of the Middle Yuba was that of several springs in the Sierra Nevada, rather than the artificial English Lake, which ceased to exist after the failure of its dam in 1883, which is where the source of the South Fork was in the eyes of Nevada County. The California Supreme Court affirmed the trial court's decision on December 28, 1908.

== Geography ==
According to the U.S. Census Bureau, the county has a total area of 974 square miles (2,520 km^{2}), of 16 square miles (41 km^{2}) (1.6%) are covered by water. The county is drained by Middle and South Yuba Rivers.

The western part of the county is defined by the course of several rivers and the irregular boundaries of adjoining counties. When the county was created, the founders wanted to include access to the transcontinental railroad, so a rectangular section was added that includes the railroad town of Truckee.

Nevada County is one of four counties in the United States to border a state with which it shares the same name (the other three counties are Texas County, Oklahoma; Delaware County, Pennsylvania; and Ohio County, West Virginia).

=== Ecology ===
The county has substantial areas of forest, grassland, savanna, riparian area, and other ecosystems. Forests include both coniferous- and oak-dominated woodland types. Also, numerous understory forbs and wildflowers occur, including the yellow mariposa lily (Calochortus luteus).

=== Adjacent counties ===
- Sierra County - north
- Washoe County, Nevada - east
- Placer County - south
- Yuba County - west

=== National protected areas ===
- Tahoe National Forest (part)
- Toiyabe National Forest (part)

=== Climate ===
Climate data for Grass Valley, California, 1991–2020 normals, extremes 1966–present
Month	Jan	Feb	Mar	Apr	May	Jun	Jul	Aug	Sep	Oct	Nov	Dec	Year
Record high °F (°C)	77 (25)	81 (27)	82 (28)	88 (31)	99 (37)	102 (39)	108 (42)	108 (42)	108 (42)	97 (36)	87 (31)	80 (27)	108 (42)
Mean maximum °F (°C)	67.0 (19.4)	69.1 (20.6)	72.6 (22.6)	79.0 (26.1)	85.8 (29.9)	93.9 (34.4)	97.8 (36.6)	96.9 (36.1)	93.9 (34.4)	85.9 (29.9)	75.3 (24.1)	66.3 (19.1)	99.8 (37.7)
Mean daily maximum °F (°C)	53.6 (12.0)	54.9 (12.7)	57.9 (14.4)	62.7 (17.1)	70.8 (21.6)	80.2 (26.8)	88.0 (31.1)	87.4 (30.8)	82.3 (27.9)	72.1 (22.3)	59.8 (15.4)	52.6 (11.4)	68.5 (20.3)
Daily mean °F (°C)	43.4 (6.3)	44.5 (6.9)	47.5 (8.6)	51.3 (10.7)	58.8 (14.9)	66.4 (19.1)	73.1 (22.8)	72.1 (22.3)	67.2 (19.6)	58.2 (14.6)	48.4 (9.1)	42.6 (5.9)	56.1 (13.4)
Mean daily minimum °F (°C)	33.1 (0.6)	34.2 (1.2)	37.0 (2.8)	40.0 (4.4)	46.8 (8.2)	52.6 (11.4)	58.2 (14.6)	56.8 (13.8)	52.1 (11.2)	44.2 (6.8)	37.1 (2.8)	32.6 (0.3)	43.7 (6.5)
Mean minimum °F (°C)	24.4 (−4.2)	26.0 (−3.3)	28.1 (−2.2)	30.4 (−0.9)	36.9 (2.7)	43.3 (6.3)	50.8 (10.4)	50.3 (10.2)	43.7 (6.5)	34.9 (1.6)	28.0 (−2.2)	23.7 (−4.6)	21.7 (−5.7)
Record low °F (°C)	10 (−12)	9 (−13)	19 (−7)	20 (−7)	22 (−6)	28 (−2)	35 (2)	41 (5)	25 (−4)	25 (−4)	19 (−7)	3 (−16)	3 (−16)
Average precipitation inches (mm)	9.30 (236)	8.98 (228)	8.16 (207)	4.43 (113)	2.48 (63)	0.74 (19)	0.00 (0.00)	0.11 (2.8)	0.44 (11)	2.56 (65)	5.52 (140)	10.48 (266)	53.20 (1,351)
Average snowfall inches (cm)	0.7 (1.8)	3.0 (7.6)	3.0 (7.6)	0.5 (1.3)	0.0 (0.0)	0.0 (0.0)	0.0 (0.0)	0.0 (0.0)	0.0 (0.0)	0.0 (0.0)	0.2 (0.51)	1.2 (3.0)	8.6 (21.81)
Average precipitation days (≥ 0.01 in)	12.8	11.7	12.2	8.5	5.9	2.7	0.2	0.8	1.6	4.4	8.4	12.3	81.5
Average snowy days (≥ 0.1 in)	0.3	1.0	1.0	0.3	0.0	0.0	0.0	0.0	0.0	0.0	0.1	0.3	3.0
Source 1: NOAA
Source 2: National Weather Service

Climate data for Soda Springs, California, 1991–2020 normals, extremes 1913–1959
Month	Jan	Feb	Mar	Apr	May	Jun	Jul	Aug	Sep	Oct	Nov	Dec	Year
Record high °F (°C)	61 (16)	65 (18)	64 (18)	72 (22)	79 (26)	88 (31)	91 (33)	88 (31)	92 (33)	78 (26)	72 (22)	67 (19)	92 (33)
Mean maximum °F (°C)	52.9 (11.6)	54.0 (12.2)	57.7 (14.3)	63.7 (17.6)	71.2 (21.8)	79.3 (26.3)	84.5 (29.2)	83.0 (28.3)	80.3 (26.8)	73.0 (22.8)	64.5 (18.1)	58.0 (14.4)	85.9 (29.9)
Mean daily maximum °F (°C)	36.9 (2.7)	39.2 (4.0)	42.9 (6.1)	49.5 (9.7)	55.9 (13.3)	64.4 (18.0)	73.8 (23.2)	73.4 (23.0)	68.3 (20.2)	57.9 (14.4)	47.5 (8.6)	40.7 (4.8)	54.2 (12.3)
Daily mean °F (°C)	24.9 (−3.9)	26.5 (−3.1)	30.0 (−1.1)	36.7 (2.6)	43.1 (6.2)	51.1 (10.6)	59.0 (15.0)	57.7 (14.3)	53.4 (11.9)	44.8 (7.1)	35.0 (1.7)	28.1 (−2.2)	40.9 (4.9)
Mean daily minimum °F (°C)	12.6 (−10.8)	13.6 (−10.2)	17.1 (−8.3)	23.9 (−4.5)	30.3 (−0.9)	37.8 (3.2)	44.2 (6.8)	42.0 (5.6)	37.9 (3.3)	31.0 (−0.6)	22.0 (−5.6)	15.3 (−9.3)	27.3 (−2.6)
Mean minimum °F (°C)	−6.7 (−21.5)	−7.3 (−21.8)	−1.7 (−18.7)	9.3 (−12.6)	19.4 (−7.0)	28.4 (−2.0)	36.8 (2.7)	34.9 (1.6)	27.8 (−2.3)	19.7 (−6.8)	6.1 (−14.4)	−4.3 (−20.2)	−11.9 (−24.4)
Record low °F (°C)	−24 (−31)	−28 (−33)	−20 (−29)	−10 (−23)	2 (−17)	21 (−6)	23 (−5)	24 (−4)	20 (−7)	6 (−14)	−6 (−21)	−17 (−27)	−28 (−33)
Average precipitation inches (mm)	13.16 (334)	12.26 (311)	12.14 (308)	6.99 (178)	4.74 (120)	1.57 (40)	0.43 (11)	0.45 (11)	0.99 (25)	3.89 (99)	7.57 (192)	14.35 (364)	78.54 (1,993)
Average snowfall inches (cm)	73.0 (185)	84.2 (214)	105.7 (268)	41.2 (105)	15.6 (40)	1.8 (4.6)	0.0 (0.0)	0.0 (0.0)	1.5 (3.8)	9.9 (25)	42.8 (109)	69.3 (176)	445.0 (1,130)
Average extreme snow depth inches (cm)	74 (190)	90 (230)	108 (270)	90 (230)	46 (120)	15 (38)	0 (0)	0 (0)	1 (2.5)	6 (15)	17 (43)	49 (120)	118 (300)
Average precipitation days (≥ 0.01 in)	12.2	11.6	15.9	11.2	10.8	5.5	1.8	2.8	3.8	5.9	9.3	14.1	104.9
Average snowy days (≥ 0.1 in)	10.0	10.6	13.5	7.7	3.6	0.7	0.0	0.0	0.6	1.8	6.7	11.5	66.7
Source: NOAA

Climate data for Truckee, California (Truckee Ranger Station), 1991–2020 normals, extremes 1904–2009
Month	Jan	Feb	Mar	Apr	May	Jun	Jul	Aug	Sep	Oct	Nov	Dec	Year
Record high °F (°C)	64 (18)	68 (20)	73 (23)	83 (28)	92 (33)	94 (34)	100 (38)	101 (38)	95 (35)	87 (31)	82 (28)	66 (19)	101 (38)
Mean maximum °F (°C)	52.9 (11.6)	55.0 (12.8)	60.6 (15.9)	68.9 (20.5)	78.8 (26.0)	86.8 (30.4)	91.9 (33.3)	91.1 (32.8)	86.2 (30.1)	77.7 (25.4)	65.9 (18.8)	55.0 (12.8)	94.1 (34.5)
Mean daily maximum °F (°C)	41.8 (5.4)	44.5 (6.9)	49.6 (9.8)	54.8 (12.7)	64.3 (17.9)	74.8 (23.8)	83.8 (28.8)	83.8 (28.8)	76.2 (24.6)	64.6 (18.1)	50.9 (10.5)	40.5 (4.7)	60.8 (16.0)
Daily mean °F (°C)	28.9 (−1.7)	31.1 (−0.5)	35.4 (1.9)	40.0 (4.4)	47.8 (8.8)	55.3 (12.9)	62.6 (17.0)	62.1 (16.7)	55.2 (12.9)	46.0 (7.8)	36.0 (2.2)	27.8 (−2.3)	44.0 (6.7)
Mean daily minimum °F (°C)	16.1 (−8.8)	17.6 (−8.0)	21.2 (−6.0)	25.2 (−3.8)	31.4 (−0.3)	35.8 (2.1)	41.4 (5.2)	40.3 (4.6)	34.1 (1.2)	27.5 (−2.5)	21.2 (−6.0)	15.0 (−9.4)	27.2 (−2.6)
Mean minimum °F (°C)	−4.1 (−20.1)	−1.7 (−18.7)	4.5 (−15.3)	14.7 (−9.6)	22.2 (−5.4)	27.2 (−2.7)	31.9 (−0.1)	31.2 (−0.4)	25.9 (−3.4)	18.9 (−7.3)	7.2 (−13.8)	−0.9 (−18.3)	−8.9 (−22.7)
Record low °F (°C)	−28 (−33)	−23 (−31)	−18 (−28)	1 (−17)	6 (−14)	18 (−8)	15 (−9)	20 (−7)	16 (−9)	4 (−16)	−14 (−26)	−22 (−30)	−28 (−33)
Average precipitation inches (mm)	5.68 (144)	5.09 (129)	4.46 (113)	2.13 (54)	1.49 (38)	0.57 (14)	0.26 (6.6)	0.53 (13)	0.63 (16)	1.77 (45)	2.81 (71)	5.15 (131)	30.57 (774.6)
Average snowfall inches (cm)	43.6 (111)	47.9 (122)	32.2 (82)	18.5 (47)	4.1 (10)	0.9 (2.3)	0.0 (0.0)	0.0 (0.0)	0.5 (1.3)	2.8 (7.1)	11.9 (30)	44.2 (112)	206.6 (524.7)
Average precipitation days (≥ 0.01 in)	11.9	11.0	10.0	9.4	7.3	3.2	1.9	2.0	2.8	4.9	7.7	11.6	83.7
Average snowy days (≥ 0.1 in)	8.7	8.1	6.8	5.4	1.6	0.3	0.0	0.0	0.2	1.2	3.7	7.8	43.8
Source 1: NOAA
Source 2: WRCC (mean maxima and minima 1904–2009)

Climate data for Bowman Dam, California (5400 feet)
Month	Jan	Feb	Mar	Apr	May	Jun	Jul	Aug	Sep	Oct	Nov	Dec	Year
Record high °F (°C)	75 (24)	78 (26)	83 (28)	88 (31)	93 (34)	100 (38)	102 (39)	99 (37)	98 (37)	90 (32)	82 (28)	72 (22)	102 (39)
Mean maximum °F (°C)	60 (16)	62 (17)	65 (18)	72 (22)	79 (26)	86 (30)	91 (33)	91 (33)	88 (31)	80 (27)	69 (21)	59 (15)	92 (33)
Mean daily maximum °F (°C)	46.6 (8.1)	47.6 (8.7)	49.9 (9.9)	56.1 (13.4)	64.0 (17.8)	73.5 (23.1)	81.6 (27.6)	81.9 (27.7)	76.3 (24.6)	65.5 (18.6)	53.1 (11.7)	45.8 (7.7)	61.8 (16.6)
Daily mean °F (°C)	37.0 (2.8)	37.1 (2.8)	39.1 (3.9)	43.9 (6.6)	51.3 (10.7)	60.0 (15.6)	67.3 (19.6)	67.5 (19.7)	62.6 (17.0)	53.2 (11.8)	42.8 (6.0)	36.7 (2.6)	49.9 (9.9)
Mean daily minimum °F (°C)	27.3 (−2.6)	26.5 (−3.1)	28.2 (−2.1)	31.7 (−0.2)	38.3 (3.5)	46.4 (8.0)	53.0 (11.7)	53.1 (11.7)	48.9 (9.4)	41.0 (5.0)	32.6 (0.3)	27.6 (−2.4)	37.9 (3.3)
Mean minimum °F (°C)	14 (−10)	15 (−9)	18 (−8)	21 (−6)	28 (−2)	34 (1)	44 (7)	44 (7)	38 (3)	30 (−1)	22 (−6)	16 (−9)	9 (−13)
Record low °F (°C)	−3 (−19)	−2 (−19)	4 (−16)	7 (−14)	12 (−11)	25 (−4)	32 (0)	30 (−1)	21 (−6)	18 (−8)	11 (−12)	0 (−18)	−3 (−19)
Average precipitation inches (mm)	11.91 (303)	10.94 (278)	9.60 (244)	4.85 (123)	3.30 (84)	1.20 (30)	0.19 (4.8)	0.37 (9.4)	1.00 (25)	4.04 (103)	7.89 (200)	10.47 (266)	65.76 (1,670.2)
Average snowfall inches (cm)	40.9 (104)	41.7 (106)	42.2 (107)	17.1 (43)	3.0 (7.6)	0.0 (0.0)	0.0 (0.0)	0.0 (0.0)	0.0 (0.0)	1.5 (3.8)	16.1 (41)	36.0 (91)	198.5 (503.4)
Average precipitation days (≥ 0.01 in)	12.8	11.7	12.2	8.5	5.9	2.7	0.2	0.8	1.6	4.4	8.4	12.3	81.5
Source: NOAA

== Demographics ==
Historical population
Census	Pop.	Note	%±
1860	16,446		—
1870	19,134		16.3%
1880	20,823		8.8%
1890	17,369		−16.6%
1900	17,789		2.4%
1910	14,955		−15.9%
1920	10,850		−27.4%
1930	10,596		−2.3%
1940	19,283		82.0%
1950	19,888		3.1%
1960	20,911		5.1%
1970	26,346		26.0%
1980	51,645		96.0%
1990	78,510		52.0%
2000	92,033		17.2%
2010	98,764		7.3%
2020	102,241		3.5%
2025 (est.)	101,911	▼	−0.3%
U.S. Decennial Census; 1790–1960 1900–1990; 1990–2000 2010 2020

=== 2020 census ===
As of the 2020 census, the county had a population of 102,241. The median age was 49.7 years. 17.5% of residents were under the age of 18 and 27.9% of residents were 65 years of age or older. For every 100 females there were 97.3 males, and for every 100 females age 18 and over there were 95.4 males age 18 and over.

The racial makeup of the county was 83.7% White, 0.4% Black or African American, 1.0% American Indian and Alaska Native, 1.4% Asian, 0.1% Native Hawaiian and Pacific Islander, 3.4% from some other race, and 9.9% from two or more races. Hispanic or Latino residents of any race comprised 10.2% of the population.

51.8% of residents lived in urban areas, while 48.2% lived in rural areas.

There were 42,774 households in the county, of which 23.8% had children under the age of 18 living with them and 25.0% had a female householder with no spouse or partner present. About 27.2% of all households were made up of individuals and 15.0% had someone living alone who was 65 years of age or older. There were 53,627 housing units, of which 20.2% were vacant. Among occupied housing units, 73.6% were owner-occupied and 26.4% were renter-occupied. The homeowner vacancy rate was 1.6% and the rental vacancy rate was 5.2%.

=== Racial and ethnic composition ===
Nevada County, California – Racial and ethnic composition Note: the US Census treats Hispanic/Latino as an ethnic category. This table excludes Latinos from the racial categories and assigns them to a separate category. Hispanics/Latinos may be of any race.
Race / Ethnicity (NH = Non-Hispanic)	Pop 1980	Pop 1990	Pop 2000	Pop 2010	Pop 2020	% 1980	% 1990	% 2000	% 2010	% 2020
White alone (NH)	49,235	73,697	83,098	85,477	82,810	95.33%	93.87%	90.29%	86.55%	80.99%
Black or African American alone (NH)	72	172	234	341	416	0.14%	0.22%	0.25%	0.35%	0.41%
Native American or Alaska Native alone (NH)	507	738	663	793	695	0.98%	0.94%	0.72%	0.80%	0.68%
Asian alone (NH)	245	615	702	1,124	1,371	0.47%	0.78%	0.76%	1.14%	1.34%
Native Hawaiian or Pacific Islander alone (NH)	x	x	70	96	119	0.08%	0.10%	0.08%	0.10%	0.12%
Other race alone (NH)	54	19	175	122	617	0.10%	0.02%	0.19%	0.12%	0.60%
Mixed race or Multiracial (NH)	x	x	1,890	2,372	5,797	x	x	2.05%	2.40%	5.67%
Hispanic or Latino (any race)	1,532	3,269	5,201	8,439	10,416	2.97%	4.16%	5.65%	8.54%	10.19%
Total	51,645	78,510	92,033	98,764	102,241	100.00%	100.00%	100.00%	100.00%	100.00%

=== American Community Survey 2025 data ===
The United States Census Bureau estimated that in 2025, Nevada County’s population was 101.911. It was also estimated that the county's population was 80,59% Non-Hispanic White, 11,56% Hispanic or Latino, 0,62% Non-Hispanic Black, 1,81% Asian, 0,66% Native American, 0,16% Pacific Islander, and 4,61% Multiracial.

Total	Population	Percentage
Non-Hispanic White	82.127	80,59%
Hispanic or Latino	11.776	11,56%
Non-Hispanic Black	628	0,62%
Asian	1.848	1,81%
Native American	670	0,66%
Pacific Islander	161	0,16%
Non-Hispanic Multiracial	4.701	4,61%

=== 2010 Census ===
The 2010 United States census reported that Nevada County had a population of 98,764. The racial makeup of Nevada County was 90,233 (91.4%) White, 389 (0.4%) African American, 1,044 (1.1%) Native American, 1,187 (1.2%) Asian, 110 (0.1%) Pacific Islander, 2,678 (2.7%) from other races, and 3,123 (3.2%) from two or more races. Hispanics or Latinos of any race were 8,439 persons (8.5%).

Population reported at 2010 United States census
The County	Total; Population	White	African; American	Native; American	Asian	Pacific; Islander	other races	two or more races	Hispanic or Latino (of any race)
Nevada County	98,764	90,233	389	1,044	1,187	110	2,678	3,123	8,439
Incorporated cities and towns	Total; Population	White	African; American	Native; American	Asian	Pacific; Islander	other races	two or more races	Hispanic or Latino (of any race)
Grass Valley	12,860	11,493	46	208	188	9	419	497	1,341
Nevada City	3,068	2,837	26	28	46	0	40	91	205
Truckee	16,180	13,992	60	95	241	15	1,431	346	3,016
Census-designated places	Total; Population	White	African; American	Native; American	Asian	Pacific; Islander	other races	two or more races	Hispanic or Latino (of any race)
Alta Sierra	6,911	6,436	18	55	73	9	122	198	488
Floriston	73	67	0	4	0	0	0	2	0
Graniteville	11	11	0	0	0	0	0	0	0
Kingvale‡	141	133	1	1	0	1	2	3	6
Lake of the Pines	3,917	3,669	5	20	65	7	24	127	246
Lake Wildwood	4,991	4,726	17	46	56	10	32	104	272
North San Juan	269	224	1	12	11	0	0	21	9
Penn Valley	1,621	1,434	9	34	23	0	31	90	143
Rough and Ready	963	886	3	6	16	6	11	35	56
Soda Springs	81	79	0	2	0	0	0	0	7
Washington	185	166	1	4	0	0	4	10	11
Other unincorporated areas	Total; Population	White	African; American	Native; American	Asian	Pacific; Islander	other races	two or more races	Hispanic or Latino (of any race)
All others not CDPs (combined)	47,493	44,080	202	529	468	53	562	1,599	2,639
‡ Note: these numbers reflect only the portion of this CDP in Nevada County

=== 2000 ===
As of the census of 2000, 92,033 people, 36,894 households, and 25,936 families resided in the county. The population density was 96/sq mi (37/km^{2}). The 44,282 housing units had an average density of 46 per square mile (18/km^{2}). The racial makeup of the county was 93.4% White, 0.3% African American, 0.9% Native American, 0.8% Asian, 2.0% from other races, and 2.6% from two or more races. About 5.7% of the population were Hispanics or Latinos of any race. Regarding ancestry,16.4% were German, 16.3% English, 11.1% Irish, 6.8% Italian, and 6.6% American, according to Census 2000; 94.0% spoke English and 4.2% Spanish as their first language.

Of the 36,894 households, 28.7% had children under 18 living with them, 57.6% were married couples living together, 8.8% had a female householder with no husband present, and 29.7% were not families. About 22.8% of all households were made up of individuals, and 9.8% had someone living alone who was 65 or older. The average household size was 2.47, and the average family size was 2.88.

In the county, the age distribution was 23.1% under 18, 6.1% from 18 to 24, 24.1% from 25 to 44, 29.3% from 45 to 64, and 17.4% who were 65 or older. The median age was 43 years. For every 100 females, there were 98.3 males. For every 100 females 18 and over, there were 94.7 males.

The median income for a household in the county was $45,864, and for a family was $52,697. Males had a median income of $40,742 versus $27,173 for females. The per capita income for the county was $24,007. About 5.5% of families and 8.1% of the population were below the poverty line, including 9.5% of those under age 18 and 4.9% of those age 65 or over.

== Government ==
Nevada County is a general law county governed by a five member Board of Supervisors. The Board consists of five members, elected by districts, who serve four-year staggered terms.

== Politics ==
=== Voter registration ===
Population and registered voters
Total population	98,392	
Registered voters (Note: Percentage of registered voters with respect to total population. Percentages of party members with respect to registered voters follow.)	61,557	62.6%
Democratic	20,298	33.0%
Republican	23,315	37.9%
Democratic–Republican spread	-3,017	-4.9%
American Independent	2,208	3.6%
Green	1,421	2.3%
Libertarian	585	1.0%
Peace and Freedom	140	0.2%
Americans Elect	1	0.0%
Other	140	0.2%
No party preference	13,449	21.8%

==== Cities by population and voter registration ====
Cities by population and voter registration
City	Population	Registered voters	Democratic	Republican	D–R spread	Other	No party preference
Grass Valley	12,793	50.4%	36.9%	33.4%	+3.5%	10.7%	22.7%
Nevada City	3,081	67.2%	44.5%	22.1%	+22.4%	13.3%	23.7%
Truckee	16,009	52.8%	39.4%	24.4%	+15.0%	11.4%	28.8%
Unincorporated Nevada County	66,509	67.0%	30.6%	41.8%	-11.2%	5.8%	20.3%

=== Overview ===
According to the California Secretary of State, as of February 10, 2019, Nevada County has 78,736 registered voters. Of those, 24,677 (36%) are registered Democrats, 22,252 (32.3%) are registered Republicans, 9,426 (13.76%) are registered to another party, and 7,845 (11.5%) have declined to state a political party. In both 2000 and 2004, George W. Bush won a majority of the votes in the county. In 2008, Barack Obama carried the county with a 51.5%–46.2% margin. 2008 marked the first time Nevada County went for a Democrat since Lyndon Johnson in 1964. In 2012, Obama lost by a narrow margin to Mitt Romney, turning the county red once again, only for Hillary Clinton to win it back in 2016 over Donald Trump. Joe Biden won the county in 2020 with the largest share of votes for a presidential candidate in recent elections, continuing its Democratic shift. Kamala Harris won the county in 2024, though with a slightly smaller percentage of the vote compared to Biden.

United States presidential election results for Nevada County, California (Note: This total comprised 1,381 votes for Progressive Theodore Roosevelt (who was official Republican nominee in California), 648 votes for Socialist Eugene V. Debs and 111 votes for Prohibition Party nominee Eugene W. Chafin.)
Year	Republican		Democratic		Third party(ies)	
Year	No.	%	No.	%	No.	%
1880	2,241	52.21%	2,029	47.27%	22	0.51%
1884	2,368	56.13%	1,791	42.45%	60	1.42%
1888	2,167	51.69%	1,923	45.87%	102	2.43%
1892	1,757	42.84%	1,634	39.84%	710	17.31%
1896	1,985	44.76%	2,360	53.21%	90	2.03%
1900	2,449	55.91%	1,758	40.14%	173	3.95%
1904	2,249	58.72%	1,167	30.47%	414	10.81%
1908	1,825	50.86%	1,368	38.13%	395	11.01%
1912	23	0.57%	1,851	46.11%	2,140	53.31%
1916	1,586	35.22%	2,548	56.58%	369	8.19%
1920	2,055	64.97%	747	23.62%	361	11.41%
1924	1,513	42.23%	307	8.57%	1,763	49.20%
1928	2,173	52.00%	1,959	46.88%	47	1.12%
1932	1,842	32.92%	3,544	63.33%	210	3.75%
1936	1,913	26.83%	5,128	71.91%	90	1.26%
1940	2,863	32.69%	5,782	66.01%	114	1.30%
1944	2,648	44.42%	3,266	54.79%	47	0.79%
1948	3,917	47.05%	3,914	47.01%	495	5.95%
1952	6,819	64.04%	3,735	35.08%	94	0.88%
1956	5,475	59.69%	3,667	39.98%	31	0.34%
1960	5,419	53.44%	4,633	45.69%	89	0.88%
1964	4,899	43.29%	6,397	56.52%	22	0.19%
1968	6,061	51.39%	4,607	39.06%	1,126	9.55%
1972	8,004	54.68%	5,693	38.89%	941	6.43%
1976	8,170	48.40%	7,926	46.95%	785	4.65%
1980	15,207	57.91%	7,605	28.96%	3,449	13.13%
1984	19,809	62.36%	11,198	35.25%	761	2.40%
1988	21,383	57.76%	14,980	40.46%	660	1.78%
1992	17,343	39.24%	15,433	34.92%	11,425	25.85%
1996	21,784	50.40%	15,369	35.56%	6,066	14.04%
2000	25,998	54.76%	17,670	37.22%	3,811	8.03%
2004	28,790	53.39%	24,220	44.92%	910	1.69%
2008	25,663	46.12%	28,617	51.43%	1,367	2.46%
2012	24,986	48.35%	24,663	47.73%	2,027	3.92%
2016	23,365	42.53%	26,053	47.43%	5,517	10.04%
2020	26,779	41.36%	36,359	56.15%	1,612	2.49%
2024	26,177	42.12%	33,784	54.36%	2,183	3.51%

Nevada County is located in California's 3rd congressional district represented by Kevin Kiley (I–Rocklin)

In the state assembly, Nevada County is in the 1st Assembly district, represented by Republican Heather Hadwick. In the state senate, the county is mostly in the 1st senatorial district, represented by Republican Megan Dahle, but a portion, including the city of Truckee, is in the 4th senatorial district, represented by Republican Marie Alvarado-Gil.

On November 4, 2008, Nevada County voted for Proposition 8, which amended the California Constitution to ban same-sex marriages by three votes, the narrowest margin of any county in the state.

== Crime ==
The following table includes the number of incidents reported and the rate per 1,000 persons for each type of offense.

Population and crime rates (2009)
Population	98,392	
Violent crime	289	2.94
Homicide	1	0.01
Forcible rape	36	0.37
Robbery	17	0.17
Aggravated assault	235	2.39
Property crime	838	8.52
Burglary	366	3.72
Larceny-theft	993	10.09
Motor vehicle theft	100	1.02
Arson	11	0.11

=== Cities by population and crime rates ===
Cities by population and crime rates
City	Population	Violent crimes	Violent crime rate per 1,000 persons	Property crimes	Property crime rate per 1,000 persons
Grass Valley	12,959	65	5.02	639	49.31
Nevada City	3,092	12	3.88	172	55.63
Truckee	16,304	22	1.35	232	14.23

== Transportation ==
=== Major highways ===
- Interstate 80
- State Route 20
- State Route 49
- State Route 89
- State Route 174
- State Route 267

=== Public transportation ===
- Nevada County Connects, operated by Nevada County, runs fixed route bus service in Grass Valley, Nevada City, Penn Valley, Alta Sierra and Lake of the Pines. A connection is available between Grass Valley and Auburn (Placer County).
- Tahoe Area Rapid Transit, operated by Placer County, has a route connecting Truckee with Lake Tahoe and the state of Nevada. Truckee also has its own local bus service.
- Greyhound buses and Amtrak's California Zephyr stop in Truckee.
- YubaBus offers Charter and Shuttle Bus service in and around Western Nevada County.

Nevada County Now is the paratransit bus company providing door to door service for seniors and persons with disabilities in Grass Valley, Nevada City, and Penn Valley.

=== Airports ===
Nevada County Air Park is a general-aviation airport located just east of Grass Valley.

Truckee Tahoe Airport is a general-aviation airport in Truckee, partially in Nevada County and partially in Placer County.

Alta Sierra Airport is a private-aviation airport located south of Grass Valley.

== Communities ==
=== Cities ===
- Grass Valley
- Nevada City (county seat)

=== Town ===
- Truckee

=== Census-designated places ===
- Alta Sierra
- Floriston
- Graniteville
- Kingvale
- Lake of the Pines
- Lake Wildwood
- North San Juan
- Penn Valley
- Rough and Ready
- Soda Springs
- Washington

=== Other unincorporated communities ===
- Anthony House – Nisenan Indian territory
- Birchville
- Blue Tent
- Boca
- Boreal
- Cedar Ridge
- Cherokee Township
- Chicago Park
- French Corral
- Lake City
- Malakoff Diggings
- Moores Flat
- Nevada City Rancheria – Nisenan Indian government settlement area
- Norden
- North Bloomfield
- North Columbia
- Ophir Hill
- Peardale
- Ready Springs
- Sunset District
- Sweetland
- You Bet
- Wolf

=== Ghost town ===
- Meadow Lake (previously: Excelsior; Summit City)

=== Population ranking ===
The population ranking of the following table is based on the 2020 census of Nevada County.

† county seat

Rank	City/Town/etc.	Municipal type	Population (2020 census)
1	Truckee	Town	16,729
2	Grass Valley	City	14,016
3	Alta Sierra	CDP	7,204
4	Lake Wildwood	CDP	5,158
5	Lake of the Pines	CDP	4,301
6	† Nevada City	City	3,152
7	Penn Valley	CDP	1,593
8	Rough and Ready	CDP	905
9	North San Juan	CDP	245
10	Kingvale (partially in Placer County)	CDP	128
11	Washington	CDP	101
12	Soda Springs	CDP	94
13	Floriston	CDP	80
14	Graniteville	CDP	1

== Education ==
There is one unified school district, Tahoe-Truckee Unified School District, as well as one secondary school district, Nevada Joint Union High School District. Elementary school districts include:

- Chicago Park Elementary School District
- Clear Creek Elementary School District
- Grass Valley Elementary School District
- Nevada City Elementary School District
- Penn Valley Union Elementary School District
- Pleasant Ridge Union Elementary School District
- Twin Ridges Elementary School District
- Union Hill Elementary School District

== Notable residents ==
- Jennie Carter, 19th Century writer and journalist
- Molly Fisk, inaugural Nevada County Poet Laureate
- Lyman Gilmore, a contemporary of the Wright Brothers who developed early powered aircraft and operated the world's first commercial air field in Grass Valley. There is also evidence he may have flown before the Wright brothers, though this claim is doubted.
- Alice Maud Hartley, killed Nevada State Senator Murray D. Foley by gunshot in 1894
- Founding member of the British rock band Supertramp, Roger Hodgson lives in Nevada County.
- Herbert Hoover, President of the United States. Hoover lived in Nevada City as a young mining engineer after graduating from Stanford University.
- Former Troubled Assets Relief Program head Neel Kashkari lives in the county as part of his "Washington detox".
- Charles Litton Sr., a resident and entrepreneur of Nevada County who assisted Raytheon in the development of the magnetron tube.
- Mark Meckler, co-founder of the Tea Party Patriots and founder of Citizens for Self-Governance
- Gertrude Penhall (1846–1929), civic leader, clubwoman, early settler
- Folk singer Utah Phillips lived in Nevada County until his death in 2008.
- Former actor and television announcer Edwin W. Reimers resided in Nevada City at the time of his death in 1986.
- Beat Poet Gary Snyder currently resides in San Juan Ridge in Nevada County.
- Clint Walker, actor.
- National Football League star Ricky Williams lives in the county.
- Chuck Yeager, pilot and first man to break the sound barrier
- John Christopher Stevens, American career diplomat and lawyer who served as the U.S. Ambassador to Libya from May 22, 2012, to September 11, 2012. Stevens was killed when the U.S. Special Mission in Benghazi, Libya, was attacked in 2012 by radical Islamic terrorists. He was born in Grass Valley and is buried in the local cemetery. A memorial to him was created in Grass Valley's downtown area.
- Joanna Newsom, an American multi-instrumentalist, singer-songwriter, and actress. Born and raised in Northern California, Newsom was classically trained on the harp in her youth, and began her musical career as a keyboardist in the San Francisco-based indie band The Pleased.

== See also ==
- List of school districts in Nevada County, California
- National Register of Historic Places listings in Nevada County, California
