= Nevada Joint Union High School District =

School district in California, United States

Address
- 11645 Ridge Road Grass Valley, California; United States

District information
- Type: Public
- Superintendent: Dan Frisella
- NCES District ID: 0626880

Students and staff
- Students: 2,492 (2020–2021)
- Teachers: 127.15 (FTE)
- Staff: 157.5 (FTE)
- Student–teacher ratio: 19.6:1

Other information
- Website: www.njuhsd.com

The Nevada Joint Union High School District is a high school district in western Nevada County, California, near Sacramento.

A portion of Yuba County is in this district only for high school grades.

The superintendent is Dan Frisella. It is located at 11645 Ridge Road. Its schools include Bear River High School, Nevada Union High School, Ghidotti Early College High School, Silver Springs High School, North Point Academy and Nevada County Adult Education. It has an attendance of about 2,500 students.
