= Josiah Royce bibliography =

The works of American philosopher Josiah Royce (November 20, 1855 – September 14, 1916) include magazine articles, book reviews, other occasional writings, and several books.

== Works ==
Title	Date	First publisher	Notes
Primer of Logical Analysis	1881	A.L. Bancroft and Company	
The Religious Aspect of Philosophy	1885	Houghton, Mifflin and Company	
California: A Study of American Character	1886	Houghton, Mifflin and Company	
The Feud of Oakfield Creek	1887	Houghton, Mifflin and Company	
The Spirit of Modern Philosophy	1892	Houghton, Mifflin and Company	
The Conception of God	1897	The Macmillan Company	
Studies of Good and Evil	1898	D. Appleton & Company	
The World and the Individual	1900–1901	The Macmillan Company	The Gifford Lectures delivered at the University of Aberdeen. The first series was given between January 11 and February 1, 1899; the second, in January 1900.
The Conception of Immortality	1900	Houghton, Mifflin and Company	The Ingersoll Lecture for 1899, delivered at Harvard.
Outlines of Psychology	1903	The Macmillan Company	
Herbert Spencer: An Estimate and Review	1904	Fox, Duffield & Co.	
The Philosophy of Loyalty	1908	The Macmillan Company	
Race Questions, Provincialisms and Other American Problems	1908	The Macmillan & Company	
William James and Other Essays on the Philosophy of Life	1911	The Macmillan Company	
The Sources of Religious Insight	1912	Charles Scribner's Sons	The Bross Lectures delivered at Lake Forest College, November 13 to 19, 1911.
The Problem of Christianity	1913	The Macmillan Company	Lectures delivered before the Lowell Institute in Boston and on the Hibbert Foundation at Manchester College, Oxford.
War and Insurance	1914	The Macmillan Company	

=== Posthumous ===
Title	Date	First publisher	Notes
The Hope of the Great Community	1916	The Macmillan Company	Royce died while this book was in the press.
Lectures on Modern idealism	1919	Yale University Press	Edited with an introduction by Jacob Lowenberg.
Fugitive Essays	1920	Harvard University Press	Edited with an introduction by Jacob Lowenberg. Another edition was published by Books for Libraries Press in 1968.
Royce's Logical Essays	1951	W.C. Brown Company	
Josiah Royce's Seminar 1913-1914	1963	Rutgers University Press	Edited with an essay on the philosophy of Royce by Richard Hocking.
Josiah Royce's Late Writings	2001	Thoemmes Press	Edited with an introduction by Frank M. Oppenheim.

== Articles ==
Title	Publication date	First published in	Notes
"The Modern Novel as a Mode of Conveying Instruction and Accomplishing Reform"	April 1874	The Berkeleyan	
"Literary Education"	May 1874	The Berkeleyan	
"The Prince of Denmark"	August 1874	The Berkeleyan	
"The Aim of Poetry"	June 1875	The Overland Monthly	
"The Intention of Prometheus Bound of Æschylus"	April 1875	Bulletin of the University of California	Bachelor of Arts thesis, dated April 29, 1875.
"The Life-Harmony"	August 1875	The Overland Monthly	
"On a Passage in Sophocles"	1875	Oakland Daily Transcript	Oration delivered during commencement ceremonies at the University of California, June 9, 1875.
"Truth in Art"	1875	Oakland Daily News	
"The Circulating Library"	1878	The Berkeleyan	
"A Monkish Chronicle"	1878	The Berkeleyan	
"Schiller's Ethical Studies"	1878	The Journal of Speculative Philosophy	
"Natural Rights and Spinoza's Essay on Liberty"	1880	The Berkeley Quarterly	
"Shelley and the Revolution"	1880	The Californian	
"Before and Since Kant"	1881	The Berkeley Quarterly	
"The Decay of Earnestness"	1881	The Californian	
"Doubting and Working"	1881	The Californian	
"George Elliot as a Religious Teacher"	1881	The Californian	
"Kant's Relation to Modern Philosophy Progress"	1881	The Journal of Speculative Philosophy	
"'Mind-Stuff' and Reality"	1881	Mind	For a reply see F.W. Frankland, "Prof. Royce on 'Mind-Stuff'".
"Pessimism and Modern Thought"	1881	The Berkeley Quarterly	
"How Beliefs are Made"	1882	The Californian	
"Mind and Reality"	1882	Mind	
"The Freedom of Teaching"	1883	The Overland Monthly	
"After-images"	1884	Science	Comments on Sidney Hodges' article "After-images."
"The Squatter Riot of '50 in Sacramento"	1885	The Overland Monthly	Reprinted with a new introduction in Studies of Good and Evil as "An Episode of Early California Life: The Squatter Riot of 1850 in Sacramento."
"Tennyson and Pessimism"	January 1887	The Harvard Monthly	
"The Practical Value of Philosophy"	1889	The Ethical Record	
"Reflections after a Wandering Life in Australasia"	May 1889	The Atlantic Monthly	
"Reflections after a Wandering Life in Australasia"	June 1889	The Atlantic Monthly	Second paper.
"Frémont"	1890	The Atlantic Monthly	
"Light on the Seizure of California"	1890	The Century Magazine	
"A Neglected Study"	1890	The Harvard Monthly	
"The Outlook in Ethics"	1891	The International Journal of Ethics	
"Present Ideals of American University Life"	1891	Scribner's Magazine	
"Two Philosophers of the Paradoxical: Hegel"	January 1891	The Atlantic Monthly	
"Two Philosophers of the Paradoxical: Schopenhauer"	February 1891	The Atlantic Monthly	
"The Implications of Self-Consciousness"	1892	The New World	
"The Knowledge of Good and Evil"	1893	International Journal of Ethics	
"The External World and the Social Consciousness"	1894	The Philosophical Review	
"Natural Law, Ethics, and Evolution"	1895	International Journal of Ethics,	
"Self-Consciousness, Social Consciousness and Nature. I"	1895	The Philosophical Review	
"Self-Consciousness, Social Consciousness and Nature. II"	1895	The Philosophical Review	
"What Should be the Attitude of Teachers of Philosophy Towards Religion?"	1903	International Journal of Ethics	
"The Eternal and the Practical"	1904	The Philosophical Review	
"The Relation of the Principles of Logic to the Foundations of Geometry"	1905	Transactions of the American Mathematical Society	
"The Present State of the Question regarding the First Principles of Theoretical Science"	1906	Proceedings of the American Philosophical Society	
"What is Vital in Christianity?"	1909	The Harvard Theological Review	
"The Present State of the Question regarding the First Principles of Theoretical Science"	1906	Proceedings of the American Philosophical Society	
"The Reality of the Temporal"	1910	International Journal of Ethics	
"George Fox as a Mystic"	1913	The Harvard Theological Review	
"Charles Sanders Peirce" (with Fergus Kernan)	1916	The Journal of Philosophy, Psychology, and Scientific Methods	

== Book reviews ==
Title	Publication date	First published in	Notes
"Draper's Religion and Science"	February 1875	The Berkeleyan	Review of John William Draper, The History of the Conflict between Religion and Science.
"Some Recent Studies on Ideas of Motion"	1883	Science	Review of Salomon Stricker, Studien über die bewegungs Vorstellungen.
"Coues's Biogen"	1884	Science	Review of Elliott Coues, Biogen: A Speculation on the Origin and Nature of Life.
"Martineau's Types of Ethical Theory"	1885	The Nation	Review of James Martineau, Types of Ethical Theory.
"Thompson's Psychology"	1885	The Nation	Review of Daniel Greenleaf Thompson, A System of Psychology.
"Abbot's Scientific Theism"	1886	Science	Review of Francis Ellingwood Abbot, Scientific Theism. Abbot's reply to this review can be found in the preface to the third edition of his book.
"Bancroft and Hittell on California"	1886	The Nation	Review of Theodore H. Hittell, History of California (vol. 2); and Hubert Howe Bancroft, History of the Pacific States of North America (vol. 16).
"Philosophical Questions of the Day"	1886	Science	Review of Eduard von Hartmann, Philosophische fragen der gegenwart.
"Two Recent Books upon California History"	1886	The Nation	Review of Theodore H. Hittell, History of California (vol. 1); and Hubert Howe Bancroft, History of the Pacific States of North America (vols. 19 and 20).
"Brancoft's Conquest of California"	1887	The Nation	Review of Hubert Howe Bancroft, History of the Pacific States of North America (vol. 17).
"Dr. Abbott's 'Way Out of Agnosticism'"	1890	The International Journal of Ethics	Review of Francis Ellingwood Abbot, The Way Out of Agnosticism. Abbot eventually responded with Professor Royce's Libel in which he sought redress from Royce's employer Harvard University. The debate moved to the pages of The Nation, where Charles Sanders Peirce took Abbot's side; William James less so. Royce's attorney, Joseph Bangs Warner, also contributed to this debate.
"Salter's Ethical Religion"	1890	The Nation	Review of William Mackintire Salter, Ethical Religion.
"A New Study of Psychology"	1891	The International Journal of Ethics	Review of William James, The Principles of Psychology.
"Notes on Current Periodic Literature"	1891	The International Journal of Ethics	Comments on current issues of the Monist, Archiv für Geschichte der Philosophie, and Philosophische Studien.
Untitled	July 1891	The International Journal of Ethics	Review of Robert B. Fairbairn, On the Doctrine of Morality in its Relation to the Grace of Redemption.
Untitled	July 1891	The International Journal of Ethics	Review of John Dewey, Outlines of a Critical Theory of Ethics.
Untitled	October 1891	The International Journal of Ethics	Review of Herbert Spencer, Justice: Being Part IV. of the Principles of Ethics.

== Other works ==
- "Two Days in Life's Woods," The Overland Monthly, Vol. I, Second series, 1883, pp. 594–595 (A poem).
- "Preliminary Report of the Committee on Apparitions and Haunted Houses," Proceedings of the American Society for Psychical Research, Vol. I, 1886, pp. 128–129.
- "Report of the Committee on Phantasms and Presentiments," Proceedings of the American Society for Psychical Research, Vol. I, 1889, pp. 350–428.
- The Letters of Josiah Royce. Chicago: University of Chicago Press, 1970.
