= William Ernest Hocking =

American philosopher (1873–1966)

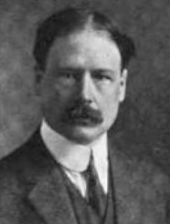
- Born: August 10, 1873; Cleveland, Ohio, U.S.
- Died: June 12, 1966 (aged 92); Madison, New Hampshire, U.S.
- Children: Richard Hocking

Education
- Education: Harvard University
- Doctoral advisor: Josiah Royce
- Other advisors: Edmund Husserl; William James

Philosophical work
- Era: Contemporary philosophy
- Region: Western philosophy
- School: Objective idealism American idealism Pragmatism
- Institutions: Harvard University
- Notable students: Charles Hartshorne
- Main interests: Metaphysics
- Notable ideas: Negative pragmatism

William Ernest Hocking (August 10, 1873 – June 12, 1966) was an American idealist philosopher at Harvard University. He continued the work of his philosophical teacher Josiah Royce (the founder of American idealism) in revising idealism to integrate and fit into empiricism, naturalism and pragmatism.

He said that metaphysics has to make inductions from experience: "That which does not work is not true." His major field of study was the philosophy of religion, but his 22 books included discussions of philosophy and human rights, world politics, freedom of the press, the philosophical psychology of human nature; education; and more.

In 1958 he served as president of the Metaphysical Society of America. He led a highly influential study of missions in mainline Protestant churches in 1932. His "Laymen's Inquiry" recommended a greater emphasis on education and social welfare, transfer of power to local groups, less reliance on evangelizing and conversion, and a much more respectful appreciation for local religions.

== Early life and education ==
William Ernest Hocking was born in 1873 to William Hocking (1839–1903) and Julia Pratt (1848–1936) in Cleveland, Ohio. He was of Cornish American heritage. He attended public schools through high school. He worked first as a mapmaker, illustrator and printer's devil, before entering Iowa State College of Agriculture and Mechanical Arts in 1894, where he intended to be an engineer. Reading William James' work The Principles of Psychology made him decide to go to Harvard to study philosophy, but he first worked for four years as a teacher and high school principal to earn the money for his studies.

In 1899 he entered Harvard, where he also studied with Josiah Royce in philosophy, earning his master's degree in 1901. From 1902 to 1903 he studied in Germany, at Göttingen, where he was the first American to study with Edmund Husserl, and in Berlin and Heidelberg. He returned to Harvard and completed his PhD in 1904.

== Career ==
Hocking began teaching as an instructor in comparative religion at Andover Theological Seminary. In 1906 he and his wife moved to the West Coast, where he joined the philosophy faculty at the University of California, Berkeley, under George Howison. In 1908 he was called to Yale, where he served as an assistant professor and published his first major work, The Meaning of God in Human Experience (1912).

In 1914 Hocking returned to Harvard, where he eventually became Alford Professor of Natural Religion, Moral Philosophy and Civil Polity. During World War I, in 1917 he was among the first American civil engineers to reach the front in France. In 1918 he was appointed as an inspector of "war issues" courses in army training camps. His experience led him to write his second book, about morale. Returning to Harvard after the war, Hocking made the rest of his career there. He was elected to the American Academy of Arts and Sciences in 1921. From 1920 to the late-1930s, Hocking was a regular lecturer at the Naval War College in Newport, Rhode Island, where he lectured on "Morale," "Psychology," and "Leadership." Influenced by his visit to China, Hocking published a characteristically open minded study of the twelfth-century Chinese philosopher Zhu Xi. He argued that Zhu Xi's thought was "scientific," which not all European philosophers could claim, and therefore had something to teach westerners about democracy.

In 1936, Hocking was invited to give the Hibbert Lectures at Oxford and Cambridge universities in England. These reflected his thinking about the relation of Christianity to other world religions, as he had begun to support a universal religion. According to a review in TIME of the book containing his lectures, Hocking thought the important elements were

a belief in obligation, in a source of things which is good, in some kind of permanence for what is real in selfhood, and in the human aspect of deity." He pins his hope more on the common people throughout the world than on the theologians, finds in them a "universal sense of the presence of God, and the intuition of the direction in which the will of God lies.

Hocking was elected to the American Philosophical Society in 1943. That same year, he retired to Madison, New Hampshire and lived there until his death 23 years later.

== Study of missions ==
In 1930–1932, he led the Commission of Appraisal, which studied the foreign mission work of six Protestant denominations in India, Burma, China, and Japan. Protestant missionaries had been doing evangelistic work in Asia since the nineteenth century, but several groups noted falling donations and nationalistic resistance, suggesting that changes might be needed.

The commission's report, entitled Re-Thinking Missions: A Laymen's Inquiry after One Hundred Years (1932) and known as the "Hocking report," reflected changing ideas about the role of western missionaries in other cultures, and generated fierce debate. Commission members traveled to Asian cities to meet missionaries and local people. While in China, Hocking consulted with Pearl S. Buck, who was developing a similar critique of missions and who later threw her support behind the commission's report. The Commission recommended a greater emphasis on education and welfare, transfer of power to local groups, less reliance on evangelizing, with respectful appreciation for local religions. A recommended related goal was the transition of local leadership and institutions. The commission also recommended reorganization in the US to coordinate and focus missionary efforts by creating a single organization for Protestant missions.

== Philosophical work ==
In political philosophy, Hocking claimed that liberalism must be superseded by a new form of individualism in which the principle is: "every man shall be a whole man." He believed that humans have only one natural right: "an individual should develop the powers that are in him." The most important freedom is "the freedom to perfect one's freedom." He considered Christianity to be a great agent in the making of world civilization. But he believed that no dogma was the route to religious knowledge; rather, it is developed in the context of individual human experience.

He followed many German philosophers of his time, who were very influential. While studying in Germany, he had attended lectures by Wilhelm Dilthey, Paul Natorp, Edmund Husserl, Wilhelm Windelband and Heinrich Rickert. A staunch defender of idealism in the United States, Hocking was critical to thought about its meaning for "religion," "history" or the "superpersonal." In many regards he agreed with Wilhelm Luetgert, a German critic of idealism; however, he did not abandon his position. Hocking believed nothing that "could be" was ultimately irrational. He declared that there was no unknowable in "what was."

=== Negative pragmatism ===
Perhaps Hocking's most important contribution to philosophy is "negative pragmatism," which means that what "works" pragmatically might or might not be true, but what does not work must be false. As Sahakian and Sahakian state, "... if an idea does not work, then it cannot possibly be true, for the reason that the truth always works ...". Not only is this a criterion of truth, but it is a definition. It stipulates that truth is a constant – "truth always works". The Sahakian analysis indicates that what we may think is true might be only an illusion – "what appears to be working may or may not be true". As an example, to say that the sun is rising or setting, though seemingly true visually, is false because the appearance is due to the motion of the earth, not the sun moving up or down in relation to the earth. This illusion caused ancients to falsely believe in a geocentric universe rather than the currently accepted heliocentric view.

Hocking's criterion was corroborated in the mid-20th century by Richard Feynman, a physicist who won the Nobel Prize. Feynman states that anything described as true "... could never be proved right, because tomorrow's experiment might succeed in proving wrong what you thought was right ..." and, "... if it disagrees with experiment, it is wrong." Finally, Sahakian and Sahakian note inadequacies and limited application to all of the other criteria of truth they present, but they do not denigrate negative pragmatism. To find an inadequacy in any criterion is to invoke negative pragmatism. To denote a failure in any criterion is to show how it "disagrees with experiment" (Feynman) and/or "does not work" (Hocking). By this means, they use negative pragmatism as the de facto criterion by which all other criteria are judged.

== Marriage and family ==
Hocking married Agnes O'Reilly on June 28, 1905. She was the Irish-American daughter of the journalist and poet John Boyle O'Reilly and his wife Mary Murphy, also a journalist. They had three children: Richard (1906–2001), Hester (1909–1998) and Joan (1911–2000). After they returned to Cambridge, Agnes Hocking started an open-air school at their home, which she developed as the Shady Hill School. It continues near Harvard Square.

Richard became a professor of philosophy and his sister Hester became affiliated with the St Augustine movement for civil rights and in April 1964 Hester along with three other woman (including Mary Parkman Peabody the mother of then Massachusetts governor Endicott Peabody) were arrested for protesting in a segregated lunch bar in the town, the event made front-page news at the time. Joan's husband Edward A. Kracke Jr. was a historian of China.

== Final years and death ==
In 1955 Hocking's wife of 50 years Agnes died at the age of 78; the following year Hocking published his final book The Coming World Civilisation.

On June 12, 1966, Hocking died at his farm in Madison, New Hampshire aged 92. He was survived by his three children and eight grandchildren.

== Cultural references ==
William Hocking's life, work, his predecessors, his colleagues, and especially his surviving personal library, West Wind, is the inspiration for John Kaag's American Philosophy: A Love Story.

== Selected works ==
- 1912, The Meaning of God in Human Experience, online text at Internet Archive. The book went through 14 editions.
- 1918, Morale and Its Enemies, online text at Internet Archive
- 1926, Man and the State, Yale University Press
- 1929, Types of Philosophy, (NY: Charles Scribner and Sons). This book went through three editions.
- 1932, William Ernest Hocking, Re-Thinking Missions: A Laymen's Inquiry After One Hundred Years (report of Commission of Appraisal), online electronic text at Internet Archive
- 1938, Living Religions and a World Faith, publication of his 1936 Hibbert Lectures at Oxford and Cambridge in England.
- 1956, The Coming World Civilisation, which Hocking described as "a conspectus of a life's thought," was still in print in the 1980s.

== See also ==
- American philosophy
- List of American philosophers
