= Sarah Royce =

American pioneer, teacher, and writer (1819–1891)

Sarah Eleanor Bayliss Royce (March 2, 1819 – November 23, 1891) was an American writer, teacher and pioneer. She and her family set out for California in 1848 as part of the gold rush. Her autobiographical account of the journey was published as A Frontier Lady: Recollections of the Gold Rush and Early California. Her son was the philosopher Josiah Royce.

== Biography ==
Sarah Eleanor Bayliss was born on March 2, 1819, in Stratford-upon-Avon, England to Mary T. and Benjamin Bayliss. Her family moved to America when she was six weeks old, settling in Rochester, New York. She attended the Phipps Union Female Seminary in Albion.

Sarah married fellow English immigrant Josiah Royce in 1847. They had a daughter, Mary, and set out towards California in 1848. They reached Iowa in April 1849 and were among many others travelling west as part of the California Gold Rush. They started their journey as part of a wagon train, but lagged behind as they stopped on Sundays to observe the Sabbath. Royce was a member of the Disciples of Christ, a group committed to restoring primitive Christianity. By October 1849 they were in the desert west of the Great Salt Lake. They reached the Carson River and embarked for the Sierra Nevada mountain range. They were discovered by a relief expedition organized by the government that assisted them in traversing the mountain passes before the snows closed them off.

Upon their arrival in California, Josiah Royce attempted to make a living by mining. They had three more children, Hattie, Ruth, and Josiah Jr. The family lived in Grass Valley for twelve years where Sarah taught school out of their home. They then moved to San Francisco. Josiah Sr. died in 1889. Sarah returned east for one year before returning to California and living with her daughter Ruth in San Jose.

Based on diary entries she had kept from the journey west, Royce wrote the book Pilgrimage Diary 30 years later, intending it for her son Josiah Royce, who became a philosopher and taught at Harvard University. The autobiographical work chronicled her family's journey to California during the gold rush. It was republished in 1932 as A Frontier Lady: Recollections of the Gold Rush and Early California.

On November 23, 1891, Royce died of "nervous shock" after being knocked against the wall of a post office. She was 72.
