= Senator Watt =

Senator Watt may refer to:

- Alexander Watt (politician) (1834–1914), Washington State Senate
- Mel Watt (born 1945), North Carolina State Senate
- William Watt (miner) (1828–1878), California State Senate

== See also ==
- Senator Watts (disambiguation)
