= Senator Watts =

Senator Watts may refer to:

- A. D. Watts (1867–1927), North Carolina State Senate
- Cornelius Clarkson Watts (1848–1930), West Virginia State Senate
- Eugene J. Watts (1942–2008), Ohio State Senate

== See also ==
- Senator Watt (disambiguation)
