= Grass Valley, California =

City in California, United States

- City
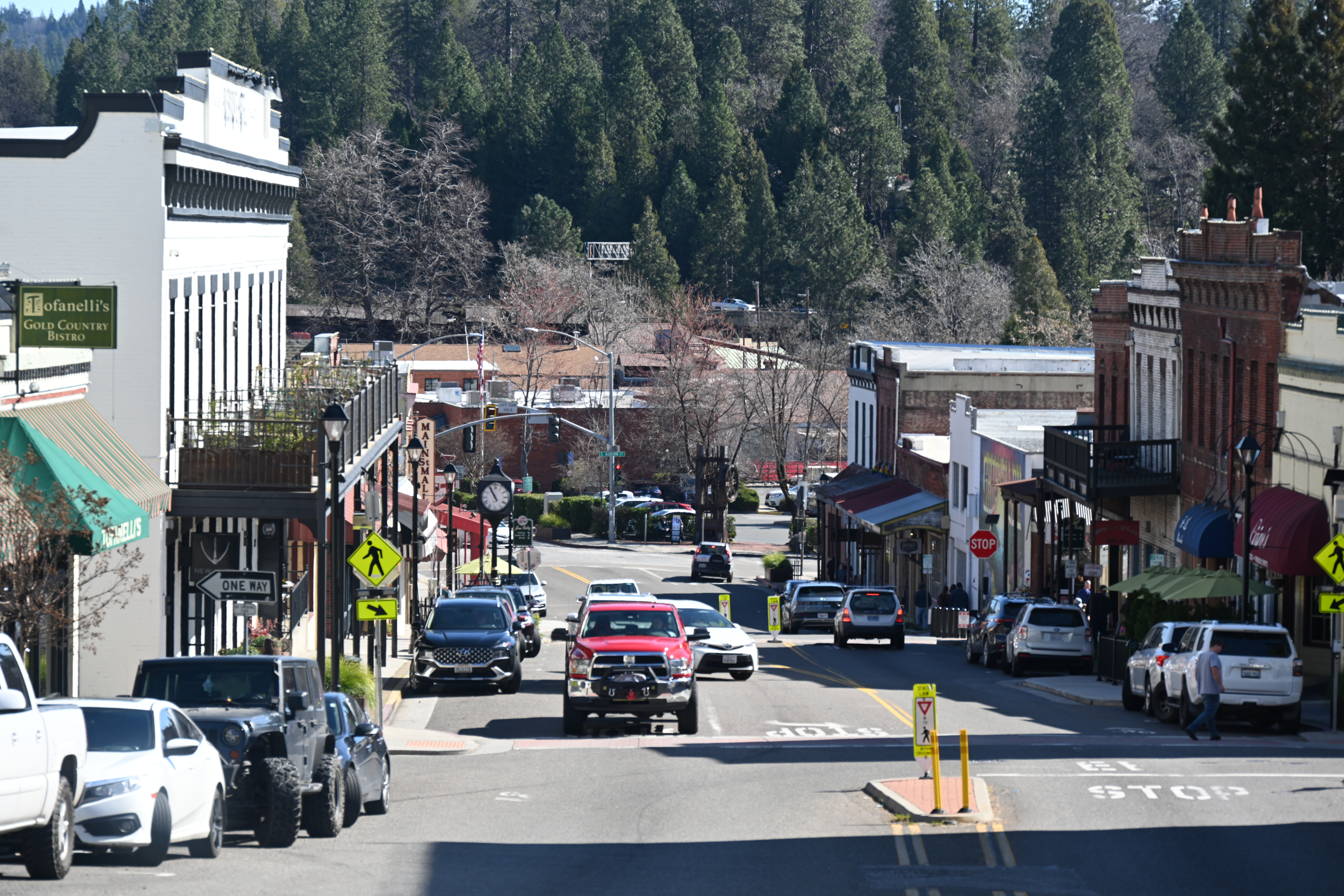
- Grass Valley (2025)
- Interactive map of Grass Valley, California
- Location in the United States
- Coordinates: 39°13′9″N 121°3′30″W
- Country: United States
- State: California
- County: Nevada
- Incorporated: March 13, 1893

Area
  - Total: 5.25 sq mi (13.59 km^{2})
  - Land: 5.25 sq mi (13.59 km^{2})
  - Water: 0 sq mi (0.00 km^{2}) 0%
- Elevation: 2,411 ft (735 m)

Population (2020)
  - Total: 14,016
  - Density: 2,671/sq mi (1,031/km^{2})
- Time zone: UTC−8 (Pacific (PST))
  - Summer (DST): UTC−7 (PDT)
- ZIP Codes: 95945, 95949
- Area code: 530, 837
- FIPS code: 06-30798
- GNIS feature IDs: 277525, 2410651
- Website: www.grassvalleyca.gov

Grass Valley is a city in Nevada County, California, United States. As of the 2020 United States census, its population was 14,016. Situated at roughly 2,500 feet (760 m) in elevation in the western foothills of the Sierra Nevada mountain range, this northern Gold Country city is 57 miles (92 km) by car from Sacramento and 88 miles (142 km) west of Reno.

== History ==
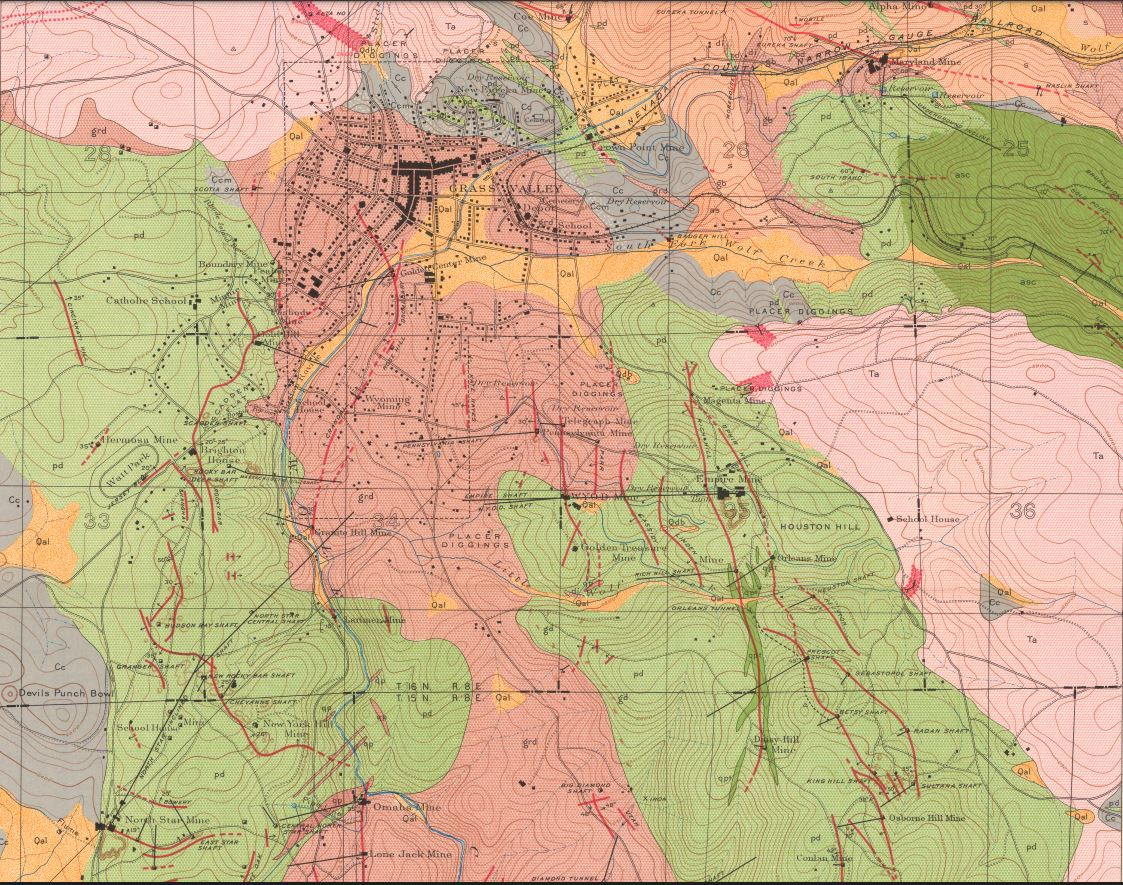
Grass Valley geological map, and the location of the North Star, Empire, and Maryland mines

Grass Valley, which was originally known as Boston Ravine and later named Centerville, dates from the California Gold Rush, as does nearby Nevada City. Gold was discovered at Gold Hill in October 1850 and population grew around the mine. When a post office was established in 1851, it was renamed Grass Valley the next year for unknown reasons. The town was incorporated in 1860.

The essential history of Grass Valley mining belongs to the Grass Valley Mining District's main mines—the North Star, Empire, and Idaho-Maryland—for continuous production over a span of years. From 1868 until 1900, the Idaho-Maryland mine was the most productive in the district. From 1900 until 1925, the North Star and the Empire produced the most gold in the county. In 1932, the Empire and North Star were physically connected at the 4600-foot level and 5300-foot level.

Grass Valley has the Empire Mine and North Star Mine, two of California's richest mines. George Starr, manager of the Empire Mine, and William Bowers Bourn II, the owner, donated mine property which became Memorial Park. Wiliam Bourn Jr. had taken over management of the Empire Mine in 1878 after his father's death, replacing water power with steam. In 1884, Bourn purchased and rejuvenated the North Star mine. The Idaho and Maryland mines were consolidated by Samuel P. Dorsey in 1893. In 1925, Errol MacBoyle acquired the Idaho-Maryland. By 1938, the Idaho-Maryland was the second largest gold producer in the country. However, gold mining operations in the area ended during WWII, due to War Production Board Limitation Order 208. After the war, renewed operations were attempted, but according to Gage McKinney, "by the mid-1950s mining was no longer profitable in what had been the richest gold mining district in California."

Many of those who came to settle in Grass Valley were tin miners from Cornwall, United Kingdom. Most arrived between 1860 and 1895, composing three quarters of Grass Valley's population.

After the Civil War ended and news of death of President Lincoln many in the town rejoiced. When these acts of celebration were heard by 1st Battalion of Native Cavalry they sent out a detachment of 25 men. Commanded by Second Lieutenant M. E. Jimenez, the detachment rode into town and got into a skirmish with 10 locals. Two troopers were wounded in the action. The soldiers arrested all 10 of the rebels and took them to Camp Low.

Grass Valley still holds on to its Cornish heritage, with events such as its annual Cornish Christmas and St. Piran's Day celebrations. Cornish pasties are a local favorite dish with a few restaurants in town specializing in recipes handed down from the original immigrant generation. Grass Valley is also twinned with Bodmin in Cornwall (UK).

There was formerly a (short-lived) Roman Catholic Diocese of Grass Valley in 1868–1884, later relocated in Sacramento (and now a titular see).

The Grass Valley Kmart store, opened in 1981, was the last remaining location in California at the time that it closed in 2021. It is now a Target department store.

== Geography ==
According to the United States Census Bureau, the city has an area of 4.7 square miles (12 km^{2}), all of it land.

A variety of igneous and metamorphic rock supports Grass Valley. Granitic rock such as quartz diorite underlies the downtown core and extends south along Highway 49. Metavolcanic rock and diabase underlie areas around the granitic zone. Neighborhoods around Nevada County Golf Course and Sierra Nevada Memorial Hospital are underlain by ultramafic rock which supports infertile soils of the Dubakella series. Here the vegetation is sparse considering the high average annual precipitation, with much grassland, and forested areas are often dominated by several species of oaks and the crooked, thin-crowned gray pine. Luxuriant forest dominated by straight, dense ponderosa pine inhabits the more fertile soils, which include Musick series on granitic rock and Sites series on mafic or metamorphic rock.

=== Climate ===
Grass Valley has a hot-summer Mediterranean climate (Köppen Csa) with warm to hot, dry summers and wet, cool, rainy winters. Summer is very dry, but thunderstorms may occur. Rainfall averages over 50 inches (1,300 mm) per year, in extreme contrast with the semi-arid valley below, which average as low as 12 inches (300 mm) in some parts. The high rainfall also gives the area green vegetation typical of an oceanic climate. This contributes to a heavy fuel-loading of brush and grass, which dry out during the near-rainless summer, posing a wildfire hazard.

Winters are cool but rarely cold. There are at least one or more snow events per year, often in the late winter. Frequent and large disruptive winter storms occur some years, while other years may have little to no snow. Less marine influence means that snow tends to occur more irregularly than some communities at similar elevation nearby to the south, such as Pollock Pines.

Over the course of a year, 36.4 days of 90 °F (32 °C) or hotter and 0.9 days of 100 °F (38 °C) or hotter occur, with 61.4 days with minimum of 32 °F (0 °C) or colder.

Climate data for Grass Valley, California, 1991–2020 normals, extremes 1966–present
Month	Jan	Feb	Mar	Apr	May	Jun	Jul	Aug	Sep	Oct	Nov	Dec	Year
Record high °F (°C)	77 (25)	81 (27)	82 (28)	88 (31)	99 (37)	102 (39)	108 (42)	108 (42)	108 (42)	97 (36)	87 (31)	80 (27)	108 (42)
Mean maximum °F (°C)	67.0 (19.4)	69.1 (20.6)	72.6 (22.6)	79.0 (26.1)	85.8 (29.9)	93.9 (34.4)	97.8 (36.6)	96.9 (36.1)	93.9 (34.4)	85.9 (29.9)	75.3 (24.1)	66.3 (19.1)	99.8 (37.7)
Mean daily maximum °F (°C)	53.6 (12.0)	54.9 (12.7)	57.9 (14.4)	62.7 (17.1)	70.8 (21.6)	80.2 (26.8)	88.0 (31.1)	87.4 (30.8)	82.3 (27.9)	72.1 (22.3)	59.8 (15.4)	52.6 (11.4)	68.5 (20.3)
Daily mean °F (°C)	43.4 (6.3)	44.5 (6.9)	47.5 (8.6)	51.3 (10.7)	58.8 (14.9)	66.4 (19.1)	73.1 (22.8)	72.1 (22.3)	67.2 (19.6)	58.2 (14.6)	48.4 (9.1)	42.6 (5.9)	56.1 (13.4)
Mean daily minimum °F (°C)	33.1 (0.6)	34.2 (1.2)	37.0 (2.8)	40.0 (4.4)	46.8 (8.2)	52.6 (11.4)	58.2 (14.6)	56.8 (13.8)	52.1 (11.2)	44.2 (6.8)	37.1 (2.8)	32.6 (0.3)	43.7 (6.5)
Mean minimum °F (°C)	24.4 (−4.2)	26.0 (−3.3)	28.1 (−2.2)	30.4 (−0.9)	36.9 (2.7)	43.3 (6.3)	50.8 (10.4)	50.3 (10.2)	43.7 (6.5)	34.9 (1.6)	28.0 (−2.2)	23.7 (−4.6)	21.7 (−5.7)
Record low °F (°C)	15 (−9)	9 (−13)	19 (−7)	26 (−3)	27 (−3)	36 (2)	40 (4)	41 (5)	35 (2)	27 (−3)	19 (−7)	3 (−16)	3 (−16)
Average precipitation inches (mm)	9.30 (236)	8.98 (228)	8.16 (207)	4.43 (113)	2.48 (63)	0.74 (19)	0.00 (0.00)	0.11 (2.8)	0.44 (11)	2.56 (65)	5.52 (140)	10.48 (266)	53.20 (1,351)
Average snowfall inches (cm)	0.7 (1.8)	3.0 (7.6)	3.0 (7.6)	0.5 (1.3)	0.0 (0.0)	0.0 (0.0)	0.0 (0.0)	0.0 (0.0)	0.0 (0.0)	0.0 (0.0)	0.2 (0.51)	1.2 (3.0)	8.6 (21.81)
Average precipitation days (≥ 0.01 in)	12.8	11.7	12.2	8.5	5.9	2.7	0.2	0.8	1.6	4.4	8.4	12.3	81.5
Average snowy days (≥ 0.1 in)	0.3	1.0	1.0	0.3	0.0	0.0	0.0	0.0	0.0	0.0	0.1	0.3	3.0
Source 1: NOAA
Source 2: National Weather Service

== Demographics ==
Historical population
Census	Pop.	Note	%±
1900	4,719		—
1910	4,520		−4.2%
1920	4,006		−11.4%
1930	3,817		−4.7%
1940	5,701		49.4%
1950	5,283		−7.3%
1960	4,876		−7.7%
1970	5,149		5.6%
1980	6,697		30.1%
1990	9,048		35.1%
2000	10,922		20.7%
2010	12,860		17.7%
2020	14,016		9.0%
U.S. Decennial Census

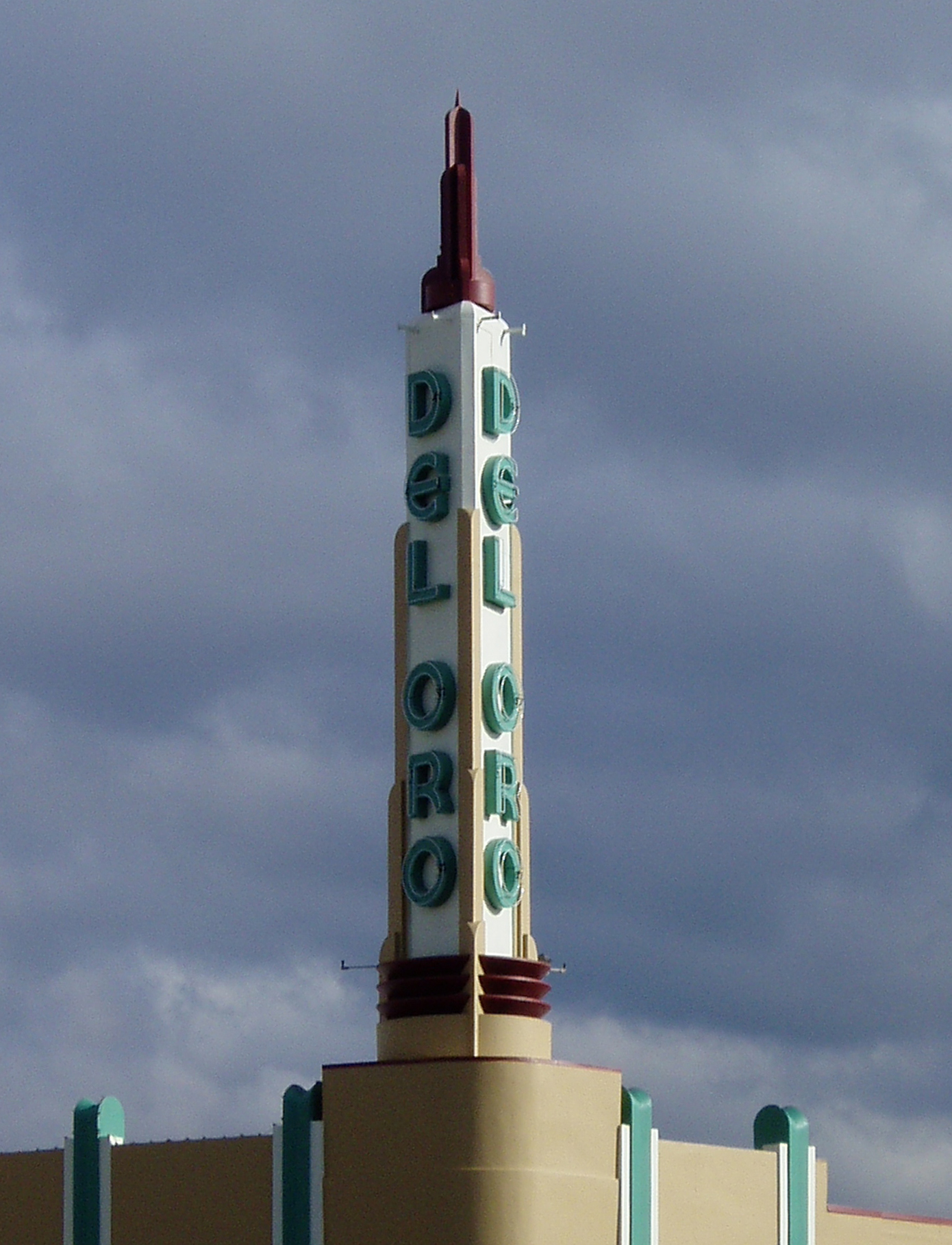
The iconic spire of the Del Oro Theatre

=== 2020 census ===
As of the 2020 census, Grass Valley had a population of 14,016 and a population density of 2,670.2 inhabitants per square mile (1,031.0/km^{2}). The median age was 47.5 years; 17.6% of residents were under the age of 18, 6.7% were aged 18 to 24, 23.6% were aged 25 to 44, 21.6% were aged 45 to 64, and 30.5% were 65 years of age or older. For every 100 females, there were 81.2 males, and for every 100 females age 18 and over there were 77.3 males age 18 and over.

The census reported that 91.7% of residents lived in households, 2.4% lived in non-institutionalized group quarters, and 5.9% were institutionalized. 100.0% of residents lived in urban areas, while 0.0% lived in rural areas.

There were 6,301 households, of which 23.2% had children under the age of 18 living in them. Of all households, 26.7% were married-couple households, 8.1% were cohabiting couple households, 43.7% had a female householder with no partner present, and 21.4% had a male householder with no partner present. About 42.6% of households were made up of individuals, and 25.5% had someone living alone who was 65 years of age or older. The average household size was 2.04, and there were 3,056 families (48.5% of all households).

There were 6,716 housing units at an average density of 1,279.5 units per square mile (494.0 units/km^{2}). Of these, 6,301 units (93.8%) were occupied and 415 (6.2%) were vacant. Of occupied units, 41.3% were owner-occupied and 58.7% were renter-occupied. The homeowner vacancy rate was 2.1% and the rental vacancy rate was 3.7%.

Racial composition as of the 2020 census
Race	Number	Percent
White	11,308	80.7%
Black or African American	89	0.6%
American Indian and Alaska Native	195	1.4%
Asian	233	1.7%
Native Hawaiian and Other Pacific Islander	17	0.1%
Some other race	649	4.6%
Two or more races	1,525	10.9%
Hispanic or Latino (of any race)	1,728	12.3%

=== 2023 ACS 5-year estimates ===
In 2023, the US Census Bureau estimated that 8.3% of the population were foreign-born. Of all people aged 5 or older, 88.0% spoke only English at home, 5.0% spoke Spanish, 1.7% spoke other Indo-European languages, 2.2% spoke Asian or Pacific Islander languages, and 3.0% spoke other languages. Of those aged 25 or older, 92.2% were high school graduates and 32.0% had a bachelor's degree.

The median household income in 2023 was $48,850, and the per capita income was $34,832. About 19.4% of families and 20.7% of the population were below the poverty line.

=== 2010 census ===
The 2010 United States census reported that Grass Valley had a population of 12,860. The population density was 2,711.3 inhabitants per square mile (1,046.8/km^{2}). The racial makeup of Grass Valley was 11,493 (89.4%) White, 208 (1.6%) Native American, 188 (1.5%) Asian, 46 (0.4%) African American, 9 (0.1%) Pacific Islander, 419 (3.3%) from other races, and 497 (3.9%) from two or more races. Hispanics or Latinos of any race were 1,341 persons (10.4%).

The census reported that 12,401 people (96.4% of the population) lived in households, 118 (0.9%) lived in noninstitutionalized group quarters, and 341 (2.7%) were institutionalized.

Of the 6,077 households, 1,544 (25.4%) had children under the age of 18 living in them, 1,665 (27.4%) were opposite-sex married couples living together, 980 (16.1%) had a female householder with no husband present, and 316 (5.2%) had a male householder with no wife present, 466 (7.7%) were unmarried opposite-sex partnerships, and 33 (0.5%) were same-sex married couples or partnerships. About 2,605 households (42.9%) were made up of individuals, and 1,415 (23.3%) had someone living alone who was 65 years of age or older. The average household size was 2.04. The 2,961 families (48.7% of all households) had an average family size of 2.78.

The population was distributed as 2,625 people (20.4%) under the age of 18, 1,146 people (8.9%) aged 18 to 24, 2,882 people (22.4%) aged 25 to 44, 3,183 people (24.8%) aged 45 to 64, and 3,024 people (23.5%) who were 65 years of age or older. The median age was 43.2 years. For every 100 females, there were 78.9 males. For every 100 females age 18 and over, there were 73.5 males.

The 6,637 housing units averaged 1,399.3 per square mile (540.3/km^{2}), of which 2,391 (39.3%) were owner-occupied, and 3,686 (60.7%) were occupied by renters. The homeowner vacancy rate was 4.0%; the rental vacancy rate was 6.7%; 4,663 people (36.3% of the population) lived in owner-occupied housing units and 7,738 people (60.2%) lived in rental housing units.

== Economy ==
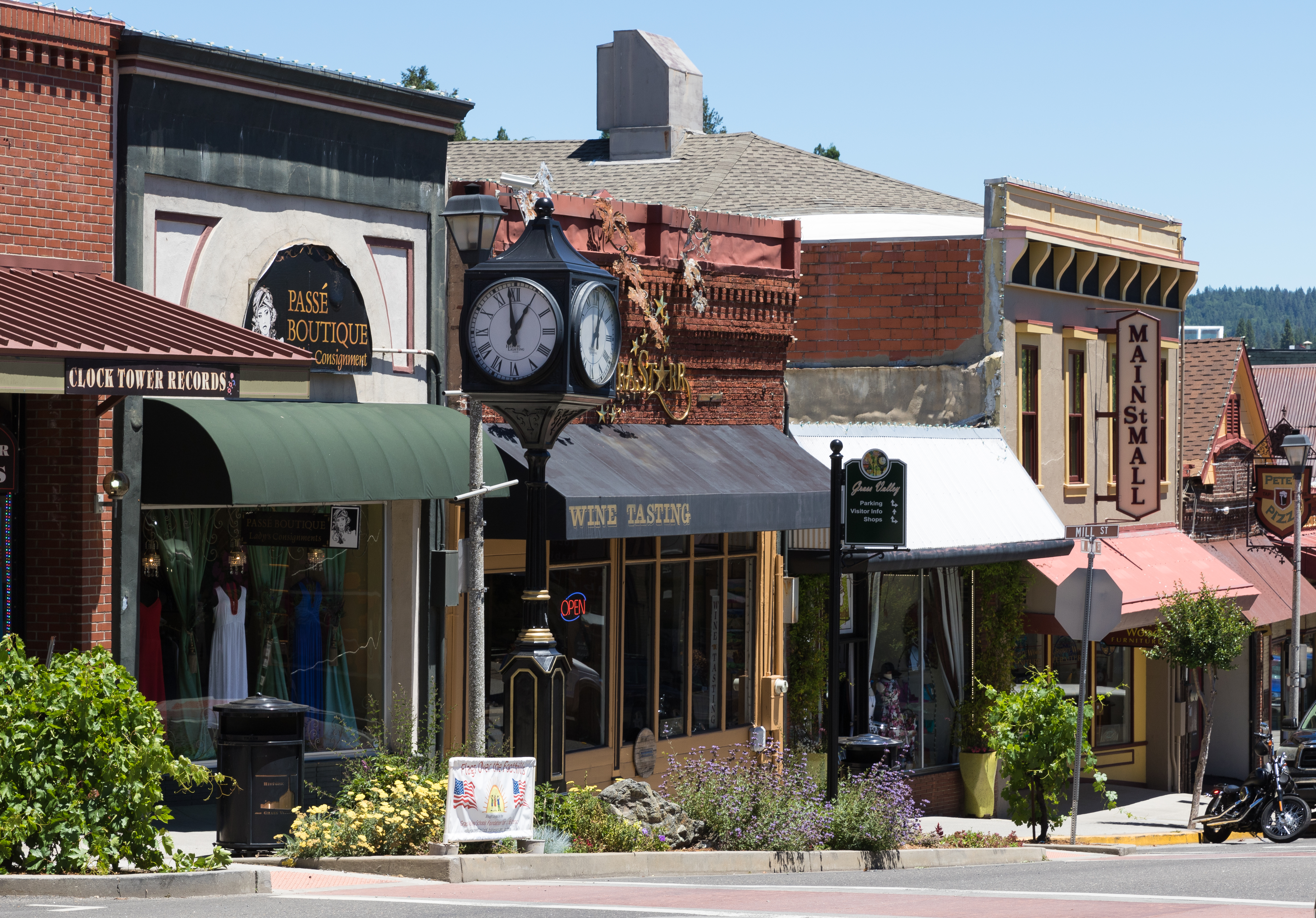
Shops on Main Street

The combined communities of Grass Valley and Nevada City have a fairly diversified economy. The Gold Rush days left a historical legacy and tourism and the related services sector constitute the bulk of the local economy. Nevada County is sometimes thought of as a bedroom community for families, with significant numbers of retirees. Those of working age often commute to Sacramento Valley cities to work, especially to job centers in Roseville, Yuba City, and Sacramento; and sometimes as far as the Bay Area. These commutes are quite long, resulting in many residents becoming super commuters. Many of those who do not commute to the Sacramento Valley work locally in retail, wholesale, trade, engineering, manufacturing, construction, and other businesses, as well in local and state government. A significant number of high-tech electronics companies are in the area.

Another significant sector of the local economy is agriculture, as the soil in Nevada County is quite fertile. Around the time of the Gold Rush, farmers planted orchards, vegetables, and other produce as ranchers brought in cattle, sheep, and other livestock. While the proportion of land dedicated to agriculture has significantly decreased over the last few decades, agriculture continues to be an important aspect of the local economy, including organic agricultural products. Nevada County has also become known for its growing wine industry.

Major employers in Grass Valley include Nevada Union High School, Nevada Irrigation District, Sierra Nevada Memorial Hospital, Golden Empire Nursing and Rehab Center, AJA Video Systems, Inc. and Briar Patch Food Co-op.

The Grass Valley Group is a media technology research and development company founded in the city in 1959.

== Government ==
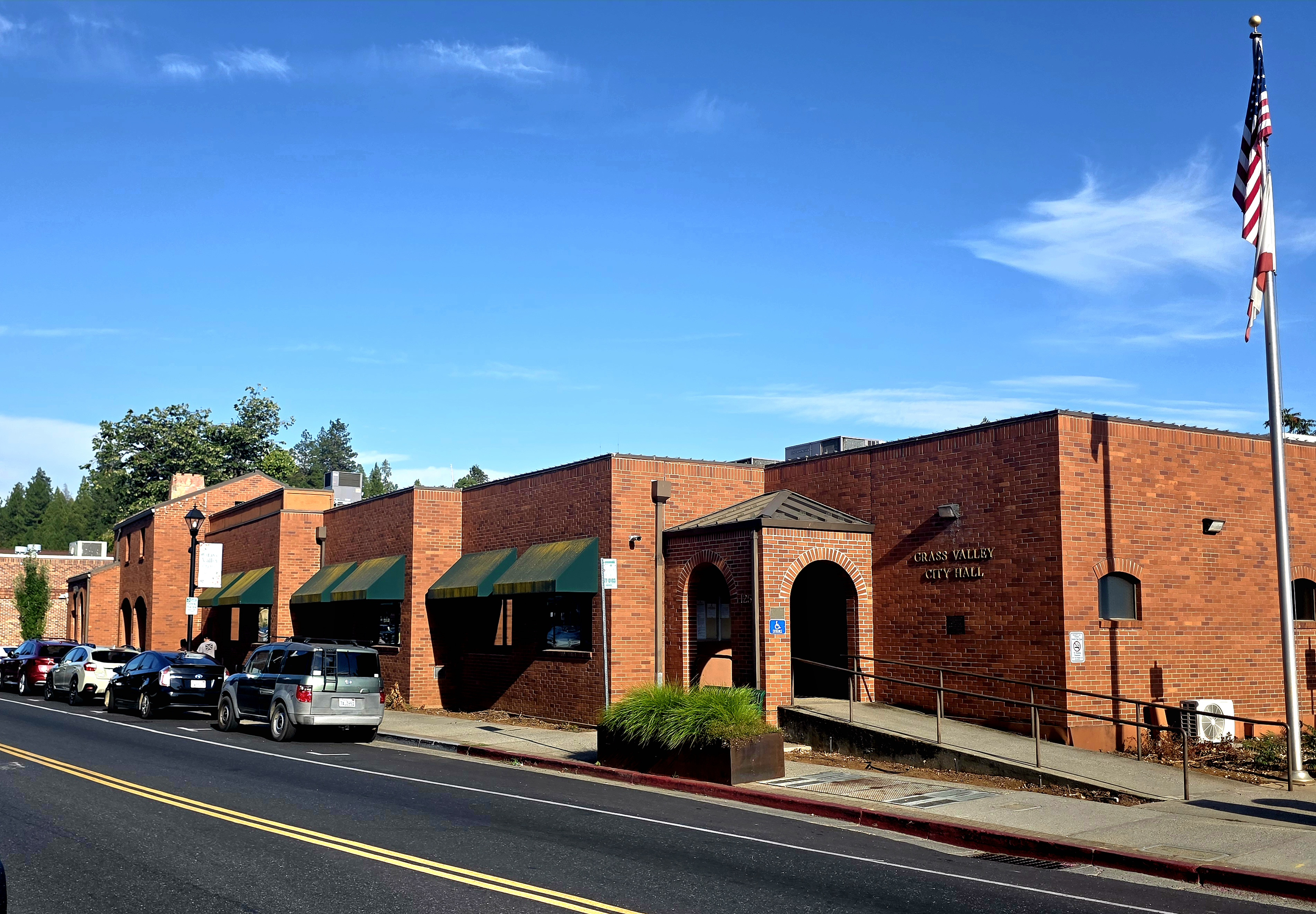
Grass Valley City Hall and Police Department

Grass Valley has been a charter city since it was incorporated in 1893. It uses a council-manager form of government.

=== Representatives ===
In the California State Legislature, Grass Valley is in the 1st senatorial district, represented by Republican Megan Dahle, and the 1st Assembly district, represented by Republican Heather Hadwick.

In the United States House of Representatives, Grass Valley is in California's 3rd congressional district, represented by Independent Kevin Kiley.

== Education ==
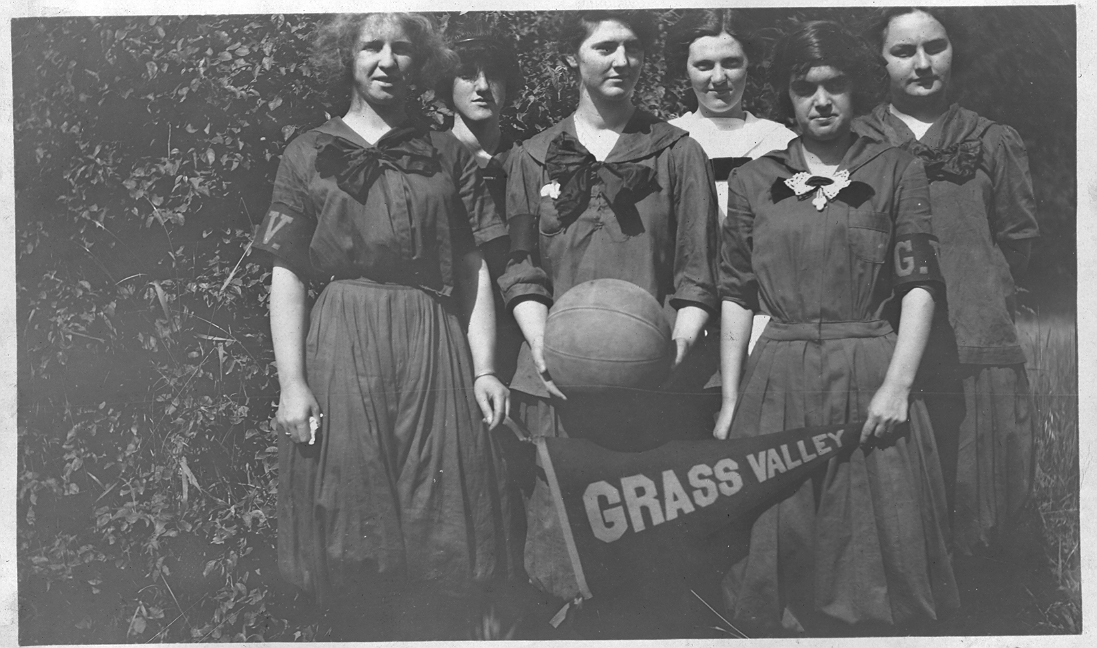
Grass Valley High School girls' basketball team, 1918

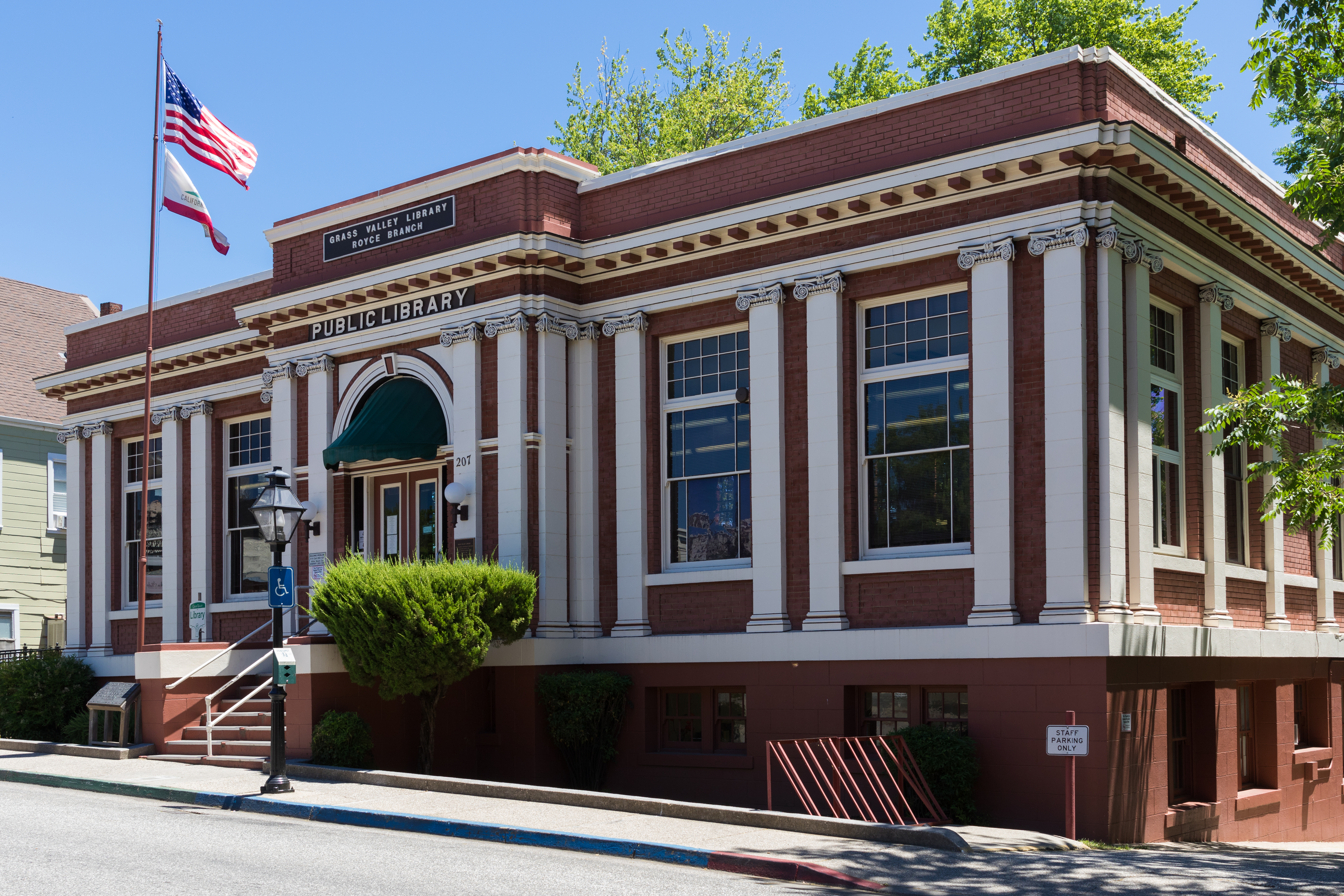
The public library, named for Josiah Royce

=== Higher education ===
- Nevada County Campus of Sierra College

=== Public primary and secondary schools ===
The majority of Grass Valley is within the Grass Valley Elementary School District while small portions are within the Nevada City Elementary School District. All of it is in the Nevada Joint Union High School District.

Schools of the Grass Valley elementary district:

- Bell Hill Academy
- Grass Valley Charter School
- Lyman Gilmore Middle School
- Scotten Elementary School

The Nevada elementary district has two schools: Deer Creek Elementary School and Seven Hills Intermediate School.

The high school district operates:

- Bear River High School
- Nevada Union High School
- William and Marian Ghidotti Early College High School

Other area schools

- Bitney College Prep Charter High School
- Cottage Hill Elementary School
- Forest Charter School
- Magnolia Intermediate School
- Pleasant Ridge Elementary School
- Sierra Academy of Expeditionary Learning
- Union Hill Middle School
- Yuba River Charter School
- Clear Creek Elementary School
- Alta Sierra Elementary School
- Nevada City School of the Arts

=== Public libraries ===
- Josiah Royce Public Library

== Transportation ==
Grass Valley is at the intersection of State Route 49 and State Route 20. Public transportation is served by the Gold Country Stage and limited to the urban areas.

== Designated historical landmarks ==
- Empire Mine State Historic Park (CHL#298)
- Grass Valley Public Library (NRHP#92000267)
- Holbrooke Hotel (CHL#914)
- Home of Lola Montez (CHL#292)
- Home of Lotta Crabtree (CHL#293)
- Lyman Gilmore Middle School
- Mount Saint Mary's Convent and Academy (CHL#855)
- North Star Mine Powerhouse (CHL#843)
- Overland Emigrant Trail (CHL#799)
- Site of the First Discoveries of Quartz Gold in California (CHL#297)

== Sister cities ==
Grass Valley has two sister cities:

- Bodmin, Cornwall, United Kingdom
- Limana, Italy

== Notable people ==
- Sam Aanestad, dentist and politician
- Cecelia Ager, American film critic and reporter
- Patrick Brice, film director, actor
- Hunter Burgan, musician
- John Cardiel, professional skateboarder
- Lou Conter, last known survivor of the sinking of the USS Arizona
- Lotta Crabtree, 19th-century actress
- Pete Daley, baseball player
- Jonathan Dayton, film director
- Alonzo Delano, first city treasurer
- Mary Florence Denton, educator in Japan
- Matt DiBenedetto, NASCAR driver
- Brodie Farber, professional fighter
- Arthur De Wint Foote, mining engineer
- Mary Hallock Foote, author and illustrator
- Lisa Mispley Fortier, NCAA WBB coach
- Marcellite Garner, Disney animation cel painter, voice actress who was the voice of Minnie Mouse, comic strip artist
- John Arthur Gellatly, Lieutenant Governor of Washington
- Lyman Gilmore, historically significant pilot
- Charles Scott Haley, mining engineer, expert in the field of placer gold deposits.
- Fred Hargesheimer, World War II pilot, philanthropist
- John Flint Kidder, builder, historically significant railroad owner
- Sarah Kidder, historically significant railroad owner
- Mark Meckler, political activist
- Lola Montez, 19th-century dancer
- Joanna Newsom, American singer-songwriter
- Jim Pagliaroni, professional baseball player
- Mike Pinder, musician
- Charles H. Prisk, newspaper editor-publisher
- William F. Prisk, State Senator, newspaper editor-publisher
- Chuck Ragan, singer, songwriter, guitarist
- Dennis Richmond, news anchor
- John Rollin Ridge, writer
- Clint Ritchie, actor
- Tim Rossovich, professional football player, actor
- Josiah Royce, philosopher
- Gabe Ruediger, professional fighter
- Chris Senn, professional skateboarder
- Jeremy Sisto, actor
- Meadow Sisto, actress
- John Aloysius Stanton, painter, born in Grass Valley.
- Wallace Stegner, author and winner of the Pulitzer Prize
- J. Christopher Stevens, assassinated U.S. ambassador to Libya, born in Grass Valley
- Brad Sweet, World of Outlaws Sprint Car Driver and 5X Champion
- Clint Walker, actor
- William Watt, miner, State Senator, University of California Regent
- Chuck Yeager, test pilot, first person to break the sound barrier

== See also ==
- Little Grass Valley, California
- Cyan Engineering
