= Home of Lola Montez =

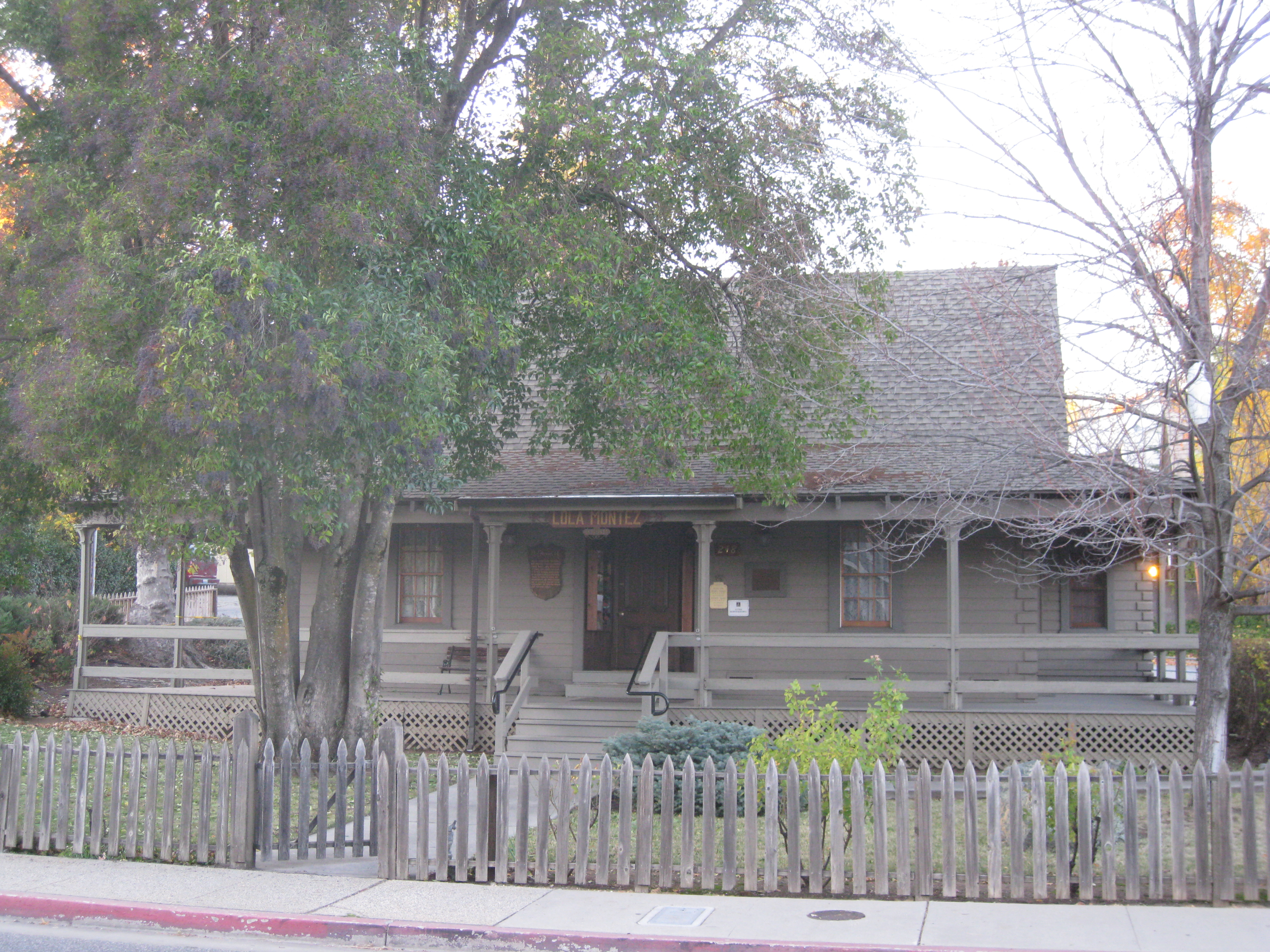
- Front facade, Lola Montez Home.

- Location within California Location within the United States
- 39.21657°N 121.06401°W
- Location: 248 Mill Street; Grass Valley, California

California Historical Landmark
- Designated: 20 July 1938
- Reference no.: 292

The Home of Lola Montez is located in downtown Grass Valley, California at 248 Mill Street. Lola Montez, the internationally known singer and dancer, moved here in 1853, and this is the only home she ever owned.

== History ==
In November 1850, Grass Valley held its first election under an oak tree on the site where the home was soon built. The following year, in 1851, a building was constructed on the property and used as an office for Gilmor Meredith's Gold Hill Mining Company. The building was used as a schoolhouse in 1852.

Montez moved to Grass Valley in 1853 and purchased the building for her home. She hosted parties in her salon, kept a pet bear, and mentored the young Lotta Crabtree whose home (later, a historical landmark) was on the same street. Montez left Grass Valley in 1855. In subsequent years, the building was remodeled and by 1975, it was condemned.

The current building is a replica of the one depicted in an 1854 sketch. It houses the Nevada County Chamber of Commerce and a small museum.

== California Historical Landmark ==
This Nevada County building is California Historical Landmark No. 292. It was registered on 20 July 1938.

== See also ==
- California Historical Landmarks in Nevada County, California
