= Home of Lotta Crabtree =

- Location within California Location within the United States
- 39.21665°N 121.06392°W
- Location: 238 Mill Street; Grass Valley, California

California Historical Landmark
- Reference no.: 293

The Home of Lotta Crabtree is located in downtown Grass Valley, California at 238 Mill Street.

== History ==
Lotta's father, John Crabtree, arrived to Grass Valley in the early 1850s as part of the California Gold Rush. Lotta and her mother joined him in 1853. The Crabtrees, British immigrants, ran their home as a boarding house for the miners, many of whom were Cornish. Lotta, then age six, caught the attention of her neighbor, the internationally acclaimed singer and dancer Lola Montez, whose home (later, a historical landmark) was on the same street. Lotta moved away in 1856, later becoming a wealthy and beloved American entertainer of the late 19th century.

== Landmark ==
This Nevada County building is honored as California Historical Landmark No. 293, registered on 15 August 1938. The plaque's inscription states:

Home of Lotta Crabtree

Lotta Crabtree was born in New York in 1847. In 1852-3 the gold fever brought her family to California. Several months after arriving in San Francisco, Mrs. Crabtree and Lotta went to Grass Valley and with Mr. Crabtree started a boarding house for miners. It was here that Lotta met Lola Montez, who taught her to sing and dance. In Scales, Plumas County, Lotta made her first public appearance, which led to a successful career on stage here and abroad.

The house is also listed in a database of women's history sites created by the Women's Progress Commemorative Commission.

== See also ==
- California Historical Landmarks in Nevada County
