= Dubakella =

Dubakella soil series is the name given to a reddish-brown stony loam soil which has developed on ultramafic rock containing magnesium minerals such as serpentine or asbestos. This soil occurs from southwestern Oregon south to the Coast Ranges of California near Healdsburg, and it also is found in the Sierra Nevada mountains and foothills.

In common with other ultramafic soils, Dubakella has a poor balance of nutrients which does not allow the vegetation it supports to match the luxuriance seen on adjacent non-ultramafic sites. Jeffrey Pine is usually the most common tree, accompanied by Douglas-Fir, Incense-Cedar, and Sugar Pine—all in open, somewhat stunted stands. Stunting may be less severe in areas which have been dusted with nutrient-bearing volcanic ash. In some areas, as at Grass Valley and near Nevada City, the less stately Gray Pine is dominant. On the poorest sites vegetation may be held to a chaparral-like state.

In addition to being inferior for forestry and poor for agriculture, Dubakella may present a health hazard due to presence of asbestos. Any Dubakella land which has been developed or is scheduled in that direction should be tested.

== References and External links ==
- Series Extent Explorer | California Soil Resource Lab Series Extent Explorer (DUBAKELLA)
- Official Series Description - DUBAKELLA Series Official Series Description
- Naturally Occurring Asbestos:Approaches for Reducing Exposure
- Google Maps Google Street View of Gray Pine on Dubakella loam in Grass Valley
- Google Maps This developed area of Dubakella loam in Grass Valley, as seen in Google Street View, is home to serpentine-tolerant sweetgum and Deodar
