= Laymen's Inquiry =

Christian missionary activity in Asia

The Laymen's Inquiry, Laymen's Report, or Hocking report of 1932, evaluated American Christian missionary activity in Asia. It was produced under the leadership of William Ernest Hocking and recommended a change from evangelism to education and social welfare.

== History ==
William Ernest Hocking was a Professor of Idealist Philosophy at Harvard University. His work focused on integrating idealism and pragmatism.

In January 1930, a group of Baptist laymen met with John R. Mott, chairman of the International Missionary Council. At this time, Protestant missionaries had been at work in Asia for a century, but now were experiencing falling donations and nationalistic resistance. From this meeting came a plan to conduct an intensive, objective study of the value of foreign missions in Asia. Seven denominations agreed to join the study; Presbyterian Church in the U.S.A., Reformed Church in America (Dutch Reformed), United Presbyterian, Methodist Episcopal, Congregational, Protestant Episcopal and Northern Baptist. Each denomination sent five representatives to take part. One Quaker, Rufus M Jones, also took part in the commission and later wrote a book on the subject, entitled A Preface to Christian Faith in a New Age.

Later that year, 27 members of the Institute of Social and Religious Research travelled to India, China, and Japan and spent several months collecting information on missionary work and compiling a report. The following year, Hocking led the Commission of Appraisal (17 ministers and laypeople) who travelled to Asia and compiled their own reports. While in China, Hocking consulted with the writer Pearl S. Buck, who was developing a similar critique of missions and who threw her support behind the Commission's report. The two reports were combined to create the final report, Re-Thinking Missions: A Laymen's Inquiry After One Hundred Years, which was published in November 1932. Subsidiary reports on individual countries were published the following year.

The Commission recommended a greater emphasis on education and welfare, transfer of power to local groups, less reliance on evangelizing, with respectful appreciation for local religions. A recommended related goal was the transition of local leadership and institutions. The Commission also recommended reorganization in the US to coordinate and focus missionary efforts by creating a single organization for Protestant missions.

== Reception ==
The report was very popular and sold over 43,000 copies in less than six months. The report reflected changing ideas about the wisdom of a reduced role for western missionaries, which generated fierce debate.
