= Charles Scott Haley =

American mining engineer and author (1884–1958)

- Haley ca. 1934
- Born: November 8, 1884; Alameda County, California
- Died: 1958 (aged 73–74)
- Education: University of California, Berkeley
- Known for: Gold placers of California: California State Mining Bureau Bulletin 92, 1923
- Scientific career
- Fields: Geology; mining

Charles Scott Haley (November 8, 1884 – 1958) was an American a mining engineer. He was an expert in the field of placer gold deposits. His 1923 work, Gold placers of California (California State Mining Bureau Bulletin 92, 1923) described all economic occurrences of alluvial gold deposits in California that were known at the time. Bulletin 92 was the first statewide comprehensive study of tertiary fluvial placers, dredge fields, and dry placers. Even in the present day, it continues to be a standard reference.

== Early life and education ==
Haley was born in Alameda County, California. His parents, married on October 3, 1876, were Caleb Scott Haley (born February 16, 1833), of Chebogue, Nova Scotia, and Annie Louisa Barclay (born December 6, 1852) of Tusket, Nova Scotia. His paternal grandparents were Ebenezer Haley and Mary Lee Scott. His maternal grandparents were Andrew Barclay and Mary Elizabeth Morton.

In 1907, he received a bachelor's degree from the College of Mining at University of California, Berkeley.

== Career ==
His early mining experiences were in Alaska, California, and Oregon, as well as Colombia, Honduras, and Peru. He opened an office in San Francisco in 1917, and shortly thereafter, joined the United States Army Corps of Engineers, attaining the rank of major during World War I.

In 1921, upon returning from an assignment in British Columbia, Haley was retained by the California State Mining Bureau to document California's gold placers. After conducting the study, he authored Gold placers of California: California State Mining Bureau Bulletin 92 and Topographic map of Sierra Nevada gold belt showing distribution of the auriferous gravels, in 1923.

One of his articles also appeared in the journal, Mining and Scientific Press.

== Personal life ==
Haley married at the age of 50, and had six children: David, Janet, Kathleen, Marcia, Allan and Brian. His wife, Jean, was a teacher at Nevada City Elementary School. He died at Grass Valley, California on April 12, 1958.

== Selected works ==
- (1923). Gold placers of California. San Francisco: California State Mining Bureau. OCLC 3080130
- (1923). Topographic map of Sierra Nevada gold belt showing distribution of the auriferous gravels. San Francisco: California State Mining Bureau. OCLC 81025598
