= Grass Valley Public Library =

- U.S. National Register of Historic Places
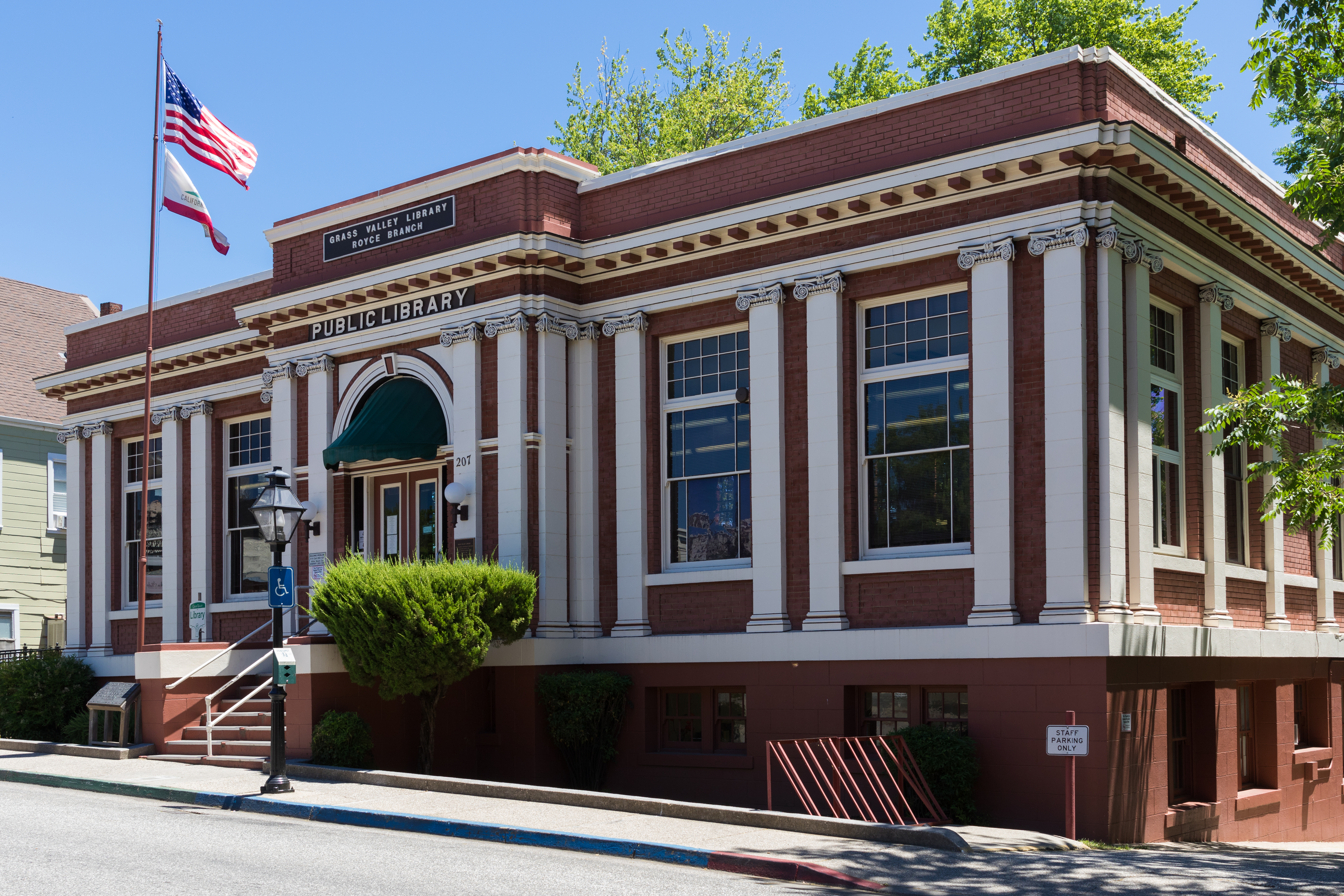
- Grass Valley Library-Royce Branch

- Location within California Location within the United States
- Location: 207 Mill St, Grass Valley, California
- Coordinates: 39°12′58″N 121°3′50″W
- Built: 1916
- Architect: William Mooser
- Architectural style: Classical Revival (Type A)
- MPS: California Carnegie Libraries MPS
- NRHP reference No.: 92000267
- Added to NRHP: March 26, 1992

The Grass Valley Public Library (renamed the Grass Valley Library-Royce Branch) is a Carnegie library and on the National Register of Historic Places. Located in Grass Valley, California and a part of the Nevada County Library System, it is open Tuesday through Saturday.

== History ==
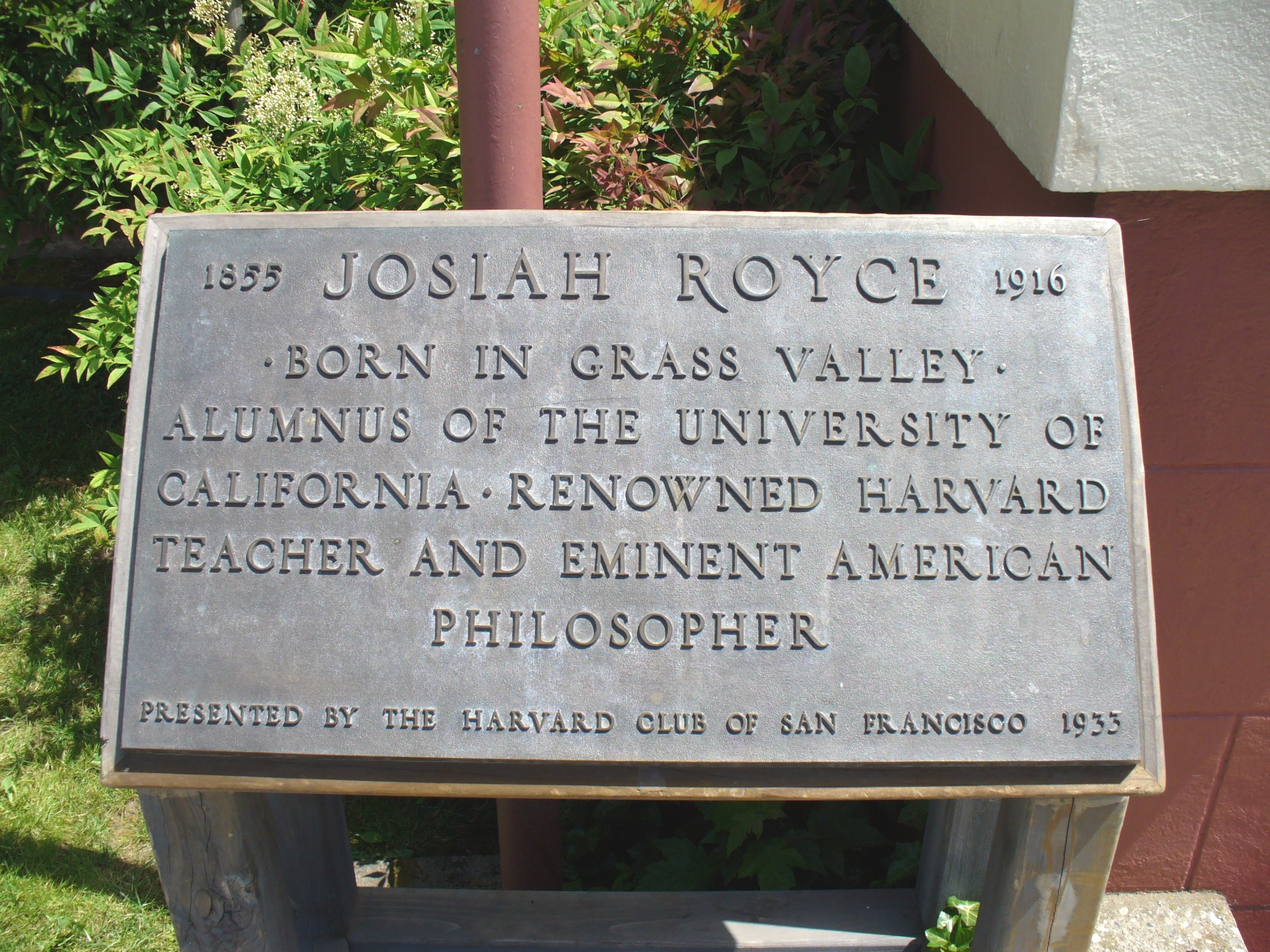
Plaque added in 2005 at the library's entrance when it was renamed in honor of Josiah Royce

There were several early attempts to establish a library in the California Gold Rush town of Grass Valley. The first was in 1860, followed by another in 1869, but neither survived. The Emmanuel Episcopal Church was established in Grass Valley in 1858, but it wasn't until 1901 that the non-denominational Emmanuel Church Library opened to provide library services to "the Atheist and the Buddhist if such there be".

A decade later, the city became the library's governing body. It requested a Carnegie grant in 1914 and received $15,000 the following year. The chosen building site, at 207 Mill Street, near the intersection of Mill and Neal Street, had been the birthplace and early home of philosopher Josiah Royce.

In 2005, the library, now a branch of the county library system, was renamed to honor Royce.

== Structure ==
San Francisco architect William Sebastian Mooser was selected over William Weeks to design the new library. The builders were Welch Bros. and Hannemann from Oakland who also built the Gridley Carnegie Library.

The building is of Neoclassical architecture (also known as "classical revival" style). Its exterior includes red brick and white pilasters.
