= William Watt (miner) =

American politician

William Watt (July 14, 1828 – July 5, 1878) was a California Gold Rush mining executive, California State Senator, Regent of the University of California, Director of the Nevada County Narrow Gauge Railroad, and owner of the Grass Valley Telegraph, the first newspaper in that town.

== Personal life ==
Watt was born in Scotland, and spent his early years as a marine engineer. He came to the US when he was 20 and by 1852 was in California. He was a Royal Arch Mason.

== Career ==
He participated in the California Gold Rush by working and purchasing mines in the Grass Valley area. Watt was superintendent and part owner of the Eureka Mine. He also owned the Massachusetts Mine in Grass Valley and discovered the Derbec Mine (near North Bloomfield). From 1861 until 1863, he served as California State Senator from Nevada County. He served as Regent from 1868 until his resignation in 1871, when he became a candidate for Governor of California on the Democratic Party ticket. Watt died in North Bloomfield, California following an accident involving a runaway buggy.
