= Josiah Royce =

American philosopher (1855–1916)

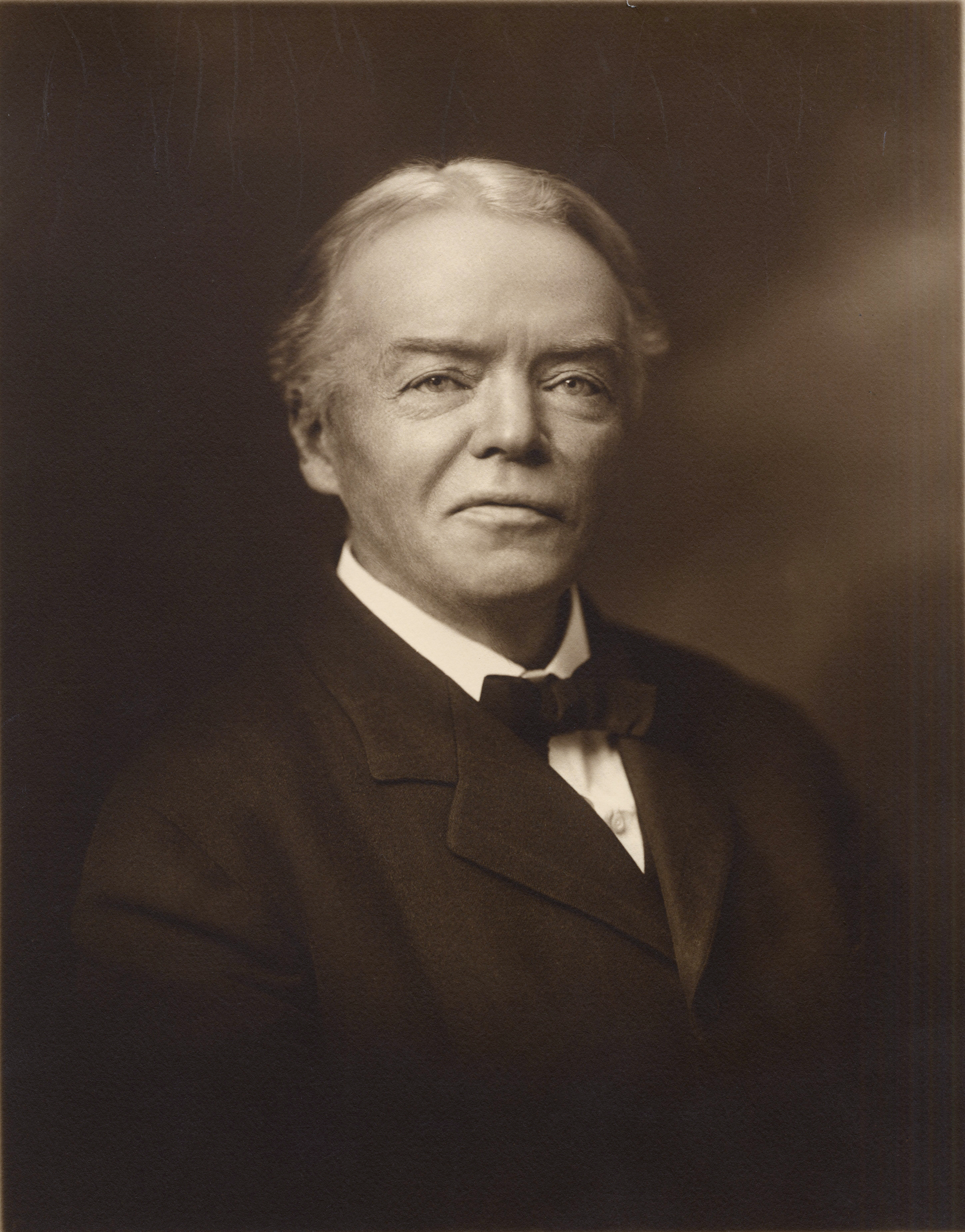
- Royce, c. 1910
- Born: November 20, 1855; Grass Valley, California, U.S.
- Died: September 14, 1916 (aged 60); Cambridge, Massachusetts, U.S.

Education
- Education: University of California, Berkeley (BA); University of Göttingen; Johns Hopkins University (PhD)
- Thesis: Of the Interdependence of the Principles of Knowledge (1878)
- Academic advisors: William James; Hermann Lotze; C. S. Peirce; Wilhelm Windelband; Wilhelm Wundt

Philosophical work
- Era: 19th-/20th-century philosophy
- Region: Western philosophy: American philosophy
- School: Pragmatism; American idealism Objective idealism
- Doctoral students: Curt John Ducasse; William Ernest Hocking; C. I. Lewis; George Santayana; Henry M. Sheffer
- Notable students: Conrad Aiken, George Boas, Van Wyck Brooks, Witter Bynner, W. E. B. Du Bois, Max Eastman, T. S. Eliot, Felix Frankfurter, Learned Hand, Edwin Holt, Horace Kallen, Walter Lippmann, Alain Locke, Jacob Loewenberg, Ralph Barton Perry, Edward Rand, Gertrude Stein, Wallace Stevens
- Main interests: Ethics, philosophy of religion, metaphysics
- Notable ideas: Philosophy of loyalty

Josiah Royce (/rɔɪs/; November 20, 1855 – September 14, 1916) was an American pragmatist and absolute idealist philosopher and the founder of American idealism. His philosophical ideas included his joining of pragmatism and idealism, his philosophy of loyalty, and his defense of absolutism.

Royce's essay "A Word for the Times" (December 1914) was quoted in the 1936 State of the Union Address by Franklin Delano Roosevelt: "The human race now passes through one of its great crises. New ideas, new issues – a new call for men to carry on the work of righteousness, of charity, of courage, of patience, and of loyalty. [...] I studied, I loved, I labored, unsparingly and hopefully, to be worthy of my generation."

== Life ==
Royce, born on November 20, 1855, in Grass Valley, California, was the son of Josiah and Sarah Eleanor (Bayliss) Royce, whose families were recent English emigrants and who sought their fortune in the westward movement of the American pioneers in 1849. In 1875 he received a B.A. from the University of California, Berkeley (which moved from Oakland to Berkeley during his matriculation), where he later accepted an instructorship teaching English composition, literature, and rhetoric.

While at the university, he studied with Joseph LeConte, Professor of Geology and Natural History and a prominent spokesperson for the compatibility between evolution and religion. In a memorial published shortly after LeConte's death, Royce described the impact of LeConte's teaching on his own development, writing: "the wonder thus aroused was, for me, the beginning of philosophy" (p. 328). After studying logic under Hermann Lotze at the University of Göttingen, he returned to the United States to finish his doctorate at Johns Hopkins University, where he was awarded one of the institution's first four doctorates, in philosophy in 1878. At Johns Hopkins he taught a course on the history of German thought, which was “one of his chief interests” because he was able to give consideration to the philosophy of history. After four years at the University of California, Berkeley, he went to Harvard in 1882 as a sabbatical replacement for William James, who was Royce's friend and philosophical antagonist. Royce's position at Harvard was made permanent in 1884, and he remained there until his death on September 14, 1916.

Royce was an elected member of the American Academy of Arts and Sciences, the United States National Academy of Sciences, and the American Philosophical Society.

== Historiography ==
Royce stands out starkly in the philosophical crowd because he was the only major American philosopher who spent a significant period of his life studying and writing history, specifically of the American West. “As one of the four giants in American philosophy of his time […] Royce overshadowed himself as historian, in both reputation and output” (Pomeroy, 2). During his first three years at Harvard, Royce taught many different subjects such as English composition, forensics, psychology and philosophy for other professors. Although he eventually settled into writing philosophy, his early adulthood was characterized by wide-ranging interests, during which he wrote a novel, investigated paranormal phenomena (as a skeptic), and published a significant body of literary criticism. Only as historian and philosopher did he distinguish himself. Royce spread himself too thin, however, and in 1888 suffered a nervous breakdown which required him to take a leave of absence from his duties.

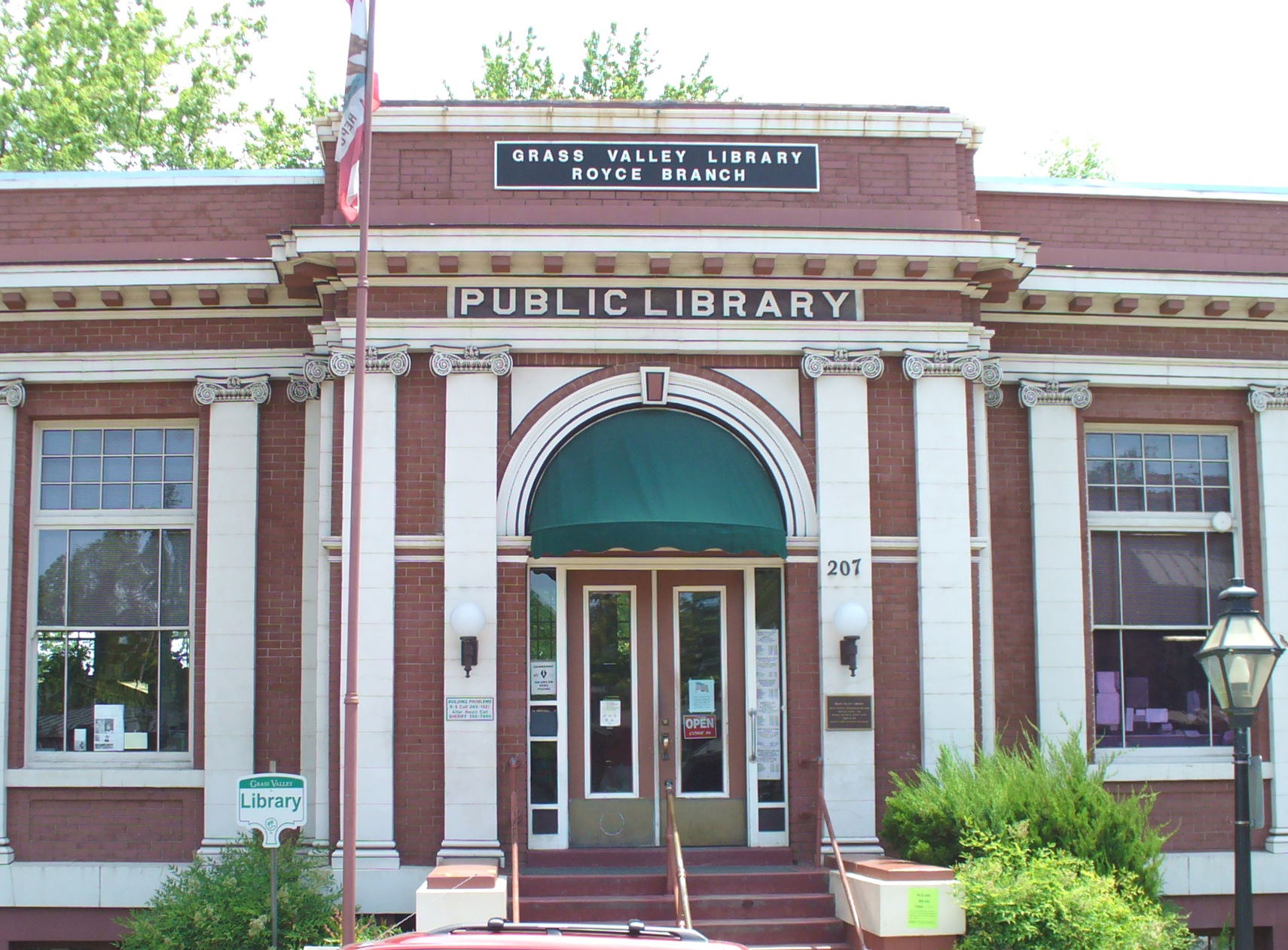
Grass Valley Library Royce Branch

John Clendenning's 1999 book is the standard biography of Royce. Autobiographical remarks by Royce can be found in Oppenheim's study. In 1883 Royce was approached by a publishing company who asked him to write the state history of California, “In view of his precarious circumstances at Harvard and his desire to pursue the philosophical work for which he had come east, Royce found the prospect attractive […]. He wrote to a friend that he was ‘tempted by the money’”. Royce viewed the task as a side project, which he could use to fill his free time. In 1891 his historical writing career came to an end, but not before he had published several reviews of California’s historical volumes, and articles in journals to supplement his history. Royce is also mentioned in the book The Unseen Guest by Joan Darby.

== Philosophy ==
The years between 1882 and 1895 established Royce as one of the most eminent American philosophers. His publication in 1885 of The Religious Aspect of Philosophy, and in 1892 of The Spirit of Modern Philosophy, both based on Harvard lectures, secured his place in the philosophical world. The former of these contained a new proof for the existence of God based upon the reality of error. All errors are judged to be erroneous in comparison to some total truth, Royce argued, and we must either hold ourselves infallible or accept that even our errors are evidence of a world of truth. Having made it clear that idealism depends upon postulates and proceeds hypothetically, Royce defends the necessity of objective reference of our ideas to a universal whole within which they belong, for without these postulates, "both practical life and the commonest results of theory, from the simplest impressions to the most valuable beliefs, would be for most if not all of us utterly impossible".

The justification for idealistic postulates is practical (a point Royce made repeatedly in his maturity, accepting the label of pragmatist for himself), to the extent that it embraced practical life as the guide and determiner of the value of philosophical ideas. Royce accepted the fact that he had not and could not offer a complete or satisfactory account of the "relation of the individual minds to the all-embracing mind” (see RAP, p. 371), but he pushes ahead in spite of this difficulty to offer the best account he can manage. This stance is called fallibilism by the philosophers of his generation, and Royce's embrace of it may be attributed to the influence of Charles Sanders Peirce and William James.

Royce is typically labeled an absolute idealist, but it is debated whether he holds a contrary viewed called personalism—i.e., “The ambiguous relation of the conscious individuals to the universal thought...will be decided in the sense of their inclusion, as elements in the universal thought. They will indeed not become 'things in the dream' of any other person than themselves, but their whole reality, just exactly as it is in them, will be found to be but a fragment of a higher reality. This reality will be no power, nor will it produce the individuals by dreaming of them, but it will complete the existence that in them, as separate beings, has no rational completeness”. (RAP, pp. 380–381) This is an unavoidable hypothesis, Royce believed, and its moral and religious aspect point to the existence of an Absolute.

=== Absolutism and temporalism ===
The “Absolute" Royce defended was quite different from the ideas of Georg Wilhelm Friedrich Hegel and F. H. Bradley. Royce's Absolute is the ground and originator of community, a personal, temporal being who preserves the past in its entirety, sustains the full present by an act of interpretation, and anticipates every possibility in the future, infusing these possibilities with value as the ideal of community. The principal difference between Royce's Absolute and the similar idea held by other thinkers is its temporal and personal character, and its interpretive activity. This divine activity Royce increasingly came to see in terms of the notion suggested by Charles Sanders Peirce of “agapism”, or “evolutionary love”. Royce believed that human beings do have experience of the Absolute in the irrevocability of each and every deed we do. To confront the way that our acts cannot be undone is to meet the Absolute in its temporal necessity. The philosophical idea of the Absolute is an inevitable hypothesis for a coherent system of thought, Royce argued, but for practical purposes and a meaningful ethical life, all human beings need is an ongoing "will to interpret". The temporal ground of all acts of interpretation is "the Interpreter Spirit", which is another name for the Absolute, but a philosophical understanding of such a being is not required for successful interpretation and ethical life.

=== The "conception of God" debate ===
A benchmark in Royce's career and thought occurred when he returned to California to speak to the Philosophical Union at Berkeley, ostensibly to defend his concept of God from the criticisms of George Holmes Howison, Joseph Le Conte, and Sidney Mezes, a meeting the New York Times called “a battle of the giants”. There Royce offered a new modal version of his proof for the reality of God based upon ignorance rather than error, based upon the fragmentariness of individual existence rather than its epistemological uncertainty. However, Howison attacked Royce's doctrine for having left no ontological standing for the individual over against the Absolute, rendering Royce's idealism a kind of pernicious impersonalism, according to Howison. Royce never intended this result and responded to Howison's criticism first in a long supplementary essay to the debate (1897), and then by developing the philosophy of the individual person in greater detail in his Gifford Lectures, published under the title The World and the Individual (1899, 1901). Simultaneously Royce was enduring a resolute assault on his hypothetical absolutism from James.

Royce later admitted that his engagement with the philosophy of Bradley may have led to a more robust engagement with the Absolute than was warranted, and it might be added that his persistent reading of Spinoza might have had similar effects.

=== The World and the individual ===
The First Series of Gifford Lectures made the case against three historical conceptions of being, called “realism”, “mysticism”, and “critical rationalism”, by Royce, and defended a “Fourth Conception of Being”. Realism, according to Royce, held that to be is to be independent, which mysticism and critical rationalism advanced other criteria, that to be way to, immediacy in the case of mysticism and objective validity in critical rationalism. As hypotheses about the fundamental character of being, Royce shows each of these falls into contradiction. In contrast Royce offers as his hypothesis that “to be is to be uniquely related to a whole”. This formulation preserves all three crucial aspects of being, namely the Whole, the individual, and the relation that constitutes them. Where previously Royce's hypotheses about ontology had taken for granted that relations are discovered in the analysis of terms, here he moves to the recognition that terms are constituted by their relations, and insofar as terms are taken to refer to entities, as we must assume, we are obliged to think about individuals as uniquely constituted by a totality of relations to other individuals and to the Whole that are theirs alone. In the Second Series of Gifford Lectures Royce temporalizes these relations, showing that we learn to think about ideas like succession and space by noting differences and directionality within unified and variable “timespans”, or qualitative, durational episodes of the “specious present”. Royce explains, “our temporal form of experience is thus peculiarly the form of the Will as such”. (The World and the Individual, Second Series, p. 124)

Hence, for Royce, the will is the inner dynamism that reaches beyond itself into a possible future and acts upon an acknowledged past. Space and the abstract descriptions that are appropriate to it are a falsification of this dynamism, and metaphysical error, especially “realism”, proceeds from taking these abstractions literally. Philosophy itself proceeds along descriptive lines and therefore must offer its ontology as a kind of fiction. But ideas, considered dynamically, temporally instead of spatially, in light of what they do in the world of practice and qualities, do have temporal forms and are activities. The narrative presentation of ideas, such as belongs to the World of Appreciation, is “more easily effective than description...for space furnishes indeed the stage and the scenery of the universe, but the world’s play occurs in time”. (WI2, pp. 124–125). Time conceived abstractly in the World of Description, although it can never be wholly spatialized, provides us with an idea of eternity, while time lived and experienced grounds this description (and every other), historically, ethically, and aesthetically. Since philosophy proceeds descriptively rather than narratively, “the real world of our Idealism has to be viewed by us men as a temporal order”, in which “purposes are fulfilled, or where finite internal meanings reach their final expression and attain unity with external meanings”.

Hence, for Royce, it is a limitation of conceptual thought that obliges us to philosophize according to logic rather than integrating our psychological and appreciated experience into our philosophical doctrines. There is ample evidence for supposing a parallelism between our conceptual and perceptual experiences, and for using the former as a guide to the latter, according to Royce, particularly with regard to the way that the idealization of our inner purposes enables us to connect them with the purposes of others in a larger whole of which we have no immediate experience. We can appreciate the sense of fulfillment we find in serving a larger whole and form our characters progressively upon the ways in which those experiences of fulfillment point us outwards, beyond the finite self, but we are not so constitute as to experience the greater Whole to which our experiences belong. We cannot help supposing that there is some experiencer within whose inner life the Whole exists, but only the inevitability of the assumption and not any experiential content assures us of the reality of such an experiencer.

=== The philosophy of loyalty ===
This social metaphysics lays the groundwork for Royce's philosophy of loyalty. The book of this title published in 1908 derived from lectures given at the Lowell Institute, at Yale, Harvard, and at the University of Illinois in 1906–07. The basic ideas were explicit in his writings as early as his history of California. Here Royce set out one of the most original and important moral philosophies in the recent history of philosophy.

His notion of “loyalty” was essentially a universalized and ecumenical interpretation of Christian agapic love. Broadly speaking, Royce's is a virtue ethic in which our loyalty to increasingly less immediate ideals becomes the formative moral influence in our personal development. As persons become increasingly able to form loyalties, the practical and ongoing devotion to a cause bigger than themselves, and as these loyalties become unifiable in the higher purposes of groups of persons over many generations, humanity is increasingly better able to recognize that the highest ideal is the creation of a perfected “beloved community” in which each and every person shares. The beloved community as an ideal experienced in our acts of loyal service integrates into Royce's moral philosophy a Kingdom of Ends, but construed as immanent and operative instead of transcendental and regulative.

While the philosophical status of this ideal remains hypothetical, the living of it in the fulfillment of our finite purposes concretizes it for each and every individual. Each of us, no matter how morally undeveloped we may be, has fulfilled experiences that point to the reality of experience beyond what is given to us personally. This wider reality is exemplified most commonly by when we fall in love. The “spiritual union [of the lovers] also has a personal, a conscious existence, upon a higher than human level. An analogous unity of consciousness, a unity superhuman in grade, but intimately bound up with, and inclusive of, our separate personalities, must exist, if loyalty is well founded, wherever a real cause wins the true devotion of ourselves. Grant such an hypothesis, and then loyalty becomes no pathetic serving of a myth. The good which our causes possesses, then, also becomes a concrete fact for an experience of a higher than human level”. (The Philosophy of Loyalty, p. 311).

This move illustrates what Royce calls his “absolute pragmatism”, the claim that ideals are thoroughly practical—the more inclusive being more practical. The concretization of ideals cannot therefore be empirically doubted except at the cost of rendering our conscious life inexplicable. If we admit that the concretization of ideals genuinely occurs, Royce argues, then we are not only entitled but compelled to take seriously and regard as real the larger intelligible structures within which those ideals exist, which is the purposive character of the divine Will. The way in which persons sort out higher and lower causes is by examining whether one's service destroys the loyalty of others, or what is best in them. Ultimately personal character reaches its acme in the recognition that service of lost causes, through which we may learn that our ultimate loyalty is to loyalty itself.

Some recent scholarship on Royce has framed his philosophy of loyalty as being based on racist theories of assimilation and conquest. Tommy J. Curry argues that previous generations of Royce scholars have ignored the historical context and primary texts Josiah Royce used to develop his theories of racial contact. Curry writes that Royce was widely read as both an imperialist and an anti-Black racist by his contemporaries. Other American philosophers such as John Moffatt Mecklin, a pragmatist and a segregationist, openly challenged Josiah Royce's views of race and the Negro. Mecklin insisted that Royce's theories suggested that while white Anglos had a racial gift and duty to lead the world towards the ideal, the Negro had no special gift and as such could have their racial traits destroyed through assimilation.

Furthermore, Royce's ideas deeply influenced the work of Mary Parker Follett, the so called "mother of modern management." She took from Royce the idea that "a community is a social group that shares some of the same personal unity as individual persons" and applied this to the modern corporate world.

=== The problem of Christianity ===
The final phase of Royce's thought involved the application and further illustration of the concepts he had defended since 1881. Some have seen here a fundamental shift in Royce's thinking but the evidence is far from conclusive. Royce's hypothetical ontology, temporalism, personalism, his social metaphysics based on the fourth conception of being remain, along with the operation of agapic loyalty, and the unity of finite purposes in the ideal of the beloved community. There is no obvious shift in method and no overt move to abandon idealism. Royce himself declared the “successive expressions” of the philosophy of loyalty “form a consistent body of ethical as well as religious opinion and teaching, verifiable, in its main outlines, in terms of human experience, and capable of furnishing a foundation for a defensible form of metaphysical idealism”. (The Problem of Christianity, Vol. 1, p. ix)

Royce never was an old-style absolutist in either method or ontology but there were those among his peers who only came to recognize this in his later thought. Some of these believed he had changed his view in some fundamental way. Royce's ethics and religious philosophy certainly matured, but the basic philosophical framework did not shift. Having provided throughout his career an idealistic way of grasping the Will, in contrast to Schopenhauer's pessimistic treatment, it remained for Royce to rescue Pauline Christianity, in its universalized and modernized form, from the critique of Nietzsche and others who tended to understand will in terms of power and who had claimed that the historic doctrine was no longer believable to the modern mind. Striking in this work is the temporal account of the Holy Spirit, the Holy Catholic Church and the communion of saints as a universal community. This community is a process of mutually interpretive activity which requires shared memory and hope. In seeking to show the reality of the invisible community, perhaps Royce was seeking communion with his departed son Christopher and his close friend William James, both of whom had died in 1910. Royce kept these and other personal tragedies far from the text of his published work, but the grieving certainly affected and deepened his insight and perhaps exaggerated the quality of his hope.

Two key influences on the thought of Royce were Charles Sanders Peirce and William James. In fact, it can be argued that a major way Peirce's ideas entered the American academy is through Royce's teaching and writing, and eventually that of his students. Peirce also reviewed Royce's The Religious Aspect of Philosophy (1885). Some have claimed that Peirce also supervised Royce's Ph.D., but that is impossible as Peirce arrived at Johns Hopkins in 1879.

== Logic ==
Royce influenced the Harvard school of logic, Boolean algebra, and foundations of mathematics. His own logic, philosophy of logic, and philosophy of mathematics were influenced by Charles Peirce and Alfred Kempe.

Students who learned logic at Royce's feet include Clarence Irving Lewis, who went on to pioneer modal logic, Edward Vermilye Huntington, the first to axiomatize Boolean algebra, and Henry M. Sheffer, known for his eponymous stroke. Many of Royce's writings on logic and mathematics are critical of the extensional logic of Principia Mathematica, by Bertrand Russell and Alfred North Whitehead, and can be read as an alternative to their approach. Many of his writings on logic and scientific method, are reproduced in Royce (1951, 1961).

== Psychology ==
Royce's philosophy of man as the product of the interrelationship of individual ego and social other laid the foundations for the writings of George Herbert Mead.

Royce saw the self as the product of a process of social interaction. Royce wrote: "In origin, then, the empirical Ego is secondary to our social experiences. In literal social life, the Ego is always known in contrast to the Alter".

He also considered that the social self could itself become diseased, seeing delusions of grandeur or persecution as distortions of everyday self-consciousness, with its concern for social standing and reflected place in the world.

Royce was involved with the American Society for Psychical Research, and researched telepathy. In 1889 he served as Vice-President of the society.

Erving Goffman considered that his pioneering work of 1895 on the distortions in the subjective sense of self which take place in the grandiosity of mania was unsurpassed three quarters of a century later.

== Legacy ==
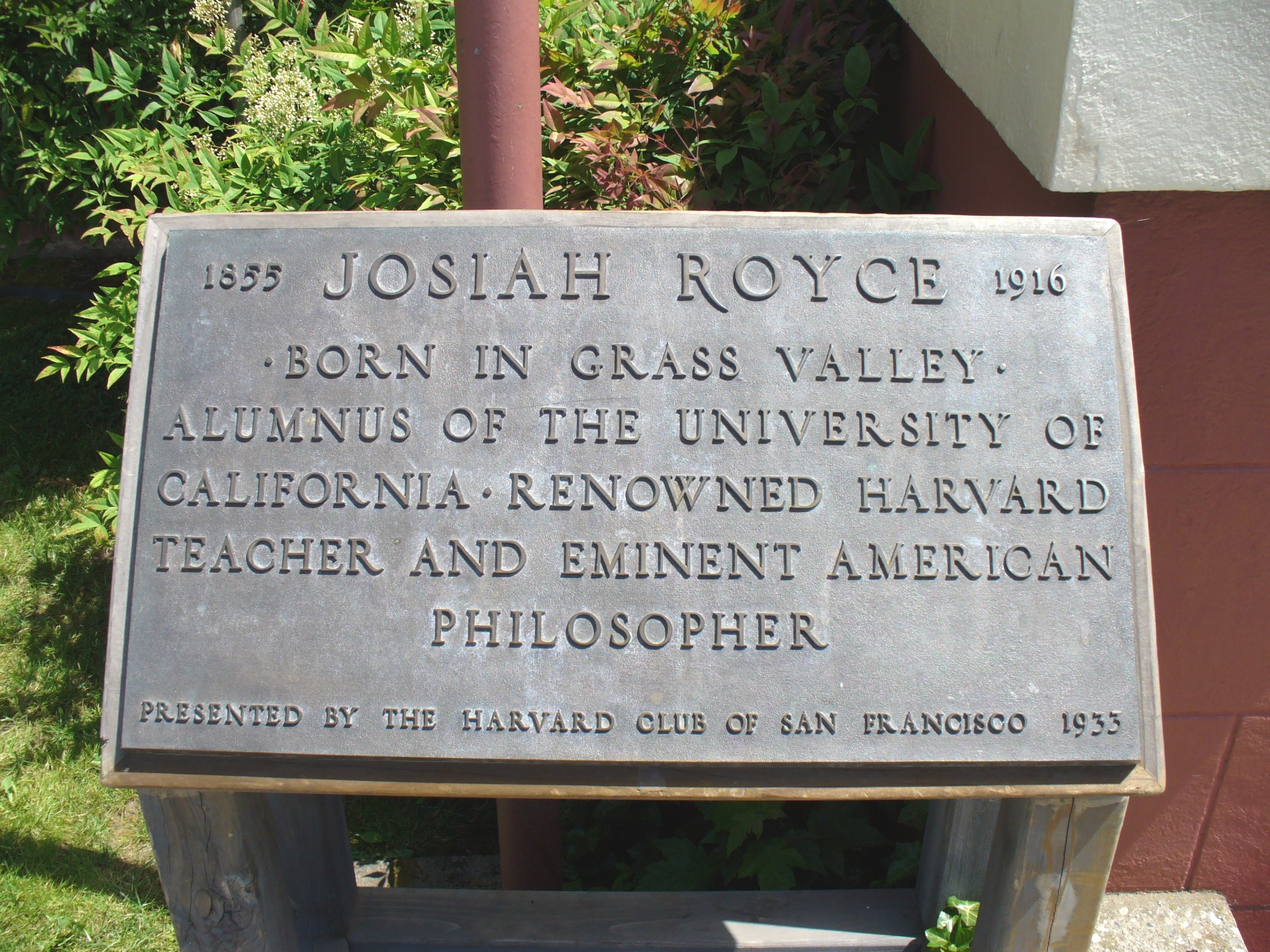
Inscription honoring Royce at the entrance to the Grass Valley Public Library in California.

- The Royce School, which later merged with Anna Head's School for Girls to become the Head-Royce School
- Royce Hall, one of the original four buildings at UCLA
- The Grass Valley Public Library, renamed in Royce's honor in 1933
- Josiah Royce Hall, Fresno High School
- Royce House, a dormitory, one of the Alumni Memorial Residences on the Homewood Campus of the Johns Hopkins University in Baltimore, Maryland
- Royce Peak, a summit in The Sierra Nevada mountains

== Selected publications ==
- 1885. The Religious Aspect of Philosophy
- 1886 California – From the Conquest in 1846 to the Second Vigilance Committee in San Francisco: A Study of American Character. Boston and New York: Houghton, Mifflin and Company.
- 1887. The Feud of Oakfield Creek: A Novel of California Life. Boston and New York: Houghton, Mifflin and Company.
- 1892. The Spirit of Modern Philosophy
- 1897. The Conception of God, a philosophical discussion concerning the Nature of the Divine Idea as a Demonstrable Reality
- 1898. Studies of Good and Evil: a series of Essays upon Problems of Philosophy and of Life
- 1899. The World and the Individual First Series, The Four Historical Conceptions of Being
- 1900. The Conception of Immortality
- 1901. The World and the Individual Second Series, Nature, Man, and the Moral Order
- 1903. Outlines of Psychology: an elementary treatise, with some practical applications
- 1904. Herbert Spencer: An Estimate and a Review
- 1908. The Philosophy of Loyalty
- 1908. Race Questions, Provincialism, and Other American Problems
- 1909. What is Vital in Christianity?
- 1912. The Sources of Religious Insight. 2001 ed., Catholic Univ. of America Press. online edition
- 1912. William James, and Other Essays on the Philosophy of Life
- 1913. The Problem of Christianity. 2001 ed., Catholic Univ. of America Press. online edition (Volume One) Volume Two
- 1914. War and Insurance Macmillan.
- 1916. The Hope of the Great Community Macmillan.
- 1919. Lectures on Modern Idealism Ed. by J. Loewenberg. Yale University Press.
- 1920. Fugitive Essays
- 1951. Royce's Logical Essays: Collected Logical Essays of Josiah Royce Ed. by D.S. Robinson. Dubuque, IA: W. C. Brown Co.
- 1961. Principles of Logic. Philosophical Library.
- 1963. Josiah Royce's Seminar 1913–1914: As Recorded in the Notebooks of Harry T. Costello. Ed. by G.C. Smith. Rutgers University Press.
- 2005 (1969). The Basic Writings of Josiah Royce, 2 vols. Ed. by J. J. McDermott. Fordham University Press.
- 1970. The Letters of Josiah Royce. Ed. by J. Clendenning. University of Chicago Press.
- 1998. Metaphysics / Josiah Royce: His Philosophy 9 Course of 1915–1916. Ed. by R. Hocking and F. Oppenheim. State University of New York Press.
- 2001. Josiah Royce's Late Writings: A Collection of Unpublished and Scattered Works, 2 vols. Ed. by F. Oppenheim. Thoemmes Press.
- 2021. Josiah Royce's 1909 Pittsburgh Loyalty Lectures. Ed. by M. A. Foust. Cambridge Scholars Publishing.
