= Objective idealism =

Idealistic metaphysics

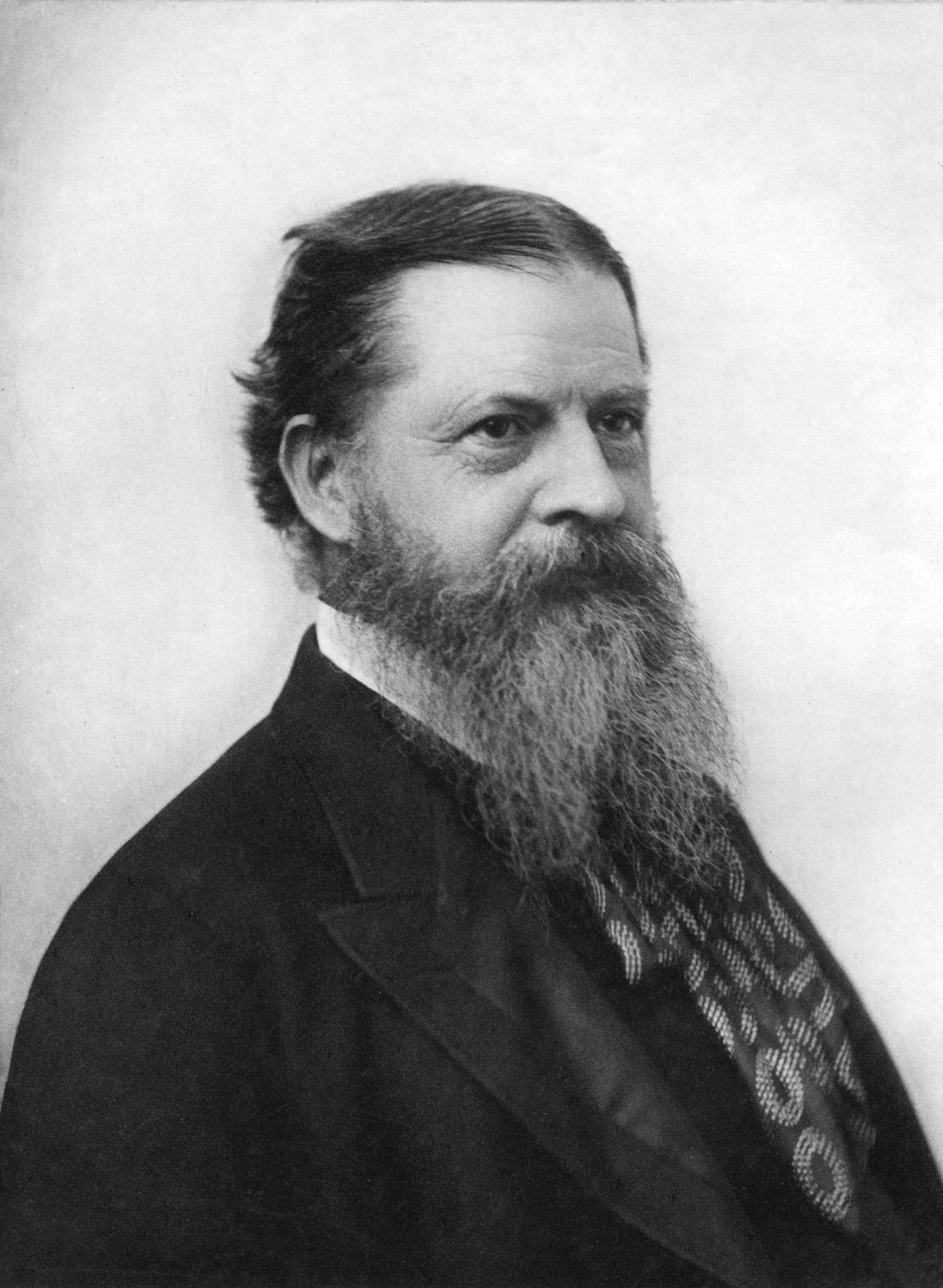
Charles Sanders Peirce is among the most prominent modern proponents of objective idealism.

Objective idealism is a philosophical theory that affirms the ideal and spiritual nature of the world and conceives of the idea of which the world is made as the objective and rational form in reality rather than as subjective content of the mind or mental representation. Objective idealism thus differs both from materialism, which holds that the external world is independent of cognizing minds and that mental processes and ideas are by-products of physical events, and from subjective idealism, which conceives of reality as totally dependent on the consciousness of the subject and therefore relative to the subject itself.

Objective idealism starts with Plato's theory of forms, which maintains that objectively existing but non-material "ideas" give form to reality, thus shaping its basic building blocks.

Objective idealism has also been defined as a form of metaphysical idealism that accepts naïve realism (the view that empirical objects exist objectively) but rejects epiphenomenalist materialism (according to which the mind and spiritual values have emerged due to material causes), as opposed to subjective idealism, which denies that material objects exist independently of human perception and thus stands opposed to both realism and naturalism.

== In German idealism ==
Within German idealism, objective idealism identifies with the philosophy of Friedrich Schelling. According to Schelling, the rational or spiritual elements of reality are supposed to give conceptual structure to reality and ultimately constitute reality, to the point that nature and mind, matter and concept, are essentially identical: their distinction is merely psychological and depends on our predisposition to distinguish the "outside us" (nature, world) from the "in us" (mind, spirit). Within that tradition of philosophical thought, the entire world manifests itself through ideas and is governed by purposes or ends: regardless of the existence of a self-conscious subject, all reality is a manifestation of reason.

== Charles Peirce ==
Philosopher Charles Sanders Peirce defined his own version of objective idealism as follows:

The one intelligible theory of the universe is that of objective idealism, that matter is effete mind, inveterate habits becoming physical laws (Peirce, CP 6.25).

By "objective idealism", Peirce meant that material objects such as organisms have evolved out of mind, that is, out of feelings ("such as pain, blue, cheerfulness") that are immediately present to consciousness. Contrary to Hegel, who identified mind with conceptual thinking or reason, Peirce identified it with feeling. He claimed that at the origins of the world there was "a chaos of unpersonalized feelings", i.e., feelings that were not located in any individual subject. Therefore, in the 1890s Peirce's philosophy referred to itself as objective idealism because it held that the mind comes first and the world is essentially mind (idealism) and the mind is independent of individuals (objectivism).

== Notable proponents ==
- Plato
- Friedrich Schelling
- Georg Wilhelm Friedrich Hegel
- Charles Sanders Peirce
- Bernard Bosanquet
- Josiah Royce
