= Nevada City School District =

School district in California, United States

Address
- 800 Hoover Lane Nevada City, California, 95959; United States

District information
- Type: Public
- Grades: K–8
- NCES District ID: 0626820

Students and staff
- Students: 696 (2020–2021)
- Teachers: 34.29 (FTE)
- Staff: 35.92 (FTE)
- Student–teacher ratio: 20.3:1

Other information
- Website: www.ncsd.school

Nevada City School District is a public school district based in Nevada County, California, United States.

The district has two schools: Deer Creek Elementary School and Seven Hills Intermediate School.
