= Richard Hocking =

American philosopher (1906-2001)

- Born: 26 August 1906; Berkeley, California
- Died: 11 March 2001 (aged 94); Madison, New Hampshire

Philosophical work
- Era: 21st-century philosophy
- Region: Western philosophy

Richard Boyle O'Reilly Hocking (26 August 1906 – 11 March 2001) was an American philosopher and a professor of philosophy at Emory University. He was the son of William Ernest Hocking and grandson of John Boyle O'Reilly. He was a president of the Metaphysical Society of America (1970).
