= North Bloomfield, California =

Unincorporated community in California, United States

North Bloomfield
- Unincorporated community
- Location of North Bloomfield in California
- Coordinates: 39°22′06″N 120°53′58″W
- Country: United States
- State: California
- County: Nevada
- Elevation: 3,287 ft (1,002 m)
- Time zone: UTC-8 (Pacific (PST))
  - Summer (DST): UTC-7 (PDT)
- Area code: 530

North Bloomfield (previously, Bloomfield, Humbug, and Humbug City) is a small unincorporated community located in Nevada County, California.

It is in the Sierra Nevada, 10 miles (16 km) northeast of Nevada City.

== History ==
Settled in 1852 as a mining town of the California Gold Rush, it was originally named Humbug after the creek of the same name. As the settlement grew, it was renamed Humbug City, and then the more dignified Bloomfield. The settlement thrived during Malakoff Diggins mining days. When a post office was established on June 1, 1857, residents selected the current name to differentiate the town from Bloomfield, California.

In 1857, the population was approximately 500. Three years later, the North Bloomfield Mining and Gravel Company arrived and began hydraulic mining operations. By 1876, the population swelled to 2,000. But in 1884, when hydraulic mining ended because of Woodruff v. North Bloomfield Gravel Mining Company, a lawsuit by Sacramento area farmers, North Bloomfield became an uninhabited San Juan Ridge ghost town.

In the present day, the town of North Bloomfield is contained within the Malakoff Diggins State Historic Park. Some of the town's original buildings remain and a few have been reconstructed:

- Skidmore House
- E Clampus Vitus Building
- McKillicam & Mobley General Store
- St. Columncille’s Catholic Church

The post office was open from 1857 to 1942, moving once in 1875.

== See also ==
- Malakoff Diggins State Historic Park
- Mining communities of the California Gold Rush
