= North Bloomfield Mining and Gravel Company =

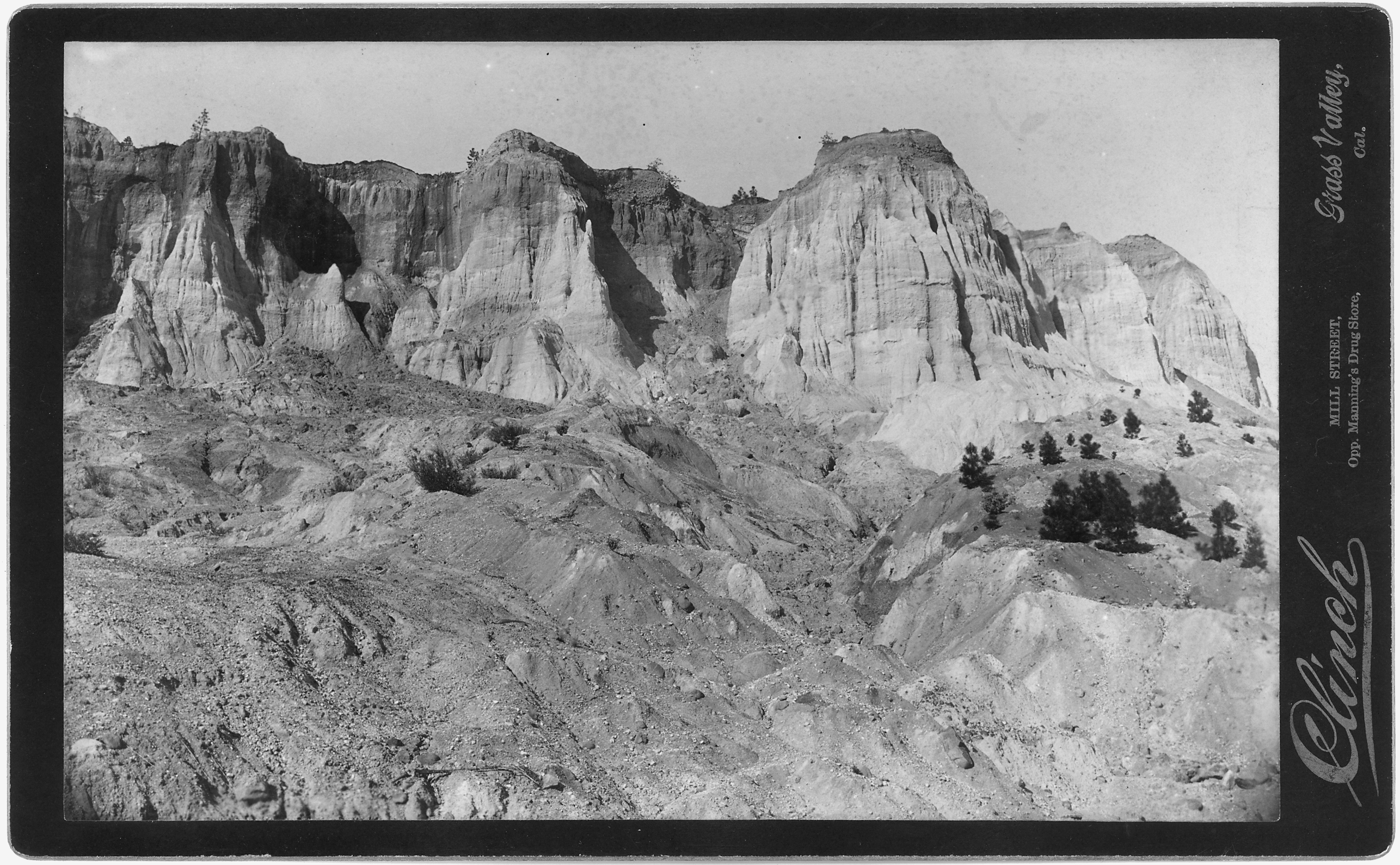
- North Bloomfield Mine, ca. 1891

- Location within California
- 39°22′7″N 120°54′48.79″W
- Location: Malakoff Diggins State Historic Park; North Bloomfield, California

History
- Built: 1866, founded 1874, Malakoff Mine tunnel built

Site notes
- Architect(s): Hamilton Smith, Chief Engineer
- Architectural style: 7,800 feet (2,400 m) long drainage tunnel through solid bedrock
- Governing body: State Department of Parks and Recreation

California Historical Landmark
- Designated: 1972-01-20
- Reference no.: 852

The North Bloomfield Mining and Gravel Company of North Bloomfield, California, was established in 1866 and operated a hydraulic gold-mining operation at the Malakoff Mine subsequent to the California Gold Rush. In its day, no other company's operations matched North Bloomfield Mining and Gravel Company in size or expense. The company operated until 1910. In the years prior, its profits and procedures had been reduced due to the landmark ruling of Woodruff v. North Bloomfield Gravel Mining Company.

The mine is located within Malakoff Diggins State Historic Park, 16 miles (26 km) east of Highway 49 on Tyler Foote's Crossing Road, and 28 miles (45 km) north of Nevada City, California. The company office is still standing.

== History ==
The North Bloomfield Mining and Gravel Company was owned by 30 investors from San Francisco, led by railroad baron Lester I. Robinson, and William Ralston, a silver miner from Sun Mountain in Nevada. The company's water rights were the same watershed as Summit Water and Irrigation Company's but lower down on Canyon Creek. The principal reservoir was at Bowman Lake, while others included Crooked, Island, Middle, Round, English/Rudyard, Sawmill, and Shotgun Reservoirs. The company's main canal was the Bloomfield Ditch, but, according to Superintendent L.L. Meyers, only a small fraction of the ditch's water was used for irrigation and most was used for mine operations.

The company had numerous operations in Nevada County, including Union Diggings at Columbia Hill, but those at Malakoff Mine were the most notable. Completed in 1874-11-15, the North Bloomfield Mining and Gravel Company carved a 7,800 feet (2,400 m) long drainage tunnel through solid bedrock at Malakoff Mine. After tunnel completion, the company reached its peak processing of 50,000 tons of gravel each day by operating seven giant monitors twenty-four hours a day, seven days a week. In the company's 1879 year-end report, the company's president hailed a major improvement as "... electric light of 12,000 candle intensity ... to facilitate mining operations at night better than the pitch bonfires heretofore used."

== Sawyer Decision ==
The tailings, dumped into the Yuba River, destroyed farm land as far west as Sacramento, creating California's first major environmental controversy. in September 1882, Edwards Woodruff, a disgruntled New Yorker who owned farmland in Marysville, brought suit in Woodruff v. North Bloomfield Gravel Mining Company, an anti-debris lawsuit. By June 1883, the case was at trial. On 1884-01-07, Judge Lorenzo Sawyer handed down what became known as the Sawyer Decision, among the first environmental decisions in the United States. While North Bloomfield Mining and Gravel Company was notable for operating the world's largest hydraulic gold mine in 1884, the Sawyer Decision abruptly ended hydraulic mining in Gold Country soon after. The tailings can still be found on the river as the Yuba Goldfields.

== Other mining companies in the region ==
- Birdseye Creek Mining Company, between You Bet and Red Dog, north of the Bear River
- Excelsior Water and Mining Company, around Smartville
- Gold Run Ditch and Mining Company, at Dutch Flat
- Milton Mining and Water Company, between North San Juan and French Corral
- Polar Star and Southern Cross Company, around Bear River
- Spring Valley Mining Company, above Oroville on the north fork of Feather River
- Summit Water and Irrigation Company, North Bloomfield
- Union Gravel Mining Company

== California Historical Landmark ==
North Bloomfield Mining and Gravel Company was registered as California Historical Landmark No. 852 in 1972-01-20. The plaque is situated at the park diggins overlook, affixed to a rock wall, and states:

NORTH BLOOMFIELD MINING AND GRAVEL COMPANY
"This was a major hydraulic gold-mining operation in California. It boasted a vast system of canals and flumes, its 7,800-foot drainage tunnel was termed a feat of engineering skill. It was the principal defendant in an anti-debris lawsuit settled in 1884 by Judge Lorenzo Sawyer's famous decision, which created control that virtually ended hydraulic mining in California."
CALIFORNIA REGISTERED HISTORICAL LANDMARK NO. 852
Plaque placed by the State Department of Parks and Recreation in cooperation with the Malakoff Citizens' Advisory Committee and E Clampus Vitus No. 10, June 11, 1972.

== See also ==
- California Historical Landmarks in Nevada County
