= Placer mining =

Technique of mining stream bed deposits for minerals

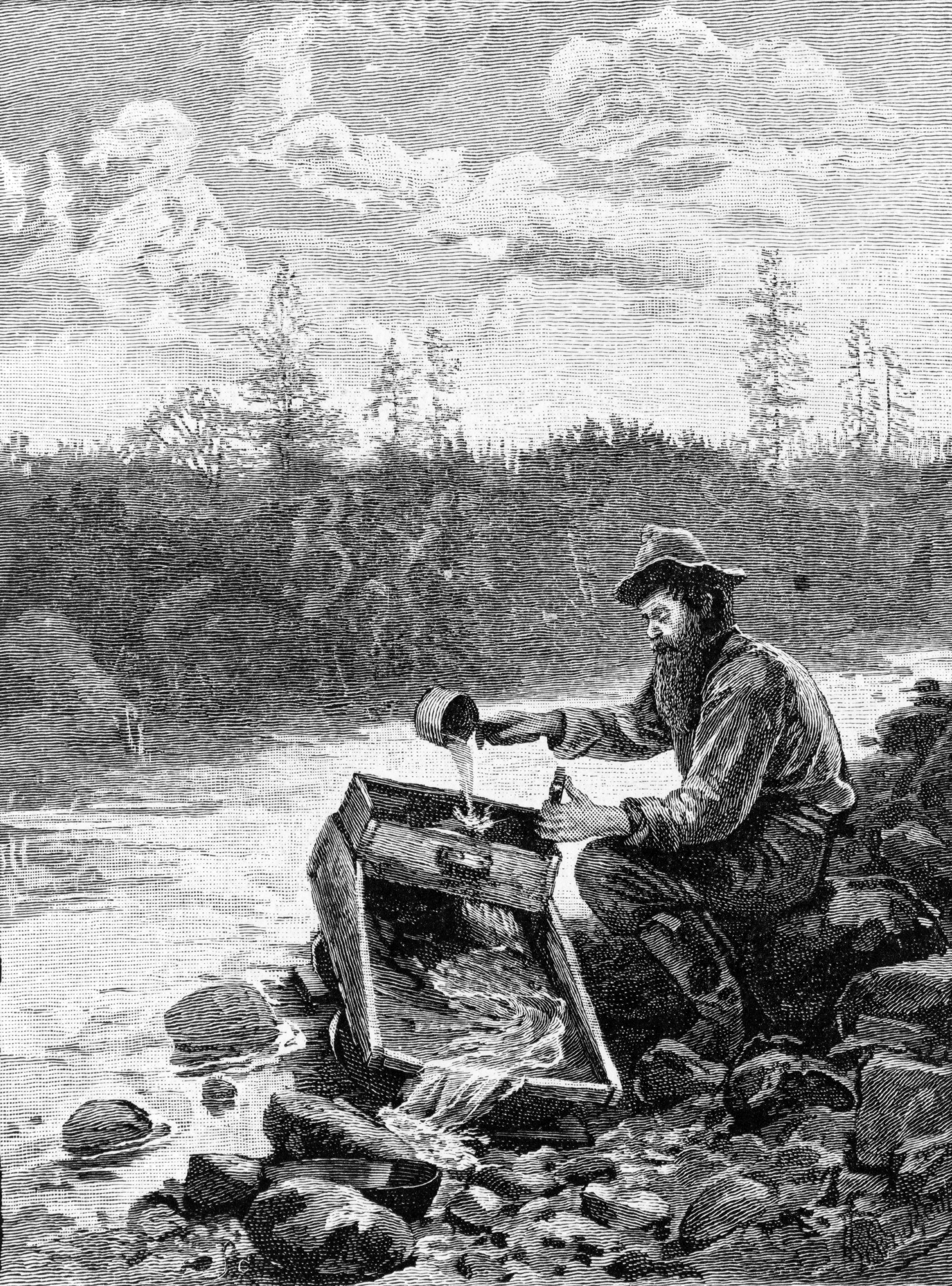
19th-century miner pouring water into a rocker box which, when rocked back and forth, will help separate gold dust from the alluvium

Placer mining (/ˈplæsər/) is the mining of stream bed deposits for minerals. This may be done by open-pit mining or by various surface excavating equipment or tunneling equipment.

Placer mining is frequently used for precious metal deposits (particularly gold, and platinum to a much lesser extent) and gemstones, both of which are often found in alluvial deposits—deposits of sand and gravel in modern or ancient stream beds, or occasionally glacial deposits. The metal or gemstones, having been moved by stream flow from an original source such as a vein, are typically only a minuscule portion of the total deposit. Since gems and heavy metals like gold are considerably denser than sand, they tend to accumulate at the base of placer deposits.

Placer deposits can be as young as a few years old, such as the Canadian Queen Charlotte beach gold placer deposits, or billions of years old like the Elliot Lake uranium paleoplacer within the Huronian Supergroup in Canada.

The containing material in an alluvial placer mine may be too loose to safely mine by tunnelling, though it is possible where the ground is permanently frozen. Where water under pressure is available, it may be used to mine, move, and separate the precious material from the deposit, a method known as hydraulic mining, hydraulic sluicing or hydraulicking.

== Etymology ==
The word placer derives from the Spanish placer, meaning shoal or alluvial/sand deposit, from plassa (place) from Medieval Latin placea (place) the origin word for "place" and "plaza" in English. The word in Spanish is thus derived from placea and refers directly to an alluvial or glacial deposit of sand or gravel.

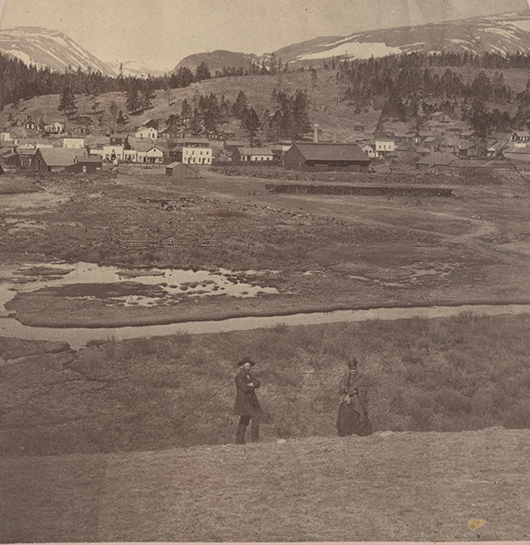
A placer mine in Alma, Colorado in 1880

An alternative etymology derives the English word from American Spanish placer (placer, sandbank), from earlier placel, apparently from obsolete Portuguese placel (placer, sandbank).

== History ==
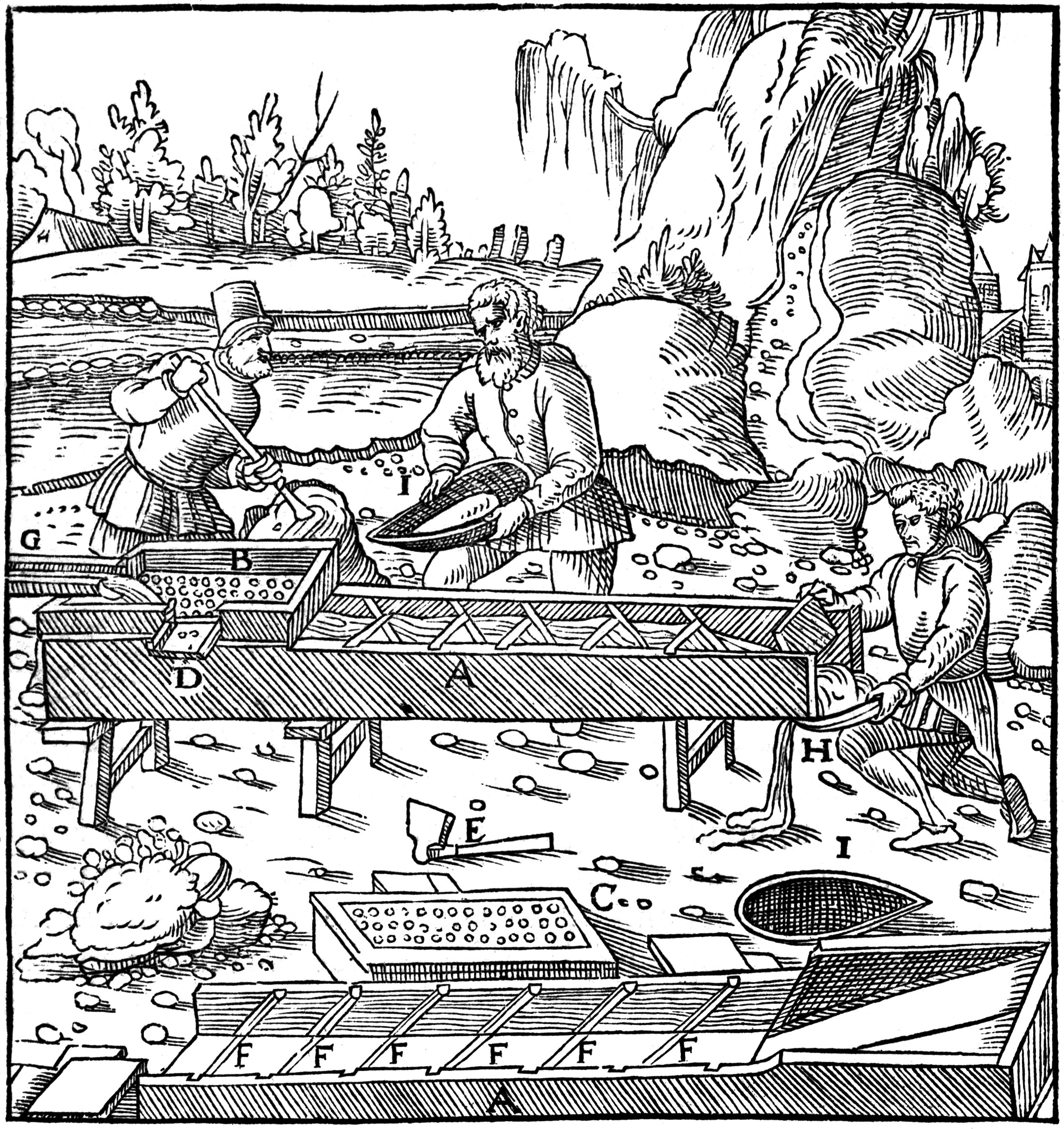
Plate depicting placer mining from the 1556 book De re metallica

Placers supplied most of the gold for a large part of the ancient world. Hydraulic mining methods such as hushing were used widely by the Romans across their empire, but especially in the gold fields of northern Spain after its conquest by Augustus in 25 BC. One of the largest sites was at Las Médulas, where seven 30 mile long aqueducts were used to work the alluvial gold deposits through the first century AD. (Note: Inclusions of platinum-group metals in a very large proportion of gold items indicate that the gold was largely derived from placer or alluvial deposits. Platinum group metals are seldom found with gold in hardrock reef or vein deposits.)

In North America, placer mining was famous in the context of several gold rushes, particularly the California Gold Rush and the Colorado Gold Rush, the Fraser Canyon Gold Rush and the Klondike Gold Rush.

Placer mining continues in many areas of the world as a source of diamonds, industrial minerals and metals, gems (in Myanmar and Sri Lanka), platinum, and of gold (in Yukon, Alaska and British Columbia).

== Deposits ==
An area well protected from the flow of water is a great location to find gold. Gold is very dense and is often found in a stream bed. Many different gold deposits are dealt with in different ways. Placer deposits attract many prospectors because their costs are very low. There are many different places gold could be placed, such as a residual, alluvial, and a bench deposit.

=== Residual ===
Residual deposits are more common where there has been weathering on rocks and where there hasn't been water. They are deposits which have not been washed away yet or been moved. The residual usually lies at the site of the lode. This type of deposit undergoes rock weathering.

=== Alluvial ===
Alluvial or eluvial deposits are the most common type of placer gold, and are often the richest. They contain pieces of gold that have been washed away from the lode by the force of water, and have been deposited in sediment in or near watercourses or former watercourses. Therefore, they are mostly found in valleys or flood plains.

=== Bench ===
Bench deposits are created when gold reaches a stream bed. Gold accumulations in an old stream bed that are high are called bench deposits. They can be found on higher slopes that drain into valleys. Dry stream beds (benches) can be situated far from other water sources and can sometimes be found on mountaintops. Today, many miners focus their activities on bench deposits.

=== Deep leads ===
Deep leads are created when a former stream bed is covered over by later sediments or by igneous rock from a volcanic eruption. Examples existed in the goldfields of Gulgong, Creswick, and Maryborough in Australia. The gold bearing gravel or 'wash' is accessed by shafts and drives, similar to underground hard rock mining techniques, but is typically processed as if alluvial gold. The heat associated with an igneous lava flow, in some cases, altered the gold bearing gravel so that it needed to be crushed first to extract the gold; an example of this kind of deep lead was found at Forest Reefs, also in Australia. If vegetation was buried along with the old stream, by a volcanic eruption, the effect of heat and decay upon that buried vegetation can result in the presence of harmful amounts of carbonic acid gas (H_{2}CO_{3}), as occurred in the deep lead deposit at Creswick. Another difficulty encountered in deep lead mining is the presence of large volumes of subterranean water in the deep lead.

== Methods ==
A number of methods are used to mine placer gold and gems, both in terms of extracting the minerals from the ground, and separating it from the non-gold or non-gems.

=== Panning ===
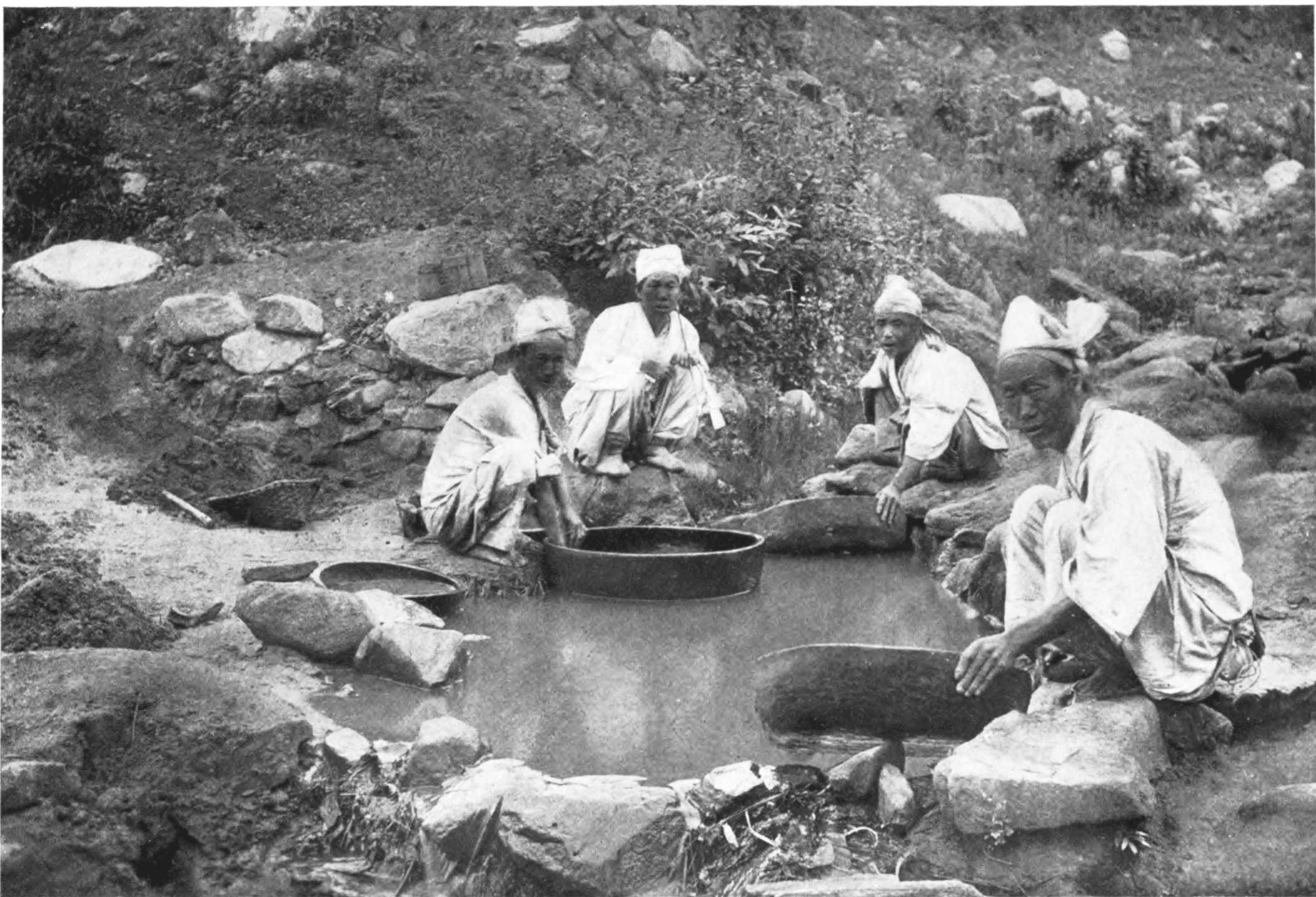
Panning for gold in Korea, c. 1900

The simplest technique to extract gold from placer ore is panning. This technique has been dated back to at least the Roman Empire. In panning, some mined ore is placed in a large metal or plastic pan, combined with a generous amount of water, and agitated so that the gold particles, being of higher density than the other material, settle to the bottom of the pan. The lighter gangue material such as sand, mud and gravel are then washed over the side of the pan, leaving the gold behind. Once a placer deposit is located by gold panning, the miner usually shifts to equipment that can treat volumes of sand and gravel more quickly and efficiently. Gold panning was commonly used on its own during the California gold rush; however, it is rarely profitable anymore since even an expert gold prospector can only process approximately one cubic yard of material for every 10 hours of work.

=== Rocker ===
A rocker box (or "cradle") is capable of greater volume than a gold pan; however, its production is still limited when compared to other methods of placer mining. It is only capable of processing about 3 or 4 yards of gravel a day. It is more portable and requires less infrastructure than a sluice box, being fed not by a sluice but by hand. The box sits on rockers, which when rocked separates out the gold, and the practice was referred to as "rocking the golden baby". A typical rocker box is approximately 42 inches long, 16 inches wide and 12 inches deep with a removable tray towards the top, where gold is captured. The rocker was commonly used throughout North America during the early gold rush, but its popularity diminished as other methods that could handle a larger volume became more common.

=== Sluice box ===
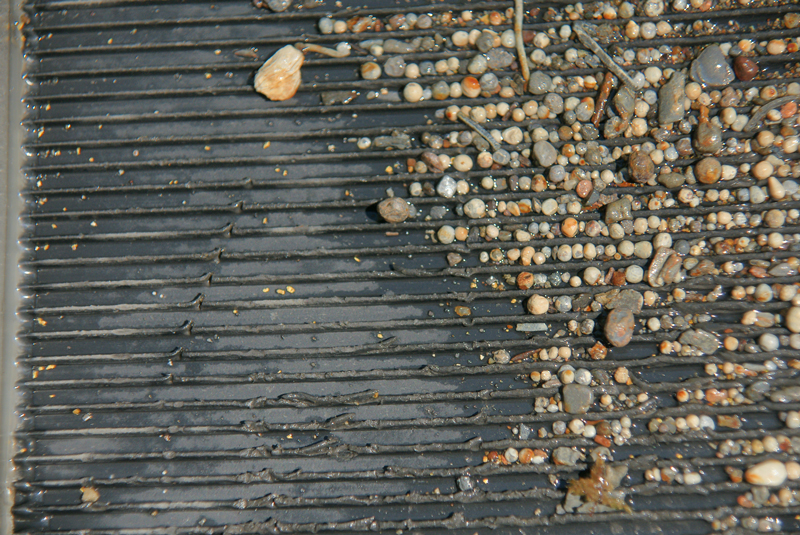
Riffles in a sluice box. The small specks are gold, the larger ones are merely pebbles

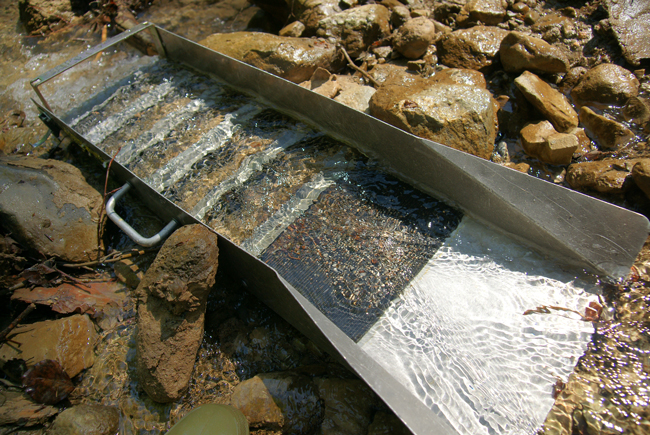
A modern sluice box made of metal; in its base are the riffles used to catch gold settling to the bottom

The same principle may be employed on a larger scale by constructing a short sluice box, with barriers along the bottom called riffles to trap the heavier gold particles as water washes them and the other material along the box. This method better suits excavation with shovels or similar implements to feed ore into the device. Sluice boxes can be as short as a few feet, or more than ten feet (a common term for one that is over six feet $\pm$ is a "Long Tom"). While they are capable of handling a larger volume of material than simpler methods such as the rocker box or gold panning, this can come at the cost of efficiency, since conventional sluice boxes have been found to recover only about 40% of the gold that they process.

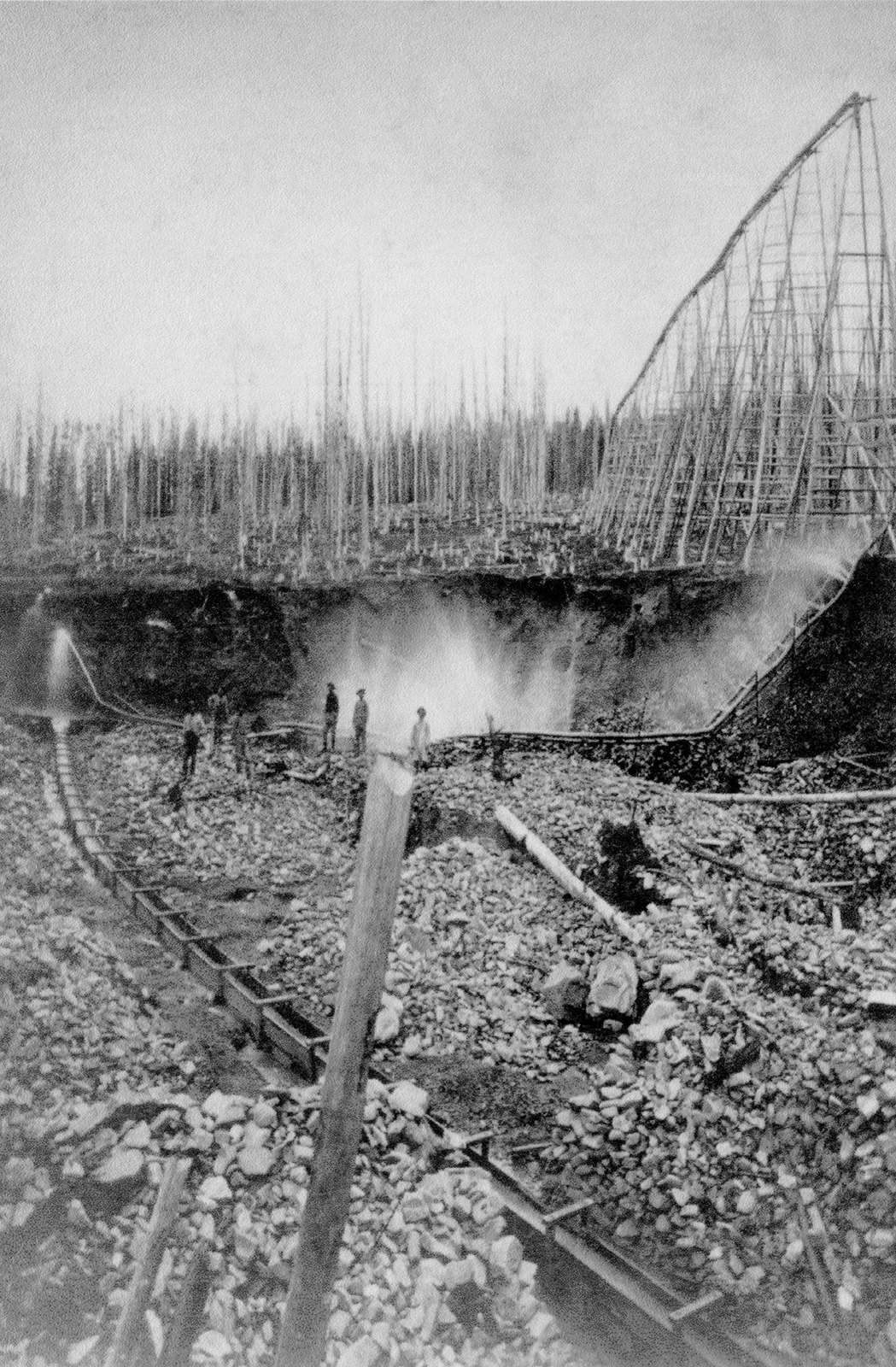
Placer mines in Park County, Colorado, 1870s. A long sluice box runs along the mine.

The sluice box was used extensively during the California gold rush for larger scale operations. When streams became increasingly depleted, the grizzly and undercurrent variants of the sluice box were developed. The grizzly is a set of parallel bars placed at a 45-degree angle over the main sluice box, which filter out larger material. The undercurrent variety includes additional, auxiliary sluice boxes where material is initially filtered. It then travels through a trough into the primary sluice box where it is filtered again. Both the grizzly and undercurrent are designed to increase efficiency, and were often used in combination.

=== Dry washing ===
Sluicing is only effective in areas where there is a sufficient water supply, and is impractical in arid areas. Alternative methods developed that used the blowing of air to separate out gold from sand. One of the more common methods of dry washing is the Mexican dry wash. This method involves placing gravel on a riffle board with a bellows placed underneath it. The bellows is then used to blow air through the board in order to remove the lighter material from the heavier gold. The amount of gravel that can be processed using the Mexican dry wash technique varies from 1 1/2 to 4 cubic yards per day, and can be processed at a maximum efficiency of 80%. Another form of dry washing is "winnowing". This method was most commonly used by Spanish miners in America, and only requires a blanket and a box with a screen on the bottom. The material is first filtered through the box so only the finer material is placed onto the blanket. The material on the blanket is then flung into the air so that any breeze can blow away the lighter material and leave the gold behind. While this method is extremely simple and requires very few materials, it is also slow and inefficient.

=== Trommel ===
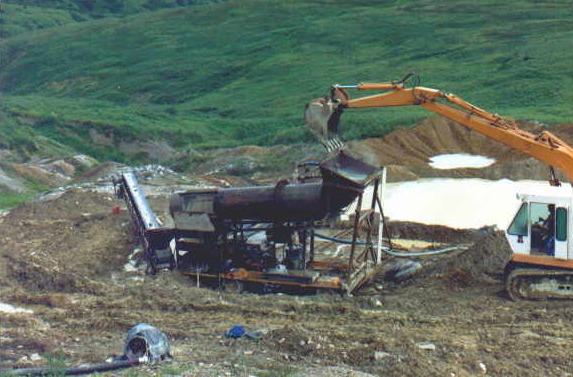
Trommel at the Potato Patch, Blue Ribbon Mine, Alaska

A trommel is composed of a slightly inclined rotating metal tube (the 'scrubber section') with a screen at its discharge end. Lifter bars, sometimes in the form of bolted in angle iron, are attached to the interior of the scrubber section. The ore is fed into the elevated end of the trommel. Water, often under pressure, is provided to the scrubber and screen sections and the combination of water and mechanical action frees the valuable heavy minerals from the lighter gravel. The mineral bearing ore that passes through the screen is then further concentrated in smaller devices such as sluices and jigs. The larger pieces of ore that do not pass through the screen can be carried to a waste stack by a conveyor.

=== Gold dredge ===
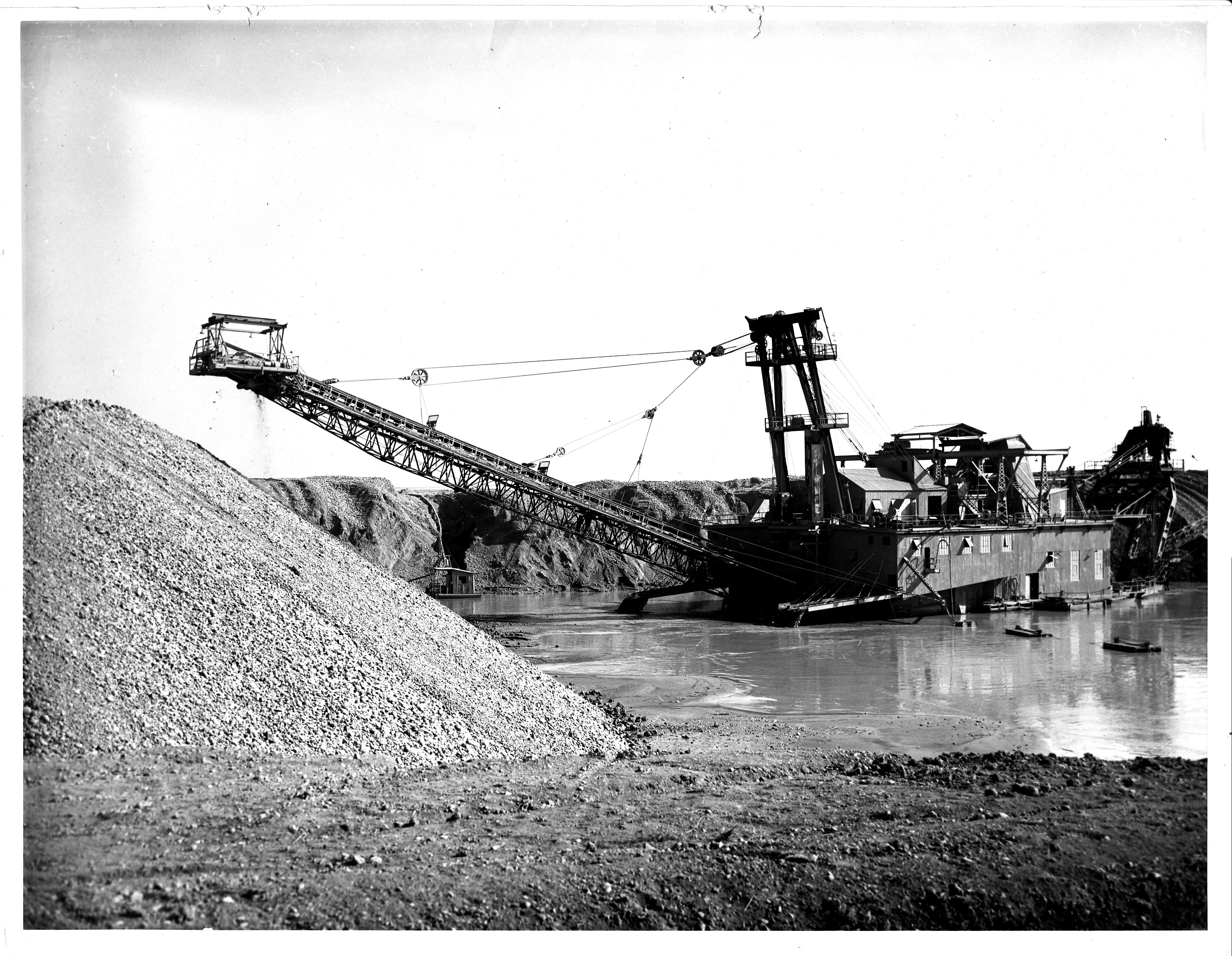
The Natomas No. 6 gold dredge in operation in 1958 in Folsom, California

Large-scale sifting of placer gold from large volumes of alluvial deposits can be done by use of mechanical dredges. These dredges were originally very large boats capable of processing massive amounts of material; however, as the gold has become increasingly depleted in the most easily accessible areas, smaller and more maneuverable dredges have become much more common. These smaller dredges commonly operate by sucking water and gravel up through long hoses using a pump, where the gold can then be separated using more traditional methods such as a sluice box.

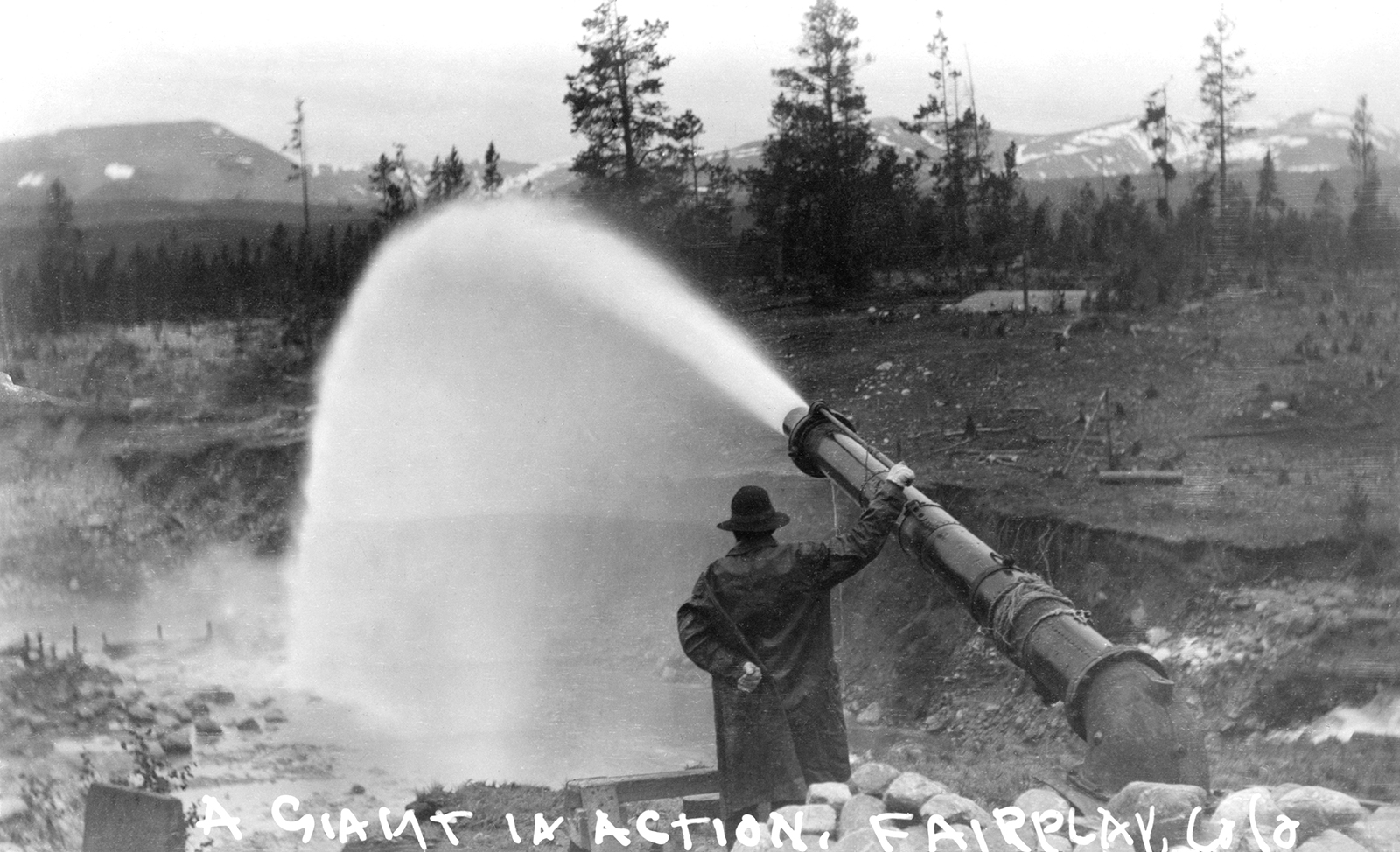
Placer mine worker streams high pressure water to assist with mining operations in Park County, Colorado, early 1900s

=== Underground mining ===
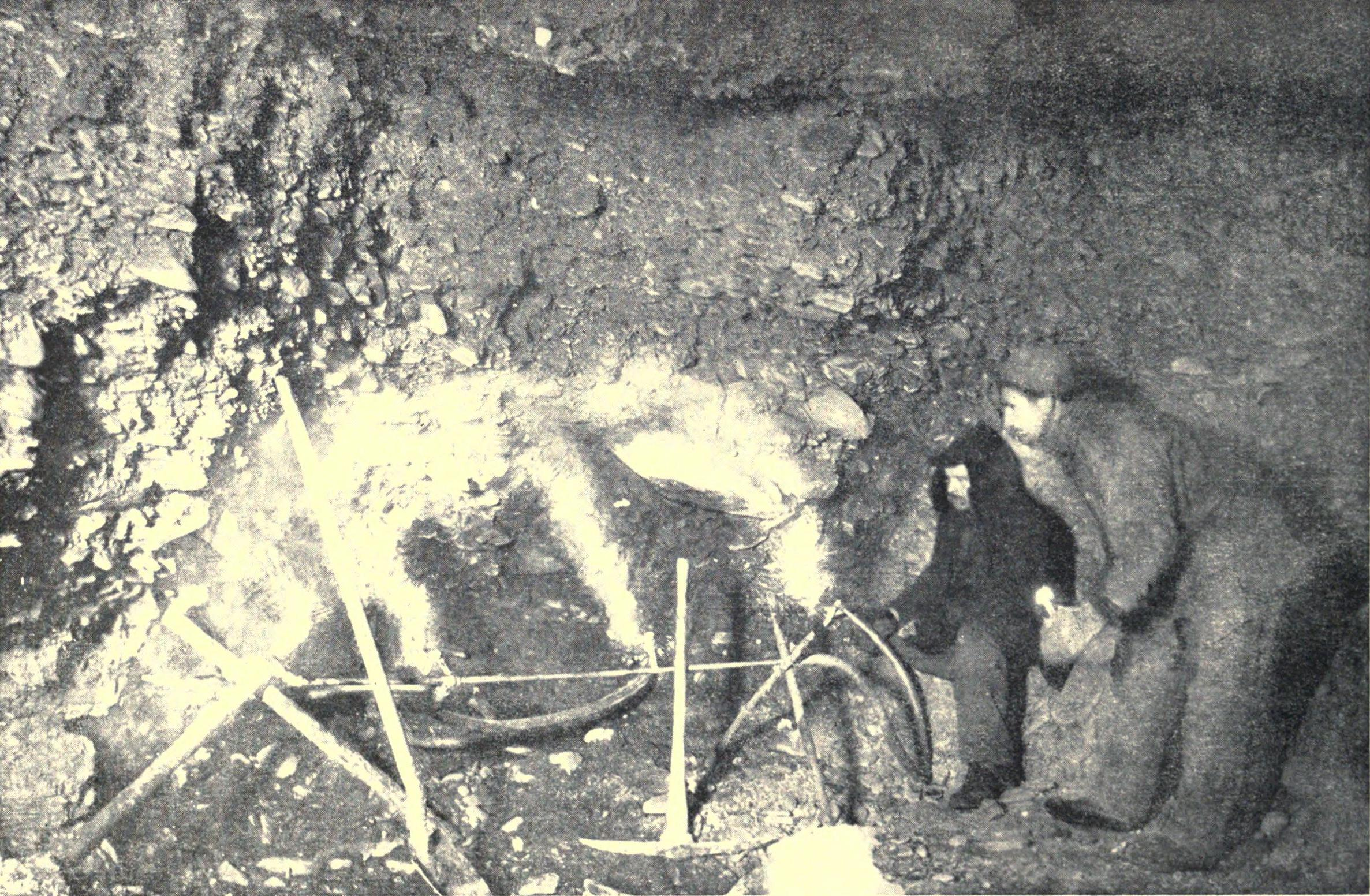
Miners using jets of steam to melt the permafrost in an underground gold mine

In areas where the ground is permanently frozen, such as in Siberia, Alaska, and the Yukon, placer deposits may be mined underground. As the frozen ground is otherwise too hard and firm to mine by hand, historically fires were built so as to thaw the ground before digging it. Later methods involve blasting jets of steam ("points") into the frozen deposits.

Deep leads are accessed by techniques similar to conventional underground mining.

== Environmental effects ==
Although this procedure is not required, the process water may be continuously recycled and the ore from which the sought-after minerals have been extracted (the "tailings") can be reclaimed. While these recycling and reclamation processes are more common in modern placer mining operations they are still not universally done.

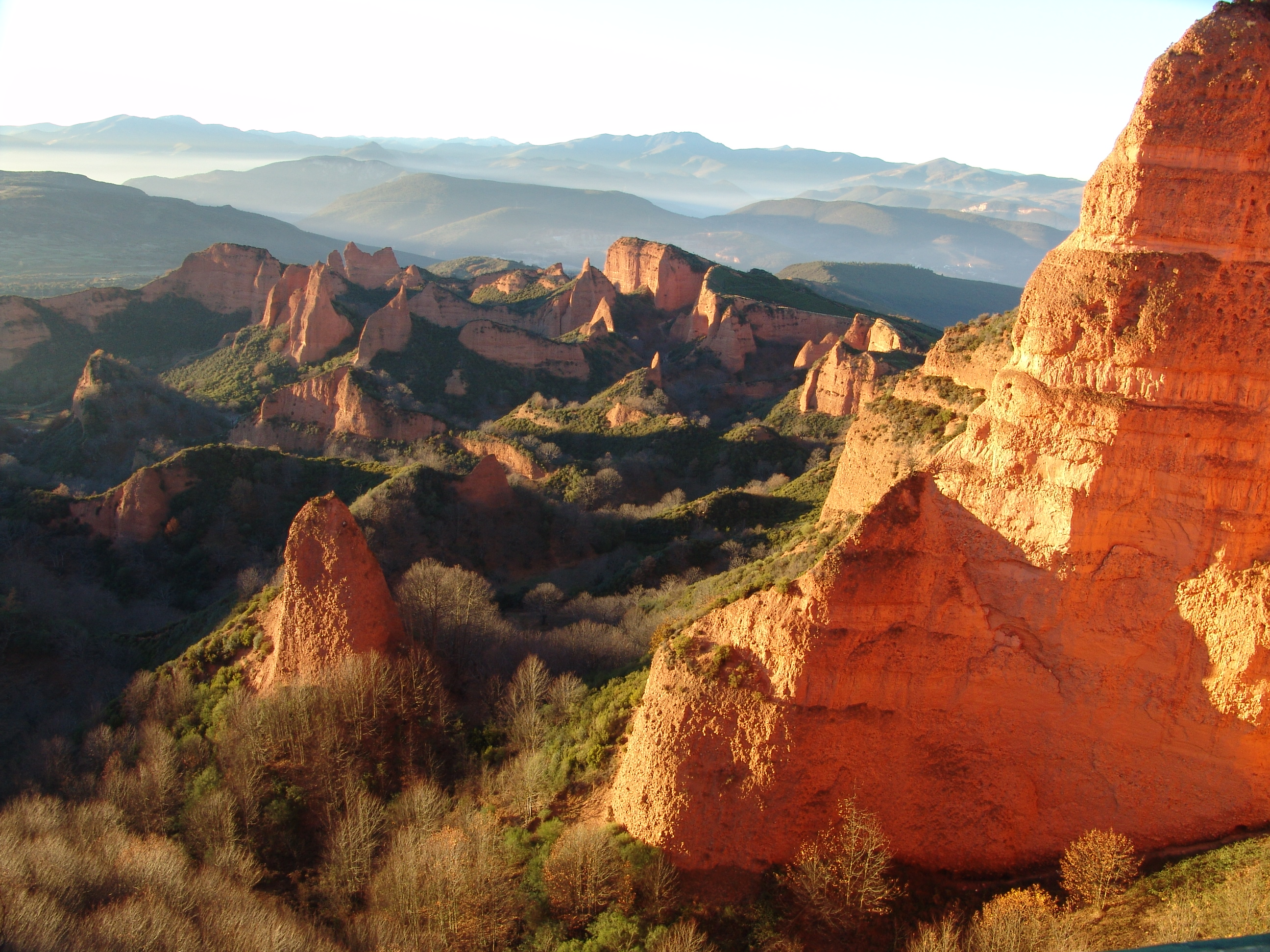
View of Las Médulas

In earlier times the process water was not generally recycled and the spent ore was not reclaimed. The remains of a Roman alluvial gold mine at Las Médulas, Spain are so spectacular as to justify the site being designated UNESCO World Heritage status. The methods used by the Roman miners are described by Pliny the Elder in his work Naturalis Historia published in about 77 AD. The author was a procurator in the region and so probably witnessed large-scale hydraulic mining of the placer deposits there. He also added that the local lake Carucedo had been heavily silted by the mining methods.

Environmental activists describe the hydraulic mining form of placer mining as environmentally destructive because of the large amounts of silt that it adds to previously clear running streams (also known as the "Dahlonega Method"). Most modern placer mines use settling ponds, if only to ensure that they have sufficient water to run their sluicing operations.

In California, from 1853 to 1884, "hydraulicking" of placers removed an enormous amount of material from the gold fields, material that was carried downstream and raised the level of portions of the Central Valley by some seven feet in affected areas and settled in long bars up to 20 feet thick in parts of San Francisco Bay. The process raised an opposition calling themselves the "Anti-Debris Association". In January 1884, the North Bloomfield Mining and Gravel Company case banned the flushing of debris into streams, and the hydraulic mining mania in California's gold country came to an end.

Despite environmental concerns, placer mining is still important in areas such as the Yukon, and it has considerable support, with local businesses often displaying signs to that effect.

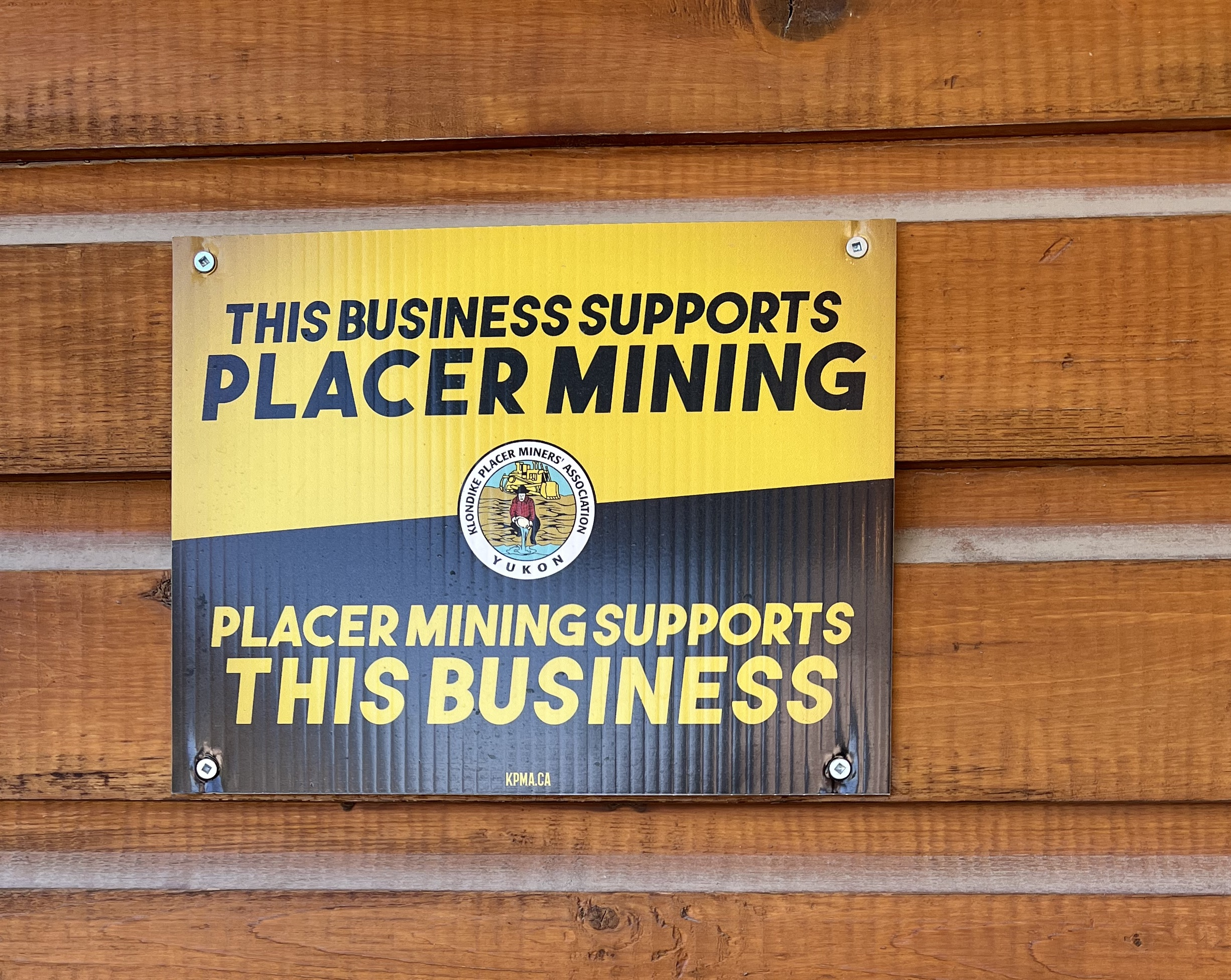
Sign supporting Placer Mining displayed in Dawson City, Yukon, July 2022

== Examples ==
- The Witwatersrand Basin in South Africa is an example of a placer deposit, as it is a three billion-year-old, alluvial sedimentary basin containing at least 70 ore minerals.
- The Fraser Canyon Gold Rush prompted in 1858 the incorporation of Colony of British Columbia (1858–1866).
- The Klondike Gold Rush began in 1896 when nuggets of gold were found in the Klondike region of Alaska and the Canadian Yukon Territory. The nuggets were found in running water, making the Klondike Gold deposit an alluvial placer mining deposit, which it soon became when 30,000 gold-seekers trekked to the region.
- The area around Valdez Creek has almost exclusively been placer mined since 1897.

== See also ==
- Gold in California
- Gold mining in Alaska
- British Columbia gold rushes
- Gold prospecting
- Quartz reef mining
