= Woodruff v. North Bloomfield Gravel Mining Company =

- Court: United States Court of Appeals for the Ninth Circuit
- Decided: January 7, 1884

Court membership
- Judge sitting: Lorenzo Sawyer

Keywords
- California, Gold Rush, Mining

The case of Woodruff v. North Bloomfield Gravel Mining Company was a lawsuit brought to California courts in 1882 where a group of local farmers sued North Bloomfield Mining and Gravel Company over damages caused to farmland in the Central Valley. The farmers who brought the suit claimed that the company's hydraulic mining operations (which were used to mine gold in the years following the California Gold Rush) resulted in the disposal of excess sediment, debris, and chemicals in local rivers. Prosecutors argued that the debris raised river beds and restricted flow in the rivers leading to heavy man-made flooding. In the years prior, flooding of debris and chemicals had destroyed a large portion of the valley's agriculture.

After two years of deliberation, the judge presiding over the case, Lorenzo Sawyer, ultimately ruled in favor of the farmers. Based on testimony and evidence reviewed, Sawyer decided that mining debris posed dangers to private land, particularly private lands in the agricultural sector. Ultimately, Sawyer's decision limited hydraulic mining operations in California and was considered to be the first major environmental law in California. The site of North Bloomfield Mining and Gravel Company's largest mine, Malakoff Diggins, is now a California State Historic Park located near Nevada City, California.

== California Gold Rush ==
=== Discovery of Gold ===
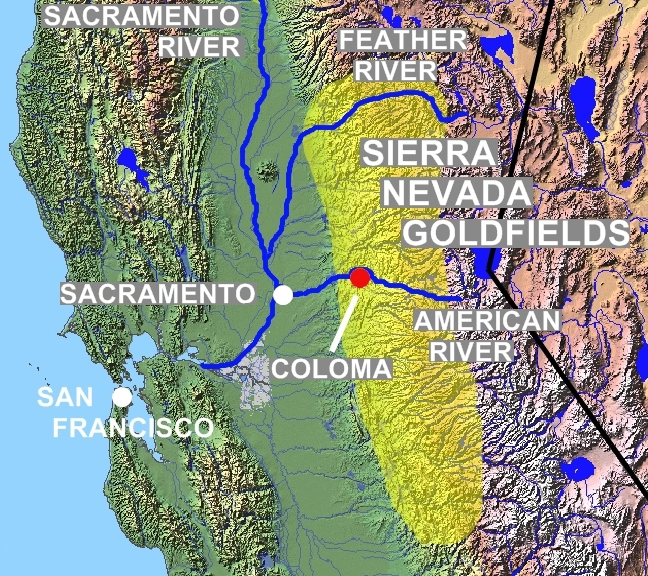
Map of Northern California. The region in gold, the Mother Lode, is where the majority of the gold was discovered. Note the locations of major rivers.

The first gold in California was discovered by James W. Marshall at Sutter's Mill in Coloma on January 24, 1848. Marshall, who worked for Captain John Sutter, the founder of Sutter's Fort, had been examining lumber equipment when he spotted shiny rocks in the American River near present-day Auburn. After finding several along the stretch of the river, he took a few samples and examined them determining that they were not rocks but minerals. After performing various tests, Marshall discovered that he had found gold. Despite attempts by Sutter to maintain secrecy, the news was soon carried by the mill workers west to San Francisco. After military officers toured the gold fields and confirmed the discovery, a report was issued to the United States Congress, ultimately leading President Polk to publicly declare the discovery to the nation. Soon, large flocks of immigrants from across the country flooded into California.

=== Mining Settlements and Techniques ===
Most of the mining settlements in California were established in the foothills of Northern California in close proximity to Sutter's Mill. Due to a high abundance of natural resources deposited by earlier geological activities, the western edge of the Sierra (particularly cities located in present-day Sierra, Nevada, Placer, Amador, and El Dorado counties) were heavily mined for gold and other minerals. Many mining towns stretched from Mariposa in the south to several smaller mining towns in the north near Chico along the region known as the Mother Lode (a reference to the large amount of gold found in the regions).

Initial gold mining techniques took place on a small scale and had relatively low impacts on the environment. Originally, panning for gold in the American River (using water in a shallow pan to sift through river gravel), was one of the most common methods. While simple, the process yielded relatively little profit because of the long, slow process. Other methods included using rockers and sluice boxes to sift through river gravel and sediment. These processes were faster than gold panning, but were still slow and proved problematic in finding smaller nuggets amongst the larger rock. Additionally, these early methods were forms of placer mining or mining that occurred near the surface. This proved to be problematic for miners trying to reach larger yields embedded within the Mother Lode and not pieces of gold simply on the surface.

== Hydraulic Mining ==
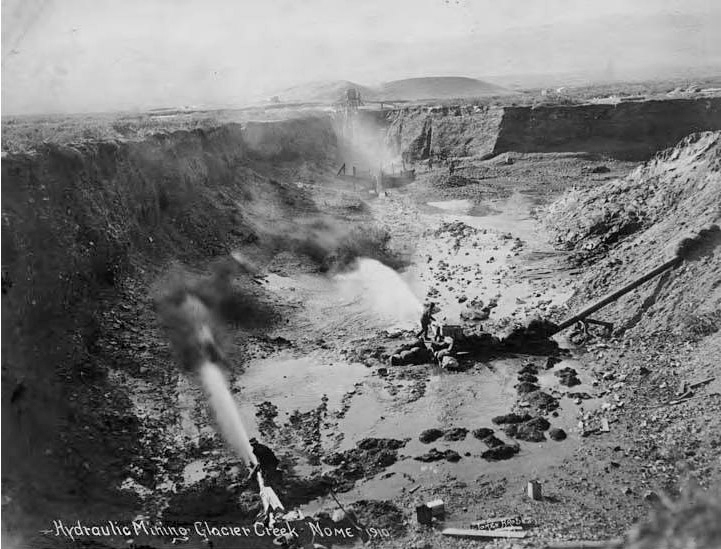
Miners using monitors to blast away hillsides in Alaska 1910. A similar process occurred in California.

=== Rise of Hydraulic Mining ===
As more miners flooded into the region, placer mining became less profitable and gold more scarce. Remaining pieces of gold were unattainable and embedded deep within the hillsides of the Mother Lode. As a result, many miners took an interest in new techniques and technologies that could be used to obtain the deeper gold fields. A new method used in Nevada City in 1853 was of particular interest; miner Edward Matteson had successfully used a high-pressure hose to wash away gravel and uncover gold. Excited by the prospect of obtaining higher yields of gold, miners scrambled together to attract wealthy investors and form companies.

Most hydraulic mining sites appeared across northern California's Mother Lode in the 1860s. These regions proved to be the most profitable in the search for gold and were also located near necessary water sources (water played a central role in the hydraulic mining process, hence the name hydraulic). During hydraulic mining, local rivers and streams were diverted into narrow channels that funneled the water into high pressured water cannons called monitors. The pipes were set up downhill, to increase momentum and pressure so water could be pumped out at high velocities to erode sediment from the hillside. The discharge of the monitors was so powerful they could move rocks the size of a car. The large amounts of rock, minerals, and soil from the hillsides were then directed into sluices where miners would sift through the sediment to remove valuable rocks or minerals. However, the process yield relatively little profit in comparison to the massive amounts of debris generated. This debris had to be deposited somewhere and, to ensure quick removal, was dumped into a series of tunnels downstream. As the debris flowed downstream, much of it became deposited within the riverbeds, restricting water flow.

The largest operation during this time was North Bloomfield Mining and Gravel Company's Malakoff Mine near Nevada City. French miner Julius Poquillion originally bought the 1,500 acres in 1866 through combining several abandoned land claims to buy the property for the company. After receiving help from several wealthy San Francisco investors, Poquillion founded North Bloomfield Mining and Gravel Company. Several others sites were also located along the Placer-Nevada County line near present-day Highway 80 and the towns of Colfax and Grass Valley.

=== Environmental Impacts ===
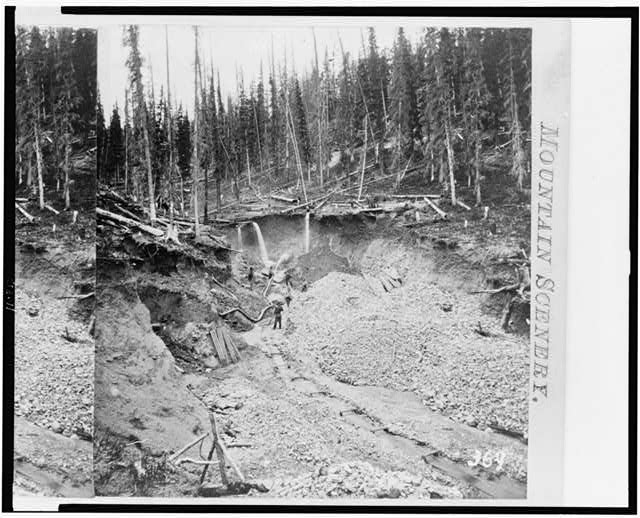
Former hydraulic mining pit in Northern California. Note the physical destruction of the landscape.

While hydraulic mining was extremely effective, it also altered local ecosystems and ecosystem services through impacting the region's bionic and abiotic components as well as the physical landscape.

Prior to mining, much of the land was stripped of trees either to be sold as timber to make way for mining or to use in the construction of the mine; other plants and trees at the site were destroyed or contaminated during the mining process. Consequently, local wildlife populations suffered from habitat loss or degradation. The damage forced some species out of the region and others to the brink of extinction. The California Grizzly was one of the species whose populations were nearly eradicated during this time period. Fish species, like salmon, were also severally impacted; excess debris and hazardous chemicals deposited into local rivers changed river pH, temperature, and limited access to the ocean and spawning habitats.

The mining debris did not only impact the immediate communities, however. Rivers in the Sierra initially began in remote locations as small streams. As they flowed downstream, however, collecting runoff, precipitation, and snowmelt within their drainage basin, they increased in volume, velocity, and discharge. Combining with other rivers (such as the Sacramento or Yuba) the rivers made their way into the valley. Yet, the discarded sediment from mining operation had previously been deposited downstream and blocked their flows, raising the river beds. This greatly increased the waterways chance of flooding. While the mountains in the Sierra Nevada had the advantage of higher elevations, sparse populations, and being upstream, the low-lying agricultural land in the valley proved to be extremely vulnerable due to the region's geography. As a result, cities in the valley were inundated with mud and debris that destroyed not only farmland but cites as well. Additionally, dams and other forms of infrastructure were limited in this era, providing little protection to farmers in a region that was already highly susceptible to flooding. As a result, the rising water levels destroyed agriculture, property, and killed several residents. The costs and monetary loss proved to be astronomical to the valley cities and the agricultural industry.

== Conflicting Viewpoints ==
=== Anti-Debris Association ===
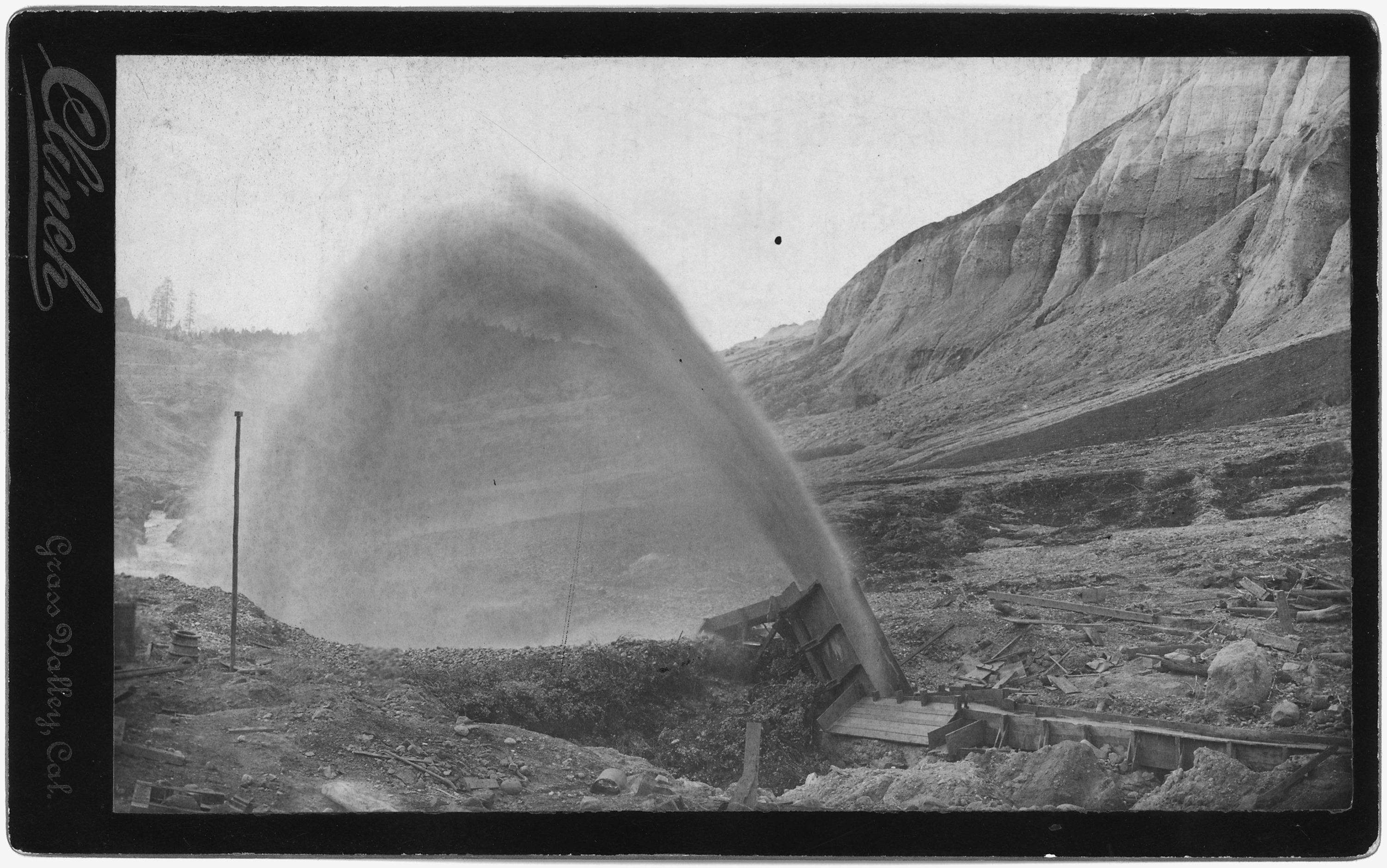
Operating Hydraulic Mining elevator and impounding works at North Bloomfield Mine

After a particularly devastating flood hit Marysville in 1875, a group of citizens from across the Central Valley formed the Anti-Debris Association in 1878. Initially, the main focus of the association was not to end hydraulic mining (although after years of no progress they would shift their focus), but to hold mining companies accountable for the mining debris generated. To support their argument, the farmers argued their private ownership rights were violated when the mining debris harmed their lands. The Sacramento Record Union (the newspaper owned by Southern Pacific Railway's Big Four) played an important role in helping to organize the association; the railway owners too feared the growing impact of mining and the impacts on their relationship with farmers. For the next few years, the farmers and their allies attempted to work together with state officials and the mining companies to reach a compromise through petitions. These attempts, however, proved unsuccessful, although the farmers were able to document what they deemed "environmental negligence" by the mining companies. The farmers also created the Anti-Debris Guard, a special unit of men in uniform meant to protect the valley. Additionally, the farmers rallied together to form a State Engineering office that could review dams and mining operations used by hydraulic mining operations.

=== Hydraulic Miners' Associations ===
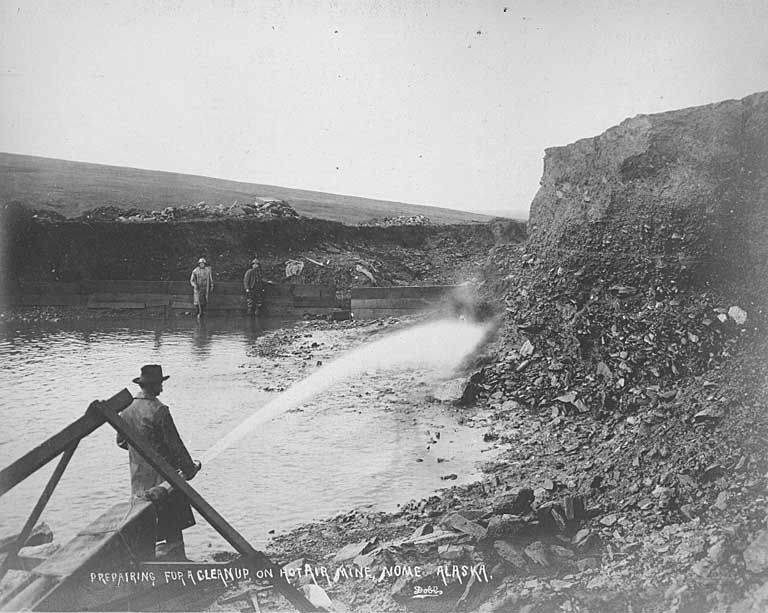
Hydraulic Mining Damages in Alaska

Similar to the Anti-Debris Association, the Hydraulic Miners' Association was formed to protect the interest of their mining industry; in 1876 they formed the association to challenge the interests of the Anti-Debris Association. The miners argued that because they legally owned the land they mined on, they could do whatever they wanted to the property. Additionally, they argued that urbanization as a whole caused the flooding, not specifically hydraulic mining. Flooding and environmental destruction, they argued was unavoidable if progress was to take place. At the time, the laws in place certainly favored the miners; laws limiting regulation in this time period were relatively unheard of. After heated debates with the Anti-Debris Association, it is speculated that the Hydraulic Miners' Association's breached a nearby levee, thus further damaging farmlands in Yuba County. No actual evidence, however, linked the miners to the breach and records from the association were not documented as thoroughly as the farmers in the Anti-Debris Association documented their association.

== Lawsuit ==
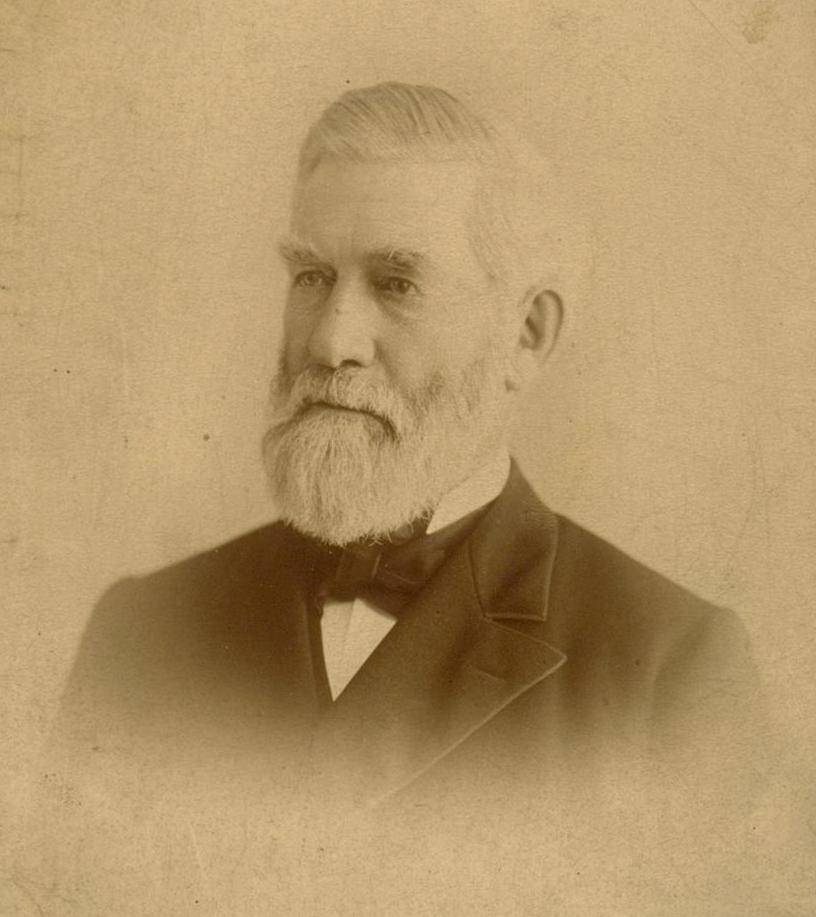
Judge Lorenzo Sawyer

After years of little success, wheat farmer Edward Woodruff filed a suit against North Bloomfield Mining and Gravel Company on behalf of the local farmers in the Central Valley Farmers; the case eventually became Woodruff v. North Bloomfield Gravel Mining Company.

Judge Lorenzo Sawyer, a Ninth Circuit Judge, and ironically, a former miner who came to California during the early gold rush, was assigned the case. He held a reputation for being a fair and thorough judge --- a reputation he upheld in taking two years to investigate the abuses claimed by farmers. During the case, Sawyer made multiple trips to the mining sites in question, conducting interviews with both farmers and the miners. He also surveyed the sites and the surrounding ecosystems to gain a better understanding of the full implications of mining.

In court, several witnesses testified against the mining company, including the Southern Pacific Railway Company who feared consequences from hydraulic mining would eventually negatively impact the railroad's infrastructure and influence. Mining had already restricted shipping and steamboat activity in the Sacramento Valley due to elevated river beds; the wealthy Southern Pacific voiced similar concerns. In court, photographs by John Todd were used by Woodruff's legal team to defend the rights of the farmers. Todd's photos showed the destruction caused by the mining and documented North Bloomfield's lack of precautions to limit flooding. Due to strong support for the farmers in the valley, few testified in the miner's defense other than the company. There is consequently very little written about the miner's efforts.

After two years, Sawyer made his final verdict public on January 7, 1884, his decision reaching 225 pages. Sawyer concluded that the mining operations not only were harmful to farmers, but also to state-funded infrastructure and California citizens. As a result, Sawyer ruled that mining companies could no longer dump debris in waterways. While this did not stop hydraulic mining or make it illegal, it did severely limit the impact the actions of the mining monopolies, at least on paper.

=== Aftermath ===
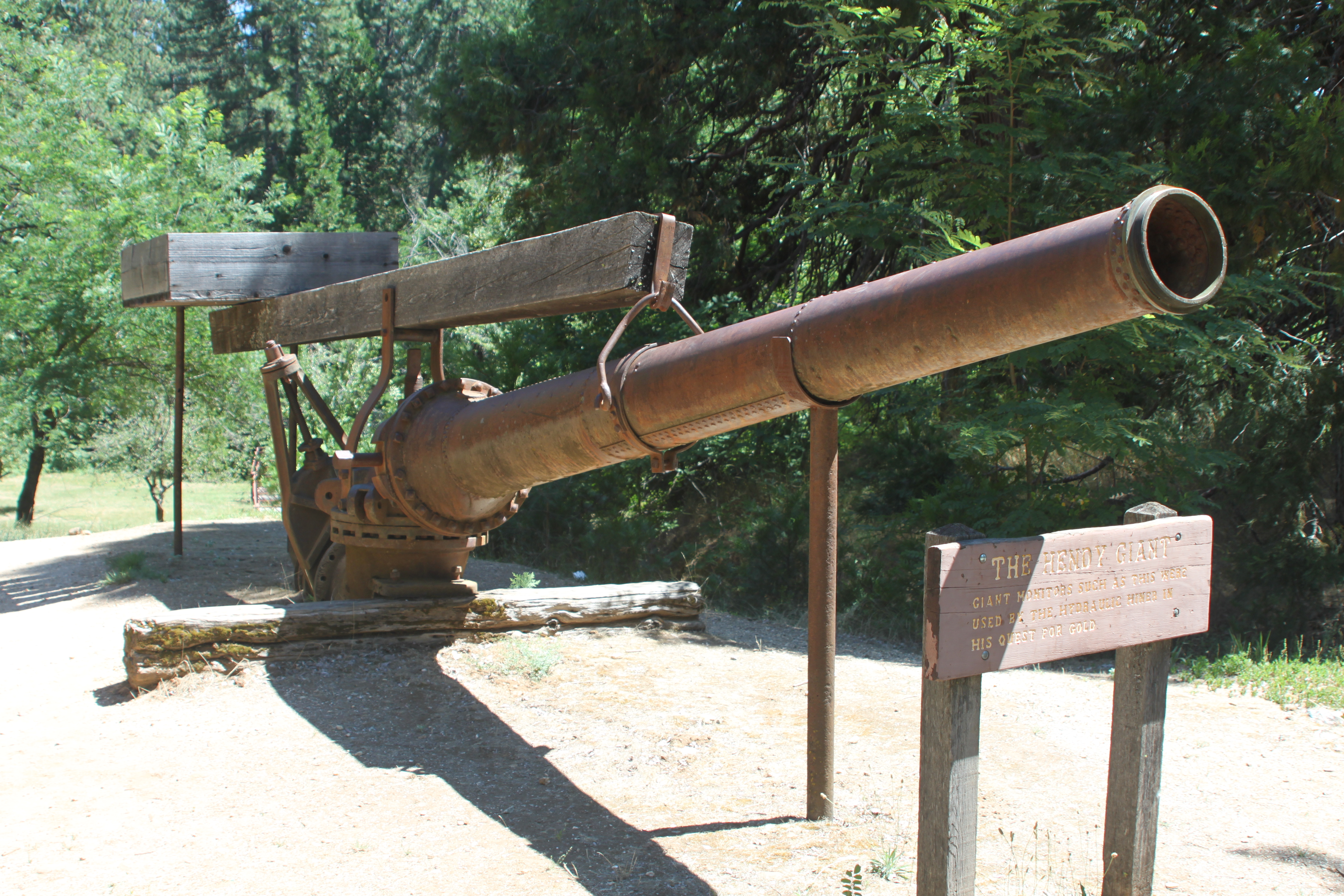
Hydraulic Mining Water Cannon at Malakoff Diggins State Park in California

Unsurprisingly, the farmers and the general public were extremely pleased with Sawyer's final decision; records show that church bells in Yuba County even rang out after the ruling. The miners, however, felt that their industry had been unfairly targeted and a limit had been placed on progress.

After the Sawyer Decision, the Anti-Debris Association continued to maintain an active role in enforcement and pushing for further legislation. North Bloomfield Mining and Gravel Company continued to mine at Malakoff Diggins after the Sawyer Decision, although to a much lesser extent. In 1886, the operations that continued were found to be in violation of the Sawyer Act; miners had been continuing to dump their waste into local waterways. As a result, the company had to pay hefty fines and was required to change its operations process, once again reducing their profit margin. Continuing Sawyer's legacy, the Caminetti Law, passed by Congress in 1893, further limiting mining and requiring that all hydraulic mining operations hold a license. North Bloomfield Mining and Gravel Company decided not to comply and was later fined. At this time, due to the heavy regulations and restrictions, many other smaller mining companies closed nearby and moved their businesses to Colorado, the Dakotas, and Alaska were few regulations existed. Malakoff Diggins remained one of the last hydraulic mining operations until it closed in 1910. It became a California State Historic Park in 1965.

== Legacy ==
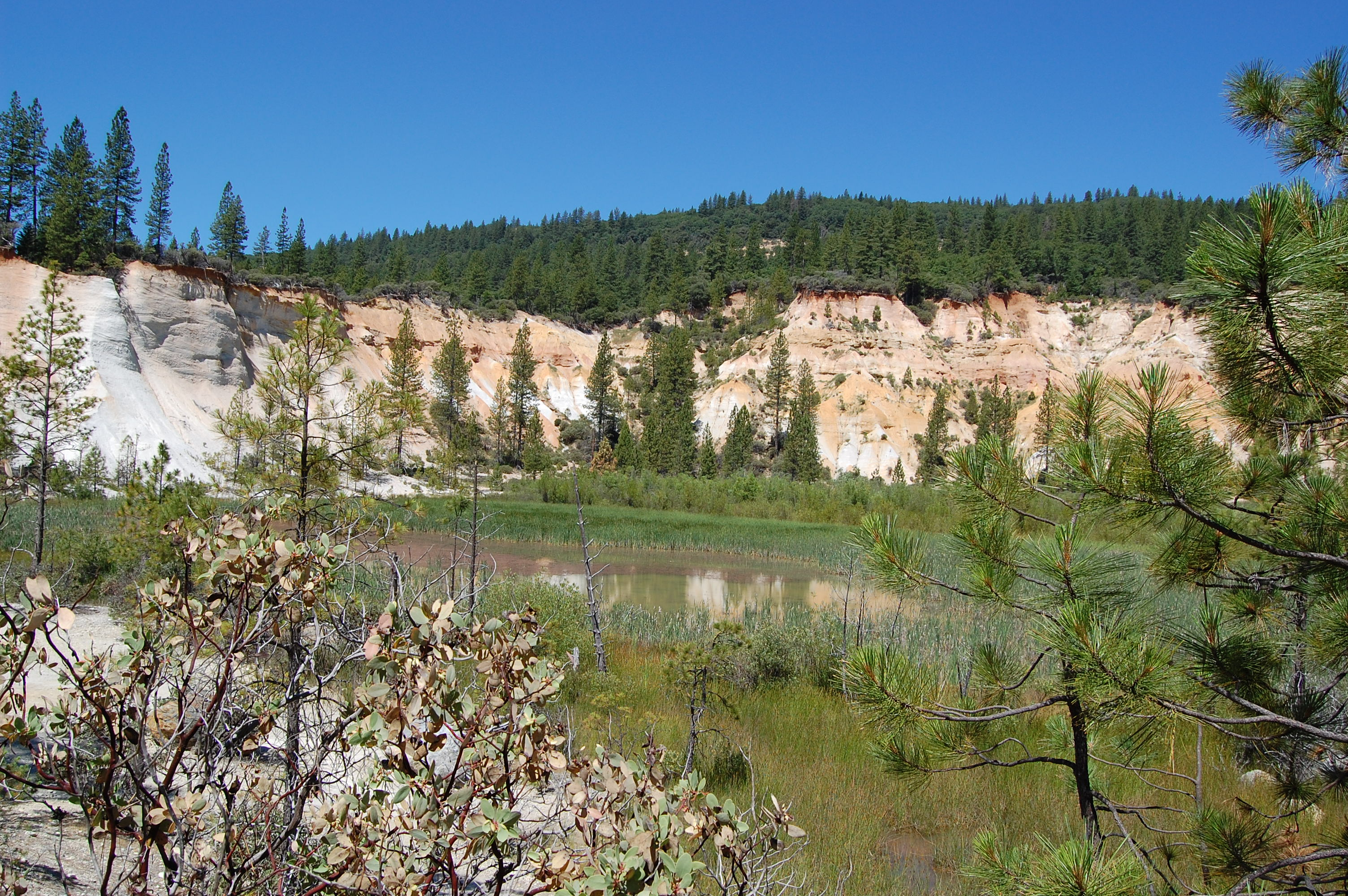
Cliffs exposed by Hydraulic Mining at Malakoff Diggins State Historic Park

While Sawyer's decision is widely considered to be California's first environmental law, the overall effectiveness of the act was questionable. Yet, it did place regulations on industry and set a precedent for years and laws to come. While the law is considered to be an important piece of environmental legislation, the success of the farmers resulted in California's changing status as an agricultural empire, particularly within the wheat industry. The lawless nature of the gold rush had lost its attractiveness and, in its place, California was creating a new, modern image based on wheat and other cash crops. A fertile valley, low elevations, sunny weather, moderate temperatures, and the confluence of local rivers for irrigation purposes all allowed the Central Valley to prosper as an agricultural center, promising more profit than the gold rush. Yet, the mining industry still stood in the way. Sawyer recognized the impact that the old industry could have on California's new economy, therefore, deciding that, in this case, governmental regulation was the best way to protect the rights of private ownership in agriculture from large-scale monopolies.
