= Borehole mining =

Mining technique

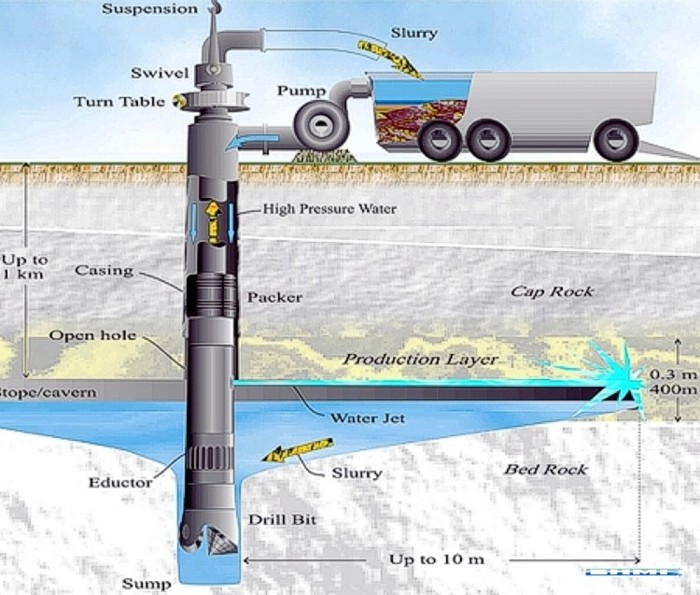
Borehole mining tool and technology principle schematic

Borehole Mining (BHM) is a remotely operated method of extraction (mining) of mineral resources through boreholes based on in-situ conversion of ores into a mobile form (slurry) using high-pressure water jetting (hydraulicking). This process is carried out from the land surface, open pit floor, underground mine or floating vessel through pre-drilled boreholes.

== History ==
Based on the US Patent database, the method history can be traced back to the beginning of the 20th century (1906). The most advanced BHM tool design was patented in 1926. With a few improvements, this design concept remains a base for the modern BHM tools and technologies. In the US, the major R&D were conducted by USBM in the 1970 and 1980s. Borehole mining of Uranium in Kazakhstan remains the most advanced BHM project in the world.

== The process ==
1. A borehole is drilled to a required depth;
2. A casing column is lowered down the hole. Since BHM takes place in an open hole, the casing shoe is located just above the upper boundary of the production interval (an orebody), leaving the rest open;
3. A BHM tool is lowered into the hole;
4. High-pressure water is pumped down, and the tool is rotated and moved up and down.

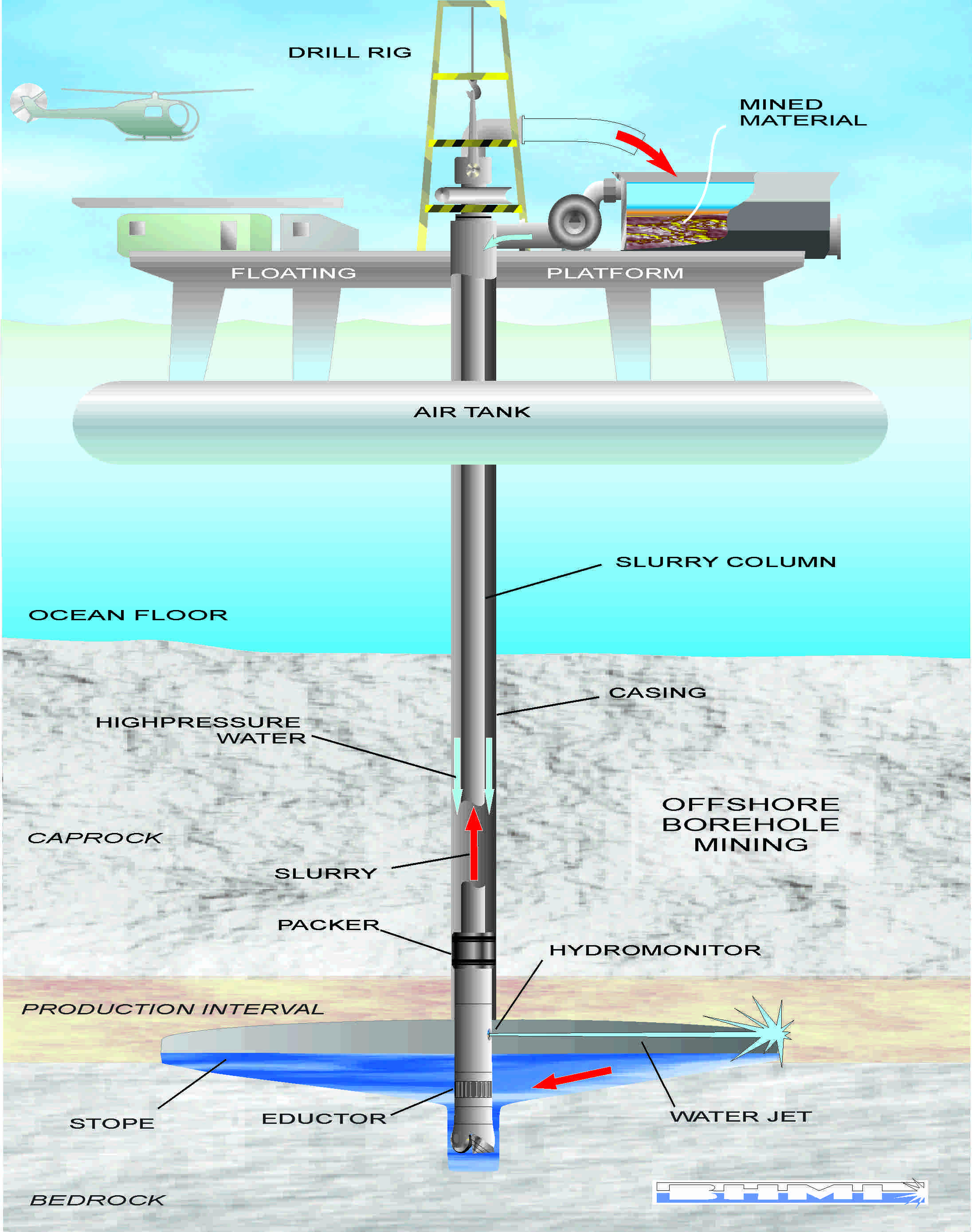
This is below-the-seafloor borehole mining. The major difference from onshore BHM is that the BHM tool is operated from the deck of a floating platform.

== Description of a BHM tool ==
The tool consists of at least two concentric pipes which are forming two hydraulic channels—one for pumping down a high-pressure working agent (water) and the second for delivering produced slurry back to the surface. A BHM tool typically consists of 3 major units: (1) a Bottom Head with an eductor (waterjet pump) and hydromonitor sections. (2) an extension section consisting of a set of standard pipes connecting the Bottom Head to the Upper Head; and (3) an Upper Head including swivel allowing the tool suspension and rotation in a borehole as well as its connection to the working agent source (pump station) and the slurry collector. An airlift is often used to assist the eductor to pump slurry from greater depths. A standard drill rig is normally used to operate a BHM tool.

The tool is lowered into a well until the hydromonitor reaches the required depth. Then the high-pressure water is pumped down. Approximately one-half of it leaves the tool through the hydromonitor and is expelled outside the tool in the form of a powerful waterjet. The jet cuts and loosens ore, producing a slurry which is pumped back to the surface by the Eductor. In a collecting pond or tank, the slurry is separated, and clarified water is recirculated. While extracting rocks and ores, different-shaped caverns can be created. Their shape depends on the BHM tool manipulation during mining, which involves rotating the tool, sliding it up and down, and a combination of these two actions. Borehole mining is applied from vertical, horizontal and deviated wells.

== Advantages of BHM ==
The main advantages of the method include its low capital and operating cost, mobility, selectivity, ability to work in hazardous and dangerous conditions, low environmental impact and several more. The method is used in mining of such natural resources and industrial materials as: uranium, iron ore, quartz sand, fine gravel, coal, poly-metallic ores, phosphate, gold, diamonds, manganese, rare earths, phosphate, amber and several more. Borehole mining is also used in exploration, oil, gas and water stimulation, underground storage construction, environmental applications and several other applications.

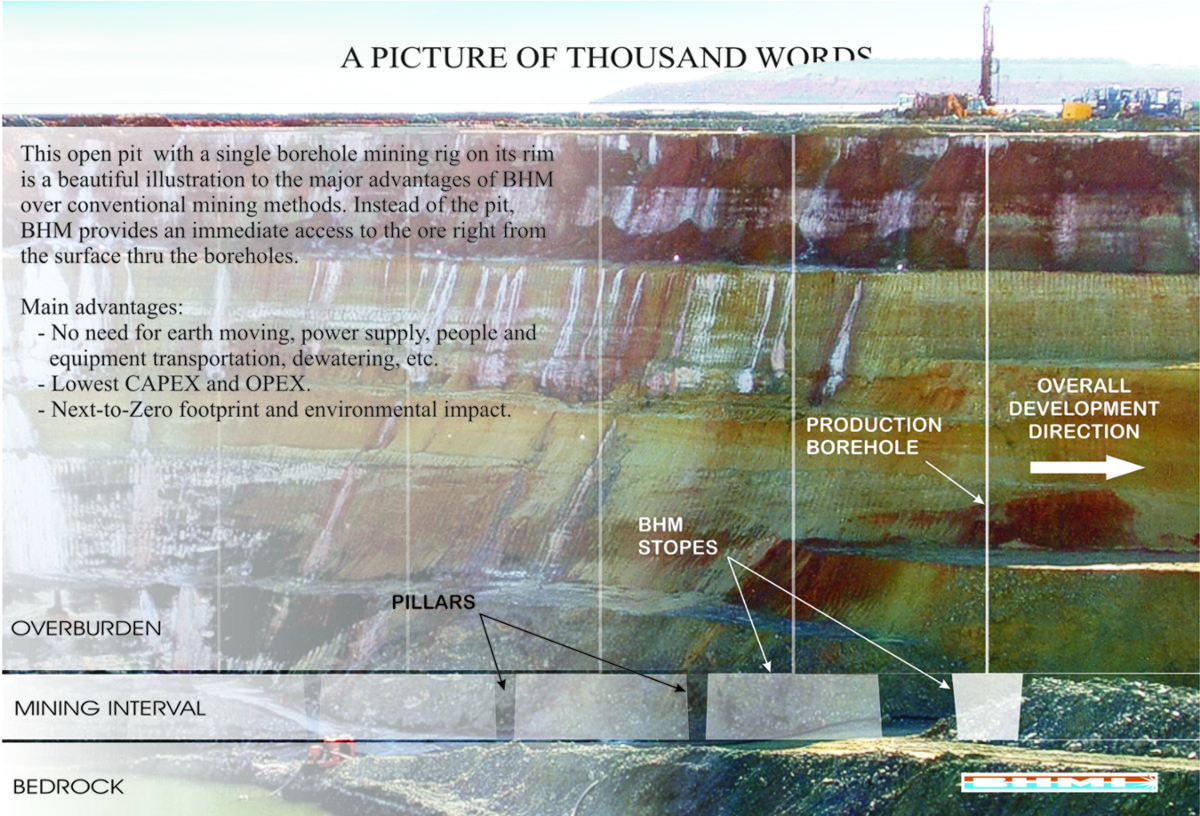
This borehole mining tool working at the edge of the open pit is a clear illustration of main advantages of BHM over conventional mining methods.
