= Malakoff Diggins State Historic Park =

State Historic Park

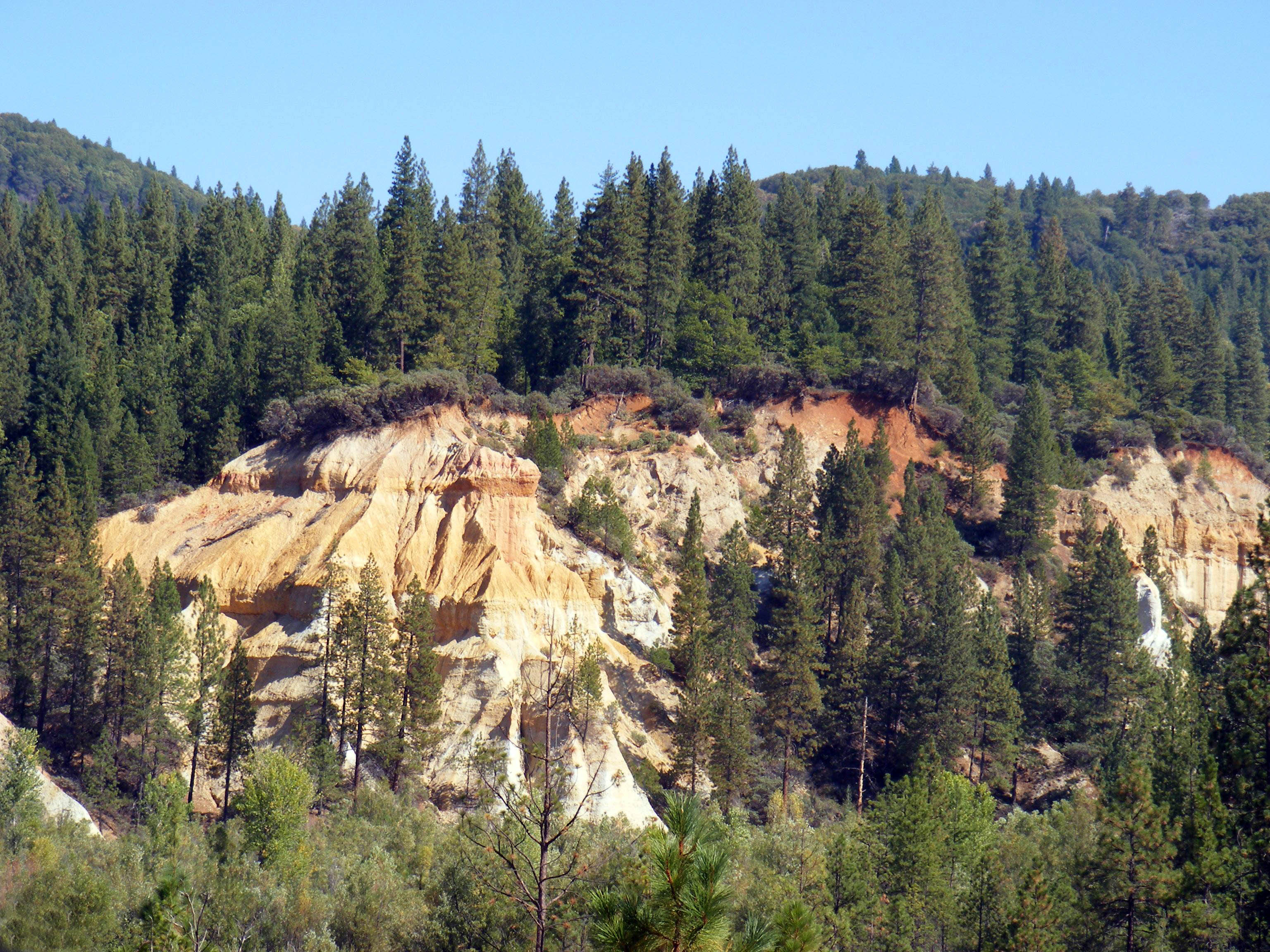
- Canyon wall created by hydraulic mining at Malakoff Diggins State Historic Park

- Location within California Location within the United States
- Location: Nevada County, California, United States
- Nearest city: Nevada City, California
- Coordinates: 39°21′46″N 120°55′28″W
- Area: 3,143 acres (12.72 km^{2})
- Established: 1965
- Governing body: California Department of Parks and Recreation
- Malakoff Diggins-North Bloomfield Historic District
- U.S. National Register of Historic Places
- U.S. Historic district
- Area: 865 acres (350 ha)
- Built: c. 1850–1899
- NRHP reference No.: 73000418
- Added to NRHP: April 11, 1973

Malakoff Diggins State Historic Park is a state park unit preserving Malakoff Diggins, the largest hydraulic mining site in California. The mine was one of several hydraulic mining sites at the center of the 1882 landmark case Woodruff v. North Bloomfield Mining and Gravel Company. The mine pit and several Gold Rush-era buildings are listed on the National Register of Historic Places as the Malakoff Diggins-North Bloomfield Historic District. The "canyon" is 7,000 feet (2,100 m) long, as much as 3,000 feet (910 m) wide, and nearly 600 feet (180 m) deep in places. Visitors can see huge cliffs carved by mighty streams of water, results of the mining technique of washing away entire mountains of gravel to wash out the gold. The park is 26 miles (42 km) north-east of Nevada City, California, in the Gold Rush country. The 3,143-acre (1,272 ha) park was established in 1965.

== History ==
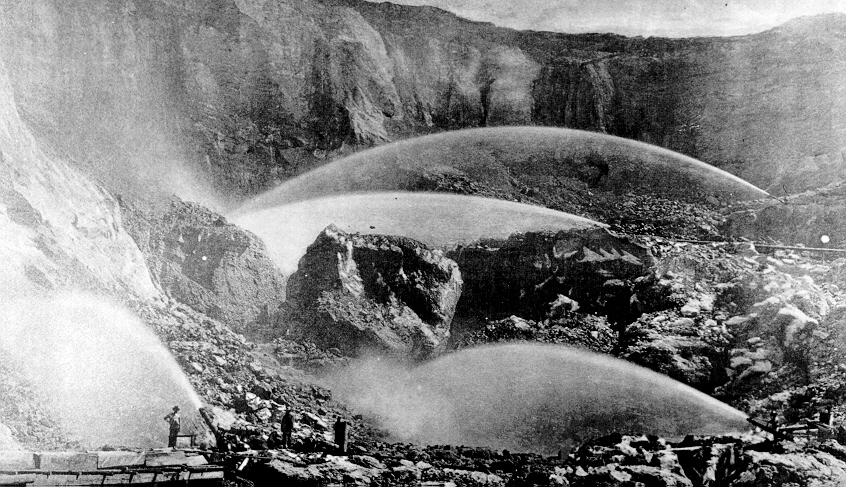
Hydraulic mining underway in North Bloomfield in 1890

The Malakoff mine pit on the San Juan Ridge is the impetus for one of the nation's first environmental protection measures.

In 1850 there was little gold left in streams. Miners began to discover gold in old riverbeds and on mountainsides high above the streams. In 1851 three miners headed northeast of what is now Nevada City for a less crowded area to prospect. One miner went back to town with a pocket full of gold nuggets for supplies and was followed back by many prospectors. These followers, however, did not find any gold and declared the area "Humbug", thus the stream was so named "Humbug Creek". Around 1852, settlers began to arrive in the area and the town of "Humbug" sprang up. These miners could not decide how to move the dirt to a place where there was water.

By 1853 miners invented a new method of mining called hydraulic mining. Dams were built high in the mountains. The water traveled from the reservoirs through a wooden canal called a flume that was up to 45 miles (72 km) long. The water ran swiftly to the canvas hoses and nozzles called monitors waiting in the old riverbeds. The miners would aim the monitors at the hillsides to wash the gravel into huge sluices. Over time the monitors became bigger and more powerful. Their force was so great they could toss a fifty-pound rock like a cannonball or even kill a person. Over 300 Chinese worked on this project and two Chinese settlements existed in North Bloomfield.

By 1857 the town had grown to 500 residents. Locals felt the name "Humbug" was too undignified and renamed the town "Bloomfield", but California already had a town by this name so they renamed the town "North Bloomfield".

In the late 1860s the towns of Marysville and Yuba City were buried under 25 feet (7.6 m) of mud and rock, and Sacramento flooded repeatedly. The farmers in the valleys complained about the tailings that flooded their land and ruined their crops. Thousands of acres of rich farmland and property were destroyed as a result of hydraulic mining.

By 1876 the mine was in full operation with 7 giant water cannons working around the clock. The town had grown to a population of around 2000 with various business and daily stage service. In 1880 electric lights were installed in the mine and the world's first long-distance telephone line was developed to service the mine, passing through North Bloomfield as it made its way from French Corral to Bowman Lake.

By 1883 San Francisco Bay was estimated to be filling with silt at a rate of one foot per year. Debris, silt, and millions of gallons of water used daily by the mine caused extensive flooding, prompting Sacramento valley farmers to file the lawsuit Woodruff v. North Bloomfield Mining and Gravel Company. On January 7, 1884, Judge Lorenzo Sawyer declared a permanent injunction against dumping mining debris in the rivers.

== Climate ==
At an altitude of 3,248 feet (990 m), Malakoff Diggins generally has warm, dry summers and cold, wet winters. Weather can change rapidly any time of the year. Rain and snow fall usually from October until April, though there may be thunderstorm activity in the summer as well.

== North Bloomfield ==
The visitor center has exhibits depicting life in the old mining town of North Bloomfield, with a past population of 1,500 that served as a supply base for the Diggins. About a block of buildings, some dating to the 1850s, are restored or re-created in a Gold Rush style, including white picket fences. One of the buildings is used as park headquarters and there is a museum with old artifacts, and a model showing how hydraulics worked. In summer, park rangers lead tours through a general store, a furnished home, and a drugstore whose shelves are lined with bottles, boxes and vials of medicines. A church, schoolhouse and other buildings are also part of the tour. One of the restored structures is St. Columcille’s Catholic Church. Originally built in Birchville in 1865 as an armory, later converted to a church, dismantled in 1971 and re‑erected at Malakoff Diggins State Historic Park.

Park facilities include hiking trails, picnic area, swimming and fishing, a campground and rustic cabins that can be rented by campers.

Humbug Days, including a parade and barbecue, is an annual event.

== Hiking and trails ==
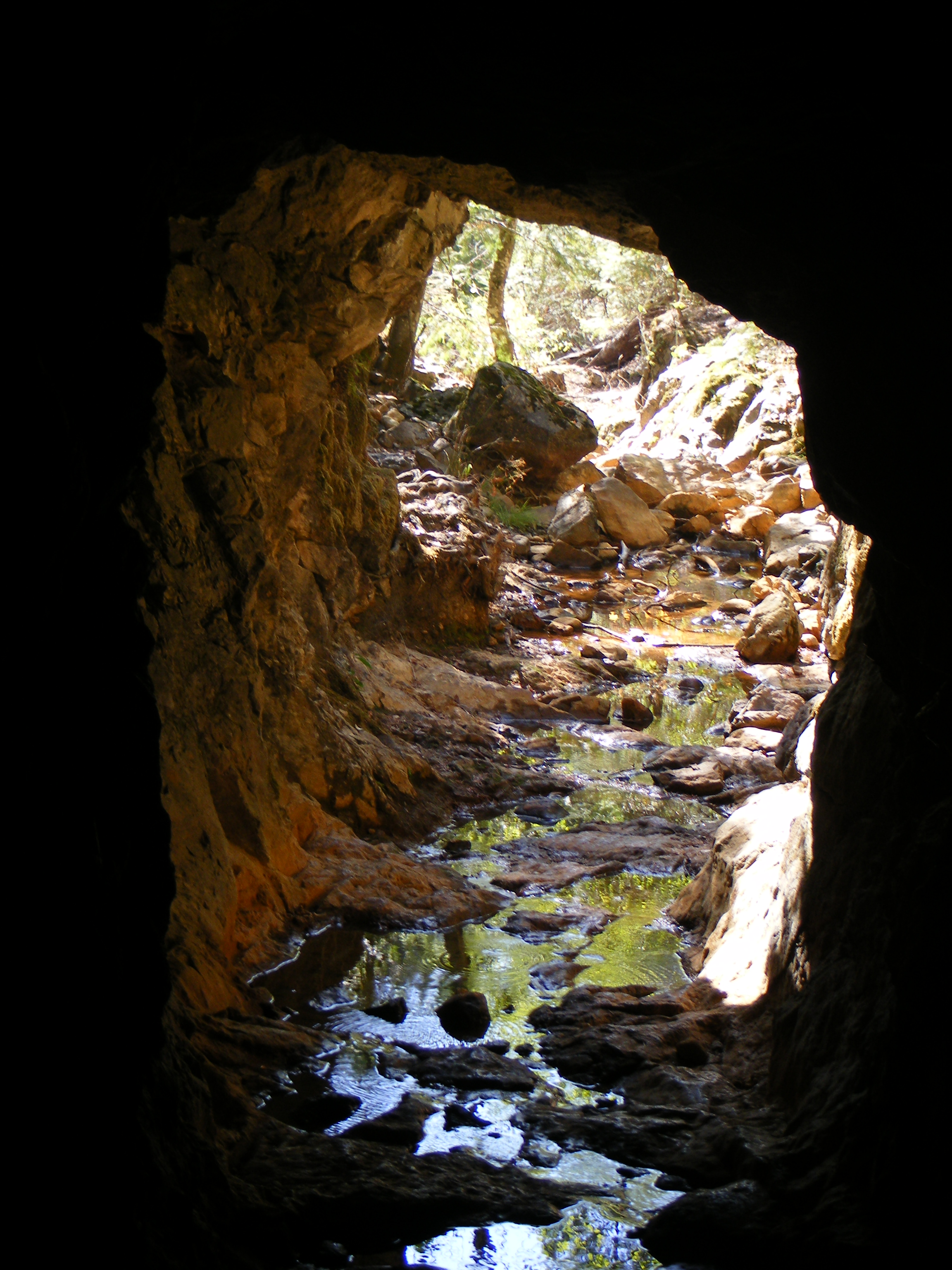
Looking out the Hiller Tunnel near Malakoff Diggins

Visitors to the state historic park can hike on miles of trails. The mining pit is unfenced and accessible from the road and pathways that surround it. Hikers can enter the 556-foot-long (169 m) Hiller Tunnel, through which water for the mining operation once flowed. The park also contains a 7,847-foot (2,392 m) bedrock tunnel that served as a drain. Other hiking includes:

- Rim Trail
- Diggins Loop Trail
- Blair Trail
- North Bloomfield Trail

== Proposed for closure ==
Malakoff Diggins was one of 70 California state parks proposed for closure by July 2012 as part of a deficit reduction program. It was previously one of many state parks threatened with closure in 2008. Those closures were ultimately avoided by cutting hours and maintenance system-wide.

== See also ==
- List of California state parks
