= Hydraulic mining =

Mining technique using high-pressure water jets to carve away minerals

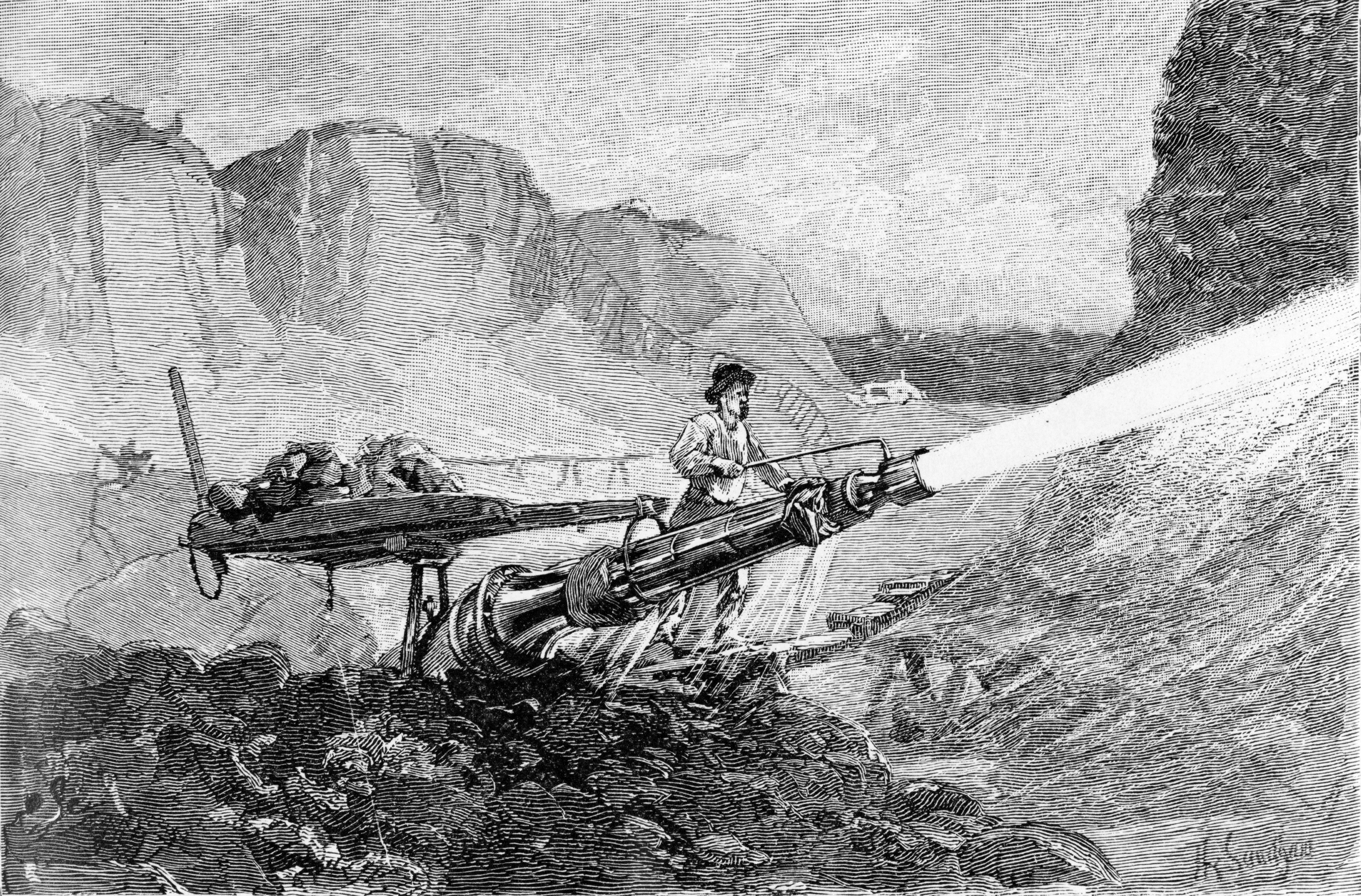
A miner using a hydraulic jet to mine for gold in California, from The Century Magazine January 1883

Hydraulic mining is a form of mining that uses high-pressure jets of water to dislodge rock material or move sediment. In the placer mining of gold or tin, the resulting water-sediment slurry is directed through sluice boxes to remove the gold or tin. It is also used in mining kaolin and coal.

Hydraulic mining developed from ancient Roman techniques that used water to excavate soft underground deposits. Its modern form, using pressurized water jets produced by a nozzle called a "monitor", came about in the 1850s during the California Gold Rush in the United States. Though successful in extracting gold-rich minerals, the widespread use of the process resulted in extensive environmental damage, such as increased flooding and erosion, and sediment blocking waterways and covering farm fields. These problems led to its legal regulation. Hydraulic mining has been used in various forms around the world.

== History ==
=== Ground sluicing ===
Hydraulic mining had its precursor in the practice of ground sluicing, a development of which is also known as "hushing", in which surface streams of water were diverted so as to erode gold-bearing gravels. This technique was developed in the first centuries BC and AD by Roman miners to erode away alluvium. The Romans used ground sluicing to remove overburden and the gold-bearing debris in Las Médulas of Spain, and Dolaucothi in Great Britain. Later archaeological work in the North Pennines of northern England identifies hushing as a hydraulic mining technique used in post-medieval lead-mining landscapes, with evidence that it was widespread there during the 18th century.

Water was used on a large scale by Roman engineers in the first centuries BC and AD when the Roman Empire was expanding rapidly in Europe. Using a process later known as hushing, the Romans stored a large volume of water in a reservoir immediately above the area to be mined; the water was then quickly released. The resulting wave of water removed overburden and exposed bedrock. Gold veins in the bedrock were then worked using a number of techniques, and water power was used again to remove debris. The remains at Las Médulas and in surrounding areas show badland scenery on a gigantic scale owing to hydraulicking of the rich alluvial gold deposits.

Las Médulas is now a UNESCO World Heritage Site. The site shows the remains of at least seven large aqueducts of up to 30 miles (48 km) in length feeding large supplies of water into the site. The gold-mining operations were described in vivid terms by Pliny the Elder in his Natural History published in the first century AD. Pliny was a procurator in Hispania Terraconensis in the 70s AD and witnessed the operations himself. At Dolaucothi in South Wales, archaeological survey of the Roman gold mine's surface remains documented a complex aqueduct system above the main workings; the site is identified by the National Trust as the only known Roman gold mine in Great Britain.

=== California Gold Rush ===
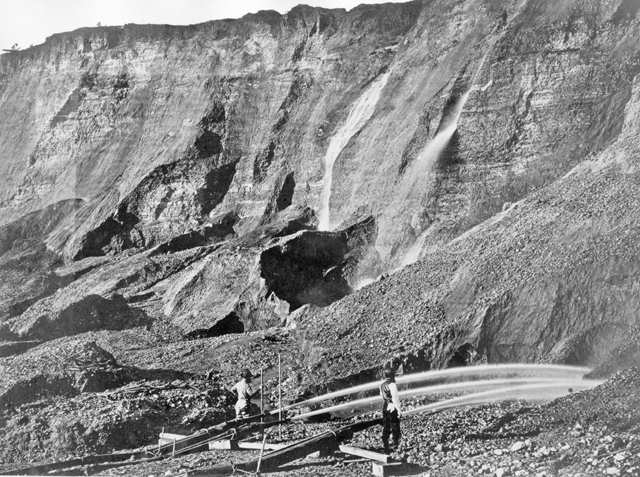
Gold miners excavate an eroded bluff with jets of water at a placer mine in Dutch Flat, California sometime between 1857 and 1870.

The modern form of hydraulic mining, using jets of water directed under very high pressure through hoses and nozzles at gold-bearing upland paleogravels, was first used by Edward Matteson near Nevada City, California in 1853 during the California Gold Rush. Matteson used canvas hose which was later replaced with crinoline hose by the 1860s. In California, hydraulic mining often brought water from higher locations for long distances to holding ponds several hundred feet above the area to be mined. California hydraulic mining exploited gravel deposits, making it a form of placer mining.

Early placer miners in California discovered that the more gravel they could process, the more gold they were likely to find. Instead of working with pans, sluice boxes, long toms, and rockers, miners collaborated to find ways to process larger quantities of gravel more rapidly. Hydraulic mining became the largest-scale, and most devastating, form of placer mining. Water was redirected into an ever-narrowing channel, through a large canvas hose, and out through a giant iron nozzle, called a "monitor". The extremely high pressure stream was used to wash entire hillsides through enormous sluices.

By the early 1860s, while hydraulic mining was at its height, small-scale placer mining had largely exhausted the rich surface placers, and the mining industry turned to hard rock (called quartz mining in California) or hydraulic mining, which required larger organizations and much more capital. By the mid-1880s, it is estimated that 11 million ounces of gold (worth approximately US$7.5 billion at mid-2006 prices) had been recovered by hydraulic mining .

==== Environmental impacts ====
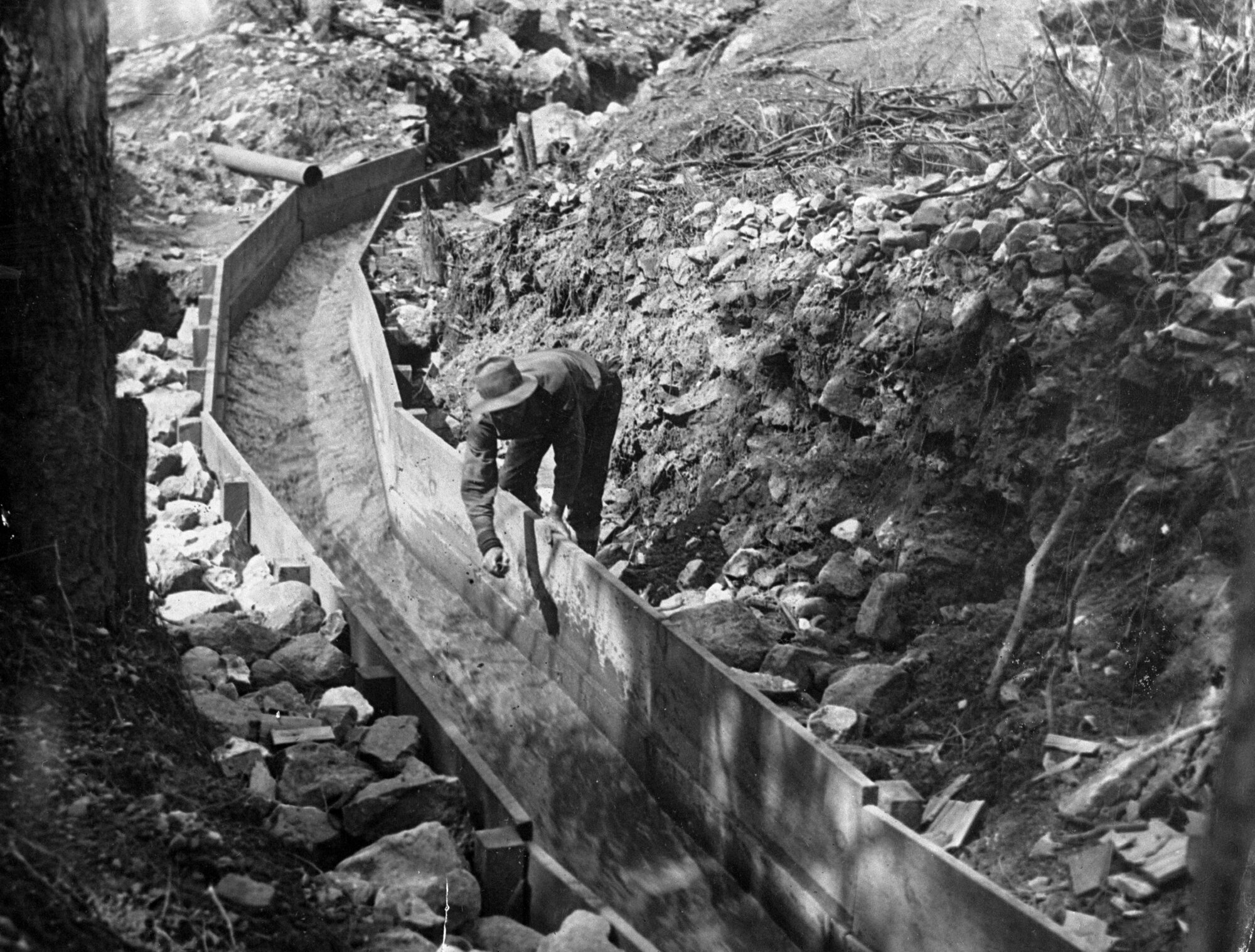
A man leans over a wooden sluice. Rocks line the outside of the wood boards that create the sluice.

While generating millions of dollars in tax revenues for the state and supporting a large population of miners in the mountains, hydraulic mining had a devastating effect on riparian natural environment and agricultural systems in California. Millions of tons of earth and water were delivered to mountain streams that fed rivers flowing into the Sacramento Valley. Once the rivers reached the relatively flat valley, the water slowed, the rivers widened, and the sediment was deposited in the floodplains and river beds causing them to rise, shift to new channels, and overflow their banks, causing major flooding, especially during the spring melt.

Cities and towns in the Sacramento Valley experienced an increasing number of devastating floods, while the rising riverbeds made navigation on the rivers increasingly difficult. Perhaps no other city experienced the boon and the bane of gold mining as much as Marysville. Situated at the confluence of the Yuba and Feather rivers, Marysville was the final "jumping off" point for miners heading to the northern foothills to seek their fortune. Steamboats from San Francisco, carrying miners and supplies, navigated up the Sacramento River, then the Feather River to Marysville where they would unload their passengers and cargo.

Marysville eventually constructed a complex levee system to protect the city from floods and sediment. Hydraulic mining greatly exacerbated the problem of flooding in Marysville and shoaled the waters of the Feather River so severely that few steamboats could navigate from Sacramento to the Marysville docks. The sediment left by such efforts were reprocessed by mining dredges at the Yuba Goldfields, located near Marysville.

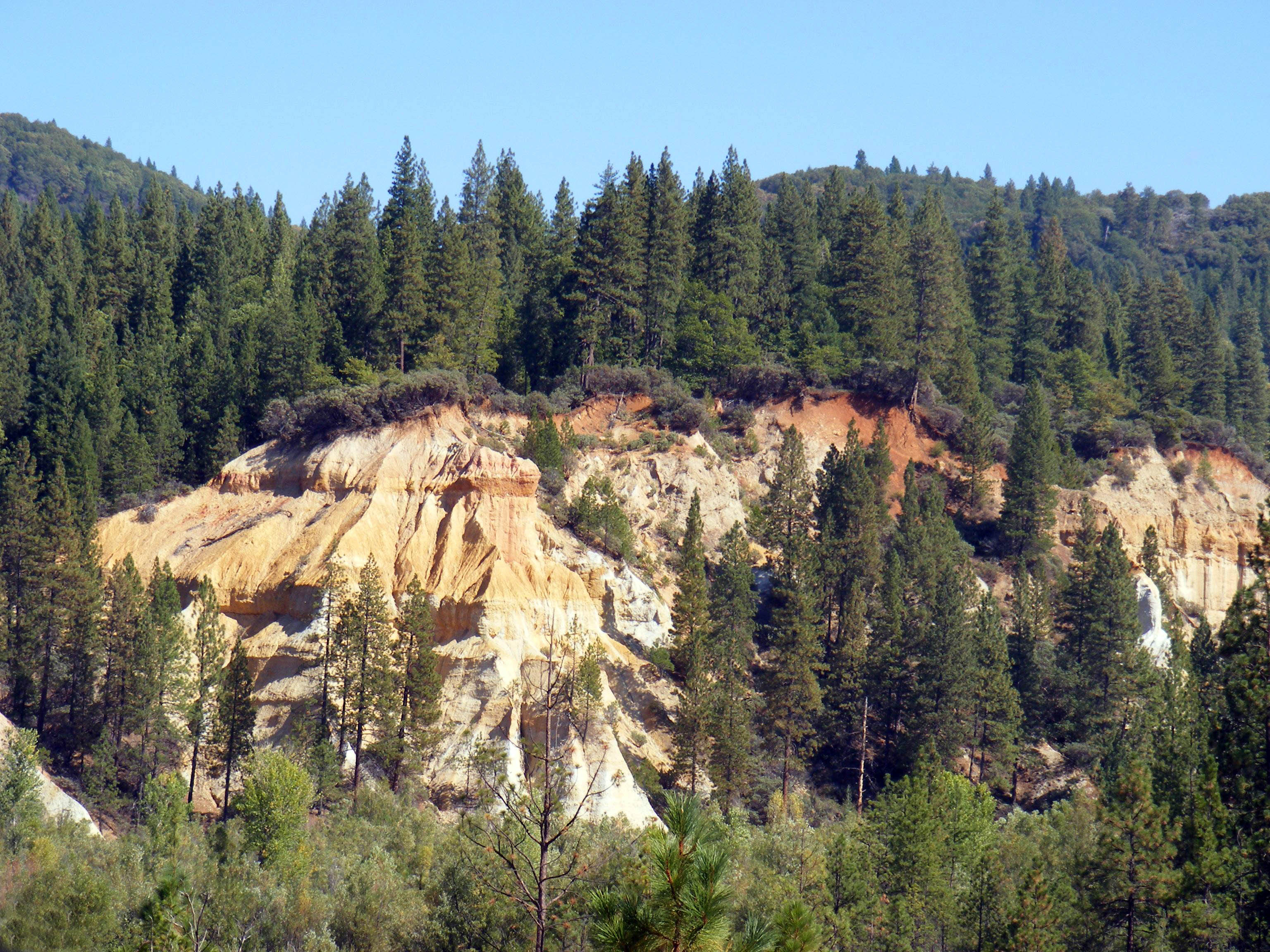
The Malakoff Diggins, California, showing the effects of hydraulic mining on a hillside over a century later. Much of the effects of the mining was beyond the hills themselves, on the areas downstream of the water and sediment flow they produced.

The spectacular eroded landscape left at the site of hydraulic mining can be viewed at Malakoff Diggins State Historic Park in Nevada County, California.

The San Francisco Bay became an outlet for polluting byproducts during the Gold Rush. Hydraulic mining left a trail of toxic waste, called "slickens," that flowed from mine sites in the Sierras through the Sacramento River and into the San Francisco Bay. The slickens would contain harmful metals such as mercury. During this period, the industrial mining industry released 1.5 billion yards of toxic slickens into the Sacramento River. As the slickens traveled through California's water arteries, it deposited its toxins into local ecosystems and waterways.

Nearby farmland became contaminated, which led to political pushback against the use of hydraulic mining. The slickens flowed through the Sacramento River before depositing itself into the San Francisco Bay. Currently, the San Francisco Bay remains dangerously contaminated with mercury. Estimates suggest that it will be another century before the Bay naturally removes the mercury from its system.

==== Legal action landmark case ====
Vast areas of farmland in the Sacramento Valley were deeply buried by the mining sediment. Frequently devastated by flood waters, farmers demanded an end to hydraulic mining. In the most renowned legal fight of farmers against miners, the farmers sued the hydraulic mining operations and the landmark case of Woodruff v. North Bloomfield Mining and Gravel Company made its way to the United States District Court in San Francisco where Judge Lorenzo Sawyer decided in favor of the farmers and limited hydraulic mining on January 7, 1884, declaring that hydraulic mining was "a public and private nuisance" and enjoining its operation in areas tributary to navigable streams and rivers.

Hydraulic mining on a much smaller scale was recommenced after 1893 when the United States Congress passed the Camminetti Act which allowed licensed mining operations if sediment retention structures were constructed. This led to a number of operations above sediment catching brush dams and log crib dams. Most of the water-delivery hydraulic mining infrastructure had been destroyed by an 1891 flood, so this later stage of mining was carried on at a much smaller scale in California.

=== Beyond California ===
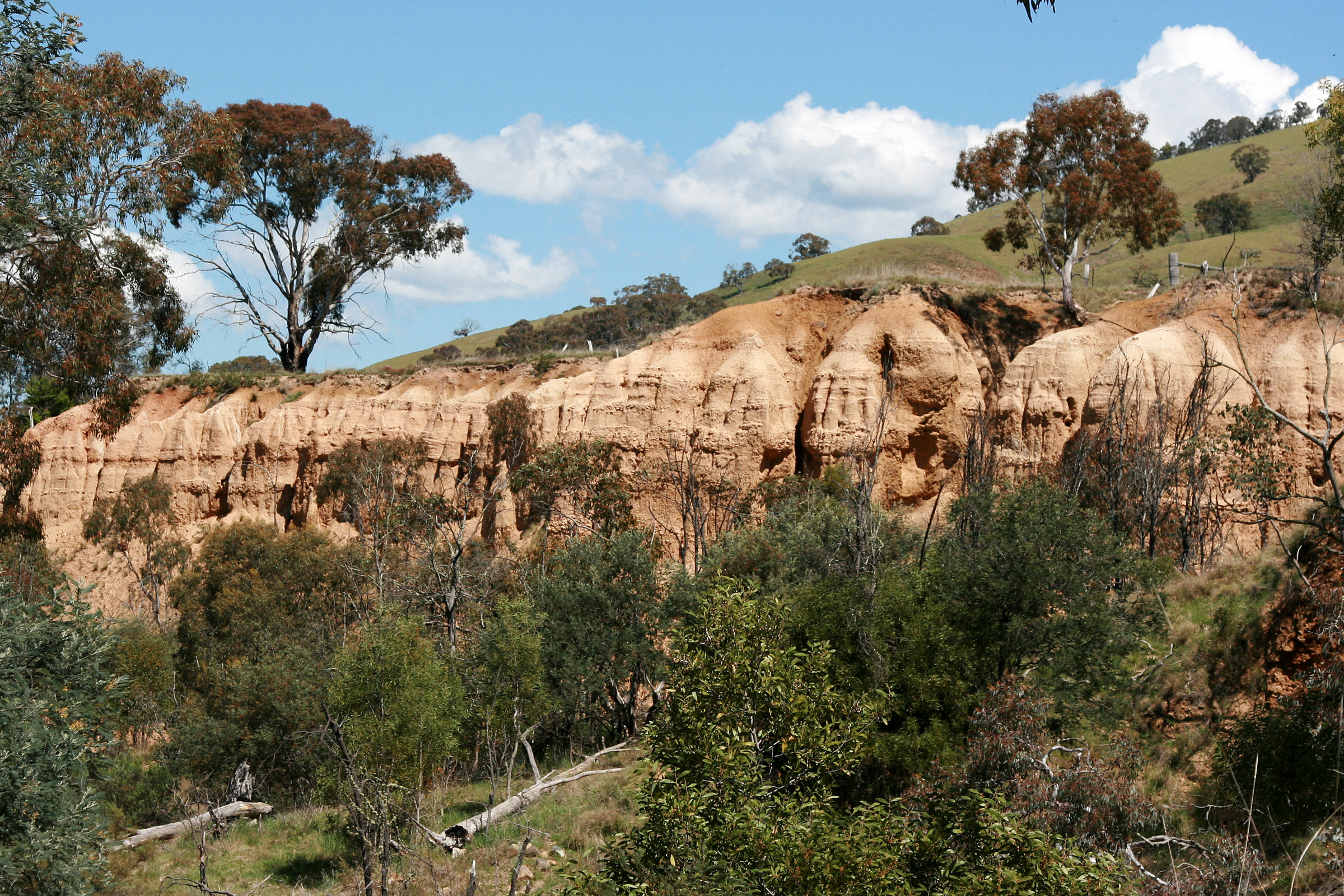
The Oriental Claims near Omeo, Australia were mined between the 1850s and 1900s. Hydraulic sluicing left man-made cliffs up to 30 metres (100 ft) high throughout the area.

Although often associated with California due to its adoption and widespread use there, the technology was exported widely, to Oregon (Jacksonville in 1856), Colorado (Clear Creek, Central City and Breckenridge in 1860), Montana (Bannack in 1865), Arizona (Lynx Creek in 1868), Idaho (Idaho City in 1863), South Dakota (Deadwood in 1876), Alaska (Fairbanks in 1920), British Columbia (Canada), and overseas. It was used extensively in Dahlonega, Georgia and continues to be used in developing nations, often with devastating environmental consequences. The devastation caused by this method of mining caused Edwin Carter, the "Log Cabin Naturalist", to switch from mining to collecting wildlife specimens from 1875–1900 in Breckenridge, Colorado, US.

Hydraulic mining was used during the Australian gold rushes where it was called hydraulic sluicing. One notable location was at the Oriental Claims near Omeo in Victoria where it was used between the 1850s and early 1900s, with abundant evidence of the damage still being visible today.

Hydraulic mining was used extensively in the Central Otago gold rush that took place in the 1860s in the South Island of New Zealand, where it was also known as sluicing.

Starting in the 1870s, hydraulic mining became a mainstay of alluvial tin mining on the Malay Peninsula. Hydraulicking was formerly used in Polk County, Florida to mine phosphate rock.

== Contemporary usage ==
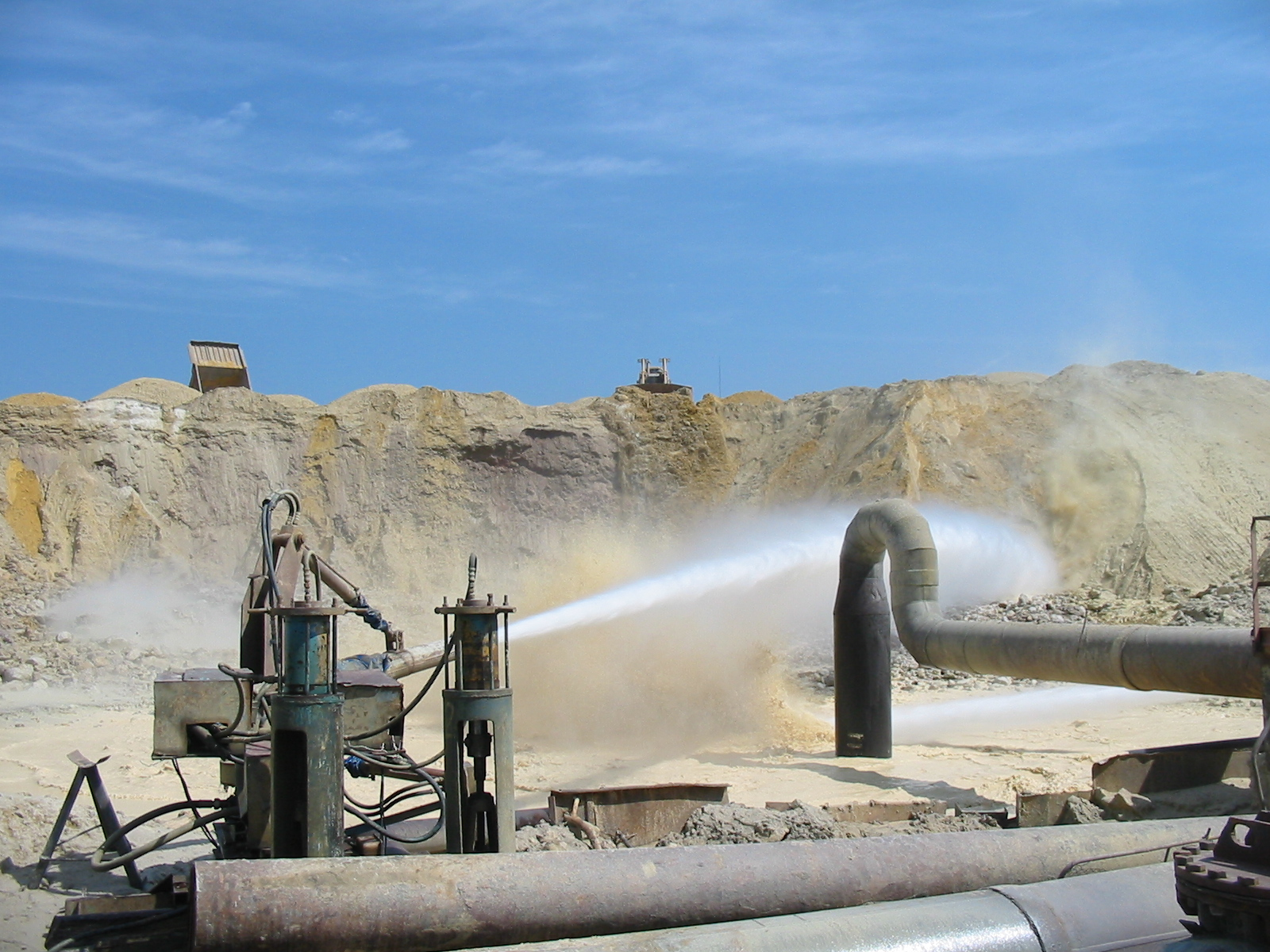
Modern hydraulic mining monitor in use.

In addition to its use in true mining, hydraulic mining can be used as an excavation technique, principally to demolish hills. For example, the Denny Regrade in Seattle was largely accomplished by hydraulic mining.

Hydraulic mining is the principal way that kaolinite clay is mined in Cornwall and Devon, in South-West England.

Egypt used hydraulic mining methods to breach the Bar Lev Line sand wall at the Suez Canal, in Operation Badr (1973) which opened the Yom Kippur War.

=== Rand gold fields ===
On the South African Rand gold fields, a gold surface tailings re-treatment facility called East Rand Gold and Uranium Company (ERGO) has been in operation since 1977. The facility uses hydraulic monitors to create slurry from older (and consequently richer) tailings sites and pumps it long distances to a concentration plant.

The facility processes nearly two million tons of tailings each month at a processing cost of below US$3.00/t (2013). Gold is recovered at a rate of only 0.20 g/t, but the low yield is compensated for by the extremely low cost of processing, with no risky or expensive mining or milling required for recovery.

The resulting slimes are pumped further away from the built-up areas permitting the economic development of land close to commercially valuable areas and previously covered by the tailings. The historic yellow-coloured mine dumps around Johannesburg are now almost a rarity, seen only in older photographs.

Uranium and pyrite (for sulfuric acid production) are also available for recovery from the process stream as co-products under suitable economic conditions.

== Underground hydraulic mining ==
High-pressure water jets have also been used in the underground mining of coal, to break up the coal seam and wash the resulting coal slurry toward a collection point. The high-pressure water nozzle is referred to as the 'hydro monitor'.

== See also ==
- Hydrology
- Hydropower
- Hydraulic fracturing, use of high-pressure water in oil and gas drilling
- Pressure washer, similar use of high-pressure jets of water
- Water jet cutter, similar use of high-pressure jets of water
- Cigar Lake Mine uses a similar method of high-pressure water to mine uranium
- Borehole mining, remotely operated with similar use of high-pressure water jets.
