= Champion-Providence Mine =

Gold mines in Nevada City, California, US

Coordinates: 39.2622222222°N 121.037222222°W

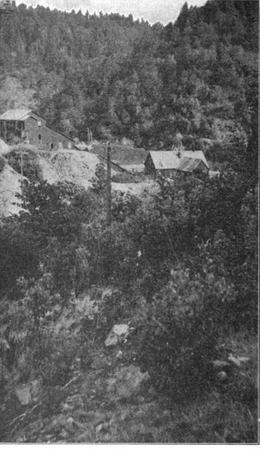
Mill and cyanide plant of the Champion-Providence Group

Champion-Providence Mine was a consolidation of two adjoining gold mines in Nevada City, California, subsequent to the California Gold Rush. After it became the Champion Group following annexation of additional adjacent mining concerns, it became one of the two most productive mining groups in the Nevada City Mining District, alongside the North Star Mine, which purchased it in 1911. The Champion-Providence Mine closed in 1920.

== Champion Mine ==
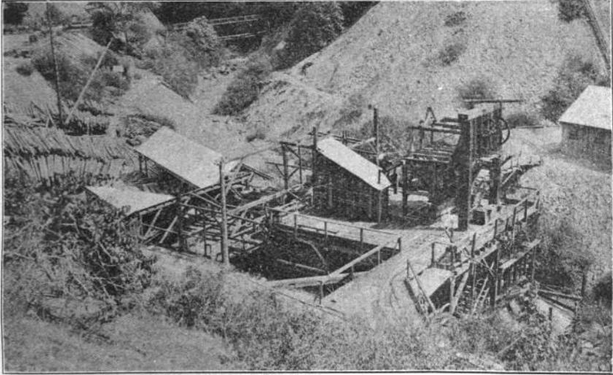
Headframe and plant at the Champion shaft.

=== Early years ===
The Champion mine is situated on Deer Creek, one mile west of Nevada City, at an altitude of 2,330 feet (710 m). The property had an original area of 27 acres (11 ha).

The Champion property, located in 1851 as the New Years, was not opened as early as the adjoining Providence mine and in 1888 the inclined shaft had reached a depth of only 300' (180’ vertical) and only 350’ of drifts had been driven. In 1892 a consolidation with the adjoining Merrified and 8 other claims had been effected and the development work consisted of a 3000’ drain tunnel driven from Wolf Creek on the vein and intersecting the shaft at a depth of 600'; an inclined shaft on the vein 1000’ in depth and the ten levels had reached a maximum length of 1000’ north of the shaft. Although compelled to suspend operations at intervals during the period from 1892 to 1902, owing to the Providence-Champion legal war, the Champion shaft had been sunk to a depth of 2400’ on the vein and a new shaft on the Merrifield vein had reached a depth of 900 feet.

=== Holdings ===
The course of the vein is north and south, dipping easterly with an inclination of 42 degrees. The vein is a large one, varying from 1–6 feet (0.30–1.83 m) in width and averaging from 2.5–3 feet (0.76–0.91 m). The fissure is a contact between a syenite in the hanging wall and a slate in the foot. This is probably due to the size of the vein and its permanence in depth. The property of the company consisted of a consolidation of ten claims, as follows: Merrifield, Climax, New Years, New Years Extension, Miiller, Phillips, Ural Relocation, Bavaria, Merrifield Extension, and Mary Ann. Two parallel veins were included in the property, the more eastern being the Merrifield, and the western, or foot wall vein, the New Years. The Champion Mine holdings included the Merrifield and Ural, together with the Wyoming and other minor veins, comprising one of the most important vein systems of the Nevada City District.

The Merrifield vein which varies in strike from N. to N. 20° W. and had an average dip of 35° E., was one of the longest and most persistent veins in the Nevada City district. It could be traced from a point 3000’ south of the Providence shaft to the Mount Auburn mine, a total distance of 11,000 feet. South of the Providence shaft, the Merrifield vein at the surface occurred near and at the contact of the slates and granodiorite. North of the Providence shaft, the vein occurred wholly in the granodiorite. The fissures were the result of intense dynamic stresses which resulted in a movement of the granodiorite hanging wall upward a distance of 1200 ft. As a result of the intense movement, there was generally a zone of crushed and altered material reaching a maximum width of 30 ft. The Merrifield quartz veins occurring in this altered zone varied in width from one to ten feet; of the wider veins, from four to six feet was solid quartz. In some cases, the ore bodies occurred along parallel planes separated by a few feet of altered country rock, while in others they are lenticular in form. The ore was a milky white quartz carrying an average of 6% of sulphides, consisting of pyrite, chalcopyrite, galena and sphalerite. ‘Specimen ore’ rarely occurs.

The Ural vein, which lies parallel and 500' west of the Merrifield, follows the contact of the granodiorite and contact metamorphosed Calaveras formation. It can be traced from the Champion shaft, N. 15° W. for a distance of 3500’, to within a short distance of the ‘New’ Nevada City shaft. At this point the vein takes a sharp bend to the westward (N. 70° W.) following the contact and can be traced to the Coan mine a distance of 4000’, making a total length of 7500 ft. From the point mentioned, a branch vein continues northward for a distance of 1000’ into the granodiorite, but appears to die out before intersecting the northern extension of the Merrifield vein. The Ural vein has an average dip of 35° E. and was worked in crosscuts from the 600', 1200’ and 1800’ levels. On the 600' level a drift was driven south from the crosscut on the Merrifield vein. This drift shows that 400’ south of the crosscut the vein enters an altered diabase and then splits, the east branch continuing south and then east in the diabase, while the west branch taking first a westerly and then a southerly course, finally enters an unaltered black slate. In the Providence mine the main ore body lies north of the point where the vein enters the diabase and was about 150’ in length with an average width of from 24; to 3 feet. The vein carries a black gouge on the foot-wall and several feet of altered granodiorite on the hanging wall. The sulphides are pyrite, chalcopyrite, galena and zinc blende amounting to from 5 to 8 per cent, and an occurrence of telluride of silver and lead is reported. The physical and mineralogical characteristics of the Ural vein, as shown by the Champion workings, are similar to those in the Providence ground. The Wyoming vein, which lies in the footwall of the Ural vein, dips to the east and joins the latter in depth. It seems probable that this vein in its northern extension is the one that intersects the Ural vein in the vicinity of the ‘Old’ Nevada City shaft. The northern continuation of the Ural vein in the Nevada City (Gold Hill) property was extensively worked since 1879, and in 1914 most of the ore being produced was coming from this source. The vein averages about 2' in width, reaching at times a maximum of 12 feet. As in the case of the Ural vein in the Champion-Providence territory the lode in the Nevada City ground shows the characteristic evidence of intense movement and alteration. The sulphides, however, average only 2% per cent.

=== Operations ===
The mine was worked through an incline shaft 900 feet (270 m) in length, with an inclination of about 42 degrees. Eight levels were turned from the shaft with a maximum extent north of 528 feet (161 m), and south 180 feet (55 m). A drain tunnel extending north from the shaft 3,000 feet (910 m) into the hill relieved the mine of the surface water.

Two shoots of ore were worked, one on the north and the other on the south of the shaft. That on the south was of high grade, while the north shoot was large, but contained low-grade ore. As depth was attained the north shoot pitched south more rapidly; crossing the shaft between the 6OO-foot and 900-foot levels. As the north, or low-grade shoot, approached the south shoot, an improvement in the grade of the former was noticeable, increasing as the shoots approached each other without any decrease in the grade and size of the rich shoot. The ore from the mine was of good grade, while the cost of mining was very small, varying from US$2.50 to $3 per ton. The ore was free milling, but at times very heavily mineralized. Ore of this character and quality ran from $150 to $200 per ton. Notwithstanding this heavy mineralization, the ore throughout yielded from 4 per cent to 5 per cent of sulphurets, with a total average value of $80 per ton, about $10 per ton being silver. The product was treated in the chlorination works belonging to the company.

The water from the mine was light, the largest pump being an .66 feet (0.20 m) plunger pump, which sufficed to keep clear of water the workings below the tunnel level. Ventilation was afforded by a regular system of winzes from level to level.

The ore was crushed in a fifteen-stamp mill. The weight of stamps was seven hundred and fifty pounds, dropping seven inches 90 times per minute, and crushing through No. 5 round-punched screens. The duty per stamp was one and two-thirds tons per day. No rockbreakers or self-feeders were used, but the introduction of the same was contemplated. Steel shoes and iron dies were used. The sulphurets were saved on six Frue concentrators. The chlorination plant owned by the mine was formerly the property of the Merrifield Company. It contained one roasting furnace 75 by 10 feet (22.9 m × 3.0 m) inside measurement. It had a capacity of four tons per day; when sufficient sulphurets had accumulated, a run is made. The sulphurets of the Mountaineer Mine was usually treated in these works. The cost of treatment was $8 per ton. The mine was provided with water power throughout; three Pelton wheels were used: a 5 feet (1.5 m) for plunger, and an 8 feet (2.4 m) for hoisting. Power for the mill was obtained from a 5 feet (1.5 m) wheel. Altogether a total of 75 inches of power water was used under a head of 120 feet (37 m) feet.

In 1893, five men are employed in the chlorination works. Fifty-six men and boys were employed underground, plus three in the mill. Miners' wages underground were $3 per day.

== Providence Mine ==
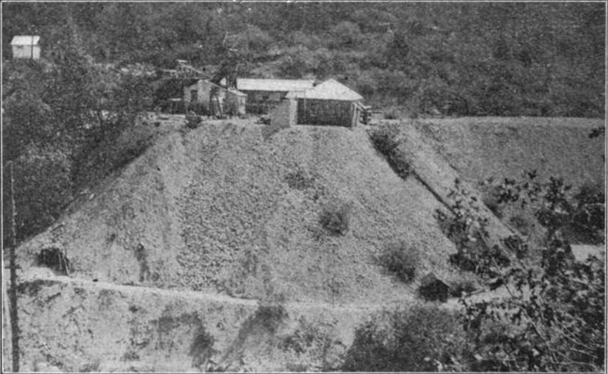
Providence Mine, surface plant and waste dump. This shaft is on the south bank of Deer Creek, just opposite the Champion.

=== Early years ===
The Providence Mine was situated on the south bank of Deer Creek, 1 mile (1.6 km) west of Nevada City, at an altitude of 2,340 feet (710 m).

The Providence Mine, located in 1858 as one of the earliest claims of the group, was first operated from 1861 to 1867. Owing to difficulties encountered in treating the concentrates the mine was not worked successfully until after the adoption of the chlorination process about 1870. In 1886 the shaft had reached a depth of 1100' and eleven drifts, the longest of which was 3600', had been driven on the Merrifield vein. A crosscut 547’ in length had also been run westward to the Ural vein from the 600’ level of the Providence shaft. After being worked at intervals by the owners and tributers the mine was closed in 1891, but was again reopened the following year. In 1894 apex litigation was instituted between the Providence and Champion and this was finally settled in 1902 by the purchase of the Providence property by the Champion company. The Providence had been developed to a. depth: of 1750’, and was credited with a production of $5,000,000 prior to its acquisition by the Champion.

=== Operations ===
The property contained 154 acres (62 ha), with two veins worked. One vein was on the contact between the syenitic granite and slate formations, and the other lay entirely in the granite, 600 feet (180 m) to the east, and in the hanging wall. The two veins dipped east at an angle of 36° to 40°. The main shaft was upon the eastern or Providence vein, and the greater part of the work in the past was prosecuted on this vein. The incline shaft was 1,250 feet (380 m) in depth, ten levels being turned, and extending an average distance of 2,000 feet (610 m) on the vein. The Providence vein was a larger one, running from 2 by 20 feet (0.61 m × 6.10 m) in size, and averaging over 6 feet (1.8 m). Four shoots of ore were discovered on it, running from 150 by 320 feet (46 m × 98 m) in length. These ore shoots all trended to the north. The work on this vein consisted of driving and opening ground on the 1,100 feet (340 m) and 1,250 feet (380 m) levels, and sinking the main shaft.

The western, or contact vein, was worked by means of a crosscut from the Providence vein on the 600 feet (180 m) level; this crosscut was about 600 feet (180 m) in length. The ore shoot on this vein was over 300 feet (91 m) in length, and was stoped out from the 600 feet (180 m) level to the surface. This ore was of high grade, the vein averaging 5 feet (1.5 m), and being heavily mineralized. A crosscut was driven from the 1,250 feet (380 m) level of the Providence vein, which gave, when the vein was intersected, 650 feet (200 m) of "backs " on the contact vein.

A Burleigh compressor was added, and a National drill was used in this work. Safety Nitro No.2 powder was the explosive used. There was a forty-stamp mill on the mine, twenty stamps of which were overhauled and were in running order. The entire plant was operated with water power under a fall of 380 feet (120 m) at the mill and 320 feet (98 m) at the hoisting works. The plant was also provided with steam engines, used in case the water supply was temporarily shut off. A Dodd wheel was employed to run the compressor. Twenty-five men were employed in 1893; miners' wages were $3 per day.

== Champion Group ==
By 1919, the Champion Group included Providence, Home (Cadmus), Merrifield, Spanish, Wyoming and Nevada City mines. The owner was the North Star Mine Company at 22 William street, New York City. George B. Agnew, was president, Arthur De Wint Foote was manager, and his son, Arthur Burling Foote, was superintendent.

The Champion property consisted of a consolidation of a number of mines and claims, containing about 440 acres (180 ha) and controlling 8,000 feet (2,400 m) along the Ural and Merrifield veins. The following claims composed the Champion group; the Bavaria, Bayard Taylor, Champion, Clima, Deer Creek (Cadmus) East Home, Home North, Home South, Mary Ann, Miller, Nevada (Merrifield), Nevada City Extension, New Years, New Years Extension, North Wyoming, Phillip, Providence, Schmidt (Nevada City), Soggs, Spanish, Ural (Cornish), Ural (relocation), West Providence, West Providence Extension, West Wyoming, Wyoming, Graves Placer mine, and Swartz Placer mine. The Providence, Champion, Nevada City, Wyoming and Home were the principal producing mines, and the combined production was variously reported to have been from $8,000,000 to $20,000,000.

The' Providence property was purchased by the Champion in 1902. In 1905, however, the Champion was again involved in litigation with the Home (Cadmus) mine, and this suit was also settled in the early part of 1907 by the purchase of the Home holdings by the Champion company. The Home and Cadmus claims lying west of the Providence were developed by short tunnels and shallow shafts until about 1896, when active work began, and in 1902 the Home shaft had reached a depth of 700’, and a 30-stamp mill had been installed.

The Nevada City or Gold Hill mine in which the Northern extension of the Ural vein had been extensively worked from 1880 to 1895 was included in the Champion holdings by purchase, after suffering from legal complications. Two incline shafts were sunk on the vein, one on the Schmidt claim near the southern end line 1000’ deep and the ‘new’ shaft on the Nevada City claim 1100’ northwest of the old shaft. From 1907 to 1911, the Champion mines experienced the usual vicissitudes of fortune that generally follow protracted litigation, when money is used for attorney fees,_rather than for systematic development work. In June, 1908, work was suspended, but a few months later tributers were working, and in 1909 the mine was bonded. Later the bond was forfeited, which led to more lawsuits. In 1911 the North Star Mines Company bonded the property, and after extensive exploration work the Champion group was purchased by the North Star Mines Company. The work so far accomplished by this company consists of unwatering the Champion shaft to the bottom or 2400' level; reopening and driving the 1000’ level 2500’ north on the Ural vein to the Nevada City ore shoot; driving the 2400’ drift north 3000'; crosscutting on the 1600' level connecting the Ural and Merrifield veins, and a drift which was driven a distance 2500’ north of the crosscut on the Merrified vein. Most of the ore being produced in 1914—15 was obtained from the ore bodies of the Nevada City mine.

Owing to the fragmentary records of the gold output of the different properties, it is impossible to accurately ascertain the total production of the consolidated properties, which had been variously estimated over the wide range of from $8,000,000 to $20,000,000. The latter figure is undoubtedly too large. From authentic records, the production of the Champion Company from 1893 to 1913, has been $2,864,528 from 508,910 tons of ore. This total, however, does not include the production of the Providence or Home mines prior to their purchase by the Champion. According to Lindgren the production of the Providence mine from the Ural and Merrifield veins prior to 1896 was estimated-at $5,000,000, but this figure was considered excessive. From the data available, it seems probable that the combined production of the Ural and Merrified veins has been between eight and nine million dollars.

=== Ore and mining conditions ===
The veins in these properties were entirely different from those at Grass Valley, and different methods of timbering and mining were required. The veins were generally not less than 2 feet (0.61 m) thick, and dipped at an average angle of 35 to 40 degrees, so that less shoveling was necessary than at Grass Valley, and less waste had to be handled. There was no specimen ore. The concentrates averaged about 6% of the ore and carried about 30% of the value. The ground was heavy and cost of timbering was high. Modified square setting was used. The life of timbers was said to be not over a year and a half. Long working drifts had to be watched and the ground taken frequently, and caution was needed in the stopes. According to Weed, the developments at the Champion group up to 1917 had not been satisfactory, the average yield not paying for operation in 1916. By 1919, however, the superintendent expressed satisfaction at the grade of ore, and it was evident that conditions had improved greatly since stoping in the deeper levels of the Providence began.

=== Milling ===
The stamp mill contained 40 1,250 pounds (570 kg) stamps. Ore entering the mill from the tramway went over grizzlies. It then went to stamps which dropped 106 times per minute. Only outside amalgamation was used, and the pulp flowed over 6 feet (1.8 m) amalgamating plates to Frenier sand pumps, which sent it to hydraulic classifiers. The slime was sent to thickeners; the sand was concentrated in three double deck and two single deck Deister tables. The concentrate was de-watered, after which it was ground in a tube mill. The middling was sent to two Union Vanners. Tailing went from the tables to 7 sand vats. From the tube mill, the ground concentrate flowed over a 6 feet (1.8 m) amalgamating plate, fines going to cyanide and portion over 200 mesh returning to tube mill for regrinding.

== Bibliography ==
- California State Mineralogist (1890). Annual Report of the State Mineralogist. Vol. 10 (Public domain ed.). State Office.
- California State Mineralogist (1919). Report of the State Mineralogist (Public domain ed.). California State Office.
- Division of Mines and Geology (1893). California Journal of Mines and Geology. Vol. 11. California State Mining Bureau.
- Stevens, Horace Jared; Weed, Walter Harvey; Neale, Walter Garfield (1922). Mines Register: Successor to the Mines Handbook and the Copper Handbook ... Describing the Non-ferrous Metal Mining Companies in the Western Hemisphere . Lenox Hawes Rand, Edward Barney Sturgis, Joseph Zimmerman (Public domain ed.). Mines publications, Incorporated.
