= Foote's Crossing Road =

- U.S. National Register of Historic Places
- Location within California Location within the United States
- Coordinates: 39°25′42″N 120°54′58″W
- Built: 1913
- NRHP reference No.: 81000180
- Added to NRHP: January 29, 1981

Foote's Crossing Road (CA 613) originates in North Columbia, California and winds through the Tahoe National Forest to connect with the community of Alleghany, California. It is a Registered Historic Place.

The high bridge crossing at the Middle Yuba River, named Foote's Crossing (California Point of Historical Interest No. P401), gives the road its name. Alternate names for the road persist, including Tyler Foote Road, Tyler-Foote Road, Tyler Foote Crossing Road or Tyler-Foote Crossing Road due to Cherokee, California, west of North Columbia, once being known as "Tyler".

== History ==
Mary Hallock Foote's husband, the civil and mining engineer Arthur De Wint Foote, became manager of Grass Valley's North Star Mine after building its powerhouse in 1895. In 1911, O'Brien, Foote & Associates purchased the Tightner Mine in Alleghany. Foote built the road in 1913 to establish a better route between the two mines. The road was significant during the period of 1913–1924 both as an engineering accomplishment and as an improved transportation route.

== Structure ==
At a cost of $85,000, using manpower and animals, not machinery, it took six months to build the road, a portion of which is a narrow, roughly-graded, single-lane wagon shelf road, while other parts are paved. Wagons wound around bluffs 500 feet (150 m) above the canyons below. Italian stonemasons built the high stone embankment walls prevalent on the tight curves above the Middle Yuba River. Views of jagged, granite ridges abound along the way.

== Route ==
The Nevada County portion of the road begins in what is now Nevada County's unincorporated community of North Columbia and passes Columbia Hill. before crossing Grizzly Creek, and then the middle fork of the Yuba River.

The Tightner Mining Company and Sierra County jointly built the Sierra County portion of the road, which skirts Kanaka Creek and the Lafayette Ridge on the road's southern side, but does cross Blue Ravine and Rapps Ravine. The Sierra County portion of the road is 13 miles (21 km) shorter than the older road.
