= North Star Mine and Powerhouse =

Historic mine in Grass Valley, California

North Star
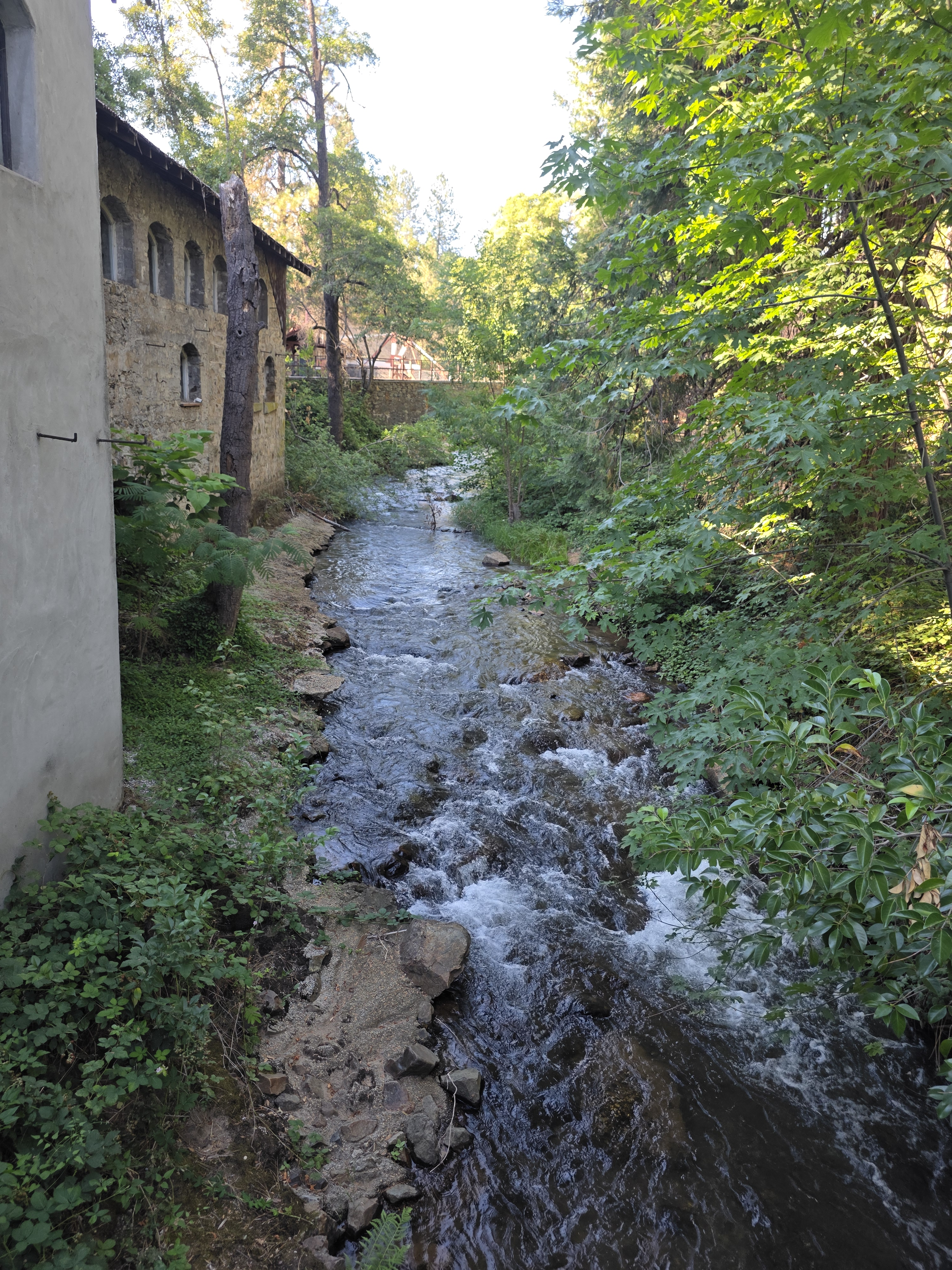
- Boston Ravine, Wolf Creek and the North Star Mine and Powerhouse

- Location in California
- Location: South end of Mill Street at Allison Ranch Road, on Lafayette Hill, California, United States; 39°11′39″N 121°04′35″W
- Products: Gold
- Opened: 1851
- Closed: 1956
- Company: City of Grass Valley

The North Star Mine and Powerhouse are an historic gold mine and associated power generating facility located on Lafayette Hill in the Grass Valley Mining District, a short distance south of Grass Valley, California. It was the second largest producer of gold during California's Gold Rush. In 1898, the largest Pelton wheel for its time was built for the mine. The North Star Mine Company also owned locations on Weimar Hill, adjoining and south of the North Star Mine. It shut down during World War II after its consolidation with the Empire Mine.

== Geography ==
The mine is located by Wolf Creek, on Auburn Road, 1 mile (1.6 km) west of the Empire Mine. It is approximately 65 acres (26 ha) in size and situated in a southerly direction, the north boundary of the North Star being at an average distance of 430 feet (130 m) southerly from the Irish-American Mine. Within the surface boundaries of the North Star, there is a ledge of rock known as the "North Star Ledge", its top or apex wholly within the surface boundaries.

== History ==
The French Lead, or North Star vein, was discovered in the Fall of 1851 by the Lavance Brothers, who with nine other Frenchmen, formed the Helvetia and Lafayette Gold Mining Company. In 1858, the sheriff sold the company to Edward McLaughlin to settle an $8,000 judgement. In February 1860, it was purchased for $15,000 by the owners of the North Star Group, which became the North Star Quartz Mining Co. in 1861. The North Star Gold Mining co. was incorporated in 1867. The mine shut down in 1875 after reaching a depth of 1,200 feet. The North Star Mining Co. was incorporated in May 1884, by William Bowers Bourn II, and the mine was reopened. Bourn sold the North Star to James Duncan Hague in 1887. Hague reorganized the company as the North Star Mines Co. in 1889, and acquired Gold Hill, New York Hill, and the Massachusetts Hill mines.

The Lafayette Hill ledge by Wolf Creek was pronounced by the State Geologist in 1855 as being one of the best-producing for quartz mining in California.In the 1860s, reserves were estimated to be not less than thirty thousand tons, worth in the aggregate of $900,000.

Competition between Grass Valley Gold District's 95 mines was fierce, forcing them to open, close, and re-open at various times. Each was concerned with power sources to extract the gold. Many, like the North Star, used wood-fired engines to generate steam, depending on the surrounding forest for firewood. The North Star Mine was the Grass Valley Gold District's deepest mine, measuring 4,000 feet (1,200 m) vertical depth.

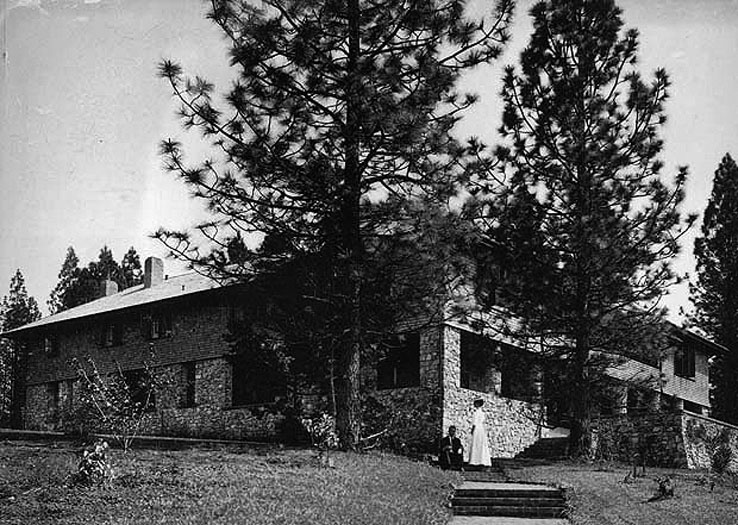
The North Star House was designed by Julia Morgan and is 1.5 miles from the North Star Mine.

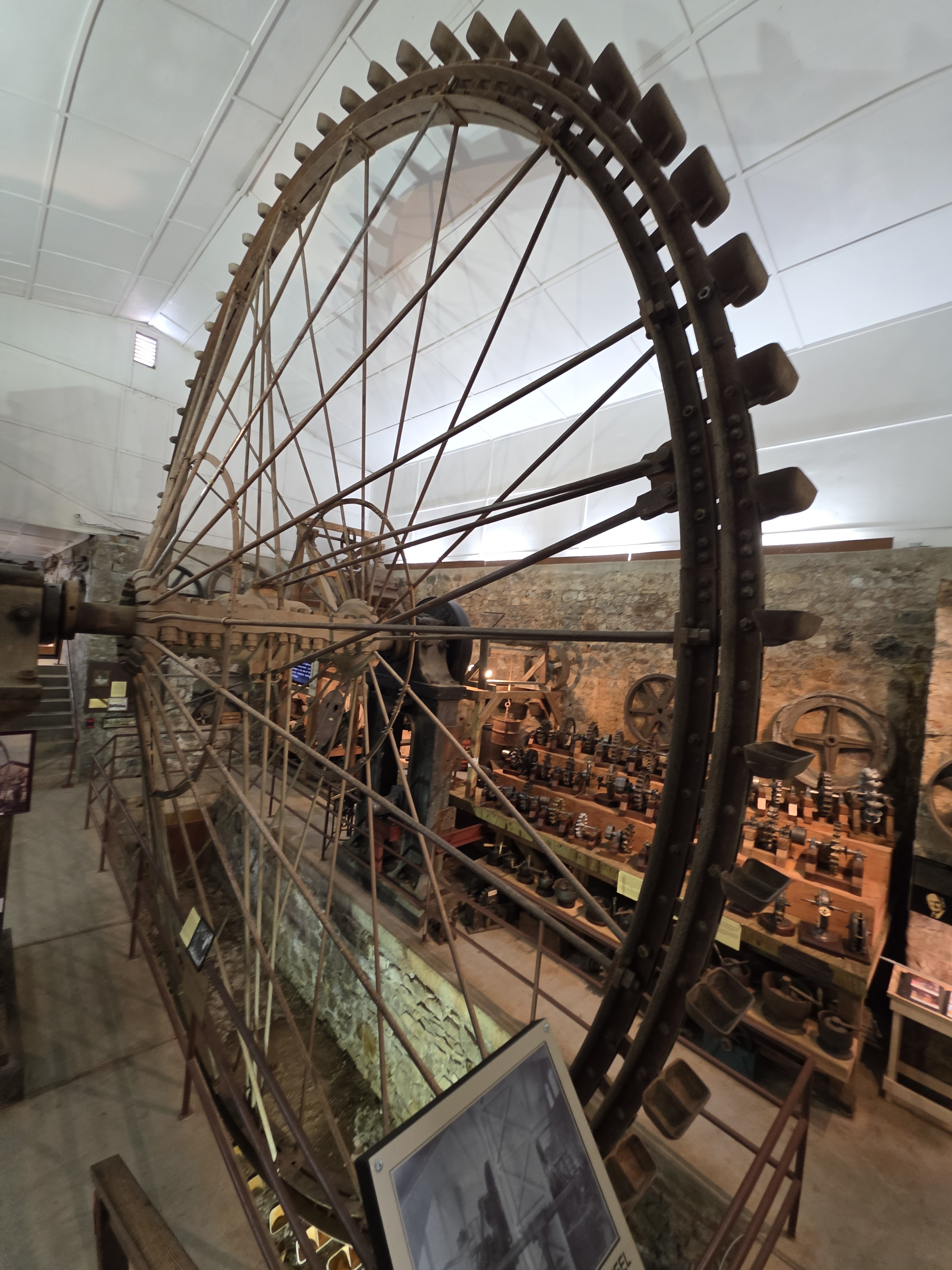
The thirty foot diameter Pelton wheel in the powerhouse

In 1895, Arthur De Wint Foote settled in Grass Valley, having been hired to design and construct an electric-generating plant for the mine. At the mine's powerhouse, he installed the largest operating Pelton water wheel to that date; it was the largest tangential water wheel in the world. The powerhouse is a designated California Historical Landmark. In 1901, the North Star "Central" vertical shaft reached the North Star vein at 1630 feet. In 1905, Julia Morgan designed a mansion for Foote and his wife, the illustrator and writer Mary Hallock Foote; the North Star House was listed on the National Register of Historic Places in 2011.

In 1911, the North Star Mines Company purchased the Champion-Providence Mine (which was itself a consolidation of two adjoining mines). Also in 1911, with his partners, Foote purchased the Tightner Mine in Alleghany, California. Two years later, in 1913, he designed and built Foote's Crossing Road along the Middle Yuba River to improve transportation between the two mines; the road became a National Register of Historic Places landmark.

Foote's son, Arthur Burling Foote, who started at the North Star as an assistant, went on to become the mine's manager after his father's retirement in 1913. In 1918, the North Star brought suit against the Empire Mine for underground encroachment upon its claim, but the boundaries were resolved, and the matter never went to trial. In 1927, the Central shaft reached a depth of 3700 feet (8600 level). By 1928, the North Star's total output value was approximately $33 million. The following year, Newmont Mining Corporation purchased the Empire Mine and the North Star Mine, consolidating them to become Empire-Star Mines, Ltd. The Empire-Star was forced to shut down by the U.S. War Production Board during World War II. After the war, a shortage of skilled miners forced the suspension of operations in the deeper portions of the mine by 1951. Mining operations were suspended on 5 July 1956, due to a local labor union strike.

== Miners ==
Superintendents and administrators of the mine included William H. Rodda (later of the Norambagua Mine), John C. Coleman, his brother, Edward Coleman, and Arthur De Wint Foote. Its early owners were all miners such J. C. Coleman, E. Colman, W. H. Rodda, Josiah Rodda, John Rodda, William Kitto, William Hosken, William H. Thomas, James Dods and John Harper. The mine and mill employed over seventy men. Three-quarters of them had emigrated here from Cornwall, England where they had worked in the depressed tin mines. These Cornish miners introduced the Cornish pump and the Cornish pastie to the area.

== Mining operations ==
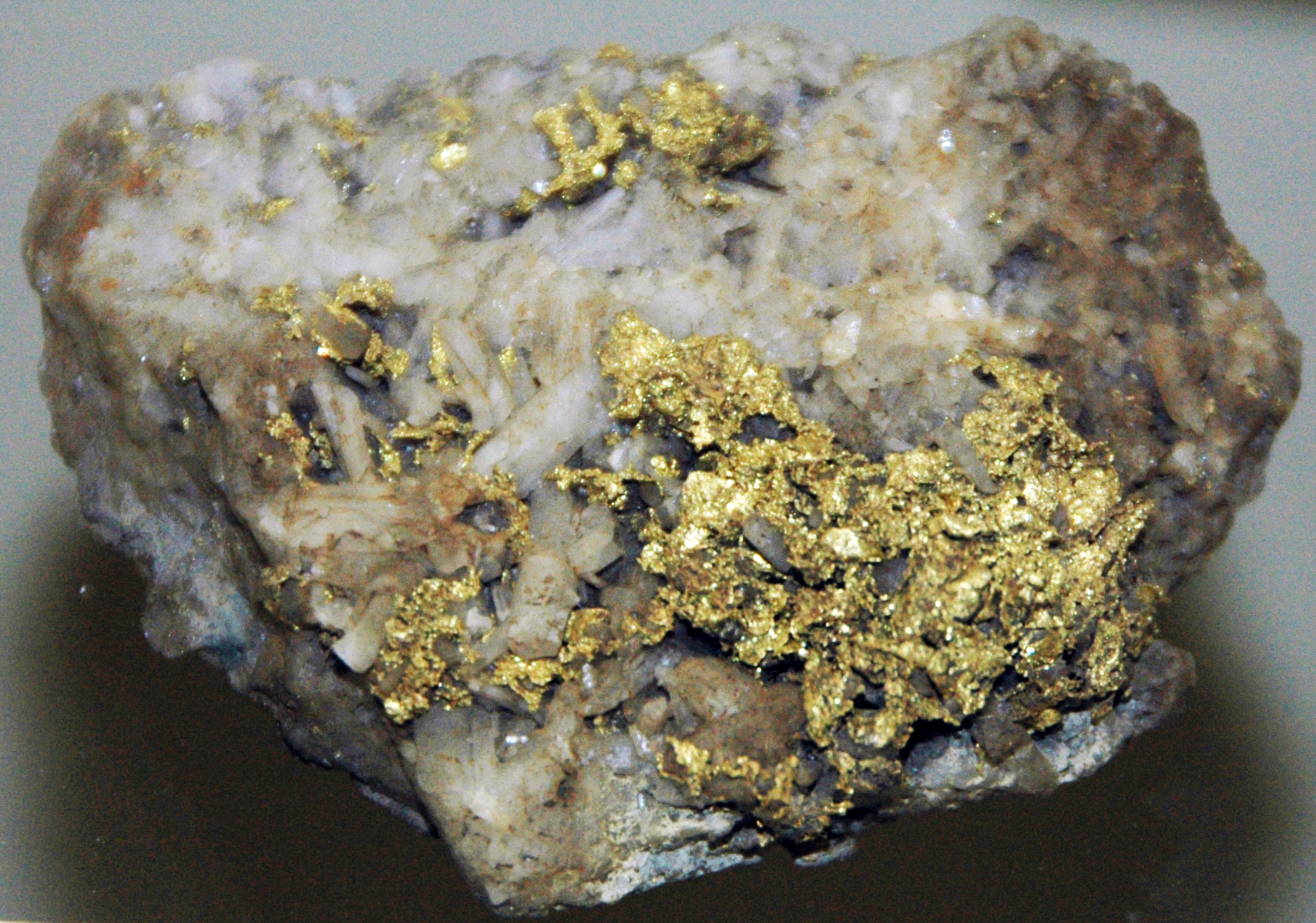
Gold on quartz, North Star Mine

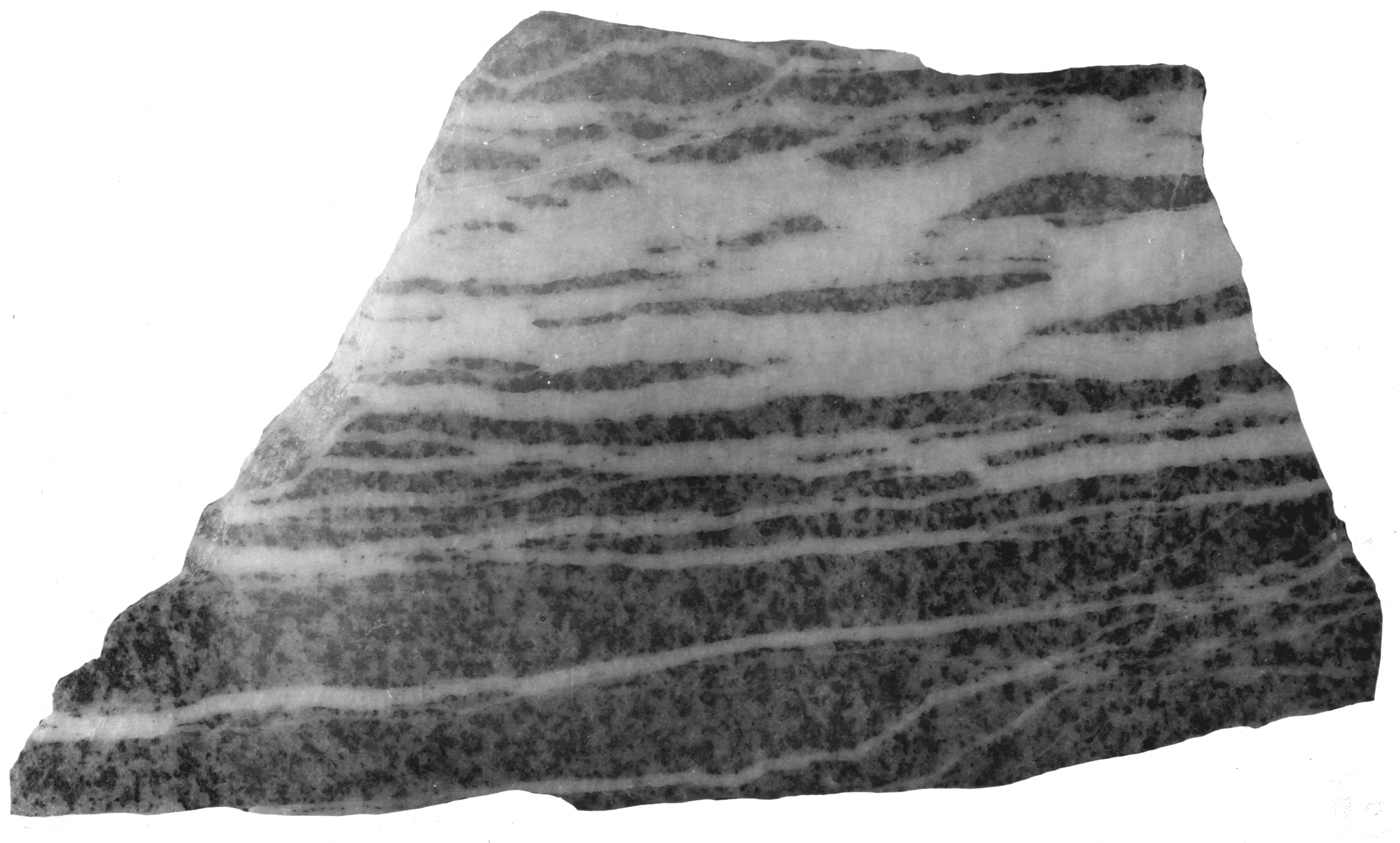
North Star sheeted veinlets, polished slab of granodiorite showing sheeted zone of carbonate veinlets.

The North Star vein has an east and west course, with a dip of about twenty-three degrees to the north. This mine was opened by an incline shaft sunk on the course of the vein to a depth of nearly 700 feet (210 m). The lowest perpendicular depth attained was approximately 300 feet (91 m). It was opened by seven levels. The vein varied in thickness from a few inches to 4–5 feet (1.2–1.5 m), with an average of about 2 feet (0.61 m). The explorations in the fifth level extended about 700 feet (210 m) east of the shaft. The total known extent was estimated at 1,000 feet (300 m). The lower level was driven 550 feet (170 m) east of the shaft. Above the three lower levels, the ground was virgin to surface, and little was extracted from the two next to the bottom. The ore was raised by tram wagons on the incline, with a wire rope. The vein was enclosed in greenstone. A vertical hoisting and ventilation shaft was sunk 800 feet (240 m) east of the incline. This shaft was set to cut the mine on the level of the fourth gallery. The shoots of ore in this ground had an easterly pitch. The ore had a gradually increasing tenor of gold.

== North Star Mine Company ==
The North Star Mine Company owned 2,100 feet (640 m) upon the course of the lode. Between 1861 and 1865, the net returns were approximately $500,000, about one-fourth of which was expended in permanent improvements on the property. These included the drain tunnel, half a mile long, which was the most considerable item, and a new mill of sixteen stamps. About US$375,000 of the net savings were returned to the owners in dividends, obtained from the use of a six stamp mill during 1862–63, which was subsequently enlarged. The returns for the year 1866 were $315,000, derived from the crushing of 6,000 tons of ore. The ores of this mine are considerably sulphuretted, but the value of the sulphurets in gold was much less than in the nearby Eureka Mine. The North Star did not possess chlorination works, but dressed their tailings by hand rockers for sale. The ores showed free gold, often in very fine masses, implanted in quartz, which resembles that of the nearby Rocky Bar Mine and Massachusetts Hill Mine.

== Mill ==
The sixteen stamp mill, erected in 1866, had a capacity of crushing about two tons to the stamp daily. The water in this mine was light, a supply for the use of the amalgamation works being derived from a neighboring ditch company. This circumstance, as well as the low angle of the dip of the vein, favored very greatly the economy of development of the North Star to a great depth.

== Powerhouse ==
When the mining operations expanded subsequent to the California Gold Rush, the powerhouse was added. In 1895, it became the site of the largest tangential water wheel in the world.

In 1878, Lester Pelton of Camptonville brought a strange machine to the Miners Foundry in nearby Nevada City. The Pelton wheel, about the size of a car tire and referred to as "Wheel One", was put on display for mine owners. It used cups on a wheel to draw water and harness power. Running out of trees to burn, the North Star decided to switch to hydraulic power, and Arthur De Wint Foote designed the 30-foot (9.1 m) wheel which drove four new compressors that delivered 90 pounds (41 kg) of air pressure for 2,000 feet (610 m) to the mine's central shaft. For his ingenuity, Foote was made the North Star's superintendent.

The powerhouse has been turned into the North Star Mine and Powerhouse & Pelton Wheel Museum. The New Verde Mining Company donated an acre of land and the remains of the old power house. The wheel was saved from the scrap heap by a Grass Valley resident who raised $2,000 to purchase the wheel and donated it to the Historical Society. The wheel now turns with the assistance of an electric motor. The powerhouse is also a designated California Historical Landmark. Its plaque's inscription reads:

NORTH STAR MINE POWERHOUSE

The North Star Powerhouse, built by A. D. Foote in 1895, was the first complete plant of its kind. Compressed air, generated by Pelton water wheels, furnished power for the entire mine operation. The 30-foot Pelton wheel was the largest in the world, and was in continuous use for over 30 years.

Plaque placed by the State Department of Parks and Recreation in cooperation with the Nevada County Historical Society 15 May 1971.

== Gallery ==
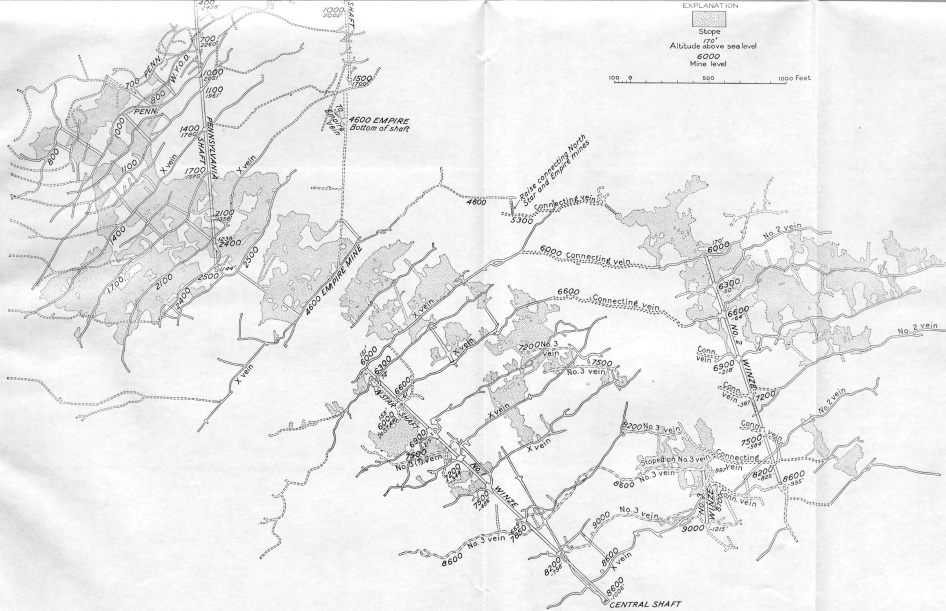
North Star Mine Map

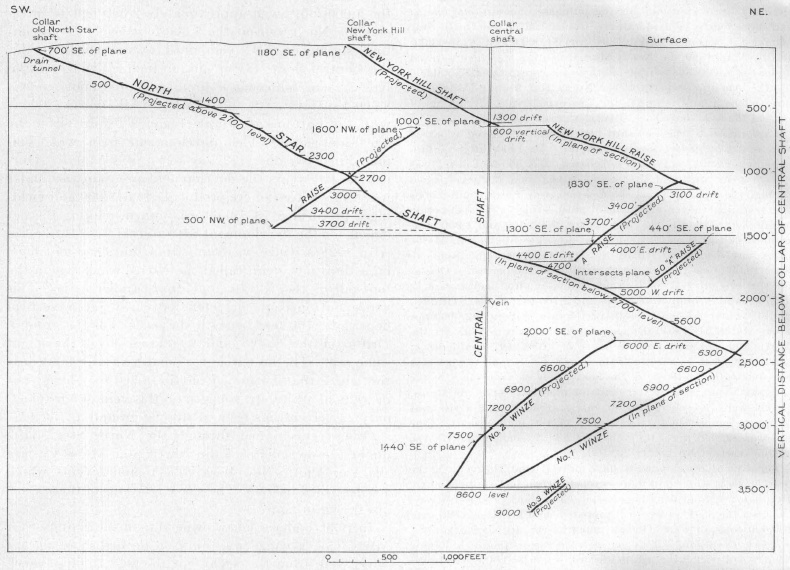
North Star Mine Cross Section

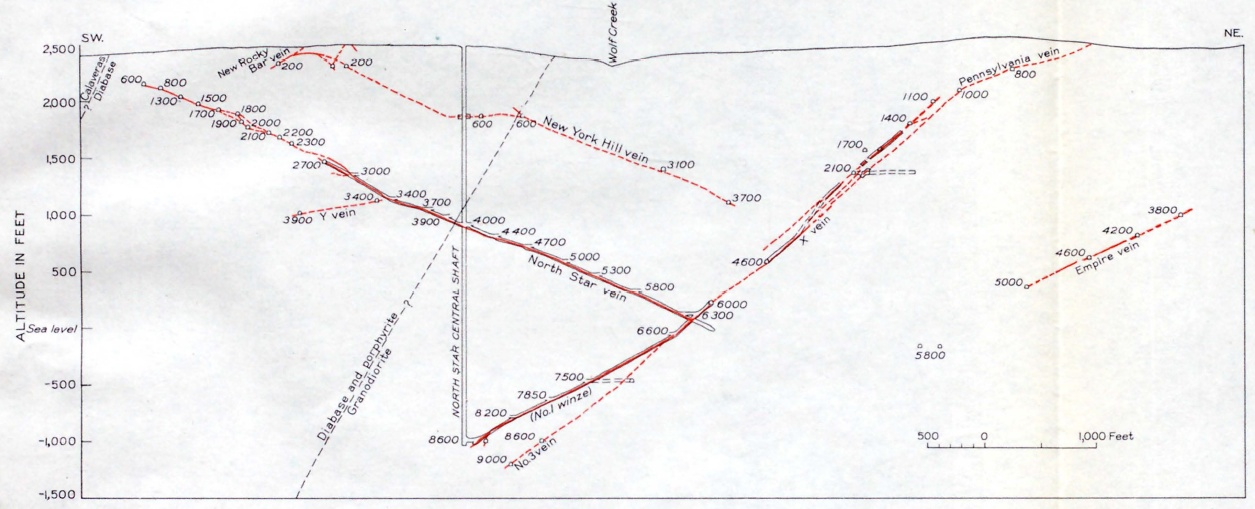
North Star Mine Geologic Cross Section

== See also ==
- Empire Mine
- California Historical Landmarks in Nevada County
