= Grass Valley Mining District =

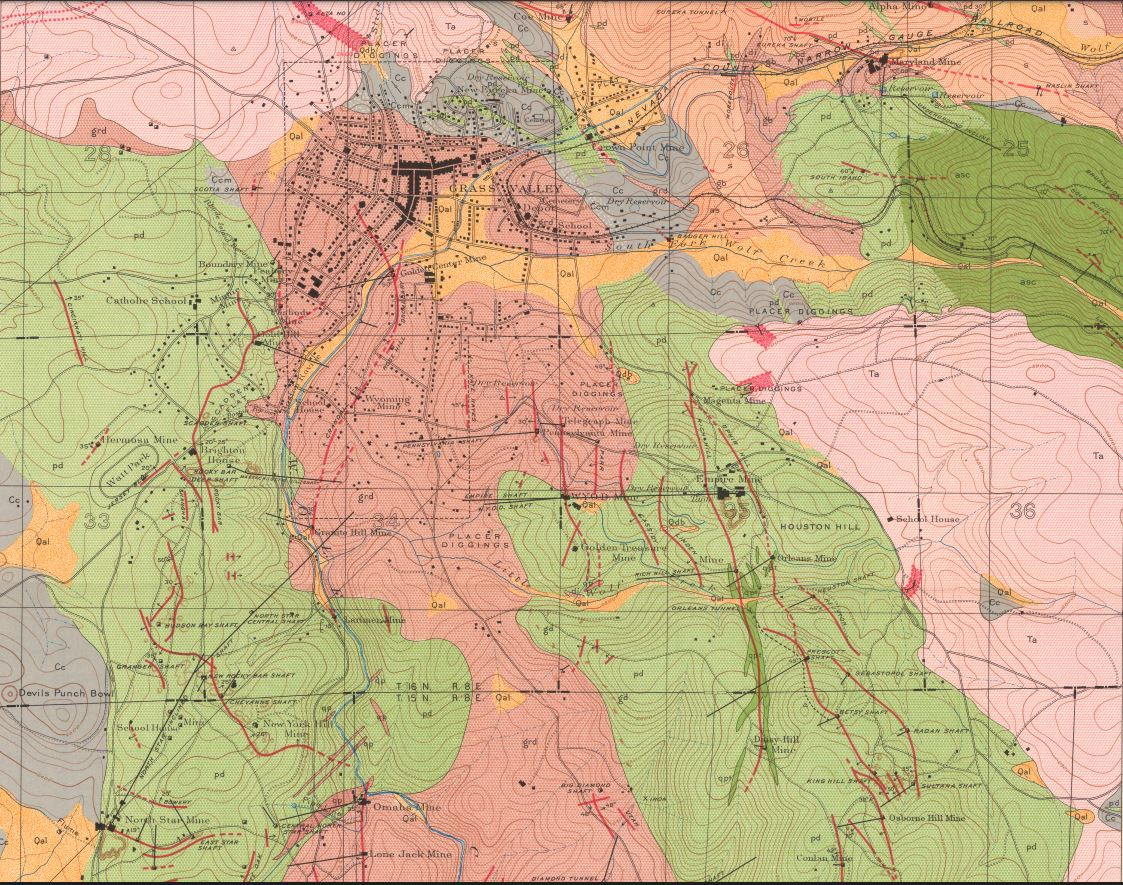
Grass Valley geologic map (1940)

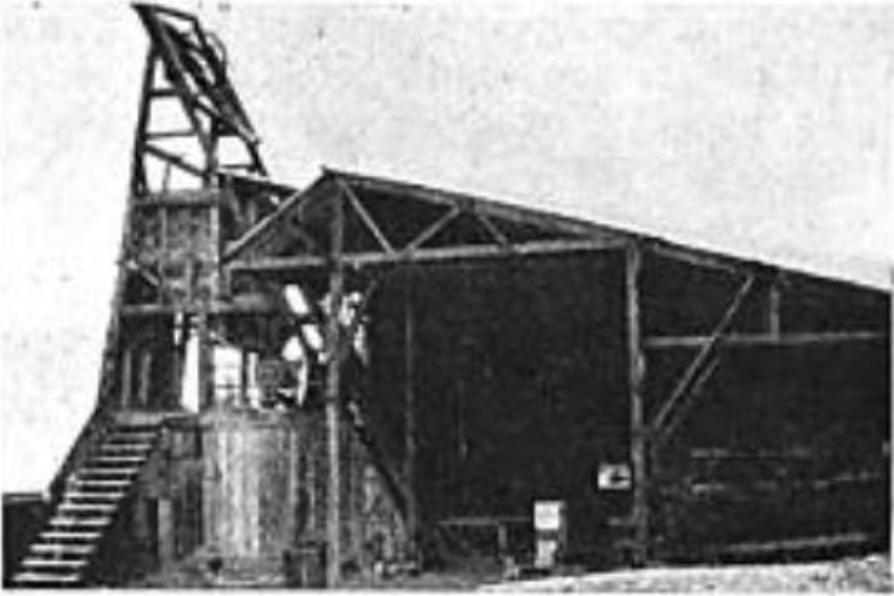
Alcade mine surface plant (1924)

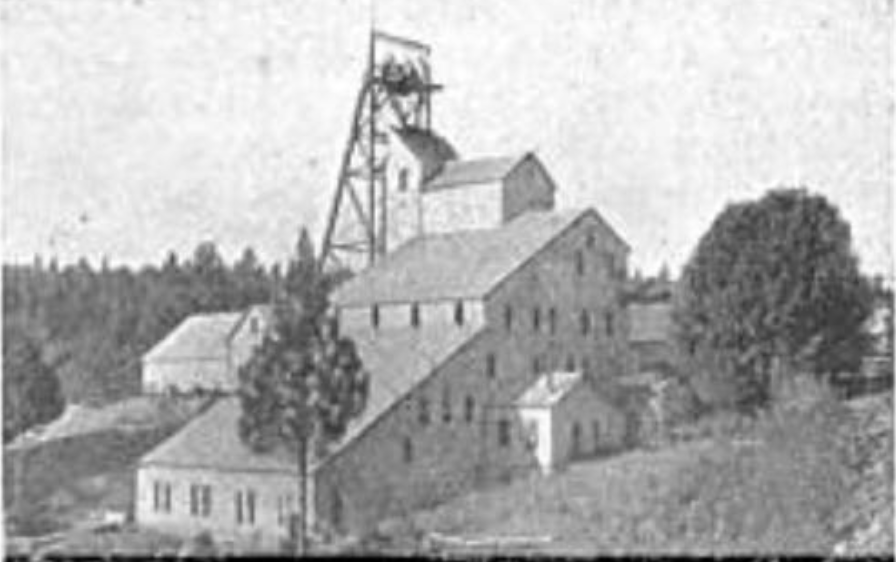
Brunswick mine and mill (1924)

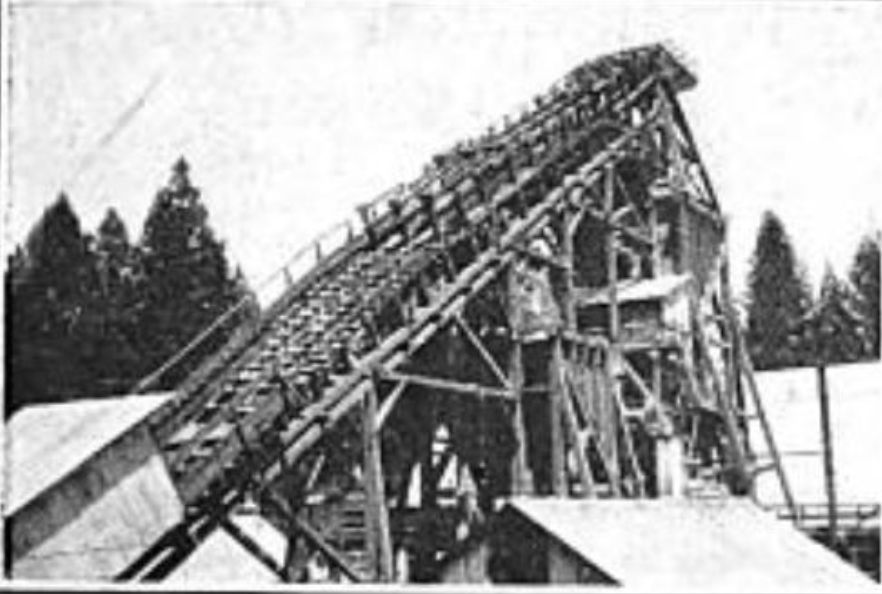
Empire mine (1924)

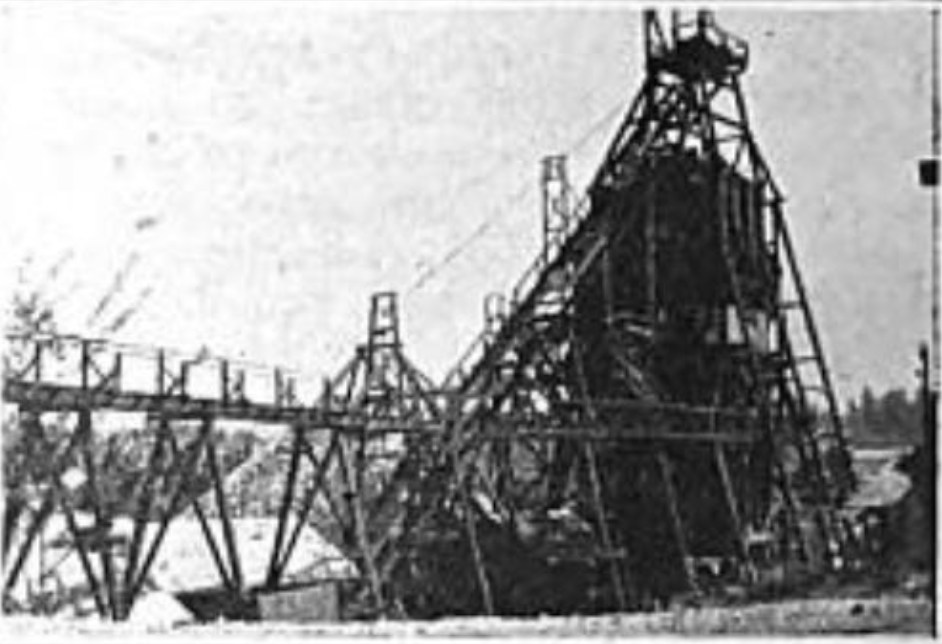
Golden Center mine (1924)

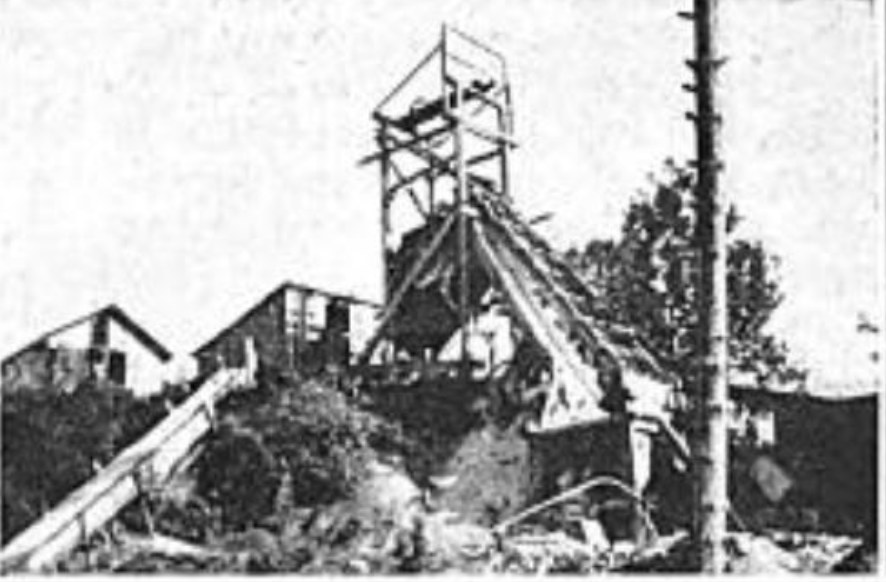
Gold Wedge mine (1924)

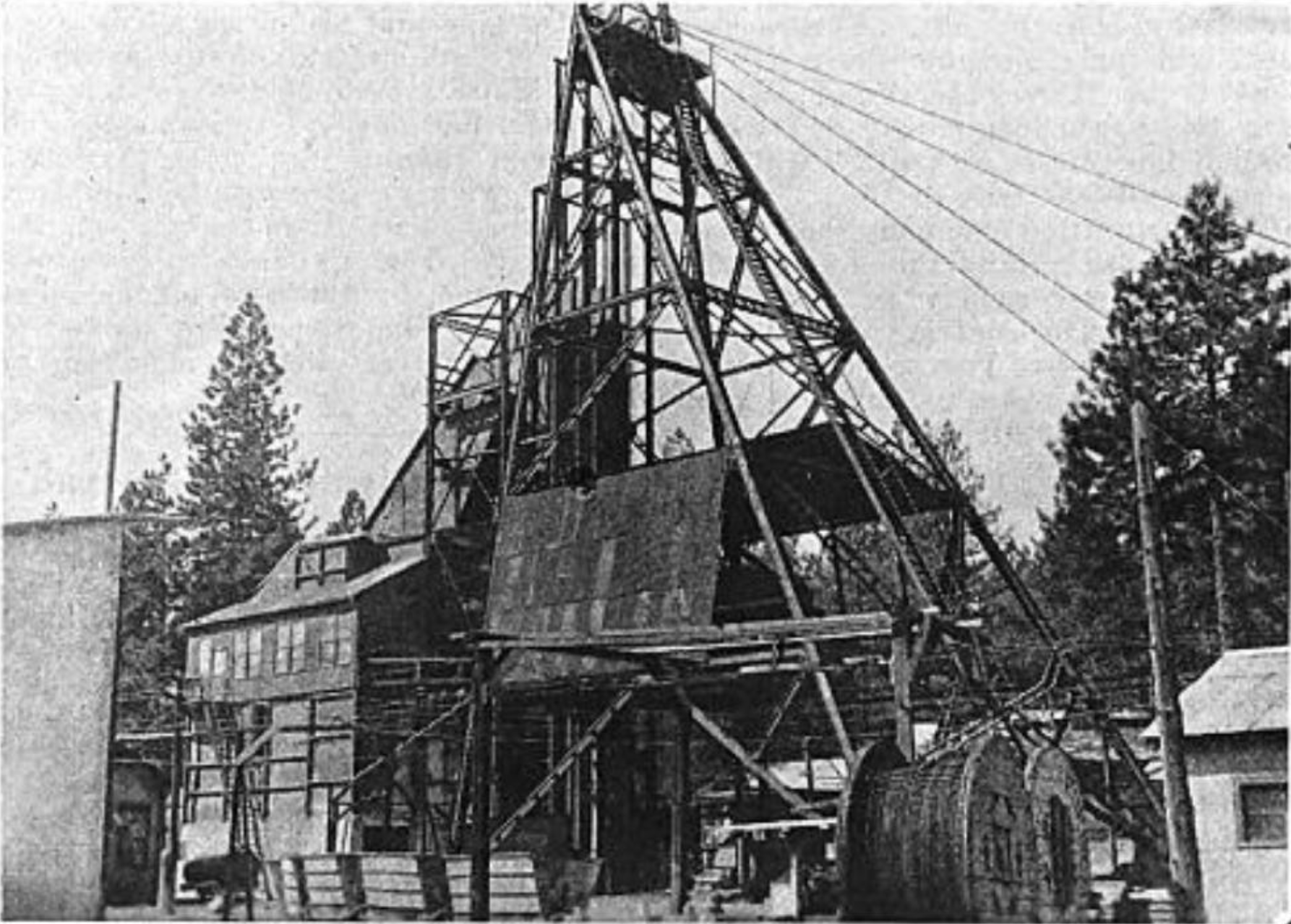
Idaho-Maryland mine (1924)

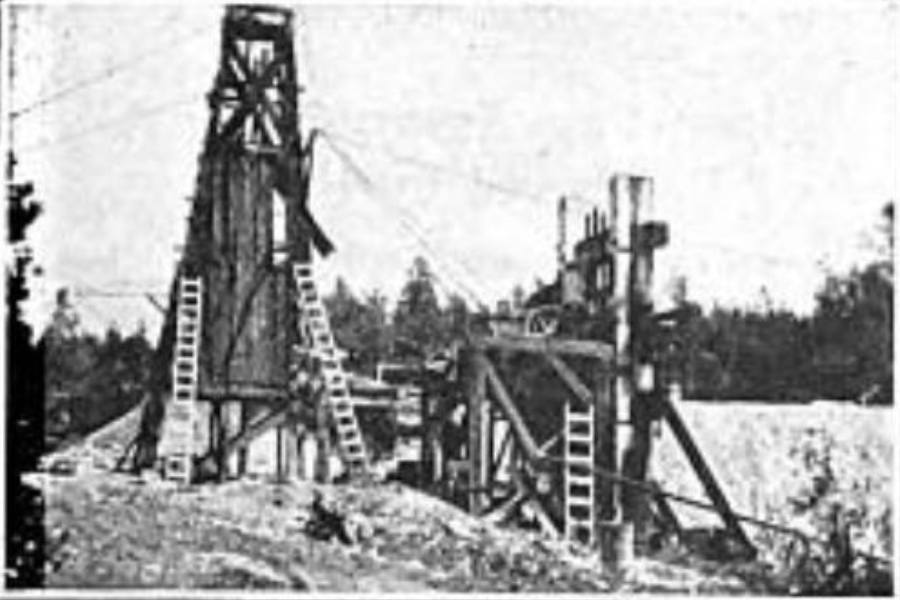
Normandie-Dulmaine mine (1924)

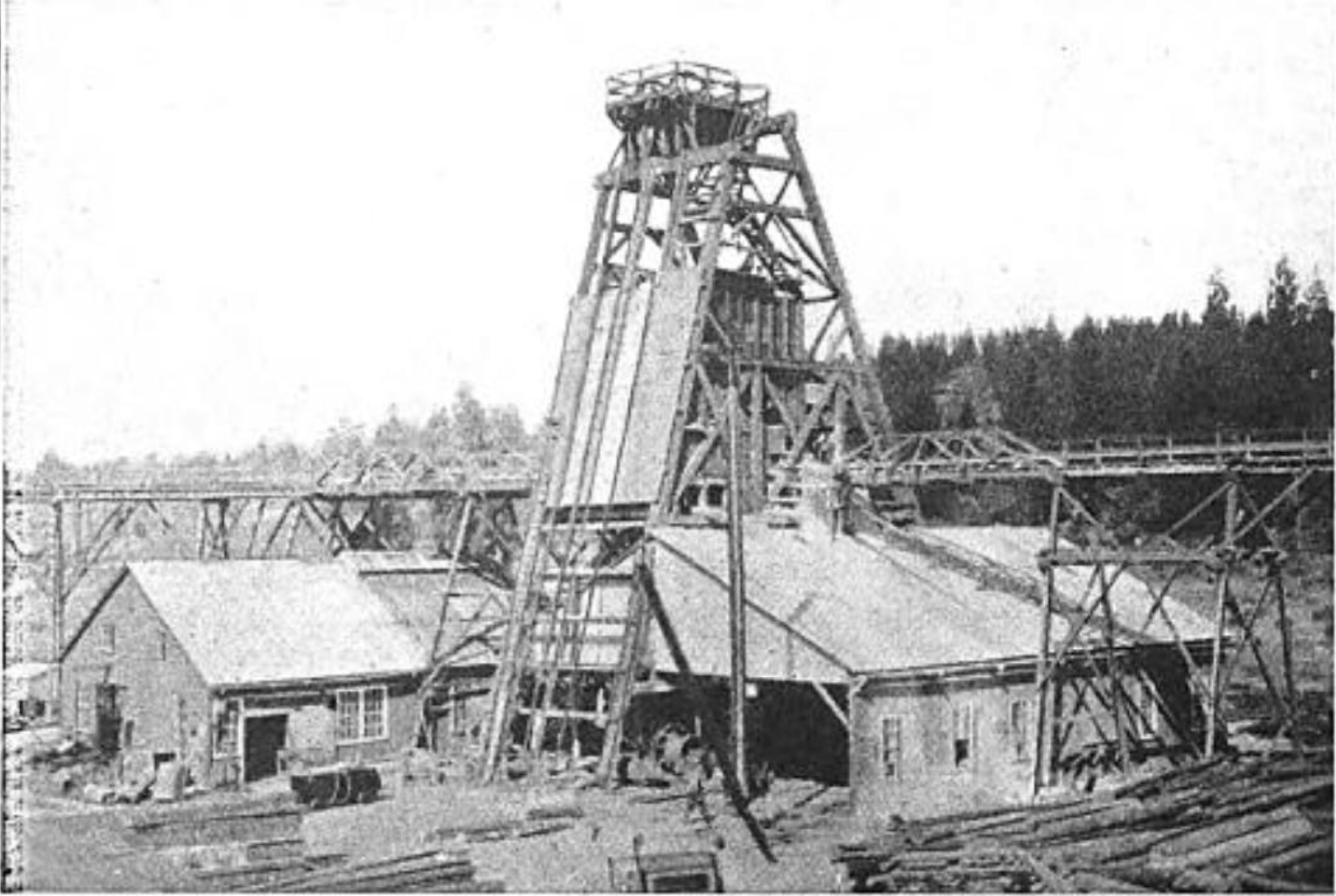
North Star mine (1924)

The Grass Valley Mining District, located in Grass Valley, California, was associated with the history of U.S. gold mining during the California Gold Rush. The district, from the time that quartz mining began and for at least forty years thereafter, had one or more quartz mines continuously producing at a profit; a like statement could not being made for any other mining district on the Pacific Coast. The district was the oldest, best known, and most reliable and prosperous quartz mining district in California. Quartz mining began with the discovery of gold quartz in Gold Hill, in the year 1850, and continued with unabated prosperity to the 18902. The ore was, in most cases, a well-ribboned quartz, containing in addition to the disseminated free gold, a considerable percentage of pyrite, with galena, chalcopyrite, and blende in smaller quantities. The gold was heavy, frequently very coarse, and of a nature easily recovered in the mills; when inside battery plates were used, the percentage recovered in the battery varied from 65 to 90 per cent of the free gold contents. The percentage of pyrite and accompanying minerals varied from 1 to 5 per cent; the resultant concentrates were of good grade, running from US$50 to US$300 per ton, and were usually sold to the neighboring chlorination works. Of the total available contents of the Grass Valley ores, a very large proportion, 90 to 95 per cent, was recovered in the shape of free gold, the remaining 5 to 10 per cent being in the concentrates. The noteworthy features of the Grass Valley veins were the reliability and permanence of the rich pay shoots in depth, and the high grade and free-milling properties of the ores.

== Location ==
The district was situated in the midst of the largest, the most important and prosperous gold quartz mining district in California, in the heart of the auriferous zone extending along the western flank of the Sierra Nevada mountains, at 2,470 feet (750 m) AMSL.

== Geology ==
The geology of the Grass Valley District was quite varied, the principal mines occurring in three distinct formations, each of which contained valuable and profitable properties. The two principal formations were the diabase, in which the majority of the mines occurred, and the syenite, which merged into quartz diorite, coming next in the amount of territory covered. Just north of the town of Grass Valley, a narrow belt of serpentine, varying in width between 0.25–1 mile (0.40–1.61 km), crosses the country, striking a little to the north of west and south of east. The Eureka Mine, long since worked out, and the Idaho, with the Maryland as its future successor, are the only mines of prominence that have been found in this serpentine belt. The Idaho vein lies between a foot wall of gabbro, with a diorite hanging wall. The Idaho has a greater record of production than any mine in the district, with its lowest workings at a depth of 2,000 feet vertical.

== History ==
For decades, remunerative operations were quietly but continuously carried on in that region, until finally, the economic merits of its phenomenal belt of auriferous, pyritous quartz lodes, and the conservatism of management and business success that have attended mining in that part of California, won for Grass Valley a reputation as a permanent, legitimate gold mining center, second to none of the mineral districts, either in the United States or in foreign countries.

It was hard to find a camp that, in proportion to its size and importance, has been freer from the speculative craze and disasters that were sometimes connected with the working of claims adjacent to ore-deposits of exceptional value in the western U.S. Nor was it easy to find in the annals of American quartz mining a group of mines whose working was rewarded with more gratifying, more regular, and longer continued returns, and whose profitable operation was more assured for many years to come, than the Idaho, North Star, and Empire mines, which were in their day the leading producers and dividend-payers of the Grass Valley belt.

The discoveries of gold quartz in place in this section of Nevada County in the year 1850, following the extensive opening of important placer mines that had begun at an earlier date, were among the first in California. This county contained in a marked degree every form of gold deposit known in the state; and as an annual bullion producer of about US$4,000,000 in gold and some US$60,000 in silver, the latter contained in the sulphuret concentrates from the milling process, it outranked every other county in the State, with Amador, Placer, and Sierra following next in order.

The known lode-bearing area of the Grass Valley District was comparatively small for the number of veins it contained. Its outside limits were over 7 by 4 miles (11.3 km × 6.4 km), which region was joined by the Nevada City Mining District to the north. But the most noted tract of great developed veins belonging to the Grass Valley District proper was embraced within a radius of about 2 miles (3.2 km), in which the number of lodes, and the qualitative and quantitative uniformity of the ore they carried, were peculiarly favorable to great productiveness and permanent prosperity.

For numerous reasons of business policy, the publication of mineral records and statistics of production were in many instances been only fragmentary. It was notable that the miners avoided the customary advertisement. This loyalty to and belief in the Grass Valley lode system were attested by the numerous subscriptions of miners and local residents to the stocks of companies formed to reopen temporarily suspended and mismanaged properties. Grass Valley, like all mining districts, had its tribulations and set-backs, which, were owing more to irregular and unsystematic mining and milling and to an imperfect knowledge of local vein phenomena than to any other cause. Several prominent mines, with their gold outputs, are illustrative of the rich productive character and possibilities of Grass Valley lodes: Idaho, North Star, Empire, Eureka, Allison Ranch, Gold Hill, Rocky Bar, Massachusetts Hill, Pittsburg, and New York Hill.

The Grass Valley industry, as a whole, since the early days, was somewhat erratic in character. At first, one property would loom into prominence, and, through the continuation of its profitable operation for a long period, an impetus would be imparted to the development of other ledges, which, in turn, would become paying properties. Then, after combined activity for a number of years, some irregularities would set in and cause one or more mines to suspend. Alınost all of these stand-stills, however, cold be traced to a change of ownership or administration, or to the encountering of water or some misunderstood and much exaggerated freak of vein geology; but these crippled enterprises were almost immediately succeeded by a new group coming into the field of active producers.

The most conspicuously favorable features of the Grass Valley belt were found in the facts that, first, the bottoms of all the active properties were in good ore, some quite above the average grade, which gave rise to claims of increasing richness in depth; secondly, that the occasional accidents and interruptions in the working of the mines was not brought about, in most instances, by a giving out of the ore either in depth or in the direction of the strike (measured across the chimneys), for many of the inactive claims were known to have faces of pay-ore exposed in the extremity workings, on the strike and dip, and also standing in some of the stope contours.

The basis of the long-continued remunerative mining at Grass Valley, which stood up against many extravagances of management, lay in the remarkable continuity and persistency of the ore proper in the ore-bearing ground and in the liberal proportion of such ore ground to the total vein area. This ideal lode development in respect to the quantity of pay-ore, which was favorably distributed in chutes or chimneys of unusual width, as compared with the ordinary proportion of the width of a chimney to its extent on the trend, fairly assumed the appearance of continuous ore zones or sheets of ore running through the entire claim, and broken alone by occasional spots of lean ground.

The Grass Valley mines were not sustained by huge chamber bonanza ore-bodies, in point of thickness between walls, neither did they depend for their life on a thin, high grade, sensational pay-streak. for there was an abundance of lodes with as rich ore. But the district was supported by a lode system containing extensive, never-failing, and generous ore-channels, of which class of ore-deposits these mines were typical representatives.

Taking collectively the records of all forms of gold deposits in Nevada County, it was highly probable that no mining district of equal area existed that produced as much gold. And while it was the case that the annual production eventually became diminished, owing to the depression in placer mining following the sweeping legal decisions on the debris question, yet the flourishing condition of the quartz mining industry justified the assertion that no known region in its day had the promise of greater mining permanency than that of the Grass Valley Mining district.

The object of the miners' strike during the month of June 1869 was to prevent the introduction of giant powder as a blasting agent. This strike was characterized as unjust and uncalled for. In the first place, the Grass Valley mines, being mostly on narrow veins, were burdened with heavy costs of extraction of ore, and the old-fashioned system of large double drills and black powder was, under such conditions, peculiarly expensive. In order to get room to swing a sledge, the stopes had to made much wider than the vein, and wider than they would need to be for single drilling. In consequence of the quantity of water in many places, (and invariably in the bottom of the shaft,) a great deal of time was lost in charging and tamping holes with common powder, and the practice of working two men at each hole resulted in much more idleness than would be the case if the men worked singly, since whenever one of them stopped for any cause, the other stopped also. Finally, the old system of organization gave the miners many opportunities, of which they availed themselves, to pilfer small specimens of the very rich gold quartz which so frequently occurred in the mines of this district. In Statistics of Mines and Mining in the States and Territories West of the Rock Mountains (1870), the United States Department of the Treasury recorded that a well-known peculiarity of Cornish miners in the Grass Valley Mining District had no conscience concerning the stealing of specimens, and did not consider it wrong to cheat concerning the underground work. In spite of all precautions, the plundering was known to be considerable.

From the best obtainable data by the California State Mining Bureau in 1891, it was estimated that the quartz mines of Grass Valley had produced over US$100,000,000 in gold bullion.

By 1924, mining activity on more than a nominal scale in the Grass Valley District was restricted to three mines, the Empire, the North Star, and the Idaho Maryland. For the most part, the surrounding area contiguous to these three mines was inactive until 1924 when a number of small properties were rehabilitated, and exploration began anew. In addition, there was a consolidation of old properties into several groups where were in the throes of preliminary financing or sale. In this year, about 1,100 workers were employed in the district.

== List of mines ==
The list of mines within the district included: Ajax, Alaska, Alcade, Allison Ranch, Alpha, Bella Union, Ben Franklin, Big Diamond, Black Hawk, Bow, Boundary, Buena Vista, Bullion, Cassidy (Linden), Centennial, Cheranne, Coe , Conlan, Crown Point, Daisy Hill, Dakota, Diamond, East Star, Empire, Empire-Star group, Empire West, Empress, Eureka, Gaston, General Grant, Gladstone, Golden Center (Dromedary), Golden Gate, Golden Treasure, Gold Hill, Gold Point, Goodall, Granite Hill, Grant, Hartery, Hermosa, Heuston, Homeward Bound, Houston Hill, Idaho, Idaho-Maryland group, Independence, Inkmarque, Kate Hayes, Larimer, Le Duc, Lone Jack, Magenta, Mary Ann, Maryland, Massachusetts, Massachusetts Hill New Brunswick, New Eureka, New Homeward Bound, New Ophir New York Hill, Normandy-Dulmaine, Northern Bell, North Star, Norumbagua, Oakland, Old Brunswick, Old Eureka, Old Homeward Bound, Omaha, Orleans, Osborne Hill, Peabody, Pennsylvania, Phoenix, Polar Star, Prescott Hill, Prudential, Republic, Reward, Rich Hill, Rocky Bar, Rose Hill, Scotia, Sebastopol, South Idaho, Spring Hill, Stockton Hill, St. John, Sultana, Syndicate, Telegraph, Union Hill, Wisconsin, Wyoming, W.Y.O.D.

== See also ==
- Woodruff v. North Bloomfield Gravel Mining Company
