= Empire Mine State Historic Park =

State-protected site in California

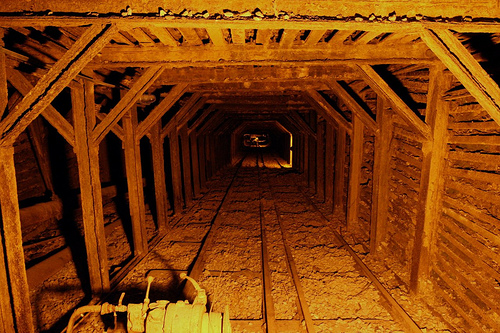
- View along the main drift at Empire Mine

- Location within California Location within the United States
- Location: Nevada County, California, United States
- Nearest city: Grass Valley, California
- Coordinates: 39°12′13″N 121°2′34″W
- Area: 853 acres (345 ha)
- Established: 1975
- Governing body: California Department of Parks and Recreation
- Empire Mine
- U.S. National Register of Historic Places
- U.S. Historic district
- California Historical Landmark
- Area: 777 acres (314 ha)
- Built: 1896
- Architect: Polk, Willis
- NRHP reference No.: 77000318
- CHISL No.: 298
- Added to NRHP: December 09, 1977

Empire Mine State Historic Park is a state-protected mine and park in the Sierra Nevada mountains in Grass Valley, California, U.S. The Empire Mine is on the National Register of Historic Places, a federal Historic District, and a California Historical Landmark. Begun in 1850, since 1975, California State Parks has administered and maintained the mine as a historic site. Situated in the Grass Valley Mining District, the Empire Mine is "one of the oldest, largest, deepest, longest and richest gold mines in California". Closed in 1956, it produced 5.8 million ounces (165 tons) of gold, extracted from 367 miles (591 km) of underground passages.

== History ==
In October 1850, George Roberts discovered gold in a quartz outcrop on Ophir Hill, but sold the claim in 1851 to Woodbury, Parks and Co. for $350 (or about $14,000 today, adjusted for inflation). The Woodbury Company consolidated several local claims into the Ophir Hill Mine, but they mismanaged their finances and in 1852 were forced to sell the business at auction. It was purchased by John P. Rush and the Empire Quartz Hill Co. The Empire Mining Co. was incorporated in 1854, after John Rush was bought out. As word spread that hard rock gold had been found in California, miners from the tin and copper mines of Cornwall, England, arrived to share their experience and expertise in hard rock mining. Particularly important was the Cornish contribution of the Cornish engine, operated on steam, which emptied the depths of the mine of its constant water seepage at a rate of 18,000 US gal (68,000 L; 15,000 imp gal) per day. This enabled increased productivity and expansion underground. Starting in 1895, Lester Allan Pelton's water wheel provided electric power for the mine and stamp mill. The Cornish provided the bulk of the labor force from the late 1870s until the mine's closure eighty years later.

William Bowers Bourn acquired control of the company in 1869. Bourn died in 1874, and his estate ran the mine, abandoning the Ophir vein for the Rich Hill in 1878. Bourn's son, William Bowers Bourn II, formed the Original Empire Co. in 1878, took over the assets of the Empire Mining Co., and continued work on the Ophir vein after it was bottomed out at 1,200 feet (370 m) and allowed to fill with water. With his financial backing, and after 1887, the mining knowledge and management of his younger cousin George W. Starr, the Empire Mine became famous for its mining technology. Bourn purchased the North Star Mine in 1884, turning it into a major producer, and then sold it to James Duncan Hague in 1887, along with controlling interest in the Empire a year later.

Bourn reacquired control of the Empire Mine in 1896, forming the Empire Mines and Investment Co. In 1897, he commissioned Willis Polk to design the "Cottage", using waste rock from the mine. The "Cottage" included a greenhouse, gardens, fountains and a reflecting pool. Between 1898 and 1905, a clubhouse with tennis courts, bowling alley and squash courts were built nearby.

The Empire Mine installed a cyanide plant in 1910, which was an easier gold recovery process than chlorination. In 1915, Bourn acquired the Pennsylvania Mining Co., and the Work Your Own Diggings Co., neighboring mines, which gave the Empire Mines and Investment Co. access to the Pennsylvania vein. The North Star also had some rights to that vein, but both companies compromised and made an adjustment.

In 1928, at the recommendation of Fred Searls of Nevada City, Newmont purchased the Empire Mine from Bourn. Newmont also purchased the North Star Mine, resulting in Empire-Star Mines, Ltd. The business was managed by Fred Nobs and later by Jack Mann.

Gold mines were defined as "nonessential industry to the war effort" by the War Production Board of the US Government on 8 October 1942, which shut down operations until 30 June 1945. After the war, a shortage of skilled miners forced the suspension of operations below the 4,600-foot (1,400 m) level by 1951.

By the 1950s inflation costs for gold mining were leaving the operation unprofitable. In 1956 a crippling miners' strike over falling wages ended operations. Ellsworth Bennett, a 1910 graduate of the Mackay School of Mines in Reno was the last "Cap'n" (Superintendent) of the Empire, and the only person from management allowed across the picket line (the miners' lives depended on his engineering skills and they worked as a team). Bennett oversaw the closing of the Empire on May 28, 1957, when the last Cornish water pumps were shut and removed. In its final year of operation in 1956, the Empire Mine had reached an incline depth of 11,007 ft (3,355 m).

In 1974 California State Parks purchased the Empire Mine surface property for $1.25 million ($8.16 million today), to create a state historic park. The state park now contains 853 acres (345 ha; 3.45 km^{2}; 1.333 sq mi), including forested backcountry. Newmont Mining retained the mineral rights to the Empire Mine, and 47 acres, if they decide to reopen the Empire Star Mines.

== Geology ==
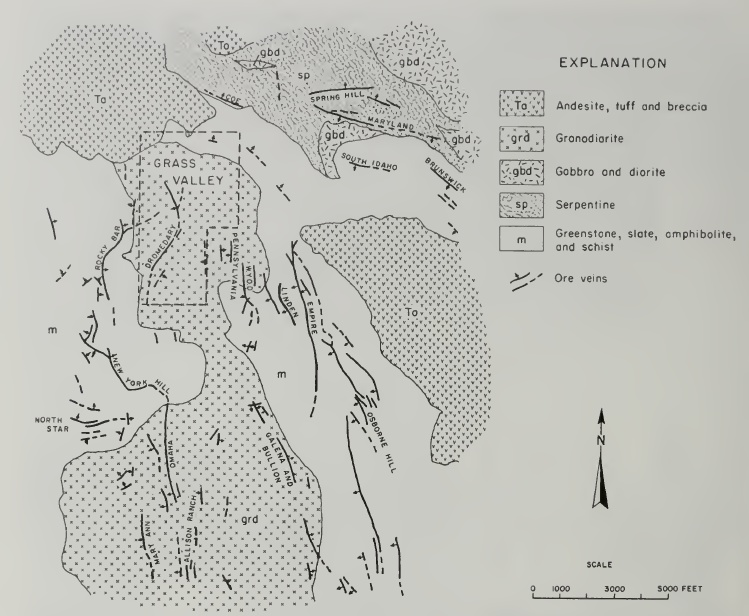
Grass Valley geologic map showing the underlying granodiorite

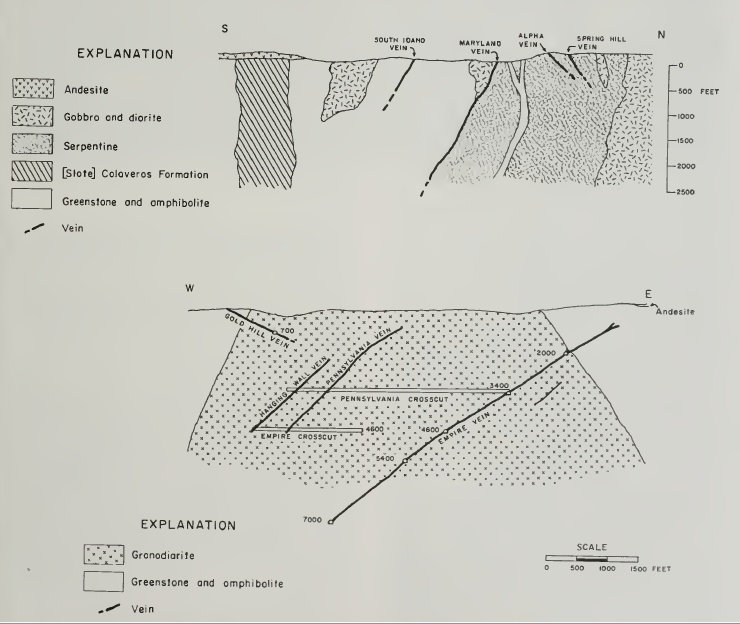
Grass Valley geologic cross section showing the Empire vein

A Granodiorite body five miles (8 km) long, north to south, and up to two miles (3.2 km) wide, underlies the district. This body intruded into surrounding metamorphic rocks. Gold ore deposits reside in the quartz veins, ranging from 3 to 7 ounces per ton. The Empire Vein outcrops to the east on a north–south strike, dipping at a 35-degree angle to the west. The vein was mined with inclined shafts following dip, with horizontal shafts (drifts) every 300–400 ft (90–120 m) along strike. The ore was mined by stoping.

== Museum ==
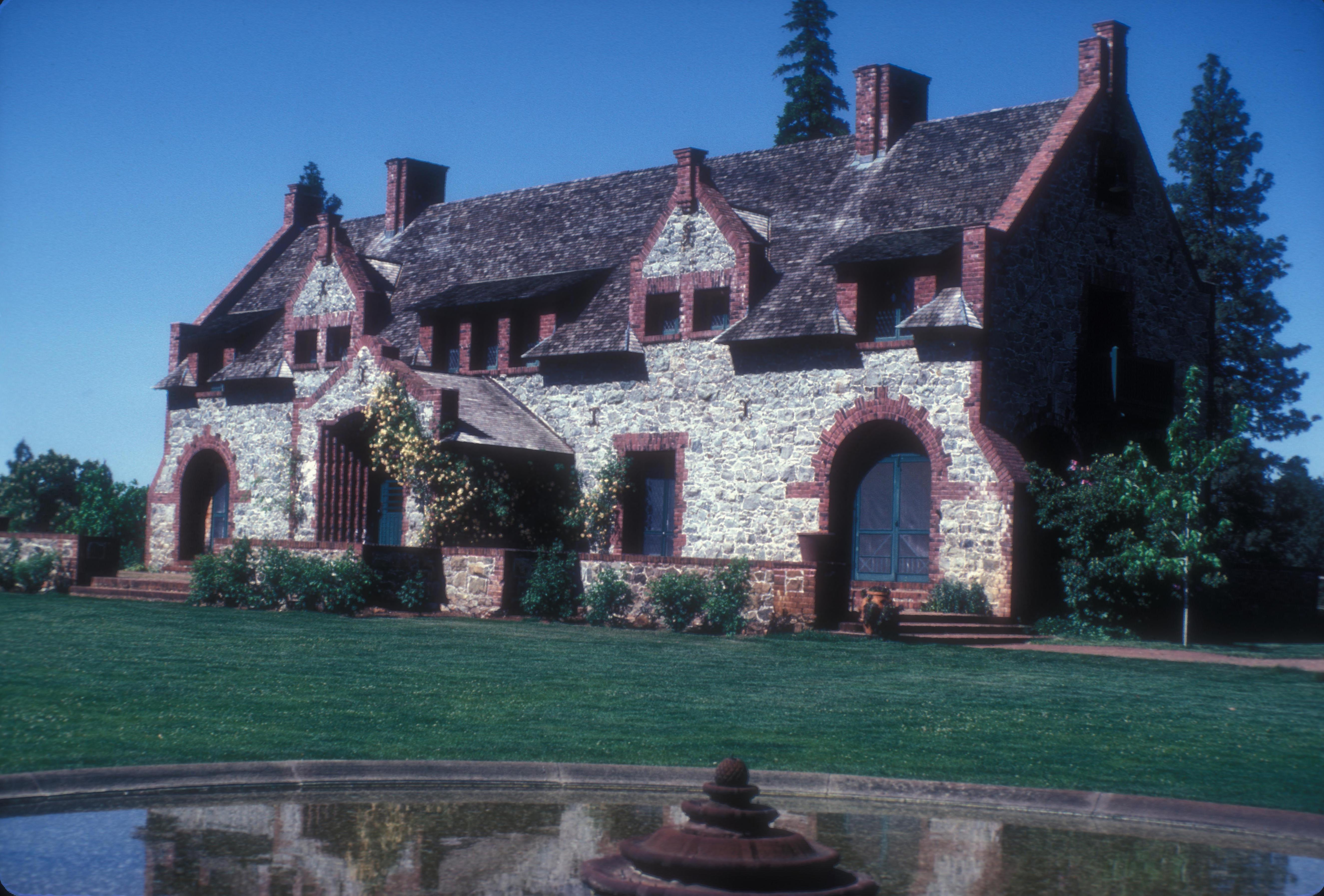
Empire Cottage was built using waste rock from the mine.

On weekends from May through October, volunteers dressed in Edwardian clothing give living history tours of the Bourn Cottage, the 1890s country estate home of William Bourn Jr., and the Mine yard, with demonstrations of mine operations.

The park's museum contains a scale model of the underground workings of the Empire/Star mine complex, exhibits of ore samples from local mines, a recreated Assay Office and a collection of minerals. There are 13 acres (5.3 ha) of gardens to tour.

The Sierra Gold Parks Foundation supports educational and interpretive programs at the park through donations, visitor center sales, memberships, and special events.

== Facilities ==
=== Visitors Center ===
Formerly the Carriage and Automobile house, the Visitors Center is situated just a few hundred feet from the main parking lot. It contains the museum, with a variety of rocks for viewing, historical photos and artifacts, and the "Secret Room", a map of the mine system. The visitors center also has a gift shop, which sells a diverse selection of Empire-Mine-themed souvenirs.

=== Mining Engineer's Office ===
After a merger with the North Star Mine in 1929, the Mining Engineer's Office was created to house staff who were tasked to plan the growth of the mine.

=== Mine Manager's Office ===
The Mine Manager's Office served as an office-space for the Mine Manager.

=== Assay Office ===
During the operation of the mine, the Assay Office was used to value the gold samples that were pulled from the mine.

=== Refinery Room ===
This room was used to cast gold nuggets into 89-pound gold bars which were then transported to the U.S. Mint in San Francisco to be sold.

=== Warehouse ===
Located just to the east of the refinery room is the Warehouse, which had been used for storage during the mine's operation.

=== Welding Shop ===
During the mine's operation, the welding shop was used to create and repair equipment used in the mine. After the mines closure in 1956, the building had been torn down, and equipment had been sold. The site of where the building was is now part of an equipment exhibit.

=== Machine Shop ===
The Machine Shop is known by visitors for its connection to the current shaft-viewing area. The machine shop housed equipment that was powered using a Pelton Water Wheel that was connected to a system of belts. Those belts had several sections, dropping down to different parts of equipment inside the Machine Shop and allowing the continuous operation of equipment.

Much of the equipment inside of the Machine Shop was listed for sale after the mine closed, but due to the complexity of the systems it was hard to find any buyers. Now, almost all of the equipment that had been used is on display. Some equipment inside still properly functions and is demonstrated during scheduled events, like the Lathe.

The Machine Shop and adjacent Carpenter's Shop had a small rail system to allow carts to move between the Machine Shop, Carpenter's Shop, and Blacksmith Shop.

=== Shaft Viewing Area ===
The Shaft Viewing Area is a modern facility built by California State Parks to allow visitors to view the entrance of the mineshaft that had started at the headframe. Inside is a small staircase, leading down to an exhibit of minecarts that had been used to transport workers.

=== Blacksmith Shop ===
The Blacksmith Shop was an essential facility of the mine, producing small mining tools like drive hooks, and structure pieces, like door handles. At some point in history, the Blacksmith Shop had been demolished.

Contrary to popular belief, the current Blacksmith Shop is a near exact replica, built by the Over-the-Hill Gang- a group of craftsmen who "tackle the tasks that our state park staff may not have the time, funds or specialized skills to accomplish."

Today, the Blacksmith Shop is one of the few active exhibits of the park, with volunteers who work during all hours of the park's operation. Members of the shop forge tools and other pieces that can be purchased by the public either in-shop or in the Gift Shop.

=== Headframe ===
The headframe of the mineshaft was a wooden structure that had been used to move ore and personnel carts up and down the mines. Today, only partially does the headframe exist, as over the last seventy years, pieces have been removed for safety purposes. A replica model of the headframe in its original state is available for viewing in the Hoist House.

=== Compressor Building ===
The compressor building was built for the purpose of providing air into the mine shafts to allow workers inside of the mine to breathe properly. Inside the building are multiple large air compressors that lead down the mineshafts. Air was also pumped for operating machinery.

=== Hoist House ===
The Hoist House was used by hoistmen to operate hoists that had the purpose of retrieving ore and personnel from the mineshafts.

=== Stamp Mill Site ===
The Stamp Mill Building was a large building that had been host to a large amount of Stamp Mills for ore processing. Today, the site and its remains have been completely destroyed and it is closed to the public.

=== Empire Clubhouse ===
The Clubhouse was built in 1905 for the purpose of entertaining guests. Today, its used to host events, such as EMSHP's annual "See Santa" event.

=== Ophir Cottage ===
The Ophir Cottage was the home of George Starr. The building no longer exists due to a fire that had burned down the building on October 28th, 1935.

=== Empire Cottage ===
The Empire Cottage is one of the most recognizable landmarks of the Empire Mine State Historic Park, and West Nevada County. Built with waste rock in 1897, it was named a cottage to distinguish the building from Bourn's other homes that he occupied. The first floor, and main floor, housed the kitchen, service rooms, living room, dining room, and a reading room which eventually was changed into a bedroom. The second floor was host to four bedrooms and two bathrooms.

=== Gardener's House and Greenhouse ===
During the mines operation, a gardener was present to keep the Empire Mine site lush. Today, nearly 1,000 bushes that have been placed on landscaped grounds around the park were cultivated in the greenhouse.

=== Cyanide Plant ===
The Cyanide plant was used during the operation period of the mine to manage the use of sodium cyanide for separating gold in crushed ore. Due to unsafe conditions, this area is not open for public viewing.

== See also ==
- North Star Mine and Powerhouse
- List of California state parks
- California Historical Landmarks in Nevada County

== Gallery ==
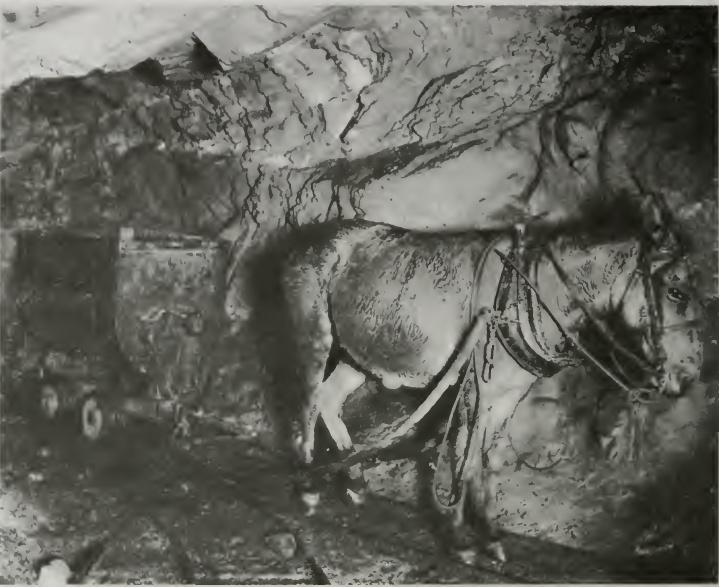
Mule hauling an ore car in 1910

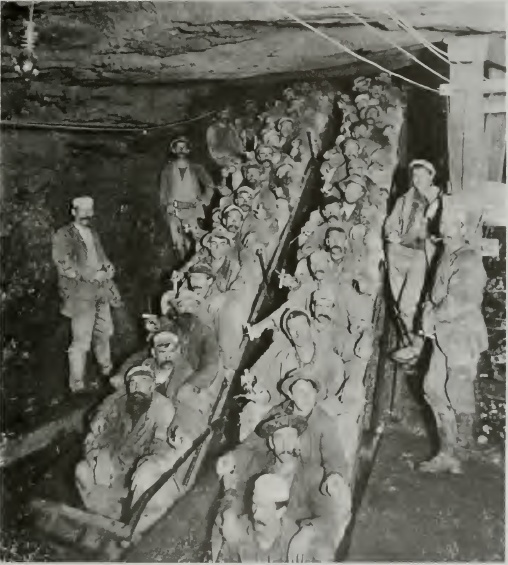
Shift change in 1900

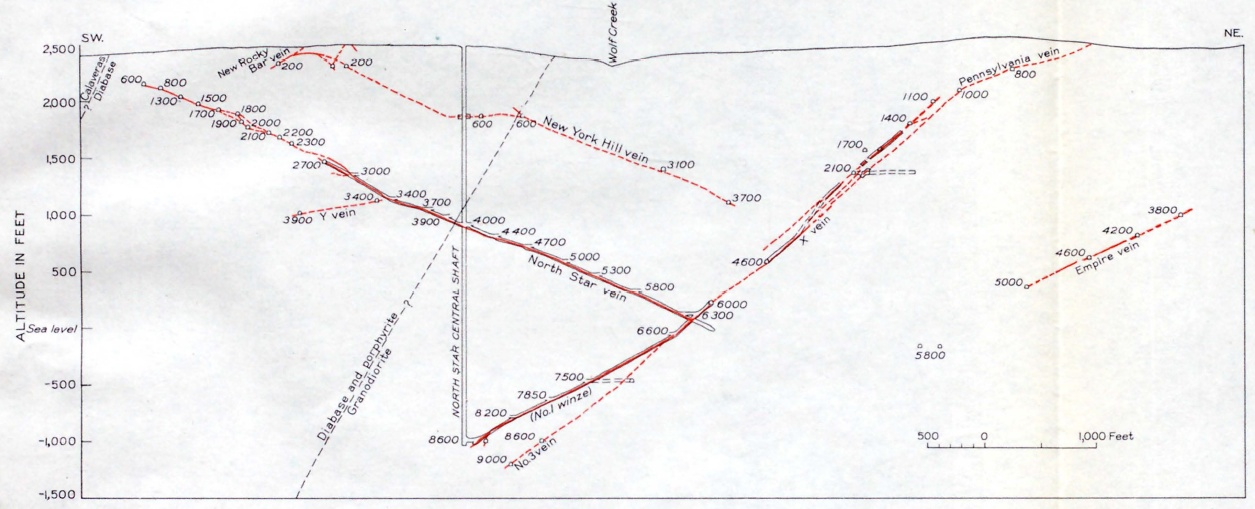
Geologic cross section showing the relationship of the Empire and North Star Veins
