= Arthur De Wint Foote =

American mining engineer (1849–1933)

Arthur de Wint Foote
- Foote in a 1922 publication
- Born: 1849; Guilford, Connecticut
- Died: 1933 (aged 83–84); Grass Valley, California
- Resting place: Foote-Ward Cemetery; Guilford, Connecticut
- Education: Yale College
- Occupations: Civil engineer; mining engineer
- Known for: Foote's Crossing Road; Foote's Crossing Road high bridge; North Star Mine Powerhouse; North Star House
- Spouse: Mary Hallock Foote
- Children: Arthur Burling Foote; Betty Foote; Agnes Foote

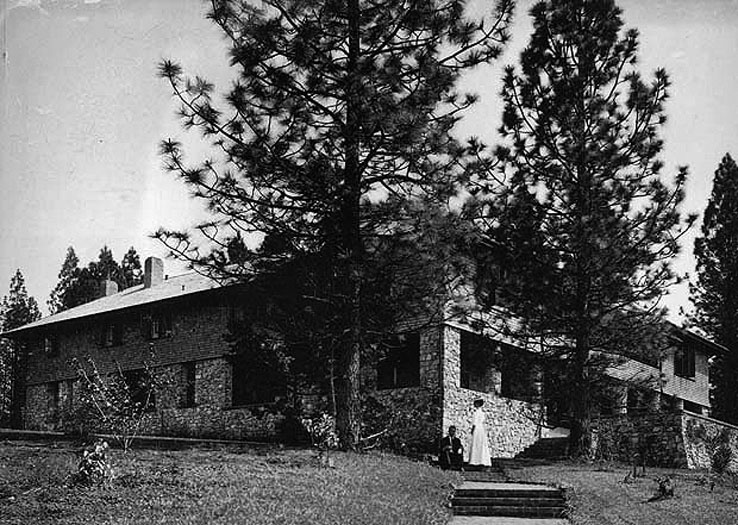
North Star House (Grass Valley, California), 1907. Photo by Arthur De Wint Foote.

Arthur De Wint Foote (1849–1933) was an American civil engineer and mining engineer who impacted the development of the American West with his innovative engineering works and entrepreneurial ventures. In Northern California in the late 1890s, he designed and built the North Star Mine Powerhouse, the highest capacity impulse-turbine power-plant of the time, and now a California historic landmark; within that plant he designed and installed the then-largest Pelton wheel turbine. Later, he designed and built Foote's Crossing, a high bridge, and Foote's Crossing Road, both now memorialized as California and U.S. landmarks.

== Early life and education ==
Born in Guilford, Connecticut, Foote's ancestry was English—from Yorkshire before 1630. After preparatory schooling as a youth, he attended Yale College's Sheffield Scientific School, but left in 1868 before graduating. From there he began his early career in business and construction ventures along the eastern seaboard of the US and in the West Indies basin.

== Career ==
In 1873, he landed in San Francisco, seeking work. In quick succession he worked on the Sutro Tunnel site in Virginia City, Nevada—where he assisted with installing the first industrial air compressor in a tunnel or mine in the U.S. West; then on the Eldorado Canal of the American River, which supplied water to new hydraulic mines near Placerville, California. Working for the Southern Pacific Railroad in 1874, he assisted the chief engineer building the Tehachapi Loop, the celebrated climbing railway spiral—and now a popular railfan site and National Historic Civil Engineering Landmark.

In 1876, while posted at the New Almaden Quicksilver Mine in Santa Clara County, California, young Foote returned East to marry and to bring his bride, Mary Hallock Foote, back to California. Soon he moved his family to Deadwood, South Dakota, where he helped supervise the Homestake Mine; then to Leadville, Colorado, during the Colorado Silver Boom. There he served as a (litigation) mining expert for the Iron Silver Mining Company. Later he supervised the Adelaide Mine and other small mines near Leadville.

Abandoning the high altitudes for health reasons, Foote journeyed to Morelia in Michoacán, Mexico, to prospect a retired silver mine; then to Wood River Valley in south-central Idaho—locale of today's Sun Valley ski resort—to open the Wolftone Mine prospect. Later, he formed a partnership venture and bought water rights on the Boise River where he designed the Boise River irrigation project, then developed it for ten years before it eventually failed for lack of capital. The project became known as the New York Canal. (Ultimately it was completed by the federal government, i.e., the U.S. Bureau of Reclamation, as the Arrowrock Dam project (1915), then the largest arid-lands irrigation scheme in the United States.) Foote's Idaho home was built of lava rock and used his own cement formula; the site (43.524°N 116.063°W) is near the outlet of the Lucky Peak Dam (1955).

After Boise, Foote served as a hydrologist for the newly created U.S. Geological Survey, leading field surveys that documented the hydrology and hydraulics of reaches of the Snake River and Snake River Plain and valley. He returned briefly to Mexico to engineer roads in Baja California for an onyx mine; then 'made home' again to California to manage the Fremont Mine in Amador City, just east of Sacramento.

=== Grass Valley, California ===
In 1895, Foote settled his family in Grass Valley, California—some fifty miles (80 km) west of Lake Tahoe—where he was hired to design an electric-generating plant for the North Star Mine, the second largest gold producing mine in California. After studying the site he judged that electric power was neither safe nor dependable for operating the underground works there; instead he conceived a master plan for using air compressors to operate the mine—and using hydro-impulse turbines to power the compressors.

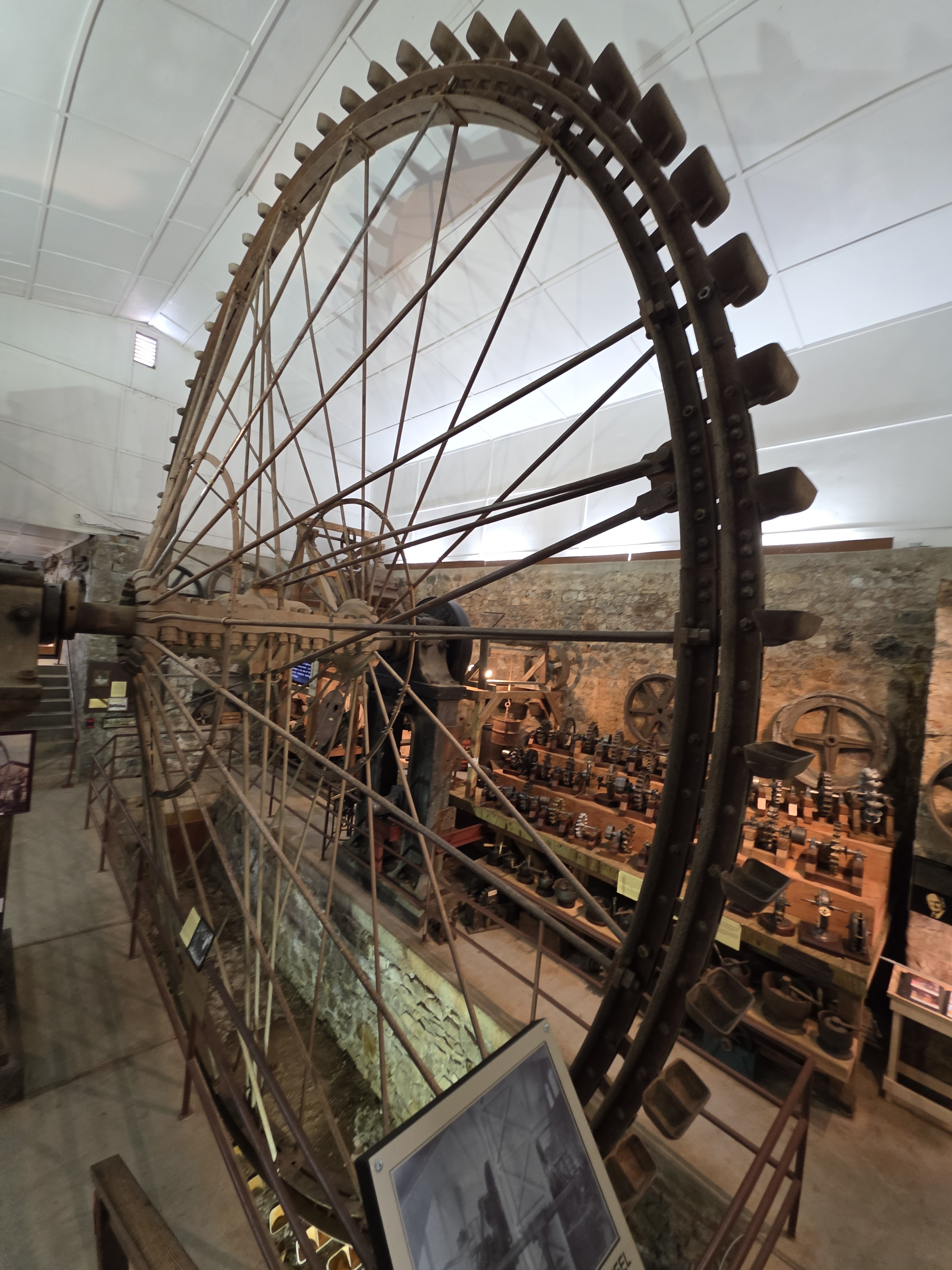
Thirty foot diameter Pelton wheel designed by Foote

Now he envisioned a power plant housing an over-sized Pelton water wheel—the recently invented hydro-powered impulse turbine. At 30 feet (9 m) in diameter, he designed and erected a drum wheel more than sixty percent larger than the maximum recommended by the Pelton Water Wheel Company in San Francisco. Upon completion, 'Foote's Pelton wheel' performed successfully as the world's largest operating impulse turbine wheel; it was in continuous use for over 30 years. In 1991, Foote's North Star Mine Powerhouse was designated an International Historic Mechanical Engineering Landmark.

Foote advanced to superintendent and later to general manager of the North Star Mine. Then he and his wife commissioned the design of North Star House by the architect Julia Morgan. The grand residence was built in 1905 in Grass Valley. Also known as Foote Mansion, the house is notable for its iconic 'western' elegance, and for its association with the careers of three singular 'westerners': the engineer-miner-entrepreneur Arthur Foote, his wife the author-illustrator Mary Hallock Foote, and the master architect Morgan. Later, the author Wallace Stegner made Foote Mansion the setting for his Pulitzer Prize-winning novel Angle of Repose (1972), which closely referenced the lives of the Footes. Members of the Foote family occupied the North Star House as home until 1968. The House is listed on national and state registers of historic places; and the landscape-site, including gardens and orchard, has been designated as a local historic landmark.

While at North Star Mine in 1911, Foote and several partners purchased the Tightner Mine in Alleghany, California. Now Foote designed and constructed a high bridge over the Middle Yuba River and a 22-mile (35 km) high grade mountain road connecting the two mines. Subsequently, the project — consisting of the Foote's Crossing Road and the Foote's Crossing Road high bridge — was memorialized as a National Register of Historic Places landmark and as a California Point of Historical Interest(No. P401).

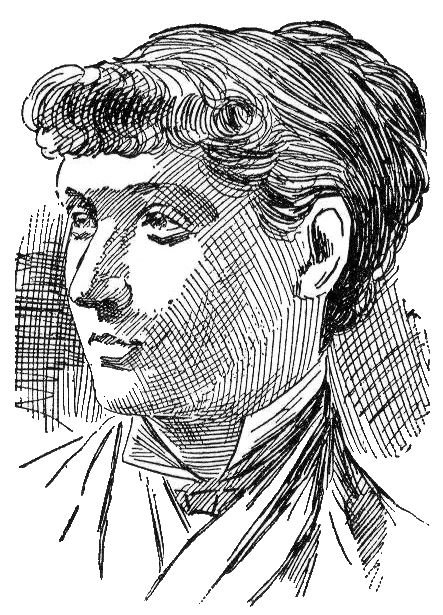
Mary Hallock Foote

Arthur and Mary Foote served ambassadorial roles of representing the 'new' West and the lifestyles to be had there. They frequently received dignitaries and celebrities touring the West and hosted them for extended stays at North Star House; they hosted community and civic events there. He contributed technical papers to professional societies and published scholarly articles addressing public issues, especially re developing the West. He advocated high standards of literacy, both professional and personal, for engineers.

== Personal life and controversy ==
In 1876, Foote married the illustrator and writer Mary Hallock Foote (1847–1938) in her hometown of Milton, Ulster County, New York. Their marriage produced a son, Arthur Burling Foote (1877–1964), who followed closely after his father's career footsteps, and two daughters, Betty (1882–1942) and Agnes (1886–1904). Foote died Thursday, August 24, 1933, at the home of his daughter after suffering a stroke two days earlier.

Arthur Foote's biography was written by his wife within her memoirs—which were collected by Rodman Paul and published in 1972 as A Victorian Gentlewoman in the Far West. Mary Hallock Foote, in her own right, was an important literary and pioneer figure in the history of the old West.

In creating his Pulitzer Prize-winning novel Angle of Repose (1972), the twentieth century novelist Wallace Stegner appropriated—with permission—portions of Arthur and Mary Foote's life stories from her memoirs (noted above). Stegner used passages taken directly from Mary Foote's actual letters and recast them as fictionalized correspondence of the novel's main character; his choices resulted in controversy within the literary community that continues today.

== Selected works ==
- A water-meter for irrigation. N.Y.: American Society of Civil Engineers. 1887. ISBN 9781101872765. OCLC 81383310.
- Foote, A. D. (1891). The forestry problem of the arid region. ISBN 9781101872765. OCLC 82976679.
- A water power and compressed air transmission plant for the North Star Mining Company, Grass Valley, Cal. Transactions. American Society of Civil Engineers. 1896. ISBN 9781101872765. OCLC 27648778.
- Foote, A. D. (1910). "The redemption of the great valley of California". Transactions of the American Society of Civil Engineers. 66 (1). ASIN B0008A0FD4.
