= Mary Hallock Foote =

American novelist

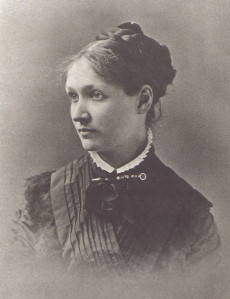
- Mary Hallock Foote (c.1874)
- Born: November 9, 1847; Milton, New York
- Died: June 25, 1938 (aged 90); Hingham, Massachusetts
- Education: Cooper Institute School of Design for Women
- Occupations: Writer, Illustrator
- Spouse: Arthur De Wint Foote (m. 1876)

Mary Hallock Foote (November 9, 1847 – June 25, 1938) was an American author and illustrator. She is best known for her illustrated short stories and novels portraying life in the mining communities of the turn-of-the-century American West.

== Biography ==
=== Overview ===
Mary Haviland Hallock was born November 9, 1847, in Milton, New York, of English Quaker ancestry. A singular girl and youth, she attended the Female Collegiate Seminary in Poughkeepsie, New York, then studied art in New York City at the new Cooper Institute School of Design for Women. By her early twenties she had become established in New York City as an accomplished artist-illustrator for notable publishers there.

In 1876 Hallock married a young mining engineer, Arthur De Wint Foote, then moved cross-continent to live with him at the New Almaden mine near San Jose, California. Subsequently, as Arthur pursued his engineering career, she followed him throughout the West: to Leadville, Colorado; to Deadwood, South Dakota; then to Boise, Idaho, where Arthur originated a major irrigation project on the Boise River; then to Morelia, Michoacán, Mexico; and finally to Grass Valley, California, where Arthur advanced to managing the North Star mine, and retired there.

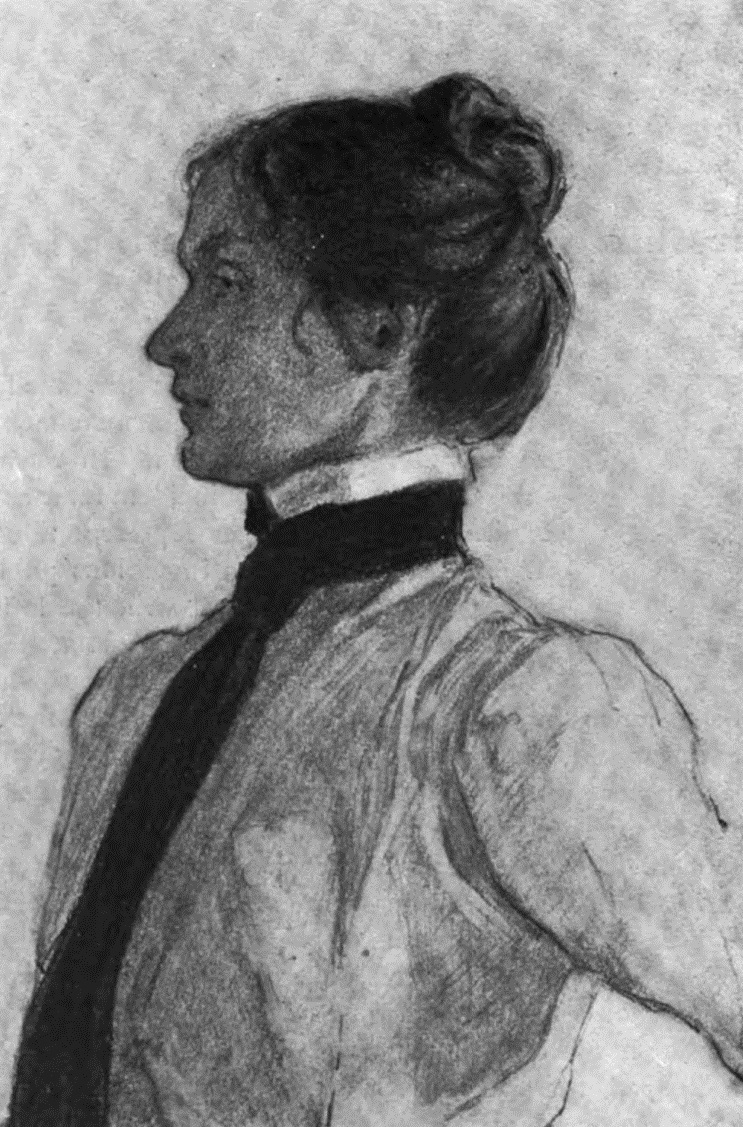
Portrait sketch of Mary Hallock Foote, by her daughter, Elisabeth Foote

Arthur and Mary Foote were married nearly sixty years. In the early years of their marriage she gave birth to three children: a son, Arthur Burling Foote, and two daughters, Betty and Agnes.

=== Career ===
As a student Mary Hallock Foote befriended American artist Helena de Kay Gilder. The two maintained a very close friendship throughout their lives, shared a lengthy correspondence via letter, and used each other for critiquing their work. Mary Hallock Foote also benefitted from Gilder's husband Richard Watson Gilder, who commissioned her art while he was an editor for Scribner's Monthly. It was through the Gilders that Mary Hallock Foote was also introduced to a circle of fellow artists including, Mary L. Stone, Mary Birney, Maria Oakey, and several popular writers.

After departing her beloved East with great reluctance, Mary Hallock Foote found herself inspired by the "real West" country and the varying peoples she encountered there. She soon was drawing it, and writing and telling about it. Recording her travels, Foote wrote stories for 'back-East' readers as a correspondent to The Century Magazine and other periodicals, illustrating them with wood engravings made from her drawings. She wrote several novels and is best known for her stories of place, in which she portrayed the rough, picturesque life she experienced and observed in the old West, especially that in the early mining towns.

She was one of America's best-known women illustrators in the 1870s and 1880s. She illustrated stories and novels by other authors including Nathaniel Hawthorne, Henry Wadsworth Longfellow, Louisa May Alcott, Bret Harte, and others. Foote exhibited her work at The Woman's Building at the 1893 World's Columbian Exposition in Chicago, Illinois.

Mary Foote gained renown as a hostess to dignitaries and celebrities traveling through the environs of her homesteads in the West. After 1905, when she and her husband built North Star House (also known as Foote Mansion) and made permanent settlement in Grass Valley, California, she presided for some 30 years over many historic social and civic events there.

After her death, Foote fell into obscurity. Thirty-four years after her death, historian Rodman Paul's 1972 edition of Foote's unpublished memoir, A Victorian Gentlewoman in the Far West, helped to spur renewed interest in her life and work. However, her letters—which provide what amounts to a biography of her husband as well as her own autobiography—have never been published except as brief excerpts in various areas of research.

=== Death and legacy ===
Mary Hallock Foote died June 25, 1938, at age 90. Her legacy in American history is as a stalwart of the American Old West and a teller of its stories. Her work—the numerous stories for books and periodicals, with her drawings and woodcut illustrations; the correspondence from western outposts; her novels and nonfiction—gained her notice as a skilled observer of the frontier and an accomplished writer. Her life expressed the civilizing influence of the educated eastern gentlewoman on life in the chaotic mining and "ditch" camps (irrigation-project construction camps) of the early American West and, conversely, the stimulating effect of those "old West" environs on the prepared mind, that is, one educated for illustrating and telling the story.

=== Controversy ===
Wallace Stegner's novel Angle of Repose (Pulitzer Prize, 1972) is based directly upon Mary Hallock Foote's extensive personal correspondence. Stegner used the outline of her life ostensibly with permission from members of Foote's family—on proviso that he disguise the source, which, in his judgment, he did. After publication, however, some descendants objected to "the great liberties" taken by Stegner in using Foote's story. On the opposite hand, Stegner used passages taken directly from Foote's letters and her reminiscences without providing specific credit; this resulted in controversy that still today haunts his reputation within the literary community.

== Selected works ==
- A California Mining Camp (1878)
- A Sea-Port on the Pacific (1878)
- A Diligence Journey in Mexico (1881)
- From Morelia to Mexico City on Horseback (1882)
- Led-Horse Claim: A Romance of a Mining Camp (1883)
- The Last Assembly Ball (1889)
- Coeur d'Alene (1894)
- In Exile and Other Stories (1894)
- The Borrowed Shift (1898)
- How the Pump Stopped at Morning Watch (1899)
- Pilgrims to Mecca (1899)
- The Little Fig-Tree Stories (1899)
- The Prodigal (1900)
- The Desert and the Sown (1902)
- The Desert and the Town (1902)
- A Touch of Sun and Other Stories (1903)
- The Eleventh Hour (1906)
- Royal Americans (1910)
- The Valley Road (1915)
- The Ground Swell (1919)
- A Victorian Gentlewoman in the Far West The Reminiscences of Mary Hallock Foote, edited by Rodman W. Paul, ISBN 0-87328-057-1 (1972)
- The Idaho Stories and Far-West Illustrations of Mary Hallock Foote, edited by Barbara Cragg, Dennis M. Walsh, and Mary Ellen Walsh. (1988)
