= North Star House (Grass Valley, California) =

Historic house in California, United States

- U.S. National Register of Historic Places
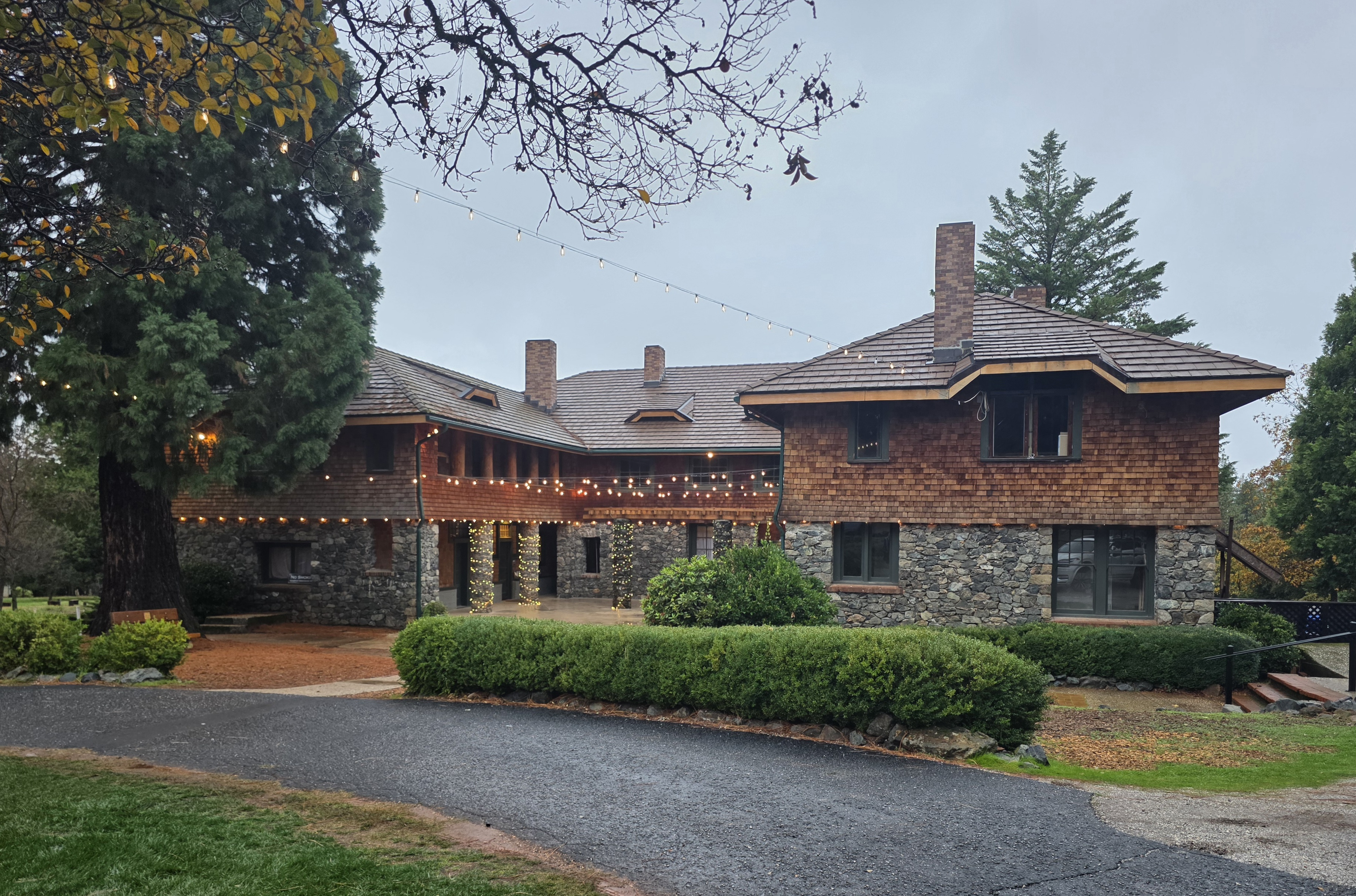
- The North Star House in 2025

- Location within California Location within the United States
- Location: 12075 Old Auburn Rd., Grass Valley, Nevada County, California.
- Coordinates: 39°11′40″N 121°4′35″W
- Built: 1905
- Architect: Julia Morgan
- Architectural style: California Arts and Crafts, First Bay Tradition
- NRHP reference No.: 10001191
- Added to NRHP: February 1, 2011

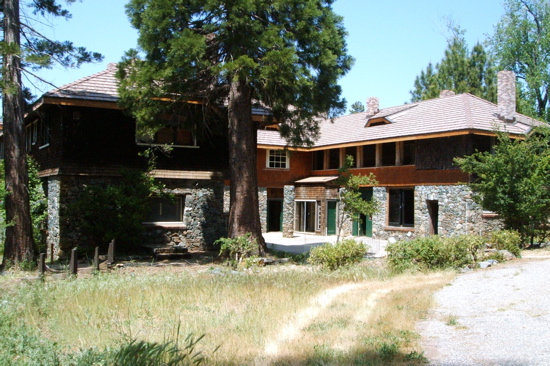
The North Star House in 2008

North Star House (alternate: Foote Mansion) is a mansion located roughly a mile south of Grass Valley, Nevada County, northern California. In 1904, James Hague, president of the North Star Mine, commissioned Julia Morgan, a newly licensed California architect, to design the 11,000 square foot building. The house served as a residence for mine superintendent Arthur DeWint Foote and his wife, Mary Hallock Foote, a noted author and illustrator, as well as to impress visiting investors from the East Coast. It was Morgan's first significant commission after receiving her license.

From the 2025 amended nomination: The nomination to the National Register of Historic Places was amended to document national level of significance under Criterion B in the areas of Literature, Social History: Civil Rights, and Social History: Women’s History with an expanded discussion of Mary Hallock Foote’s importance and influence. At the national level of significance under Criterion C in the area of Architecture, the nomination was also amended to document Julia Morgan’s association with design and construction of 127 Hostess Houses on military camps during World War I, for which North Star House is perceived as the prototype. The property remains eligible at the local level of significance under Criterion A in the area of Industry.

Julia Morgan was brought in by the YWCA in WWI to be the lead architect and construction supervisor for 127 Hostess Houses on 32 nationwide training camps. Under an agreement with the War Department, the houses provided a place for almost 5 million men and their loved ones to meet for a day, enjoy a meal, and say their final goodbyes before shipping out. Not small operations: many of the houses saw upwards of 1700 visitors a day. The perceived prototype was North Star House. The similarities can be immediately seen in the architectural designs and details, including large windows, wide porches, exposed posts and beams, paneling, multi-functional designs and use of local materials. In many camps, black servicemen suffered under horrific racism: not enough toilets, having to hike to creeks to bathe and not allowed in mess tents for meals. 17 black commanders requested a hostess house. Because of Morgan, they were identical to the white hostess houses. Civil Rights historians point to the good and bad of WWI as the roots of the Civil Rights movement of the 50s and 60s.

Mary Hallock Foote wrote two significant novels in her office at North Star House, following the birth of four granddaughters. It was the era of the New Woman and Foote had lived that life. She knew it intimately and she wrote with a renewed passion. The novels were totally different from anything she had previously written. The Valley Road encouraged young women to postpone marriage, go to college, graduate, have a career, and then marry the man she loved. This was unheard of at that time period when women married the men their parents chose and college and careers were reserved for men. The novel had 5 reprintings and was a bestseller. The second novel, Ground-Swell, was one of the first novels about lesbians -- go to college, graduate, have a career and be with the woman you love. The literary critics had a field day with both books, wondering about these "western women" who stood up to men, had a voice and opinions, and talked about their (female) husbands.

== Geography ==
The house is located at 12075 Old Auburn Road, near the Nevada County Fairgrounds. Situated on a 14-acre (5.7 ha) site, the property is on a hillside that overlooks foothills and the valley.

== History ==
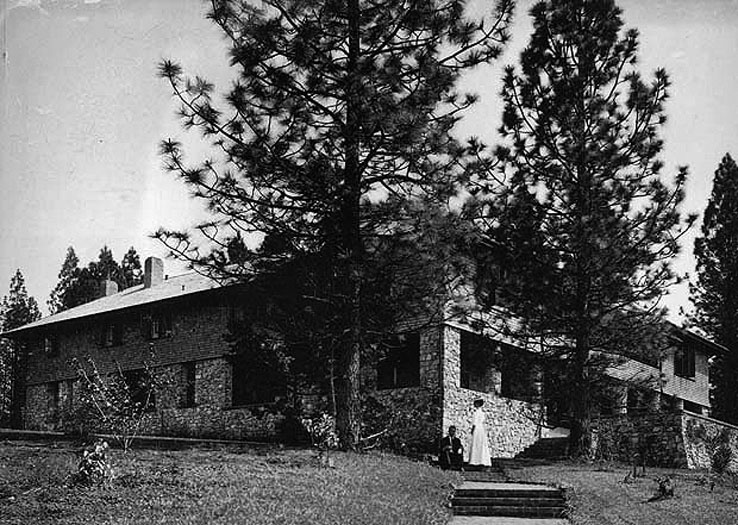
North Star House, 1907

While the California Gold Rush is considered to fall between 1848 and 1859, gold mining was still important to the state. James Hague, a well known and respected mining consultant, decided he wanted to purchase a mine and narrowed his search to Grass Valley, where he purchased the North Star Mine from William Bourne, who owned both the Empire and North Star Mines. North Star Mine became one of the top producing mines in California following A.D. Foote's design and installation of the then-largest Pelton wheel turbine. The success of the mine convinced Hague of the need for a mansion. Hague had seen Morgan's work at U.C. Berkeley where she was employed as a draftsperson for San Francisco architect John Galen Howard, who was supervising the University of California Master Plan.

Designed in 1904, it Morgan's first major commission after receiving her license in March 1904. In 1929, with the mine closure, son A.B. Foote and his wife, Jeannette Hooper Foote, purchased the house and about 170 surrounding acres. The Foote family resided there until 1968 when it was sold to a renegade preacher known as Rev. Bill and used as a boarding school for at risk youth and made alterations to the house. By the late 70s, rumors circulated about unorthodox dealings with the youth at the school. To some locals, the site became known as the Devils' Mansion. The school failed and closed; Rev. Bill was not heard of again.

The house was then abandoned to the elements, the homeless and partying teens and failing. From the mid-1980s until April 2002, it was owned by Terra Alta Development. In November 2002, Sandy Sanderson, an Oregon developer, obtained a binding contract on the property and deeded the house and surrounding 14 acres to the Nevada County Land Trust. A grant from Nevada County, funded by the Dryden-Wilson Bequest Fund, repaired the roof that was threatening to collapse. In 2006, the North Star Historic Conservancy was formed and restoration continued with volunteers and community support. The first floor is almost finished and, in 2025, work has begun on the second floor. The landscape is also under restoration; the Heritage Garden is the highlight. The house is currently being used as an event and cultural center.

== Architecture and fittings ==
The 11,000-square-foot (1,000 m^{2}) mansion, with 22 rooms, is usually noted as an early example of the California First Bay Tradition: Arts and Crafts style, but California American Institute of Architects found that North Star House has three early exemplars of Julia Morgan's designs: (a) Blended architecture in which Morgan incorporated Classical European, First Bay Tradition: Arts and Crafts, and California Hacienda, (b) re-enforced concrete, and (c) multi-functional design, in which intimate conversations can take place in the midst of a large gathering. The last was a design feature that few architects mastered. First Bay Tradition: Arts and Crafts dominated the building of the mansion: with primary local material milled or mined on the property. These included tailings (waste rock) from the mine, hand-peeled logs, fir floors and cedar shingles, siding and paneling. Exemplifying Morgan's style, the house features exposed beams, strong horizontal lines, the use of shingles, and earth-toned colors.

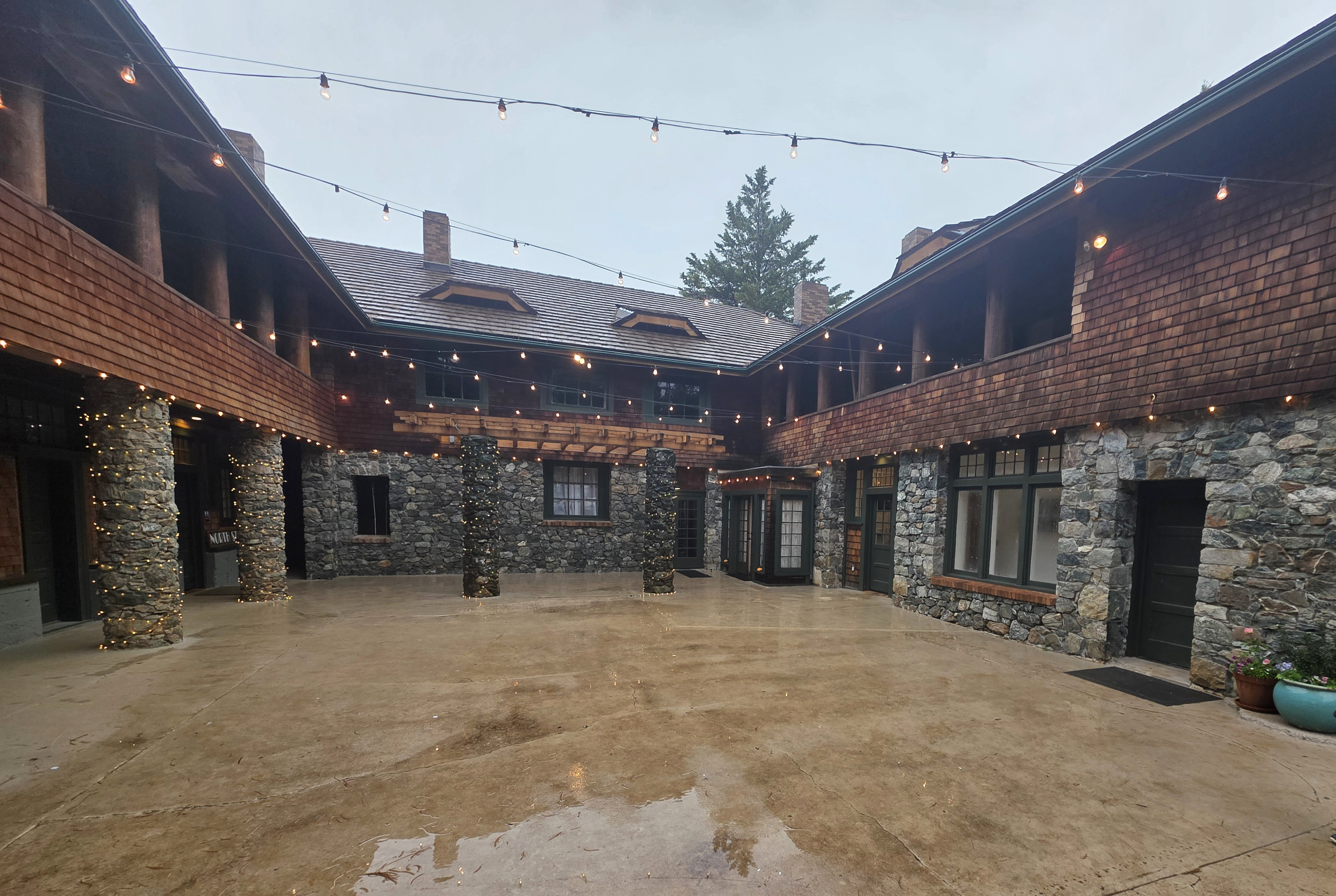
North Star House entry courtyard in 2025

North Star House derives its aesthetic from its imposing massing and materials, which are simply expressed. The wood frame building features exterior stone masonry walls at the first level and cedar shingle cladding at the second level. The stone walls are of rough quarried mine rock salvaged from the immediately adjacent North Star Mine. The low pitch gable roof has wide overhangs that shield the shingle clad walls below. Eyebrow vents break the roofline in several locations, as do a number of brick chimneys, which are in-kind replacements to the originals. The roof was originally cedar shingle, replaced in 2004 with fireproof concrete shingles that replicate wood because of severe disrepair of the original as well as fireproofing concerns. Although some of the building’s original materials have been removed and replaced due to deterioration, the building retains all aspects of historic integrity.

The building is oriented west and u-shaped in plan. An entry courtyard is situated on the east side, while a sprawling stone terrace is on the west side. There are several entry doors which access the living room, library, study, and dining room, re-enforcing the integration with the outdoors and nature. Original features, such as doorknobs and light fixtures, are no longer on the property. On the second level, an open air sleeping porch is situated above the terrace.

A courtyard is situated between the building's two wings. A small garage, which was added at the northeast corner of the building ca. 1968, has been removed.

== Landscape ==
A.D. Foote was both an engineer and horticulturist and his visions took root in the Edwardian landscape that surrounded the house. He and his friend, Luther Burbank, shared insights as well as competitions. According to Foote’s great granddaughter, the two competed to see who would be first to propagate a seedless plum, but the closest either got was a plum with hundreds of small pits.

The house was surrounded by vast lawns that were bordered by dense Washington hawthorn hedges. To the north of the house was an orchard with persimmons, quince, hazelnuts and cherries. Remnants of the orchard still stand today. To the south was a vast vegetable garden, where the miners’ families were invited to both plant and harvest. Between what was the vegetable garden and the house is the new Heritage Garden that blooms year-round with specimens from the Foote era.

Of special note was the formal rose garden that, according to his grandchildren, became Foote’s sanctuary. While once overflowing with a variety of roses, today only a few of the original rose bushes can be found.

Historic photos provided by the Foote family and now at North Star House show that original views from the house and terrace once reached the Buttes, but oaks and ponderosa pines have grown, providing privacy but obstructing all but magnificent sunset views.

== See also ==
- List of works by Julia Morgan
- National Register of Historic Places listings in Nevada County, California
