= Eleanor Hague =

American folklorist

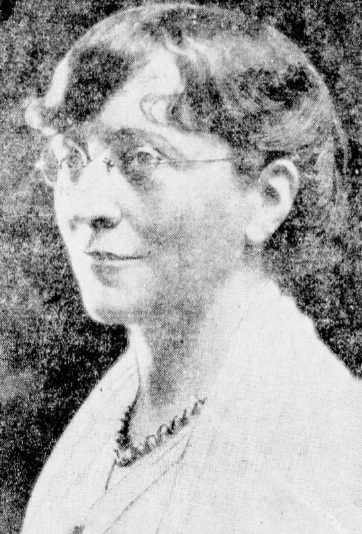
- Eleanor Hague, from a 1920 newspaper
- Born: October 7, 1875; San Francisco, California
- Died: December 25, 1954 (aged 79); Flintridge, California
- Occupation(s): Folklorist, musicologist, antiquarian
- Parent(s): James Duncan Hague and Mary Ward Foote Hague
- Relatives: Arthur De Wint Foote (uncle); Kate Foote Coe (aunt); Margaret Foote Hawley (cousin)

Eleanor Hague (October 7, 1875 – December 25, 1954) was an American folklorist and musicologist, who specialized in the traditional music of Latin America.

== Early life and education ==
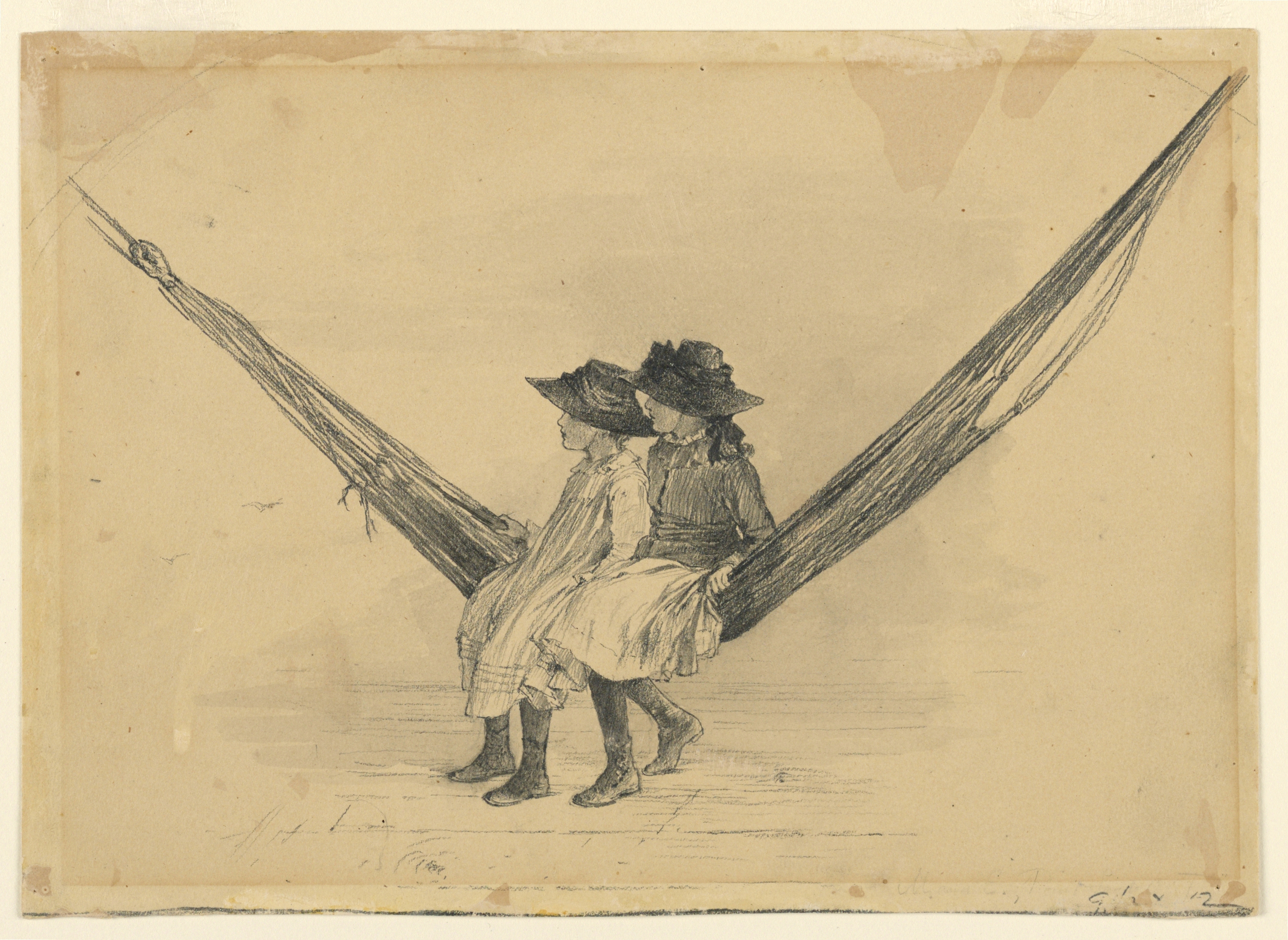
"Mary and Eleanor Hague in a Hammock" (1883), drawing by their aunt, Mary Hallock Foote

Hague was born in San Francisco, California, the daughter of geologist and mining engineer James Duncan Hague and Mary Ward Foote Hague. Through the Foote family, she was related to the Beechers and to many other prominent New England families. Writer Kate Foote Coe was her aunt; her uncle Arthur De Wint Foote was a noted engineer, and husband of book illustrator Mary Hallock Foote. Another aunt married politician Joseph Roswell Hawley; his daughter, her first cousin Margaret Foote Hawley, was an artist.

Hague studied music in New York and Massachusetts, and abroad in France and Italy.

== Career ==
As a young woman in New York, Hague was a member of the New York Oratorio Society, and was a church choir director.

Hague collected, preserved, and published folk songs from Latin America and Spanish California. She was credited as arranger on a 1925 Victor recording of "Carmela" by Dusolina Giannini. She is best known for discovering the bound manuscript notebooks of Joseph María García, an eighteenth-century Mexican dance master, who made shorthand notations about how to perform specific dance steps. She also translated folksongs from Spanish to English, working with Luisa Espinel, Juan Bautista Rael, and Marion Leffingwell. She sometimes performed the songs she collected, singing and playing piano or guitar.

In 1932, Hague lectured on early Spanish music at the Los Angeles Public Library. In the 1930s, she funded studies of Native American music, including composer Harry Partch's transcription of Charles Fletcher Lummis's wax cylinder recordings, and Frances Densmore's anthropological work.

Hague founded the Jarabe Club at a settlement house in Pasadena, California, to teach Mexican traditional music and dance to young people, and she directed the students' performances. In 1941, she directed the Jarabe Club dancers when they performed in the National Folk Festival in Washington, D.C.

== Publications ==
- "Mexican Folk-Songs" (1912)
- "Brazilian Songs" (1912)
- Folk songs from Mexico and South America (1914, with Edward Kilenyi)
- "Spanish Songs from Southern California" (1914)
- "Eskimo Songs" (1915)
- "Five Mexican Dances" (1915)
- "Five Danzas from Mexico" (1915)
- Spanish-American Folk Songs (1917)
- Early Spanish-Californian folk-songs (1922, with Gertrude Ross)
- Latin-American Music Past and Present (1934)
- "Regional Music of Spain and Latin America" (1943)

== Personal life and legacy ==
Hague died in 1954, at the age of 79, in Flintridge, California. She left her papers to the Southwest Museum, including the Joseph María García manuscript. In 1996, the Children of the Hague Manuscript, an ensemble of young musicians in Atascadero, California, performed music based on the Joseph María García notes at several concerts.
