= List of Kappa Delta chapters =

Kappa Delta is a sorority with 170 collegiate chapters across North America. In the following list, active chapters are indicated in bold and inactive chapters and institutions are in italics.

Chapter	Charter date and range	Institution	City	State or district	Status	Ref.
**Alpha**	October 23, 1897 – 1912; April 9, 1949	Longwood University	Farmville	Virginia	Active	(Note: The chapter was established at the State Female Normal School, which became Longwood. After going dormant, the chapter reformed from Gamma Theta (local), established in 1911.) (Note: This chapter was closed because the school was not ranked as a college when Kappa Delta joined the Panhellenic Council in 1912.)
Beta	1902–1904	Chatham Episcopal Institute (now Chatham Hall)	Chatham	Virginia	Inactive	(Note: Chapter closed because the school abolished fraternities.)
Gamma	1902–1929	Hollins College	Hollins	Virginia	Inactive	(Note: Chapter formed from Kappa Alpha Epsilon (local), established in 1902.)
Sigma	1902–1912	Gunston Hall School	Washington, D.C.	District of Columbia	Inactive	
Theta	1903–1960	Randolph College	Lynchburg	Virginia	Inactive	
Old Epsilon	1903–1904	Elizabeth College	Charlotte	North Carolina	Inactive	
Phi Psi	1903–1912	Fairmont Seminary	Washington, D.C.	District of Columbia	Inactive	(Note: Chapter formed from Mu Phi Psi (local), established in 1903.) (Note: This school name was variously reported as "Fairmount" or "Fairmont" in Kappa Delta sources. However, Fairmont was the actual name of the institution.)
**Zeta**	March 12, 1904	University of Alabama	Tuscaloosa	Alabama	Active	
Phi Delta	1904–1910	Saint Mary's School	Raleigh	North Carolina	Inactive	(Note: Chapter formed from Phi Delta (local), established in 1904.)
**Kappa Alpha**	November 11, 1904	Florida State University	Tallahassee	Florida	Active	
Rho Omega Phi	1904–1919	Judson College	Marion	Alabama	Inactive	(Note: Chapter formed from Rho Omega Phi (local), established in 1882.)
Delta	1905–1910	Presbyterian College for Women	Charlotte	North Carolina	Inactive	(Note: Chapter closed when the college merged into Queens College, now Queens University of Charlotte, in 1912.)
Iota (First)	June 2, 1907 – 1908	Caldwell College	Danville	Kentucky	Inactive	
**Lambda**	December 14, 1907 – 1982; 1985	Northwestern University	Evanston	Illinois	Active	(Note: Chapter formed from Lambda (local), established in 1907.)
**Omicron**	March 28, 1908	Illinois Wesleyan University	Bloomington	Illinois	Active	(Note: Chapter formed from Alpha Phi Epsilon (local), established in 1907.)
**Sigma Sigma**	April 11, 1908	Iowa State University	Ames	Iowa	Active	(Note: Chapter formed from the S.S. Society, established in 1900.)
**Epsilon**	February 4, 1909	Louisiana State University	Baton Rouge	Louisiana	Active	
**Epsilon Omega**	December 17, 1910	University of Kentucky	Lexington	Kentucky	Active	(Note: Chapter formed from Epsilon Omega Delta (local), established in 1903.)
Alpha Gamma	1911–1966	Coe College	Cedar Rapids	Iowa	Inactive	(Note: Chapter formed from Alpha Gamma (local), established in 1911.)
Sigma Delta	1912–1967, 1976–1990	Duke University	Durham	North Carolina	Inactive	(Note: Chapter formed from Sigma Delta (local), established in 1904.)
Kappa	1913–1914	Women's College of Alabama	Montgomery	Alabama	Inactive	(Note: Chapter formed from Kappa Lambda (local), established in 1911.)
**Omega Xi**	January 25, 1913 – 1988, 1991	University of Cincinnati	Cincinnati	Ohio	Active	(Note: Chapter formed from Omega Xi (local), established in 1910.)
Eta	1913–1964	Hunter College	New York City	New York	Inactive	(Note: Chapter formed from Eta Pi (local), established in 1907.)
Chi	1914–1974	University of Denver	Denver	Colorado	Inactive	(Note: Chapter formed from Lambda Sigma (local), established in 1913.)
Rho	1914–1986	University of Wyoming	Laramie	Wyoming	Inactive	(Note: Chapter formed from Sigma Rho (local), established in 1913.)
**Mu**	September 25, 1914	Millsaps College	Jackson	Mississippi	Active	(Note: Chapter formed from Kappa Mu (local), established in 1906.)
Phi Tau	1915–1970	Bucknell University	Lewisburg	Pennsylvania	Inactive	(Note: Chapter formed from Phi Epsilon Tau (local), established in 1915.)
**Phi Epsilon**	March 25, 1916	Colorado State University	Fort Collins	Colorado	Active	(Note: Chapter formed from Phi Epsilon (local), established in 1912.)
Sigma Alpha	1916–1937, 1964–1973	Southern Methodist University	Dallas	Texas	Inactive	(Note: Chapter formed from Sigma Alpha (local), established in 1916.)
**Omega Chi**	May 5, 1917 – 1970; 1975	Cornell University	Ithaca	New York	Active	(Note: Chapter formed from Omega Chi (local), established in 1916.)
Theta Sigma	1917–1964	University of Southern California	Los Angeles	California	Inactive	(Note: Chapter formed from the Nous Seous Club, established in 1916.)
Phi	1917–1969	University of California, Berkeley	Berkeley	California	Inactive	(Note: Chapter formed from the Copa de Oro club, established in 1905.)
Sigma Beta	1918–1972	University of Minnesota	Minneapolis	Minnesota	Inactive	(Note: Chapter formed from Sigma Beta (local), established in 1911.)
Psi	1918–1968	Lawrence College	Appleton	Wisconsin	Inactive	(Note: Chapter formed from Delta Phi Sigma (local), established in 1916.)
**Nu**	August 9, 1919	Oklahoma State University–Stillwater	Stillwater	Oklahoma	Active	(Note: Chapter formed from Delta Delta (local), established in 1916.)
**Xi**	March 13, 1920 – 1933; 1979	University of Pittsburgh	Pittsburgh	Pennsylvania	Active	(Note: Chapter formed from Kappa Tau Mu (local), established in 1918.)
**Pi**	April 10, 1920 – 1941; 1947	University of Nebraska–Lincoln	Lincoln	Nebraska	Active	(Note: Chapter formed from Delta Omega (local), established in 1919.)
Tau	1920–1973, 1990–1993	University of Wisconsin–Madison	Madison	Wisconsin	Inactive	(Note: Chapter formed from Tau Kappa Delta (local), established in 1919.)
**Upsilon**	September 25, 1920 – 1970; 2006	Beloit College	Beloit	Wisconsin	Active	(Note: Chapter formed from Kappa Phi Upsilon (local), established in 1919. After going dormant, it reformed in 2006 from Kappa Gamma Lambda (local), established in 2002.)
**Sigma Gamma**	December 14, 1920 – 1993; 2000	Kansas State University	Manhattan	Kansas	Active	(Note: Chapter formed from Iota Psi (local), established in 1916.)
**Sigma Epsilon**	April 7, 1920 or 1921 – 1934; 1981	University of Texas at Austin	Austin	Texas	Active	(Note: Chapter formed from Sigma Epsilon (local), established in 1919.)
**Sigma Zeta**	1921–1971; December 9, 2018	University of Michigan	Ann Arbor	Michigan	Active	(Note: Chapter formed from the Caraytides club, established in 1919.)
Sigma Eta	1921–1969	St. Lawrence University	Canton, New York	New York	Inactive	(Note: Chapter formed from the Pan Pasia club, established in 1918.)
Sigma Theta	1921–1994	University of Pennsylvania	Philadelphia	Pennsylvania	Inactive	(Note: Chapter formed from Delta Pi (local), established in 1920.)
**Sigma Iota**	February 18, 1922	University of Washington	Seattle	Washington	Active	(Note: Chapter formed from Chi Delta Phi (local), established in 1920.)
**Sigma Kappa**	April 29, 1922	Ohio State University	Columbus	Ohio	Active	(Note: Chapter formed from Delta Alpha Chi (local), established in 1921.)
**Sigma Lambda**	September 4, 1922	Auburn University	Auburn	Alabama	Active	(Note: Chapter formed from the Owls, established in 1921.)
**Sigma Mu**	November 18, 1922 – 1968; 2012	George Washington University	Washington, D.C.	District of Columbia	Active	(Note: Chapter formed from Gamma Phi Theta (local), established in 1918.)
Sigma Nu	1923–1971	Syracuse University	Syracuse	New York	Inactive	(Note: Chapter formed from Delta Xi (local), established in 1922.)
Sigma Xi	1923–2002	Bethany College	Bethany	West Virginia	Inactive	(Note: Chapter formed from Phi Lambda Chi (local), established in 1920.)
**Sigma Omicron**	March 10, 1923	University of Illinois Urbana-Champaign	Champaign–Urbana	Illinois	Active	(Note: Chapter formed from Sigma Psi (local), established in 1921.)
**Sigma Pi**	March 24, 1923	Albion College	Albion	Michigan	Active	(Note: Chapter formed from Sorosis (local), established in 1893. No apparent connection with I.C. Sorosis, the predecessor name for Pi Beta Phi.)
Sigma Rho	1923 –1933	University of Iowa	Iowa City	Iowa	Inactive	(Note: Chapter formed from Sigma Rho (local), established in 1921.)
**Sigma Tau**	April 14, 1923	Washington State University	Pullman	Washington	Active	(Note: Chapter formed from the Tonora Club, established in 1920)
**Sigma Upsilon**	September 15, 1923 – 1941; 1955	Indiana University Bloomington	Bloomington	Indiana	Active	(Note: Chapter formed from Zeta Zeta Zeta (local), established in 1921.)
**Sigma Phi**	March 22, 1924	University of Georgia	Athens	Georgia	Active	(Note: Chapter formed from Delta Kappa (local), established in 1923.)
Sigma Chi	1924–1942	University of Montana	Missoula	Montana	Inactive	(Note: Chapter formed from Delta Sigma Chi (local), established in 1919.)
**Sigma Psi**	May 3, 1924	North Dakota State University	Fargo	North Dakota	Active	(Note: Chapter formed from Gamma Kappa Psi (local), established in 1923.)
Sigma Omega	1924–1987	Montana State University	Bozeman	Montana	Inactive	(Note: Chapter formed from Iota Delta (local), established in 1919.)
**Alpha Alpha**	November 29, 1924	Michigan State University	East Lansing	Michigan	Active	(Note: Chapter formed from the Letonian Club, established in 1916.)
Alpha Beta	1924–1943	Mount Union College	Alliance	Ohio	Inactive	(Note: Chapter formed from Phi Zeta (local), established in 1921.)
**Alpha Delta**	March 4, 1925	Rhodes College	Memphis	Tennessee	Active	(Note: Chapter formed from Phi Kappa (local), established in 1923.)
**Alpha Epsilon**	September 26, 1925	University of Tennessee	Knoxville	Tennessee	Active	(Note: Chapter formed from Phi Alpha (local), established in 1921.)
Alpha Zeta	1925–1944	Ohio Wesleyan University	Delaware	Ohio	Inactive	(Note: Chapter formed from Delta Rho Delta (local), established in 1922.)
Alpha Eta	1926–1933	DePauw University	Greencastle	Indiana	Inactive	(Note: Chapter formed from Eta Rho Psi (local), established in 1922.)
**Alpha Theta**	April 24, 1924 – 1937; March 2014	University of Vermont	Burlington	Vermont	Active	(Note: Chapter formed from Phi Delta Zeta (local), established in 1921.)
**Alpha Iota**	October 2, 1926	University of California, Los Angeles	Los Angeles	California	Active	(Note: Chapter formed from Kappa Xi Zeta (local), established in 1925.)
**Alpha Kappa**	October 16, 1926 – 1982; 1987	Oregon State University	Corvallis	Oregon	Active	(Note: Chapter formed from Beta Kappa (local), established in 1921.)
**Alpha Lambda**	October 23, 1926 – 1933; 1990	University of Oregon	Eugene	Oregon	Active	(Note: Chapter formed from Tau Nu (local), established in 1922.)
**Alpha Mu**	January 15, 1927	University of Mississippi	Oxford	Mississippi	Active	(Note: Chapter formed from Sigma Alpha (local), established in 1926.)
**Alpha Nu**	October 22, 1927	Wittenberg University	Springfield	Ohio	Active	(Note: Chapter formed in 1915 as the Gamma chapter of Aloquin. It left in 1918 and became Theta Gamma Rho (local), which joined Kappa Delta a decade later.)
**Alpha Xi**	April 14, 1928	University of Louisville	Louisville	Kentucky	Active	(Note: Chapter formed from Theta Pi (local), established in 1926.)
**Alpha Omicron**	October 20, 1928	Queens University of Charlotte	Charlotte	North Carolina	Active	(Note: Chapter formed from Zeta Kappa (local), established in 1923.)
**Alpha Pi**	October 23, 1928	College of William and Mary	Williamsburg	Virginia	Active	(Note: Chapter formed from Chi Alpha (local), established in 1927.)
**Alpha Rho**	November 16, 1929	University of Maryland, College Park	College Park	Maryland	Active	(Note: Chapter formed from Kappa Xi (local), established in 1924.)
**Alpha Sigma**	November 23, 1929 – 1962; 1988	University of New Hampshire	Durham	New Hampshire	Active	(Note: Chapter formed from Delta Kappa (local), established in 1919.)
Alpha Tau	1930–1943, 1969–1974	Oglethorpe University	Brookhaven	Georgia	Inactive	(Note: Chapter formed from Zeta Tau (local), established in 1920.)
Alpha Upsilon	April 8, 1930 – May 31, 2024	Birmingham–Southern College	Birmingham	Alabama	Inactive	(Note: Chapter formed from Delta Club (local), established in 1929.)
**Alpha Phi**	February 21, 1931	Westminster College	New Wilmington	Pennsylvania	Active	(Note: Chapter formed from Phi Delta Chi (local), established in 1926.)
**Alpha Chi**	April 25, 1931	Louisiana Tech University	Ruston	Louisiana	Active	(Note: Chapter formed from Lambda Theta (local), established in 1926.)
**Alpha Psi**	May 2, 1931	Drury University	Springfield	Missouri	Active	(Note: Chapter formed from Tau Kappa Gamma (local), established in 1927.)
Alpha Omega	1931–1935	Butler University	Indianapolis	Indiana	Inactive	(Note: Chapter formed from Chi Theta Chi (local), established in 1928.)
**Beta Alpha**	June 10, 1932 – 1966; 1978	University of Virginia	Charlottesville	Virginia	Active	(Note: Chapter formed from Pi Chi (local), established in 1924. After going dormant, it reformed from Delta Kappa, established in 1978.)
Beta Beta	1933–1969	Brooklyn College	Brooklyn, New York City	New York	Inactive	(Note: Chapter formed from Alpha Phi (local), established in 1930. No apparent connection with Alpha Phi national sorority.)
Beta Gamma	1936–1996	Monmouth College	Monmouth	Illinois	Inactive	(Note: Chapter formed from Theta Chi Mu (local), established in 1930.)
**Beta Delta**	May 8, 1937	Utah State University	Logan	Utah	Active	(Note: Chapter formed from Beta Delta (local), established in 1915.)
**Beta Epsilon**	September 11, 1937	University of Tulsa	Tulsa	Oklahoma	Active	(Note: Chapter formed from the Tu Sans club, established in 1933.)
**Beta Zeta**	April 27, 1940	University of South Carolina	Columbia	South Carolina	Active	
Beta Eta	1940–1956	Middlebury College	Middlebury	Vermont	Inactive	(Note: Chapter formed from Theta Chi Omega (local), established in 1937.)
**Beta Theta**	November 23, 1941	Pennsylvania State University	University Park	Pennsylvania	Active	(Note: Chapter formed from the Charitides club, established in 1938.)
Beta Iota	1943–1971	American University	Washington, D.C.	District of Columbia	Inactive	(Note: Chapter formed from Sigma Phi Delta (local), established in 1938.)
**Beta Kappa**	February 23, 1945 – 1963; 1999	University of Tennessee at Chattanooga	Chattanooga	Tennessee	Active	
**Beta Mu**	January 5, 1946 – 2005; 2007	Bowling Green State University	Bowling Green	Ohio	Active	(Note: Chapter formed from Alpha Phi Epsilon (local), established in 1941.)
**Beta Lambda**	January 19, 1946	Georgetown College	Georgetown	Kentucky	Active	(Note: Chapter formed from Lambda Chi (local), established in 1923.)
**Beta Nu**	April 27, 1946 – 1977; 1982	University of Toledo	Toledo	Ohio	Active	(Note: Chapter formed from Zeta Gamma Phi (local), established in 1932.)
Beta Xi	1947–1962, 1984–199x ?	University of Colorado Boulder	Boulder	Colorado	Inactive	
**Beta Pi**	September 11, 1948	University of Florida	Gainesville	Florida	Active	(Note: Chapter formed from Delta Kappa (local), established in 1947.)
**Beta Sigma**	May 14, 1949	University of Southern Mississippi	Hattiesburg	Mississippi	Active	(Note: Chapter formed from Sigma Theta Kappa (local), established in 1935.)
**Beta Rho**	May 28, 1949	San Diego State University	San Diego	California	Active	(Note: Chapter formed from Epsilon Pi Theta (local), established in 1931.)
**Beta Tau**	November 19, 1949	Vanderbilt University	Nashville	Tennessee	Active	
**Beta Upsilon**	May 20, 1950	Susquehanna University	Selinsgrove	Pennsylvania	Active	(Note: Chapter formed from Kappa Delta Phi (local), established in 1916.)
Beta Phi	1951–2002	West Virginia University	Morgantown	West Virginia	Inactive	
**Beta Chi**	May 12, 1951	University of North Carolina at Chapel Hill	Chapel Hill	North Carolina	Active	
**Beta Psi**	January 12, 1952 – 1989; 2003–2010; 2015	Arizona State University	Tempe	Arizona	Active	(Note: Chapter formed from Gamma Theta (local), established in 1925.)
Gamma Alpha	1952–990	Northern Illinois University	DeKalb	Illinois	Inactive	(Note: Chapter formed from Chi Upsilon (local), established in 1951.)
**Gamma Beta**	1954–1975; April 12, 2009	University of North Texas	Denton	Texas	Active	(Note: Chapter formed from Zeta Pi Gamma (local), established in 1942.)
**Gamma Gamma**	February 12, 1955	High Point University	High Point	North Carolina	Active	(Note: Chapter formed from Theta Phi (local), established in 1927.)
**Gamma Delta**	November 13, 1954	East Tennessee State University	Johnson City	Tennessee	Active	(Note: Chapter formed from Sigma Omega (local), established in 1911.)
**Gamma Epsilon**	February 5, 1955	Florida Southern College	Lakeland	Florida	Active	
**Gamma Zeta**	1955–1993; 2023	Texas Christian University	Fort Worth	Texas	Active	
Gamma Eta	1955–1975	Ohio University	Athens	Ohio	Inactive	(Note: Chapter formed from Alpha Theta (local), established in 1952.)
Gamma Theta	1955–1993	University of Oklahoma	Norman	Oklahoma	Inactive	
**Gamma Iota**	February 4, 1956 – 1966; 1978	San Jose State University	San Jose	California	Active	
**Gamma Kappa**	September 29, 1956	University of Louisiana at Lafayette	Lafayette	Louisiana	Active	(Note: Chapter formed from Delta Epsilon Nu (local), established in 1925.)
Gamma Lambda	1956–1983	Lamar University	Beaumont,	Texas	Inactive	(Note: Chapter formed from Zeta Chi (local), established in 1944.)
**Gamma Nu**	March 1, 1958	Miami University	Oxford	Ohio	Active	
**Gamma Mu**	May 5, 1958	Valdosta State University	Valdosta	Georgia	Active	(Note: Chapter formed from Zeta Chi (local), established in 1955.)
**Gamma Xi**	October 25, 1958	Kentucky Wesleyan College	Owensboro	Kentucky	Active	(Note: Chapter formed from Chi Upsilon Chi (local), established in 1932.)
**Gamma Omicron**	November 15, 1958	Wayne State University	Detroit	Michigan	Active	(Note: Chapter formed from Delta Gamma Chi (local), established in 1924.)
Gamma Pi	1959–1985	Emory University	Atlanta	Georgia	Inactive	(Note: Chapter formed from Tau Kappa Delta (local), established in 1953.)
Gamma Rho	1959–1995	Sam Houston State University	Huntsville	Texas	Inactive	(Note: Chapter formed from the Loulie Estill Society, established in 1938.)
**Gamma Sigma**	February 6, 1960 – 1984; 2001	East Carolina University	Greenville	North Carolina	Active	(Note: Chapter formed from Delta Sigma Chi (local), established in 1958.)
**Gamma Tau**	April 30, 1960 – 1967; 2008	Ripon College	Ripon	Wisconsin	Active	(Note: Chapter formed from Delta Phi Sigma (local), established in 1909. After going dormant, it reformed from Alpha Psi Delta (local), established in 2000.)
Gamma Upsilon	May 14, 1960 – 2020	East Texas A&M University	Commerce	Texas	Inactive	(Note: Chapter formed from the Kaidsharn club, established in 1950.) (Note: Texas A&M University at Commerce changed its name to East Texas A&M University on 7 November 2024.)
Gamma Phi	1961–1978	Tennessee Wesleyan College	Athens	Tennessee	Inactive	(Note: Chapter formed from Kappa Delta Phi (local), established in 1944.)
**Gamma Chi**	February 3, 1962	Lenoir–Rhyne University	Hickory	North Carolina	Active	(Note: Chapter formed from the Philia club, established in 1948.)
**Gamma Psi**	November 10, 1962	Delta State University	Cleveland	Mississippi	Active	(Note: Chapter formed from Omega Phi (local), established in 1960.)
Gamma Omega	1964–1999	Slippery Rock University	Slippery Rock	Pennsylvania	Inactive	(Note: Chapter formed from Beta Chi Gamma (local), established in 1961.)
Delta Alpha	1964–1976	University of Texas at El Paso	El Paso	Texas	Inactive	(Note: Chapter formed from Phi Beta Chi (local), established in 1962.)
**Delta Beta**	May 9, 1964 – 1984; 1997	Eastern Illinois University	Charleston	Illinois	Active	(Note: Chapter formed from Theta Pi (local), established in 1963.)
**Delta Gamma**	March 27, 1965	Western Kentucky University	Bowling Green	Kentucky	Active	(Note: Chapter formed from Zeta Tau Omega (local), formed previously.)
**Delta Delta**	January 15, 1966	Troy University	Troy	Alabama	Active	(Note: Chapter formed from Alpha Zeta Chi (local), established in 1964.)
Delta Epsilon	1966–1986	University of Texas–Pan American	Edinburg	Texas	Inactive	
**Delta Zeta**	February 25, 1967	University of Louisiana at Monroe	Monroe	Louisiana	Active	
**Delta Eta**	January 14, 1967	University of South Florida	Tampa	Florida	Active	(Note: Chapter formed from the F.I.A. club, established in 1961.)
**Delta Theta**	1968 –1985, 2023	Samford University	Homewood	Alabama	Active	
**Delta Iota**	1967–1984, October 27, 2013	Murray State University	Murray	Kentucky	Active	
Delta Kappa	1968–1985	Arkansas State University	Jonesboro	Arkansas	Inactive	
**Delta Lambda**	April 6, 1968	Georgia Southern University	Statesboro	Georgia	Active	
**Delta Mu**	March 23, 1968	Newberry College	Newberry	South Carolina	Active	(Note: Chapter formed from Delta Chi.)
Delta Nu	1968–1989	Indiana University of Pennsylvania	Indiana	Pennsylvania	Inactive	
Delta Xi	1968–1974	Eastern New Mexico University	Portales	New Mexico	Inactive	
**Delta Omicron**	December 7, 1968	Eastern Kentucky University	Richmond	Kentucky	Active	(Note: Chapter formed from Alpha Pi Kappa (local), established in 1966.)
**Delta Pi**	March 15, 1969	Middle Tennessee State University	Murfreesboro	Tennessee	Active	(Note: Chapter formed from Phi Theta Psi (local), established in 1966.)
Delta Rho	1969–1981	James Madison University	Harrisonburg	Virginia	Inactive	
**Delta Sigma**	March 29, 1969	University of South Alabama	Mobile	Alabama	Active	
**Delta Tau**	April 26, 1969	Morehead State University	Morehead	Kentucky	Active	(Note: Chapter formed from Chi Phi Delta (local), established in 1965.)
**Delta Upsilon**	September 27, 1969	Tennessee Tech	Cookeville	Tennessee	Active	(Note: Chapter formed from Zeta Phi (local), established in 1967.)
**Delta Phi**	October 18, 1969	Georgia Southwestern State University	Americus	Georgia	Active	(Note: Chapter formed from Kappa Delta Theta (local), established in 1967.)
**Delta Chi**	January 30, 1971	LaGrange College	LaGrange	Georgia	Active	(Note: Chapter formed from Alpha Kappa Theta (local), established in 1906.)
**Delta Psi**	April 3, 1971	University of West Georgia	Carrollton	Georgia	Active	(Note: Chapter formed from Phi Kappa Zeta (local), established in 1968.)
**Delta Omega**	May 1, 1971	Mississippi State University	Starkville	Mississippi	Active	
**Epsilon Alpha**	October 28, 1972	Missouri University of Science and Technology	Rolla	Missouri	Active	(Note: Chapter formed from Lambda Sigma (local), established in 1969.)
Epsilon Beta	1973–1980	West Texas A&M University	Canyon	Texas	Inactive	
**Epsilon Gamma**	February 17, 1973 – 2019; 2021	University of North Georgia	Dahlonega	Georgia	Active	(Note: Chapter formed from Phi Chi Omega (local), established in 1970.)
Epsilon Delta	1973–199x ?	Austin Peay State University	Clarksville	Tennessee	Inactive	(Note: Chapter formed from Kappa Delta Chi (local), established in 1971.)
**Epsilon Epsilon**	March 24, 1973	Appalachian State University	Boone	North Carolina	Active	(Note: Chapter formed from the Philia Society, established in 1970.)
**Epsilon Zeta**	May 5, 1973 – 1989; 2008	University of North Carolina at Pembroke	Pembroke	North Carolina	Active	(Note: Chapter formed from Theta Kappa (local), established in 1968.)
Epsilon Eta	1973–1987	Illinois State University	Normal	Illinois	Inactive	(Note: Chapter formed from the Mai Kai club, established in 1963.)
Epsilon Theta	1975–1978	South Dakota State University	Brookings	South Dakota	Inactive	
**Epsilon Iota**	April 3, 1976	University of Missouri	Columbia	Missouri	Active	
Epsilon Kappa	1976–1987	California State Polytechnic University, San Luis Obispo	San Luis Obispo	California	Inactive	
**Epsilon Lambda**	January 8, 1977	University of Alabama in Huntsville	Huntsville	Alabama	Active	
Epsilon Mu	1977–1982	Methodist University	Fayetteville	North Carolina	Inactive	(Note: Formed as Methodist College, the university took its present name in 2006.)
Epsilon Nu	1977–1985	Idaho State University	Pocatello	Idabo	Inactive	
Epsilon Xi	1977–1986	Houston Baptist University	Houston	Texas	Inactive	(Note: Chapter formed from Epsilon Delta Pi (local), established in 1966.)
**Epsilon Omicron**	May 27, 1978	University of Central Florida	Orange County	Florida	Active	
**Epsilon Pi**	April 7, 1979	Virginia Tech	Blacksburg	Virginia	Active	
**Epsilon Rho**	April 21, 1979	University of Rochester	Rochester	New York	Active	
**Epsilon Sigma**	November 17, 1979	Wofford College	Spartanburg	South Carolina	Active	
**Epsilon Tau**	April 26, 1980	Clemson University	Clemson	South Carolina	Active	
**Epsilon Upsilon**	March 7, 1981	California State Polytechnic University, Pomona	Pomona	California	Active	
Epsilon Phi	1982–1994	University of California, Santa Barbara	Santa Barbara	California	Inactive	
Epsilon Chi	1983–2010	Baylor University	Waco	Texas	Inactive	
**Epsilon Psi**	April 20, 1985	Francis Marion University	Florence	South Carolina	Active	(Note: Chapter formed from Delta Kappa (local), established in 1984.)
**Zeta Alpha**	February 21, 1987	Texas Tech University	Lubbock	Texas	Active	
**Zeta Gamma**	April 30, 1989	University of Arkansas	Fayetteville	Arkansas	Active	
**Zeta Beta**	February 10, 1990	Union University	Jackson	Tennessee	Active	
Zeta Delta	1990–1993	University of Connecticut	Storrs	Connecticut	Inactive	
**Zeta Epsilon**	April 28, 1990	University of Kansas	Lawrence	Kansas	Active	
**Zeta Zeta**	June 3, 1990	California State University, San Bernardino	San Bernardino	California	Active	
Zeta Eta	1991–1997	Loyola Marymount University	Los Angeles	California	Inactive	
**Zeta Theta**	November 9, 1991	The College of New Jersey	Ewing Township	New Jersey	Active	(Note: Chapter formed from Kappa Sigma Phi (local), established in 1989.)
**Zeta Iota**	February 29, 1992	Saint Louis University	St. Louis	Missouri	Active	
**Zeta Kappa**	April 4, 1992	Ball State University	Muncie	Indiana	Active	(Note: Chapter formed from Lambda Beta Alpha (local), established in 1989.)
**Zeta Lambda**	1992–2003; 2026	University of Delaware	Newark	Delaware	Active	
**Zeta Mu**	November 7, 1992	Towson University	Towson	Maryland	Active	(Note: Chapter formed from Pi Delta Epsilon (local), established in 1988.)
**Zeta Nu**	April 4, 1993	University of Lynchburg	Lynchburg	Virginia	Active	(Note: Chapter formed from Lambda Kappa Delta (local), established in 1986.)
**Zeta Xi**	March 14, 1994	Rollins College	Winter Park	Florida	Active	(Note: Chapter formed from the XLR8 club, established in 1989.)
**Zeta Omicron**	November 14, 1993	Wake Forest University	Winston-Salem	North Carolina	Active	(Note: Chapter formed from the Links Society, established in 1981.)
**Zeta Pi**	March 19, 1994	Furman University	Greenville	South Carolina	Active	(Note: Chapter formed from Alpha Chi Alpha (local), established in 1987.)
**Zeta Sigma**	November 16, 1996	College of Charleston	Charleston	South Carolina	Active	
Zeta Tau	1997–2017	Washington and Lee University	Lexington	Virginia	Inactive	
Zeta Upsilon	April 12, 1997 – May 4, 2024	Stephens College	Columbia	Missouri	Inactive	
Zeta Phi	1997–2002	Pittsburg State University	Pittsburg	Kansas	Inactive	(Note: Chapter formed from Delta Theta Omega (local), established in 1996.)
**Zeta Chi**	November 15, 1997	University of Idaho	Moscow	Idaho	Active	
**Zeta Psi**	April 18, 1998	Valparaiso University	Valparaiso	Indiana	Active	(Note: Chapter formed from Kappa Phi Omega (local), established in 1961.)
**Zeta Omega**	November 15, 1998	University of Memphis	Memphis	Tennessee	Active	
**Eta Alpha**	November 20, 1999	Texas A&M University	College Station	Texas	Active	
**Eta Beta**	November 12, 2000	Bradley University	Peoria	Illinois	Active	
Eta Gamma	December 2, 2001 – 2024	John Carroll University	University Heights	Ohio	Inactive	(Note: Chapter formed from Theta Kappa (local).)
**Eta Delta**	December 1, 2002	Wright State University	Fairborn	Ohio	Active	
**Eta Epsilon**	April 13, 2003	Sewanee: The University of the South	Sewanee	Tennessee	Active	
**Eta Eta**	November 1, 2003	Northern Kentucky University	Highland Heights	Kentucky	Active	
**Eta Zeta**	December 6, 2003	University of North Florida	Jacksonville	Florida	Active	
**Eta Theta**	April 4, 2004	Villanova University	Villanova	Pennsylvania	Active	
**Eta Iota**	March 11, 2007	Pace University	New York City	New York	Active	
**Eta Kappa**	April 13, 2008	Northeastern University	Boston	Massachusetts	Active	
**Eta Lambda**	May 3, 2008	Franklin & Marshall College	Lancaster	Pennsylvania	Active	(Note: Chapter formed from the Nu chapter of Kappa Beta Gamma, which formed in 2003 and withdrew in 2008 to join Kappa Delta.)
**Eta Mu**	November 15, 2008	Georgia College & State University	Milledgeville	Georgia	Active	
**Eta Nu**	March 28, 2009	Sacred Heart University	Fairfield	Connecticut	Active	(Note: Chapter formed from Nu Epsilon Omega (local), established in 1978.)
**Eta Xi**	November 19, 2009	Dartmouth College	Hanover	New Hampshire	Active	
**Eta Rho**	November 12, 2009	Wilmington College	Wilmington	Ohio	Active	
**Eta Sigma**	April 11, 2010	University of Arkansas at Little Rock	Little Rock	Arkansas	Active	
**Eta Tau**	December 5, 2010	Florida Gulf Coast University	Fort Myers	Florida	Active	
**Eta Upsilon**	November 20, 2010	North Carolina State University	Raleigh	North Carolina	Active	
**Eta Phi**	November 21, 2010	Boston University	Boston	Massachusetts	Active	
**Eta Chi**	April 3, 2011	Elon University	Elon	North Carolina	Active	
**Eta Psi**	October 9, 2011	University of North Carolina at Charlotte	Charlotte	North Carolina	Active	
**Eta Omega**	October 21, 2012	Kennesaw State University	Cobb County	Georgia	Active	
**Theta Alpha**	November 4, 2012	Quinnipiac University	Hamden	Connecticut	Active	
**Zeta Rho**	November 17, 2012	University of San Diego	San Diego	California	Active	
**Theta Beta**	March 23, 2013	Washington University in St. Louis	St. Louis County	Missouri	Active	
**Theta Gamma**	April 28, 2013	Brown University	Providence	Rhode Island	Active	
**Theta Delta**	October 25, 2013	University of Dayton	Dayton	Ohio	Active	
**Theta Epsilon**	November 10, 2013	University of West Florida	Pensacola	Florida	Active	
**Theta Zeta**	November 17, 2013	Lehigh University	Bethlehem	Pennsylvania	Active	
**Theta Eta**	November 24, 2013	Old Dominion University	Norfolk	Virginia	Active	
**Theta Theta**	April 13, 2014	University of Rhode Island	Kingston	Rhode Island	Active	
**Theta Iota**	December 6, 2014	University of North Dakota	Grand Forks	North Dakota	Active	
**Theta Kappa**	March 8, 2015	Northern Arizona University	Flagstaff	Arizona	Active	
**Theta Lambda**	March 29, 2015	Marquette University	Milwaukee	Wisconsin	Active	
**Theta Mu**	November 15, 2015	University of Richmond	Richmond	Virginia	Active	
**Theta Nu**	November 15, 2015	Purdue University	West Lafayette	Indiana	Active	
**Theta Xi**	March 20, 2016	University of North Carolina Wilmington	Wilmington	North Carolina	Active	
**Theta Omicron**	November 13, 2016	West Chester University	West Chester	Pennsylvania	Active	
**Iota (Second)**	2016	Centre College	Danville	Kentucky	Active	
**Theta Pi**	October 28, 2017	University of Alabama at Birmingham	Birmingham	Alabama	Active	
**Theta Rho**	November 12, 2017	George Mason University	Fairfax	Virginia	Active	
**Theta Tau**	November 3, 2018	Bentley University	Waltham	Massachusetts	Active	
**Theta Upsilon**	November 4, 2018	Loyola University Chicago	Chicago	Illinois	Active	
