= Sereno Watson =

American botanist (1826–1892)

Sereno Watson FAAAS, NAS
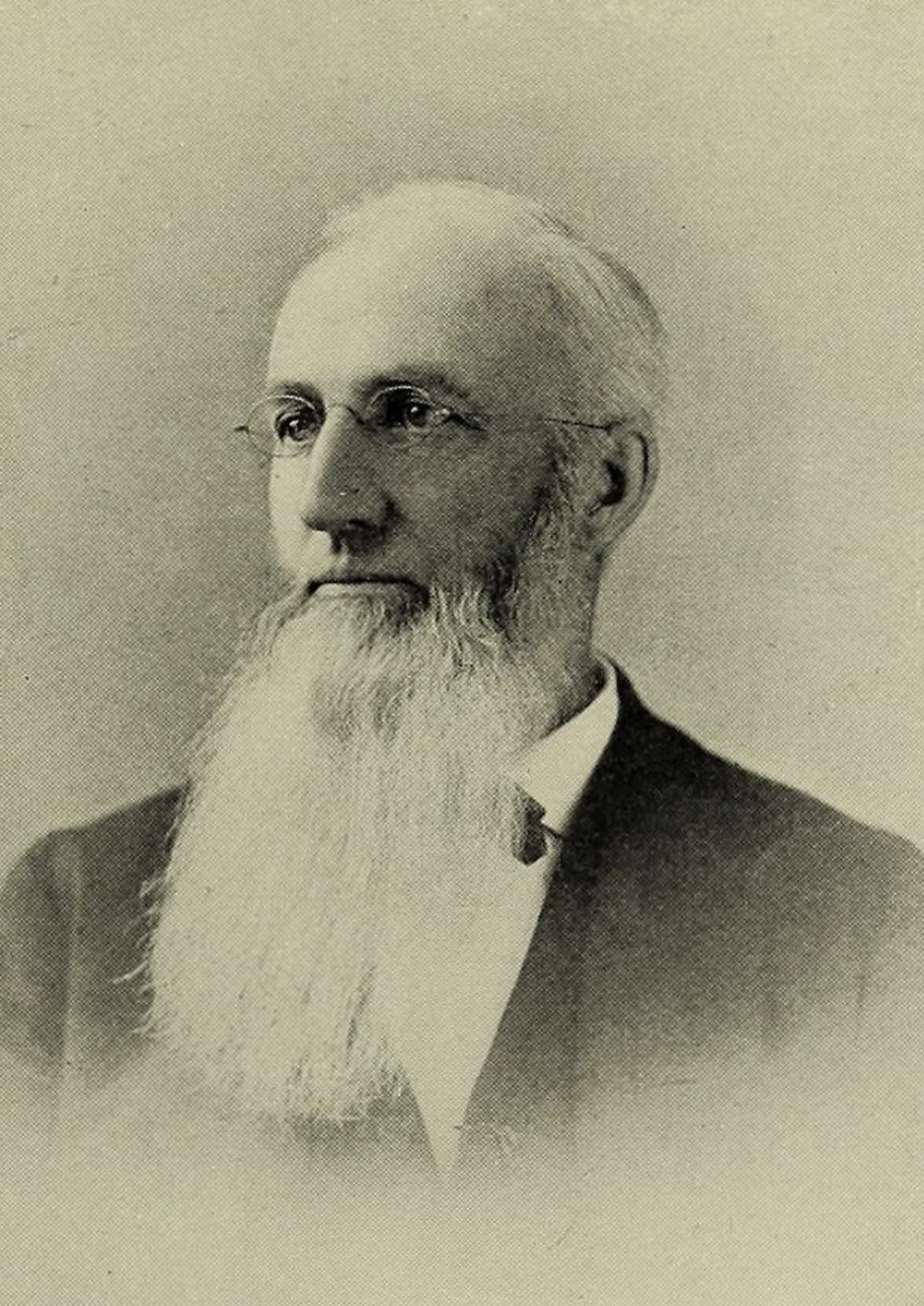
- Born: December 1, 1826; East Windsor Hill, Connecticut, US
- Died: March 9, 1892 (aged 65); Cambridge, Massachusetts, US
- Education: Yale University
- Occupation: Botanist
- Employer: Harvard University
- Known for: Gray Herbarium curator
- Botanist author abbreviation: S.Watson

Sereno Watson FAAAS, NAS (December 1, 1826 – March 9, 1892) was an American botanist. He served as curator of the Gray Herbarium at Harvard University and as botanist on the Geological Exploration of the Fortieth Parallel scientific expedition.

== Early life and education ==
Watson was born on December 1, 1826, in East Windsor Hill, Connecticut, the ninth of thirteen children of Henry and Julia (Reed) Watson, both of English descent. He grew up on the family's farm. Throughout his life, he was marked for his reticent and retiring disposition. Watson attended East Windsor Academy and graduated with his bachelor's degree from Yale University in 1847. A capable though not brilliant student, he received honors in Latin composition and Latin translations while at Yale. He graduated in the same class as noted botanists John Donnell Smith and Henry Griswold Jessup.

After graduation, he drifted through various occupations, working as a schoolteacher and studying medicine for five years. In 1852, his uncle, Julius Reed, a founder of Iowa College, got him a job as a tutor at the college. In 1854, Watson completed his medical training and joined the practice of his elder brother, Dr. Louis Watson, in Quincy, Illinois. In 1856, he went to Greensboro, Alabama, to work as secretary of Planters' Insurance Company, of which his eldest brother, Henry Watson, was president. Henry Watson was an extremely wealthy plantation owner and enslaver, enslaving at least 200 individuals. When Henry Watson relocated to Northampton, Massachusetts at the dawn of the Civil War, he left Serano in charge of the 116 individuals still enslaved to him at the time. In 1861, he went to Hartford, Connecticut, and assisted Henry Barnard to edit the Journal of Education.

== Scientific career ==
In January 1866, Watson entered the Sheffield Scientific School, where he studied chemistry and mineralogy for a year. In March 1867, he sailed for California but without any definite plans. In July, he sought out a scientific expedition led by Yale geologist Clarence King and convinced the expedition leaders to take him on. The expedition botanist, William Whitman Bailey, was ailing, so Watson assisted him to collect and preserve plants, in which he had taken an amateur interest since his Illinois days. He took over as "botanist in charge" after Bailey left the expedition in March 1868. Watson collected specimens across Nevada and Utah as far east as the Uinta Mountains.

In fall 1869, Watson returned to Yale to work on the specimens he had collected, collaborating with Professor Daniel Cady Eaton. In late 1870 he joined the Gray Herbarium of Harvard University. In 1871, he published Volume 5 of the publications of the Geological Survey of the Fortieth Parallel, including a "Catalogue of the Known Plants of Nevada and Utah." The 426-page catalog identified 1,325 plant species and constituted the first descriptive list of the whole known flora of any region in western North America.

In 1873, Professor Asa Gray appointed Watson to serve as his assistant at Harvard's Gray Herbarium. On June 29, 1874, Watson became curator of the Gray Herbarium, a position he held until his death. From 1881 to 1883 he also held a concurrent academic appointment as instructor in phytology and phytogeography at Harvard University. He made several collecting trips, including to Montana in 1880 and Guatemala in 1885. Watson was elected a Fellow of the American Academy of Arts and Sciences in 1874, a member of the National Academy of Sciences in 1889, and a foreign member of the Linnean Society of London in 1890.

Watson specialized in systematic botany and plant taxonomy, publishing a series of eighteen papers entitled Contributions to American Botany in the pages of the Proceedings of the American Academy of Arts and Sciences. He published several scientific monographs, including Botany of California (1880), and more than 100 articles and reviews in scientific journals such as the Bulletin of the Torrey Botanical Club, The American Naturalist, American Journal of Science and Arts, Science, and Botanical Gazette.

== Death and legacy ==
Watson died at the age of 65 on March 9, 1892, in Cambridge, Massachusetts. He died as a result of a recurring global influenza pandemic; the illness had damaged his heart. He was interred at Mount Auburn Cemetery. He never married or had children.

The standard author abbreviation S.Watson is used to indicate this person as the author when citing a botanical name.

== Select works ==
- Botany, in Report of the geological exploration of the 40th parallel made ... by Clarence King, 1871
- Watson, Sereno (1879). "Revision of the North American Liliaceae: Descriptions of Some New Species of North American Plants". Proceedings of the American Academy of Arts and Sciences. XIV: 213–312. doi:10.2307/25138538. JSTOR 25138538.
- Watson, Sereno, ed. (1880). Botany of California, Vol. 2. Geological Survey of California. Vol. v.2. Cambridge, Mass: John Wilson and Son.
