= Geological Exploration of the Fortieth Parallel =

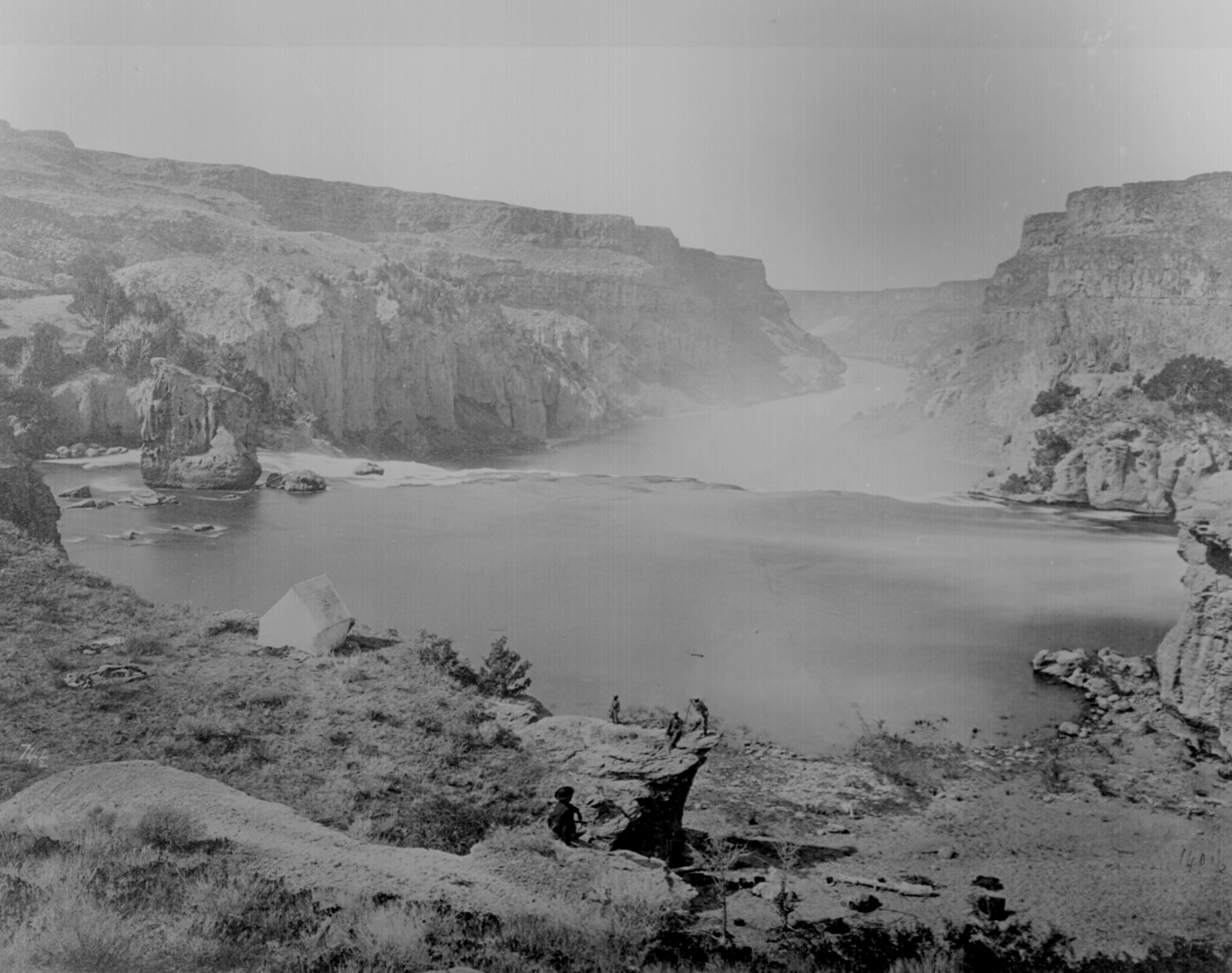
A member of Clarence King's Geological Exploration of the 40th Parallel surveying from a rock. Shoshone Canyon and Falls, Idaho Territory, in background. By Timothy H. O'Sullivan, 1868

The Geological Exploration of the Fortieth Parallel was a geological survey made by order of the Secretary of War according to acts of Congress of March 2, 1867, and March 3, 1869, under the direction of Brig. and Bvt. Major General A. A. Humphreys, Chief of Engineers, by Clarence King, U. S. geologist. More commonly known as the Fortieth Parallel Survey, the survey conducted field work from 1867 to 1872, exploring the area along the fortieth parallel north from northeastern California, through Nevada, to eastern Wyoming.

== Results ==
The results of the survey were published in eight volumes of the Fortieth Parallel Survey:

- Vol. I. Systematic geology, by Clarence King, U. S. Geologist. 1878. xii, 803 pp., and atlas of 12 sheets.
- Vol. II. Descriptive geology, by Arnold Hague and S. F. Emmons. 1877. xiii, 890 pp.
- Vol. III. Mining industry, by James Duncan Hague, with geological contributions by Clarence King. 1870. xv, 647 pp. and atlas of 14 sheets.
- Vol. IV. Part I, Palaeontology. by F. B. Meek. Part II, Palaeontology, by James Hall and R. P. Whitfield. Part III, Ornithology, by Robert Ridgway. 1877. xii, 669 pp.
- Vol. V. Botany, by Sereno Watson, aided by Prof. Daniel C. Eaton and others. 1871. liii, 525 pp.
- Vol. VI. Microscopical petrography, by Ferdinand Zirkel. 1876. xv, 297 pp.
- Vol. VII. Odontornithes, A monograph on the extinct toothed birds of North America, by Othniel Charles Marsh. 1880. xv, 201 pp.
- Special Publication: List of plants collected in Nevada and Utah, 1867-69; numbered as distributed. Sereno Watson, collector.

Atlases:

- Atlas accompanying the report of the Geological Exploration of the Fortieth Parallel. by Clarence King, U. S. geologist-in-charge. 1876. Julius Bien, Lithographer. Folio, 2 11., (title and legend), 1 single and 11 double folio sheets (1 single folio map, 10 double folio maps, 1 double folio section).
- Atlas accompanying Volume III on Mining Industry. [List of plates.] Engraved and printed by Julius Bien, New York. Folio, 11. (title page), 14 plates.
