= Candida Colosimo =

American painter

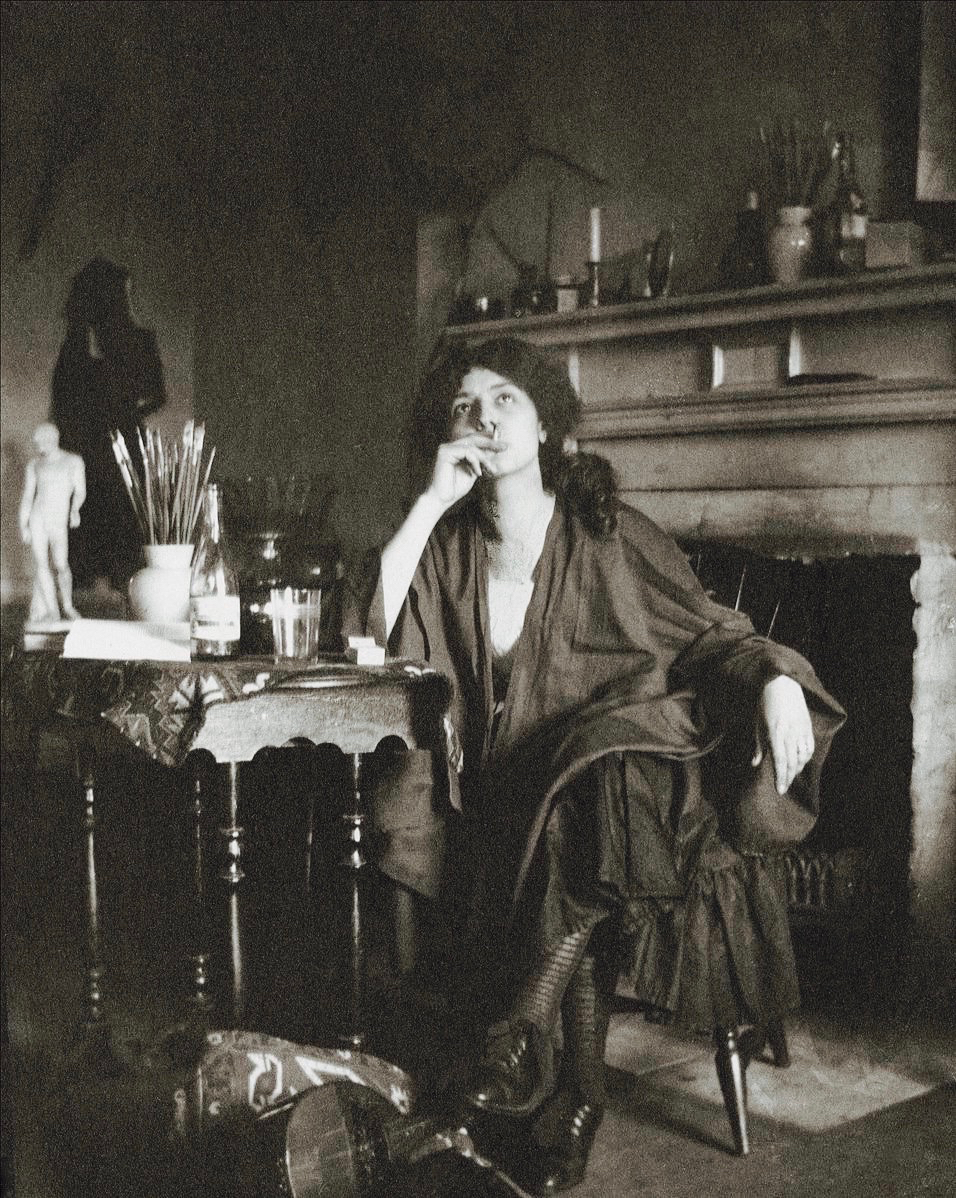
Candida Natiello Colosimo in her American studio, around 1900.

Candida Natiello Colosimo (Vietri di Potenza, 17 November 1878 – Florence, 25 April 1972) was an Italian-American painter, student of Howard Helmick, Red Cross nurse and philanthropist.

== Early life ==
Candida Natiello, later Colosimo (sometimes mistakenly called "Collosino or Colosino"), daughter of Gerardo Natiello and Filomena Petrone, derived from a wealthy family of landed gentry who anyway left Italy to move to Americas. In early 1880, the father decided to leave Naples to reach Montevideo; come back to Europe he took the decision to sail for New York City, where the all family disembarked in March 1882. It seems that there were the reasons to start a new life in America, but the sudden death of her father (1883) changed quickly their lives. Through the phase of mourning and the difficulties of settling in a new country, the mother tried a new relationship with Giuseppe Colosimo, man who later married happily.

== Life in Washington, D.C. ==
In 1893 the Colosimos moved to Washington, D.C., where Giuseppe, known tailor master, was already included in the economic and social life of the city. In the Nineties, as a student, Candida participated in several exhibitions of paintings at the Corcoran Gallery, where finally she deservedly exhibited in May 1900 due to the benevolence of Mary Foote Henderson. Later, the artist became vice-president of the Salmagundi Club (Washington, D.C.), that was also founded by her on April 11, 1898, and it was called with the prestigious same name of Club's New York. Around 1900, under the direction of Eliphalet Frazer Andrews she graduated at the Corcoran School of Art, where, for a short time, she also taught. In May 1901 Miss Colosimo participated in the exhibition of oil paintings and drawings made by students of Howard Helmick and exposed to Veerhoff's Galleries. In the early twentieth century she was also professor of drawing in Fairmont Seminary, and in 1902 her presence was attested, as a teacher, at Washington Seminary (Washington, D.C.); she had her own studio where she gave private lessons.

== Life in Italy, Florence and Naples ==
In the summer of 1904 Miss Colosimo returned to Italy to attend the "Scuola Libera del Nudo" to the "Accademia di Belle Arti" in Florence. Due to her dual citizenship Candida became part of the American colony that lived here and met her second master, Julius Rolshoven, who helped to refine her technique and made her an oil portrait. In the same city she met and became friends with Maria Lavinia Fiorilli, a brilliant Roman etcher. And in those years she also met and made friends with Juana Romani, who gave her a lovely self-portrait.

Photo: Miss Reeder's Portrait (“Fotografia Reali”, Florence, 1917, 8.2 x 5.3 in).

So, she participated in many exposures of that time: indeed, in 1913 her presence was attested in the catalogue of works admitted to the "2ª Esposizione Internazionale Femminile di Belle Arti", promoted by the magazine "La Donna", and held at Palazzo Stabile del Valentino (Turin, Italy, 22 May-30 June). Later, the "Società di Belle Arti in Firenze" declared that she was worthy of the Great Silver Medal for the "Esposizione del Soldato" of May 1917 at Palazzo Davanzati, event in which she had been able to attend because serving in the Italian Red Cross; even Amy Allemand Bernardy, writer on Italian migrations, art expert and journalist of the fortnightly Turin magazine "La Donna", already mentioned, reported about those days in an article wholly Italian-American artist. At the same time she became a disciple of Vincenzo Gemito in Naples. There she was betrothed to nobleman Cappabianca, but the marriage was canceled cause of the outbreak of the First World War. Between the late Twenties and early Thirties, Miss Colosimo was teacher of tempera paint to the Extension courses in Florence of the School of Fine Arts and Crafts in Boston, that offered job to a group of teachers specially chosen by the director of studies Katherine B. Child. The last decades of her life were passed to live and devote herself to the ancient art of embroidery in her Florentine little villa of Via del Ronco 10; however, there was interesting correspondence (1956–59) with her inseparable friend Nancy Cox-McCormack Cushman, popular American sculptor and writer.

== Death ==
Miss Colosimo died on 25 April 1972 in Florence, at the age of 93, after a long period of infirmity at her new residence. Her funeral was held a day later in the "Chiesa di Santa Maria Madre delle Grazie" in the Isolotto District and was buried in Trespiano Cemetery.

== Humanitarian work ==
Her passion for art and her high social status did not prevent own humanitarian work. Indeed, during World War I (1914-1918), Miss Colosimo had served for six years in the Italian Red Cross, to the so-called "Auxiliary Services" of the Royal Italian Army. So, helped financially by two American sisters Margaret Graves Mather and Carol Arms Mather, she had the idea of providing for physically, morally and economically to support of several dozen of blind and maimed soldiers, who were just returned from the trenches. In addition, through the activity of the Florentine institution named "Comitato Pro-Case" (founded by herself after WWI), Miss Colosimo began a fundraise, both Italian and international (especially through the American Permanent Blind Relief War Fund of George Alexander Kessler), to help the soldiers most unfortunate and needy through the purchase of a dwelling in their native country. For this reason, as early as July 1922 some blind and maimed had enjoyed a new home through the valuable work of this committee.

As part of the Italian celebrations of the First World War Centenary, in the Tuscan exhibition "La Grande Guerra. La memoria, la storia e gli orrori del conflitto" (February–April, 2015) some unpublished photos taken from the Archives of "Ufficio Storico Provinciale" of Italian Red Cross and from the Archive Natiello-Colosimo (collection of documents belonged to Miss Colosimo), entitled "The true face of War", were put on display.

== Well-known exhibitions ==
- Salmagundi Members' Exhibitions, (Salmagundi Club, the first clubroom being at the corner of Seventeenth and G Streets, the club has its spring and fall exhibitions), Washington (D.C.), US, 1898.
- Salmagundi Members' Exhibition, (Salmagundi Club, 1710 Pennsylvania Avenue, 29 May and following days), Washington (D.C.), US, 1899.
- Salmagundi Members' Exhibition, (Salmagundi Club, DAR building, Seventeenth Street, 10 June and following days), Washington (D.C.), US, 1900.
- Exhibition of Paintings by the Artists of Washington, Held under the Auspices of a Committee of Ladies, of Which Mrs. John B. Henderson Was Chairman, (Corcoran Gallery of Art, 4–21 May), Washington (D.C.), US, 1900.
- Exhibition of Paintings and Drawings Done in Class by The Pupils of Mr. Howard Helmick, (Veerhoff's Galleries, 29 May and following days), Washington (D.C.), US, 1901.
- LXI Esposizione Annuale dell'anno 1908, (Società delle Belle Arti in Firenze, 15 March-7 June), Florence, Italy, 1908.
- LXXIX Esposizione Internazionale di Belle Arti, (Società degli Amatori e Cultori delle Belle Arti in Roma, 1 February-30 June), Tip. Dell'unione Coop. Editrice, Rome, Italy, 1909.
- LXII Esposizione Annuale dell'anno 1909, (Società delle Belle Arti in Firenze, 28 March-6 June), Florence, Italy, 1909.
- Esposizione Internazionale di Pittura, Scultura, Architettura e Bianco e Nero. 2ª edizione, (Società delle Belle Arti in Firenze, 30 March-30 June), Florence, Italy, 1913.
- 2ª Esposizione Internazionale Femminile di Belle Arti, (Promoted by the magazine "La Donna", Palazzo Stabile del Valentino, 22 May-30 June), Turin, Italy, 1913.
- 2ª Esposizione Invernale Toscana, (Società delle Belle Arti in Firenze, December 1915-January 1916), Florence, Italy, 1915.
- Esposizione del Soldato, (Società delle Belle Arti in Firenze, Palazzo Davanzati, March–April), Florence, Italy, 1917.
- Vendita di opere e oggetti a Beneficio dei Fratelli profughi, (Società delle Belle Arti in Firenze, 20, 21 and 22 December), Florence, Italy, 1917.
- 1ª Esposizione Biennale Nazionale d'Arte della Città di Napoli, (Palazzo Reale, May–October), Naples, Italy, 1921.
- One of her works is currently exhibited at the Vittoriale degli Italiani, and it will be there until September 2026.
- One of her paintings and some photographs were exhibited at the Modern Art Gallery of Palazzo Pitti, one of the museums housed in Palazzo Pitti in Florence, and they were there until May 26, 2019. Later that painting was purchased on September 16, 2020 from the Uffizi Gallery.
