= James Duncan Hague =

19th century American geologist and mining engineer

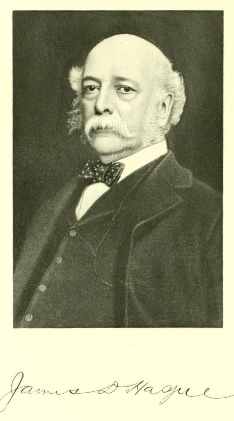
- Born: February 24, 1836; Boston, Massachusetts
- Died: August 3, 1908 (aged 72); Stockbridge, Massachusetts
- Resting place: Albany Rural Cemetery; Colonie, New York
- Education: Harvard University; Georg-August University of Göttingen; Royal Saxon Mining Academy
- Occupation: Mining engineer
- Spouse: Mary Ward Foote (m. 1872; died 1898)
- Children: Marian Hague; Eleanor Hague; William Hague

James Duncan Hague (1836 – 1908) was an American mining engineer, mineralogist, and geologist.

== Early years ==
Hague was born in Boston, Massachusetts, to the Rev. William Hague and Mary Bowditch Moriarty. He attended school in Boston and Newark, New Jersey, before enrolling at the Lawrence Scientific School at Harvard University in 1854. The following year, he headed to the Georg-August University of Göttingen in Germany to study chemistry and mineralogy for a year before studying mining engineering at the Royal Saxon Mining Academy in Freiberg for two years.

== Career ==
After returning to New York, Hague was selected by financier William H. Webb to explore several equatorial coral islands in the Pacific Ocean. Webb was involved in the guano business, and Hague examined and documented phosphate deposits on Baker, Howland, and Jarvis Islands.

During the American Civil War, he spent 1862 and 1863 in Port Royal, South Carolina, as a judge advocate for the U.S. Navy, handling negotiations involving the Atlantic Blockading Squadron. He then worked for Edwin J. Hulbert, developing the Calumet and Hecla copper mines in Michigan, before joining Clarence King in 1867 as an assistant geologist on the Geological Exploration of the Fortieth Parallel.

In 1871, he headed to California to work as a consulting expert on mining engineering, working with both private and governmental clients throughout the western U.S. and Mexico. In 1878, he was a member of the U.S. delegation to the Exposition Universelle in Paris, writing a report on the mining companies and innovations on display.

In 1887, Hague acquired the North Star Mining Co. on Lafayette Hill near Grass Valley, California, which he had helped develop during his time in the state. He reorganized the company in 1889 and acquired several other mines, including Gold Hill. Working with his brother-in-law, Arthur De Wint Foote, he grew North Star's operations, eventually deciding to commission North Star House as an event space for the company and home for the company's supervisor, Foote.

== Affiliations ==
Hague was a fellow of the American Association for the Advancement of Science and in 1904 he became a member of the American Academy of Arts and Sciences. From 1906, Hague was vice president of the American Institute of Mining Engineers. In 1887, he became a fellow of the American Geographical Society before becoming a councillor in 1907 and the society's vice president a year later.

== Personal life ==
In April 1872, Hague married Mary Ward Foote (1846 – 1898). They had three children: Marian (1873 – 1971), Eleanor (1875 – 1954), and William (1882 – 1918). He died August 3, 1908, at his summer home in Stockbridge, Massachusetts, and was buried in Albany Rural Cemetery in Colonie, New York.
