= Kate Foote Coe =

American educator, journalist, and traveler (1840–1923)

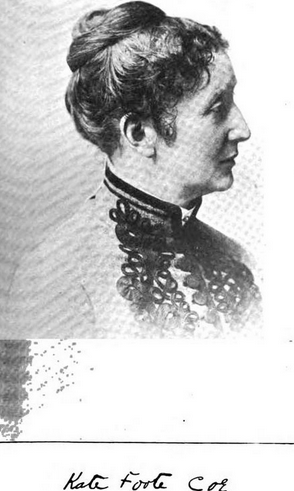
Kate Foote Coe, from a 1906 publication.

Katherine Elizabeth Foote Coe (May 31, 1840 – December 23, 1923) was an American educator, journalist, and traveler from Connecticut.

== Early life ==
Foote was born in Guilford, Connecticut, one of the ten children of George Augustus Foote and Eliza Spencer Foote. George Foote's sister Roxana was the first wife of Lyman Beecher, so Kate and her siblings were the first cousins of Roxana Foote Beecher's children, including Harriet Beecher Stowe, Henry Ward Beecher, Charles Beecher, Edward Beecher, and Catharine Beecher. Kate's older sister Harriet Ward Foote married General Joseph Roswell Hawley, governor of Connecticut and United States senator.

== Career ==
Foote taught at Hartford Female Seminary as a young woman. In 1863, she and her sister Harriet went to South Carolina and Florida with the New England Freedmen's Aid Society, to teach former slaves during the American Civil War. In 1872 she spent a year in Europe. When her sister Harriet died in 1886, Foote took over her position as president of the Women's National Indian Association from 1886 to 1895, traveling in the American west and advocating for the establishment of Indian schools and hospitals. In 1886 she went to Alaska with Alice Cunningham Fletcher and Sheldon Jackson to study the educational needs of Alaska natives. She then traveled to Japan with Emmeline Beach, daughter of Moses Yale Beach, to learn about women's lives there.

Foote also wrote for magazines and newspapers. She was the Washington correspondent for the Independent for fifteen years (succeeding Mary C. Ames), and a contributor to Century magazine and St. Nicholas magazine. She reported on Persian cats and on varying opinions of the Washington Monument, among other topics. She also co-wrote a biography of her sister Harriet with their friend Maria Huntington.

As a clubwoman, Foote was a charter member of the Washington D. C. chapter of the Daughters of the American Revolution, and head of the Meriden chapter of the same organization.

Some Chilkat woven blankets Kate Foote Coe acquired in or from Alaska were donated to the Peabody Museum of Natural History at Yale University. In 2011, the museum made plans to repatriate one of the blankets, which was determined to have been removed from a "funerary context." Coe also donated baskets that she acquired in Japan and India to the Peabody.

== Personal life ==
Foote married Andrew J. Coe, a judge, in 1895. They spent the first few months of their marriage in Venezuela, where Andrew was trying to recover his health. She was widowed when Judge Coe died two years later in 1897. In widowhood she lived with her younger sister, Elizabeth Foote Jenkins, in New Haven, Connecticut. Kate Foote Coe died in 1923, aged 83 years.

Her niece Margaret Foote Hawley was an artist who specialized in portrait miniatures.
