= Anne Winship Bates Leach =

American heiress

- Leach in The Atlanta Constitution in 1916
- Born: Anne Winship Bates; December 31, 1896; Atlanta, Georgia, U.S.
- Died: February 14, 1977 (aged 80); Palm Beach County, Florida, U.S.
- Resting place: Oakland Cemetery
- Education: Fairmont Seminary
- Occupations: socialite philanthropist
- Spouse: Willaford Ransom Leach
- Children: 4

Anne Winship Bates Leach (December 31, 1896 – February 14, 1977) was an American heiress, socialite, and philanthropist. She was a prominent member of the Southern Dames of America and a benefactor of the Bascom Palmer Eye Institute. Leach and her husband built the Tuckahoe estate in Jensen Beach, Florida.

== Early life ==
Leach was born Anne Winship Bates in 1896 into a prominent Atlanta family. She was an heiress to the Coca-Cola fortune.

She attended Fairmont Seminary in Washington, D.C.

== Social and philanthropic endeavors ==
Leach was a prominent socialite in Palm Beach.

She founded the Garden Club of Stuart, Florida. She was a member of the Southern Dames of America. After donating $2,500,00 to the Bascom Palmer Eye Institute, she was granted a lifetime membership in Southern Dames. The Bascom Palmer Eye Institute named the Anne Bates Leach Eye Hospital in Miami after her.

In 1973, she and her husband donated $300,000 to build a women's residence at 901 S. Olive Avenue.

== Personal life ==
She was married to businessman Willaford Ransom Leach. In 1938, they had the Tuckahoe Mansion built in Jensen Beach, Florida.
