= Bascom Palmer Eye Institute =

Geography
- Location: Miami, Florida, U.S.
- Coordinates: 25°47′27.72″N 80°12′38.25″W

Organisation
- Type: Teaching
- Affiliated university: University of Miami; Miller School of Medicine

Services
- Beds: 56
- Speciality: Ophthalmology

History
- Founded: January 20, 1962

Links
- Website: bascompalmer.org
- Lists: Hospitals in U.S.

Bascom Palmer Eye Institute is the University of Miami School of Medicine's ophthalmic care, research, and education center. The institute is based in the Health District of Miami, Florida, and has been ranked consistently as the best eye hospital and vision research center in the nation.

Bascom Palmer Eye Institute faculty and staff treat patients from around the world at the institute's multi-location facilities, including its flagship location in Miami and at satellite facilities elsewhere in Miami-Dade County, Broward County, Palm Beach County, and Collier County in South Florida.

The institute's clinical faculty treats more than 250,000 patients annually, provides 24-hour emergency care, and is the only community-based ophthalmic care center for indigent and low-income patients of Miami-Dade County.

== History ==
Ophthalmology at the University of Miami School of Medicine began in 1955 and attained departmental status in 1959.

Bascom Palmer Eye Institute was founded seven years later, on January 20, 1962, by Edward W. D. Norton, a neuro-ophthalmologist, retinal specialist, administrator and professor who joined the University of Miami's School of Medicine with aspirations of building a regional ophthalmic center in South Florida. The institute was named after Bascom H. Palmer, a Miami ophthalmologist who settled in Miami in the 1920s.

The Bascom Palmer Eye Institute's founding five physicians, including Norton, Victor Curtin, the first faculty member, who was hired in 1959 and established the institute's pathology laboratory and its eye bank, which has provided ophthalmologists with donor eye tissue for more than 30,000 patients since its 1962 founding, J. Lawton Smith, a neuro-ophthalmologist, who created the nation's first post-graduate neuro-ophthalmology course, J. Donald M. Gass, a macular degeneration specialist who developed fluorescein angiography as a diagnostic tool, and John T. Flynn, a pediatric ophthalmologist who established the institute's Children's Clinic. The institute was officially opened on January 20, 1962.

John Clarkson, a vitreoretinal specialist and surgeon, succeeded Norton in 1991 and chaired the institute until 1996. Richard Parrish, a glaucoma specialist, became the institute's third chairman in 1996 and served for three years. Richard Forster, a cornea and external disease specialist, served as interim chairman from 1999 until 2001. Carmen A. Puliafito, a vitreoretinal specialist and surgeon, was appointed chairman of the institute and medical director of the Anne Bates Leach Eye Hospital in July 2001, serving until October 2007.

Eduardo C. Alfonso, a cornea and external disease specialist, is Bascom Palmer Eye Institute's present chairman and has served in that capacity since June 2009.

== Medical firsts ==
- In 1965, Bascom Palmer physicians Noble J. David, J. Lawton Smith, Edward W. D. Norton, J. Donald M. Gass, and medical photographer Johnny Justice, Jr. pioneered the use of fluorescein angiography for the diagnosis of macular and retinal diseases, which led to the accurate description and effective treatment of retinal disorders.
- In 1971, Bascom Palmer research investigators established the clinical value of vitrectomy (removal of the vitreous humor) to treat retinal detachments, diabetic retinopathy, infectious diseases of the eye, and severe ocular trauma.
- In 1989, in a successful effort to restore the vitality to ocular mucous membranes, Bascom Palmer faculty introduced limbal stem cell transplantation therapy, which now can prevent potentially blinding corneal scarring. Also in 1989, Bascom Palmer researchers identified the herpes virus as the cause of acute retinal necrosis, a devastating infection of the retina often caused by HIV/AIDS.
- In 1995, Bascom Palmer faculty member Robert H. Machemer conducted the first successful vitreous surgery and invented the miniature surgical instrumentation used in this procedure.
- In 2006, Bascom Palmer physicians and scientists pioneered studies into the effective treatment of the wet form of age-related macular degeneration, using the FDA-approved colorectal cancer drug Bevacizumab.
- In 2009, Bascom Palmer surgeons performed the first modified osteo-odonto-keratoprosthesis surgery in the United States, restoring vision to a woman who had been blind for nine years. The procedure involved several surgeries culminating with implanting her tooth in her eye as a base to hold a prosthetic lens.

== Services ==
The institute provides 24-hour emergency care and is the only community-based ophthalmic care center for indigent and low-income patients Miami-Dade County. Faculty and staff treat patients with most eye disorders and diseases, including:

- Retina and vitreous diseases and surgery
- Glaucoma
- Corneal and external diseases
- Laser vision center treatments
- Neuro-ophthalmology
- Ophthalmic oncology
- Ophthalmic plastic and orbital surgery
- Pediatric ophthalmology
- Ophthalmic pathology
- Uveitis
- Comprehensive ophthalmology
- 24-hour emergency in Miami
- Optical services
- Contact lens service
- Low vision rehabilitation

== Rankings ==
In 2020, U.S. News & World Report ranked Bascom Palmer Eye Institute the best ophthalmology hospital and research center in the United States for the 17th consecutive year and 19th year overall since the institute's 1962 founding.
