= Mary Foote =

American painter (1872–1968)

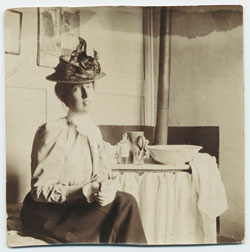
- Born: November 25, 1872
- Died: January 28, 1968 (aged 95); Guilford, Connecticut, US
- Resting place: Foote-Ward Cemetery, Guilford, Connecticut; 41°18′31.9″N 72°40′17.1″W
- Education: Yale School of Art
- Awards: Alice Kimball English prize, William Wirt Winchester prize

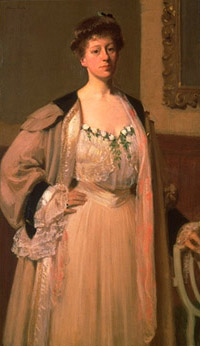
Mary Foote, Portrait of Mrs. Wilfred Worcester, oil on canvas, 50.5 x 30 inches, c. 1898–1901

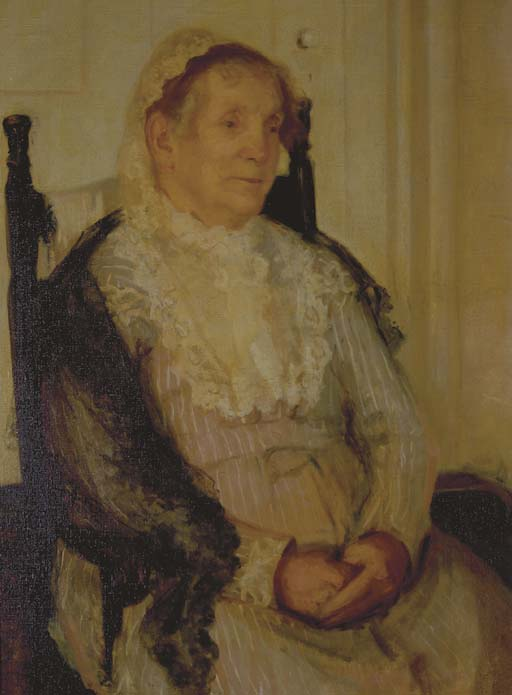
Mary Foote, Old Lady, 1913 Armory Show

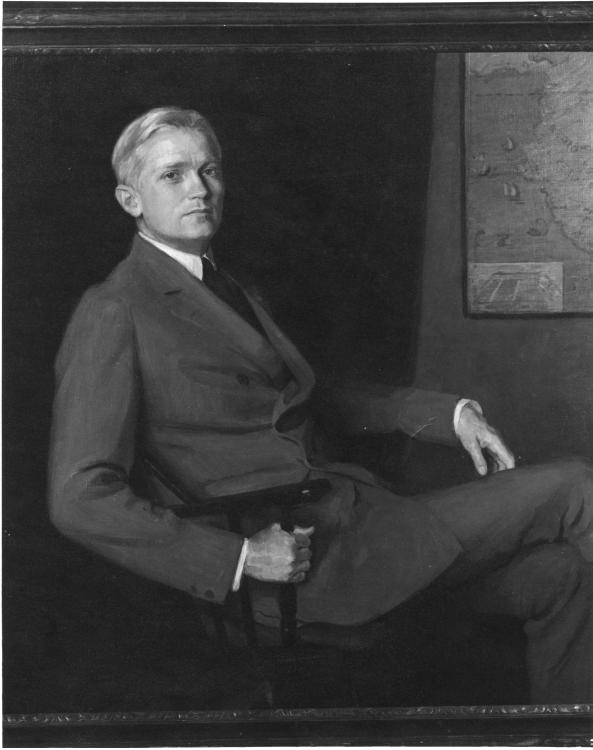
Mary Foote, Portrait of Hiram Bingham III, 1921

Mary Foote (November 25, 1872 – January 28, 1968) was an American painter and producer of notes of Carl Jung's seminars. As an artist, she lived and worked in New York's Washington Square, Paris and Peking. From 1928 to the 1950s she lived in Zürich and created and published notes of Carl Jung's seminars until World War II. She returned to the United States in the 1950s and spent her later years in Connecticut, where she died.

== Early life ==
Mary Foote was the daughter of Charles Spencer Foote and Hannah Hubbard Foote. She was born in Guilford, Connecticut, as was her younger sister, Margaret Foote Hawley, who also became an artist and painted a profile portrait of a girl named Mary Foote. After the girls were orphaned, Margaret was raised by her aunt, Harriet Foote Hawley and her husband in Washington, D.C. Mary was taken in by an aunt who lived in Hartford, Connecticut after she became an orphan at the age of 13.

Her cousin was Lilly Gillette Foote, who was governess to Mark Twain's children. For a period of time Mary Foote lived in the Mark Twain (Samuel L. Clemens) household and was friends with Susy Clemens.

Mary Foote was a member of the Daughters of the American Revolution, the great-great-granddaughter of General Andrew Ward (1727-1799) and Diana Hubbard Ward. Ward, who was born and died in Guilford, Connecticut, was commended for his bravery by George Washington. Foote's grandparents were George Augustus Foote and Eliza Spencer and her great-grandparents were Eli Foote and Diana Ward.

== Career ==
=== Art ===
Beginning in 1890, she studied art at Yale School of Art. In 1894, the Alice Kimball English Prize, which was established to support summer travel, was awarded to Foote. The William Wirt Winchester Prize, which funded two years of study in Europe, was awarded to Foote in 1897; It was considered the "largest prize of its kind" in the United States at that time. Foote travelled to Paris, France and studied with John Singer Sargent. She was a student of Frederick MacMonnies at the Académie Carmen in Paris and at Giverny; the gardens there became the subject of many of her paintings. She also made a portrait painting of MacMonnies. Her friends included art patron Mabel Dodge, dancer Isadora Duncan, author Henry James, writer Gertrude Stein, James McNeill Whistler, Ellen Emmet Rand, and Cecilia Beaux.

In 1901, she returned to New York City to set up a studio on Washington Square where she earned a comfortable living from her portrait commissions; her list of clients reads as a Who's Who of the art scene of her day. Foote painted a wide range of subjects including portraits, figures, florals, and landscapes.

Her work was exhibited at the Pennsylvania Academy of Fine Arts, along with the works of Robert Henri, Cecilia Beaux, Edmund Tarbell and other noted artists. Her work was described as follows:

Mary Foote sent some fine canvases, of which the most striking, perhaps, was that of Mrs. John Carpenter-an exceedingly skilful management of a blue hat and a red coat, with well considered "repeat" accents in the book and cup and saucer upon the table. Her portrait of Mrs. Hermann Kobbe also showed a fine and subtle modeling, and the color value of the pink necklace in relation to the peculiar flesh tints of the subject was happily expressed.

At the Armory Show in 1913, she exhibited Old Lady.

Foote lived and worked in Peking, China from December 1926 into early 1927.

During the 1920s, she shared her studio and had a relationship with Frederick MacMonnies. She went into a deep depression after it ended. She sought treatment from Smith Ely Jelliffe, and in 1927, closed down her studio. One of her friends, Robert Edmond Jones, a stage designer in New York, had been a analysand of Carl Jung and Toni Wolff. He advised Foote, who has been described as neurotic, to seek the treatment of Jung in Zürich, Switzerland.

=== Carl Jung ===
After closing her studio, Foote went to Zürich to see Swiss psychoanalyst Carl Jung. Beginning in 1928, she worked for Jung, first transcribing his seminars and editing Jung's English phrasing, and then producing the bound copies for their participants. For instance, her notes became the basis for The Visions Seminars, which was published in 1976. Her secretary and assistant from the 1930s until the seminar series ended with the start of World War II was an Englishwoman, Mrs. Emily Köppel, who was married to a man from Switzerland. The work was paid for by subscriptions, and supplemented initially by Mary Foote, and later by Mary and Paul Mellon and Alice Lewisohn Crowley.

In the 1930s, Foote had a secret liaison with Harvard-educated German businessman and Nazi, Ernst Hanfstaengl. She returned to Connecticut shortly before her death; her obituary listed her as having been Jung's "secretary."

She was among the social circle of Mabel Dodge Luhan and visited her at her Villa Curonia. A fellow friend, Muriel Draper, said of Foote:

I cannot conceive of more conflicting psychological elements meeting under similar conditions without explosion. Almost everyone was in love or hate and only Mary Foote could come cutting through the snarled air like a cool smooth silver fruit-knife, severing at the crucial moments the crossed threads that were in danger of becoming firmly knotted entanglements.

She was also described as a tall, elegant woman. Mary Mellon, wife of Paul Mellon, said of her, "She has great style. From her you will learn about the feeling relationships among people there. She is very frail, and I'm afraid not very well. Take her to dinner at the Baur-au-Lac and feed her on champagne and caviar."

== Later years and death ==
In the 1950s, Foote returned to Connecticut. She died among friends on January 28, 1968, and is buried in the Foote-Ward Cemetery in Guilford, Connecticut. Her papers are with the Yale University Library.

== Works ==
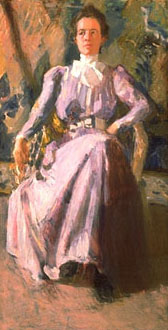
Mary Foote, Lady in Lavender, oil on canvas, 30 x 16 inches, c. 1898–1901

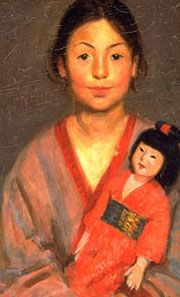
Mary Foote, Oriental Girl with Doll, oil on canvas, 21.5 x 13.25 inches, c. 1898–1901

- August Florian Jaccaci, oil, Century Association 7, New York
- Augustus Saint-Gaudens, oil, National Academy of Design
- Carrie Chapman Catt (1859-1947), oil on canvas, 1927, Smithsonian Institution National Portrait Gallery
- Floral Still Life, oil, Lagakos-Turak Gallery, Philadelphia, Pennsylvania in 1987
- Frederick MacMonnies, made by 1905
- Girl and Reflection, oil on canvas
- John Crosby Brown, 1914, Chamber of Commerce of the State of New York
- Jose Santo and Mother, oil on canvas, Smithsonian Institution National Museum of the American Indian
- Lady in Lavender, oil, c. 1898-1901
- Mabel Dodge Luhan, oil on canvas, Yale University
- Naiad, Paris, oil on canvas
- Oriental Girl with Doll, oil on canvas, c. 1898-1901
- Paul Draper
- Portrait of Mrs. Wilfred Worcester, oil on canvas, c. 1898-1901
- Rio Grande Woman, oil on canvas, c. 1920, National Museum of the American Indian. Made in New Mexico.
- Ruth Dana Draper (1850-1914), oil on canvas, c. 1910, She was the wife of William H. Draper.
- Ruth Draper (1884-1956), oil on canvas, Smithsonian Institution National Portrait Gallery. She was an actress.
- Taos Man, oil on canvas, c. 1920, National Museum of the American Indian. Made in New Mexico.
- Thomas Hastings, oil, National Academy of Design
- William H. Dunwoody, oil on canvas, 1913, Minnesota Historical Society, St. Paul, Minnesota
