= Howard Helmick =

American painter (1840–1907)

- Born: May 10, 1840; Zanesville, Ohio, USA
- Died: April 28, 1907 (aged 66); Washington D.C., USA
- Occupation: Painter

Howard Helmick (May 10, 1840 – April 28, 1907) was an American painter, etcher, designer and illustrator, who was well known for his oil on canvas paintings. He specialized in figure painting and engravings. He was best known for his Irish genre studies, and paintings of Irish households.

== Early life ==
Helmick was born in Zanesville, Ohio, in 1840. He studied at the Pennsylvania Academy of the Fine Arts under Peter Rothermel. He then moved to Paris in 1854 and trained alongside Henry Bacon at the École des Beaux-Arts in Paris, under the artist Alexandre Cabanel. "He devoted himself to genre painting, using as topics for his greatest works the scenes from peasant life of Ireland. In this particular style of work he became famous. He gained admission to the Beaux Arts, the most famous school of art in Paris, being the second foreigner who was ever received there". He also presented his paintings at the Paris Salon. He then moved to London in 1872.

== Life in London ==
Helmick lived in London for 15 years, from 1872 to 1887. He would regularly visit Ireland to make paintings on rural Irish life, and Irish households, from his studios at the counties Cork and Galway. Throughout his stretch in London, he repeatedly exhibited in a number of Art societies, such as London's Royal Academy, the Royal Institute of Oil Painters, the Royal Society of Painters-Etchers and Engravers, the Society of British Artists, and the Royal Society of Artists in Birmingham. He also exhibited his works at the Glasgow Institute of the Fine Arts, the Royal Hibernian Academy, the Walker Art Gallery in Liverpool and Manchester City Art Gallery. Thus, he became established as a painter and etcher and was elected a member of Society of British Artists in 1879, and the Royal Society of Painters-Etchers and Engravers in 1881.

In London, Helmick became friendly with the famous painter James Whistler, who was the president of the Society of British Artists. Around 1880, Helmick expressed his appreciation for Whistler's works, like his Etchings of Venice and Venice Pastels, both exhibited at the Fine Art Society, London. In 1878, James Whistler had created his Arrangement in Grey and Black, No. 2: Portrait of Thomas Carlyle, engraved by Richard Josey. In 1881, a set of 'Six portraits of T. Carlyle', etched in a rather naive style by Helmick, were published by the Etcher's Society in Arundell Street, Haymarket. Helmick and Whistler's mutual interests and involvements in such etchings, and print publications, provided them with points of contact and likely brought them together. Their friendship was strong enough for Whistler to suggest that Helmick live in the same building as him, on Tite Street, in 1881. Helmick's friendship with Whistler increased his fame, and his paintings would demand high prices at London's Royal Academy.

== Life in Washington, D.C. ==
Helmick moved to Washington, D.C., in 1887. There he was active in the Society of Washington Artists, the Washington Water Color Club and the Washington Society of Fine Arts. As a Professor of the Philosophy and History of Art, Helmick taught painting and drawing at the Art Students League of Washington, at Georgetown University and in his Georgetown studio. He simultaneously exhibited at the national Academy of Design, the Art Institute of Chicago and the Brooklyn Art Association. He was even represented at the Paris Exposition of 1900. Helmick also contributed illustrations to The Century Magazine and Harper’s Magazine and is represented in the Corcoran Gallery of Art and the National Museum of American Art. Starting from May 29, 1901, and following days, a collection of paintings and drawings made by his students of the private class, both male and female, which he directed in own home in Georgetown, was exhibited in the Veerhoff's Galleries (Washington, D.C.); with regard to this exhibit, Misses K. Lewars, R. McGowan and Candida Colosimo showed all their talent.

Also among Helmick's pupils was the noted miniaturist Margaret Foote Hawley.

== Death ==
Helmick died at his residence, 3259 N Street NW, after a long period of ill health on 28 April 1907 in Georgetown, Washington, D.C., at the age of 66. His funeral was held two days later in the Holy Trinity Catholic Church (Washington, D.C.) and he was buried in Glenwood Cemetery (Washington, D.C.).

== Style and technique ==
Helmick was best known for his oil on canvas paintings that were based on rural Irish life. He developed this preference from his regular visits to Ireland, when living in London. He was the foremost artist among a small set of painters focusing on rural Irish culture, and was hailed by contemporary critics as ‘an American Wilkie’. His surviving paintings on the Catholic peasantry, their households, priests, doctors, and the arrangement of their marriages give an insight into his sympathetic and realistic attitude and viewpoint. His paintings tended to be intricately detailed when depicting the items lying around Irish households, such as the cutlery, the crockery and the flax spinning wheels. These demonstrated his keen observational skills.

== Gallery ==
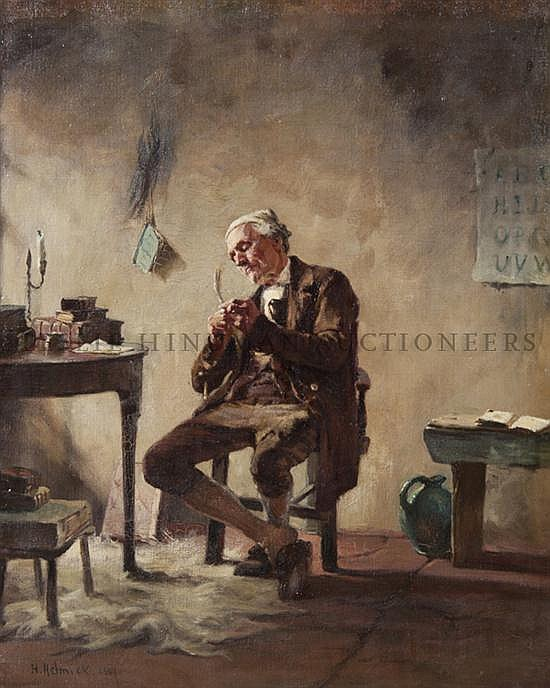
Village Schoolmaster

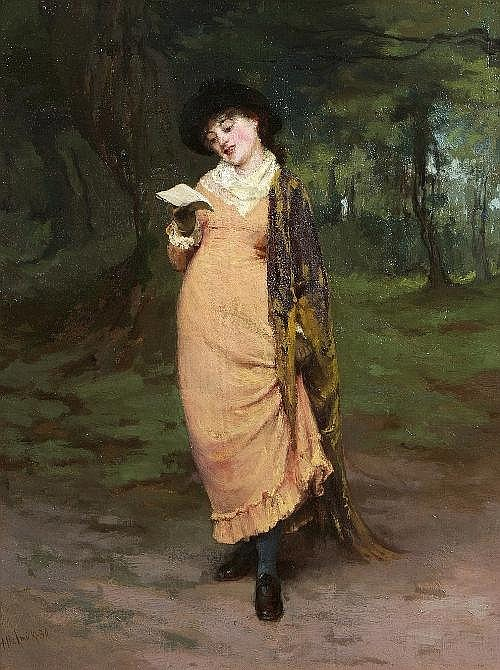
The Love Letter

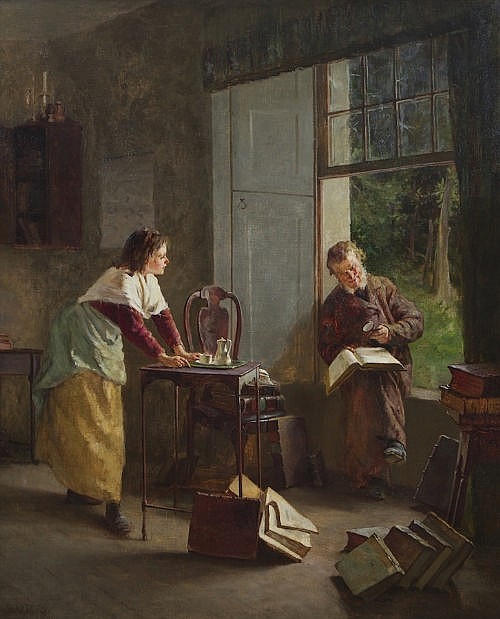
The Bibliophile

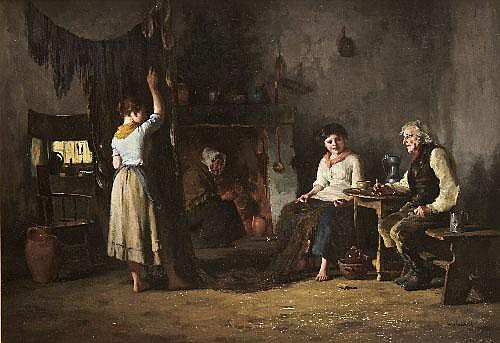
Mending the Nets

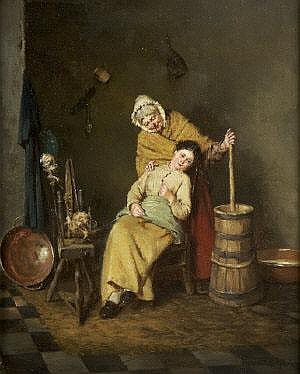
Her First Love

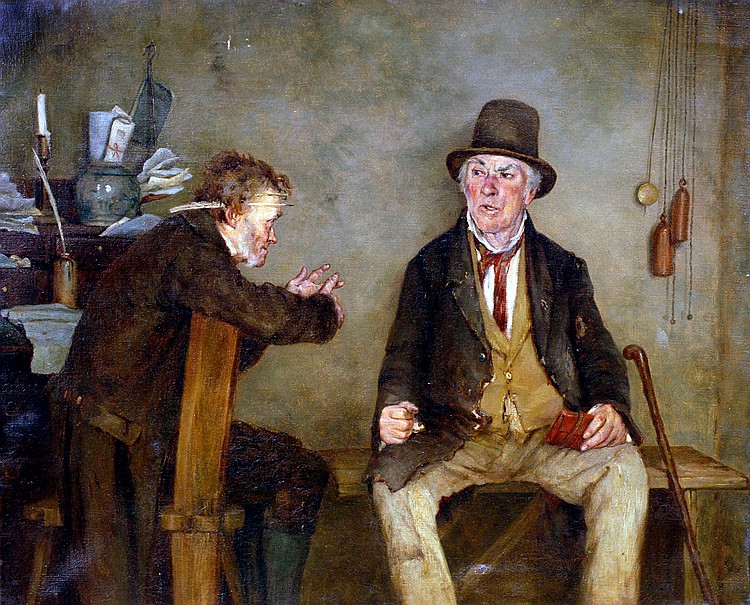
Discussions of a Financial Nature

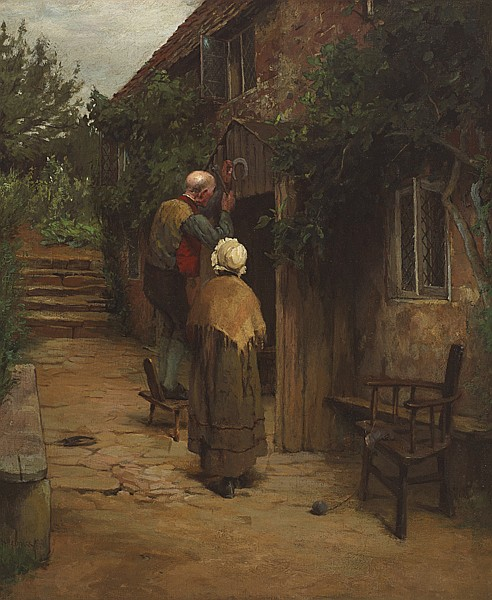
Against Witches

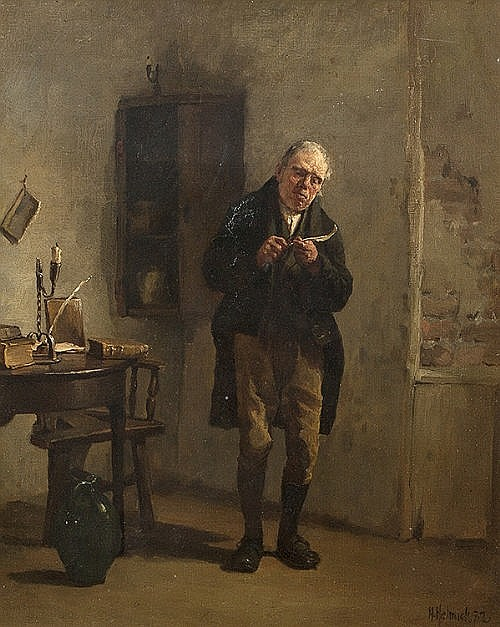
A faulty quill
