= Bascom H. Palmer =

Politician and ophthalmologist from Florida

Bascom Headon Palmer Sr. (? - April 2, 1916) was a state legislator and judge in Florida. A Democrat, he represented Columbia County, Florida in the Florida House of Representatives in 1885. He then represented the 14th District in the Florida Senate from 1895 to 1901. In 1901 he was appointed a judge.

He had two sons. His namesake son was a doctor in the military. He became a prominent ophthalmologist. The Bascom Palmer Eye Institute is named for him.
