= Fairmont Seminary =

Women's college and school in Washington, D.C.

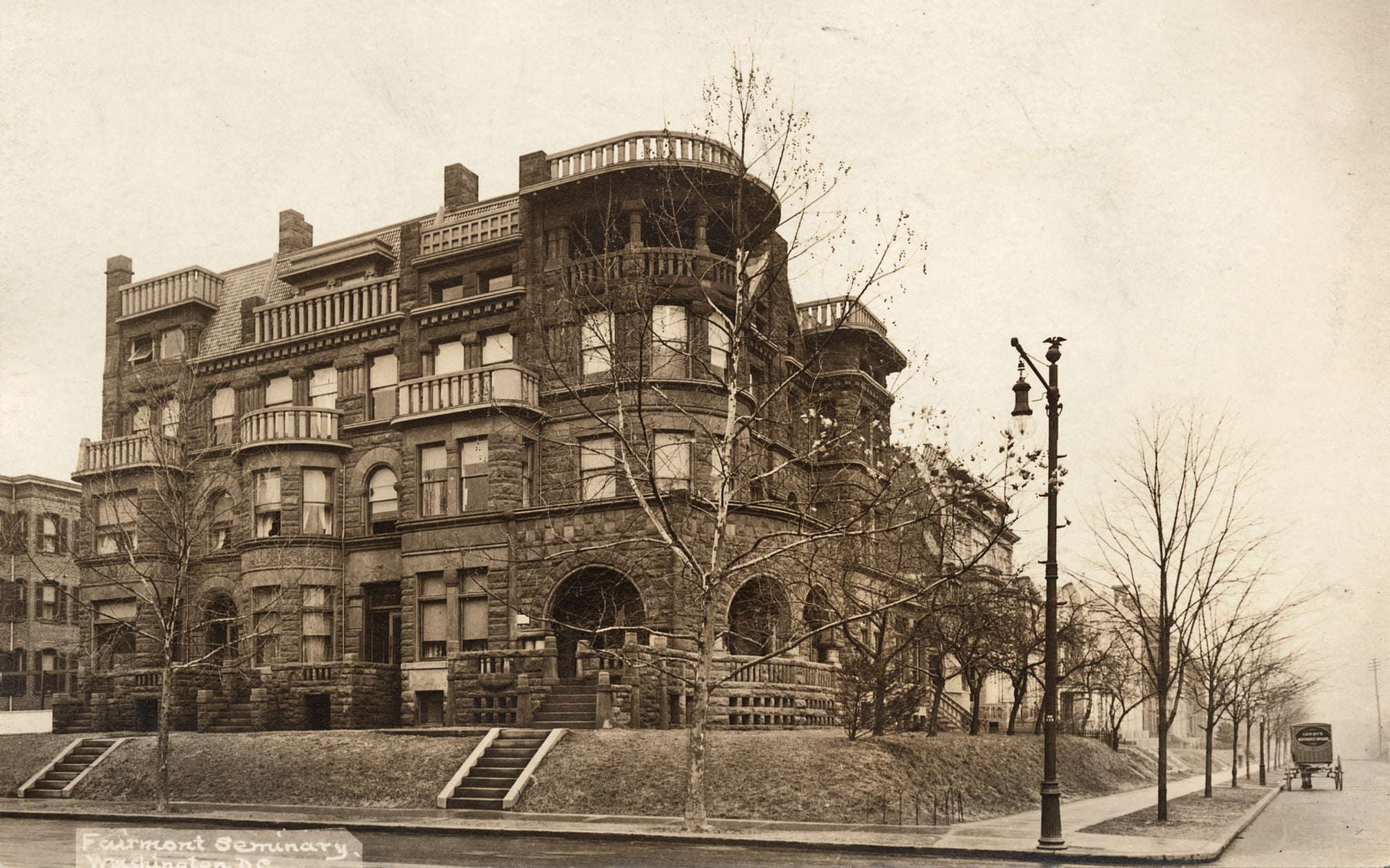
- Fairmont Seminary for Girls, 14th and Yale Streets, before1920
- Other names: Fairmont Seminary for Girls; Fairmont Junior College and Senior Preparatory School; Fairmont School and Junior College; Fairmont Junior College
- Type: Private women's
- Active: 1899–December 1942
- Location: Washington, D.C., United States

Fairmont Seminary, later called Fairmont Junior College sometimes misspelled as Fairmount Seminary, was an educational institution for women in Washington, D.C. The seminary opened in 1899. It was a boarding school that included a preparatory school (high school) and a junior college. It closed in December 1942.

== History ==
Fairmont Seminary was founded in 1899 by Dr. and Mrs. Arthur Ramsey. The couple came to Washington, D.C. to Arkansas to start a school in 1898. Dr. Ramsey was the school's principal for most of its existence. Judith Leroy Steele was the vice principal from 1900 to 1918. In 1919, Randolph L. Harlowe was the seminary's headmaster.

In 1923, Edward Louis Montgomery purchased the seminary and became its principal. He changed its name to Fairmont Junior College and Preparatory School for Girls, commonly known as Fairmont Junior College. Montgomery died in December 1929.

Maud van Woy became the college's principal around 1932 and was later its president. On November 8, 1940, van Woy purchased the John D. Rockefeller estate known as The Casements in Ormond Beach, Florida to establish a new junior college. She was the president of the new Casements Junior College and the Fairmont Junior College at the same time.

In December 1942, van Woy was sued for failure to meet a $10,000 promissory note for the Casements property, triggering a clause that required her to pay the $30,000 loan balance in full ($591,141 in today's money). Soon after, she announced the closure of Fairmont Junior College. Most of Fairmont's 100 students were absorbed by the Casements Junior College and Preparatory School.

In January 1943, the Fairmont Junior College campus was taken over by the Australian War Supplies Procurement Commission, an agency established for World War II.

== Campus ==
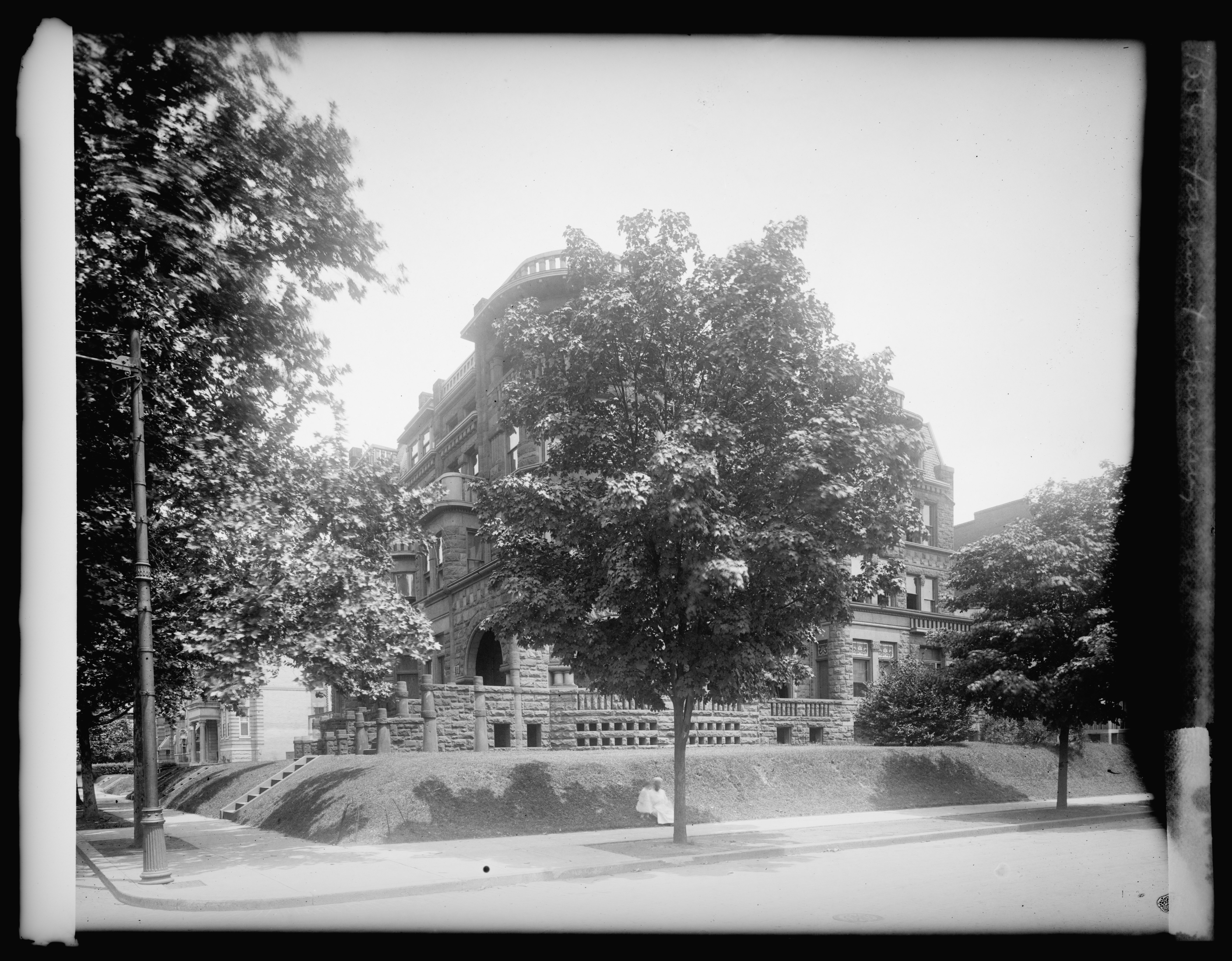
Fairmont Seminary, 14th and Yale Streets NW, between 1910 and 1926

Fairmont Seminary was originally located at 13th and Harvard Street. In 1900, it moved to 1405 Fairmont Street in the Columbia Heights neighborhood of Washington, D.C. Its building was adjacent to a playground. Later, the school moved to the former residence of Mrs. John A. Logan, located at 13th and Clifton Streets. To enhance the school reception hall, Ramsey purchased crystal chandeliers that previously hung in the White House.

The seminary was located at the northeast corner of 14th and Yale from around 1902 until 1920. In August 1903, Ramsey received a permit for an expansive renovation of properties at 2703 and 2705 14th Street NW. In October 1908, Calument Place was added as a residence for the junior college students.

In July 1920, Ramsey purchased the former Bristol School as a new campus for the seminary. This campus included a group of buildings located in the block between 19th and 20th Streets and Beltmore Road and Mintwood Place. This location featured large athletics fields and gardens and overlooked Rock Creek Park. Its central building was Collegiate Hall, which included classrooms, a library, an assembly hall, and a gymnasium. The second building, the former Waggaman home, was used as the seminary's dormitory. A newer fireproof building, Studio Hall, included the school's studio space and 65 rooms and bathrooms for students. There was also a residence for the president, formerly known as the Sands House.

Later, the junior college's address was 1711 Massachusetts Ave., on a property that the DuPont Estate owned.

== Academics ==
Fairmont Seminary issued diplomas and certificates. The seminary referred to the students in the two classes of the junior college as freshmen and seniors. The graduating class of the high school was also called seniors.

In 1904, The Washington Post described the seminary's academic program as "ample, providing practical and thorough instruction..." Courses included ancient languages, elocution, English, gymnastics, mathematics, modern languages, philosophy, physical culture, and physical sciences, along with design, drawing, piano, painting, and singing.

In 1940, classes included both finishing school and careers-based subjects, including advertising, athletics, Bible history, commercial art, costume design, current events, dancing, domestic arts, dramatic art, dramatics, English, fencing, fine arts, French, German, harp, harmony, hygiene, interior decoration, international relations, mathematics, merchandising, music theory, organ, philosophy, piano, riding, science, secretarial science, Spanish, and violin.

== Enrollment ==
Students came from various states. Between 1917 and 1919, students came from 43 states, Canada, and Mexico. In 1940, its students were from Alabama, Arkansas, California, Colorado, Connecticut, Georgia, Florida, Illinois, Indiana, Iowa, Kentucky, Massachusetts, Michigan, Mississippi, Missouri, New Jersey, New York, North Carolina, Ohio, Oklahoma, Pennsylvania, Tennessee, Texas, Virginia, Washington, D.C., and Wisconsin. In 1919, tuition was $1,000.

== Student life ==
Students participated in outdoor games. The seminary had several social sororities, including Alpha Sigma Alpha 1905 to 1908, Beta Sigma Omicron from 1904 to 1913, and Kappa Delta from 1903 to 1912. The school's yearbook was The Owl and Parrot.

Various speakers were brought to the seminary to present lectures for the students, including William Jennings Bryan and David Starr Jordan, and Wallace Radcliffe. There were also musical performances for the students, such as the local Columbia Quartet Club. Students also took trips to locations in Washington, D.C. and attended dances and other events at the U.S. Naval Academy at Annapolis, Maryland.

== Athletics ==
The Fairmont Seminary fencers competed with other schools, including George Washington University. The seminary had an inter-team basketball league in 1928; there were four teams named after Native American tribes.

== Notable people ==
=== Alumnae ===
- Agnes von Kurowsky, nurse who inspired the character "Catherine Barkley" in Ernest Hemingway's 1929 novel A Farewell to Arms
- Anne Winship Bates Leach, heiress and philanthropist

=== Faculty ===
- Candida Colosimo, artist
- Pauline Frederick, taught from 1933 to 1934, journalist

== See also ==
- List of women's universities and colleges in the United States
