= Alameda Terminal =

Railroad station and wharf in Alameda, California

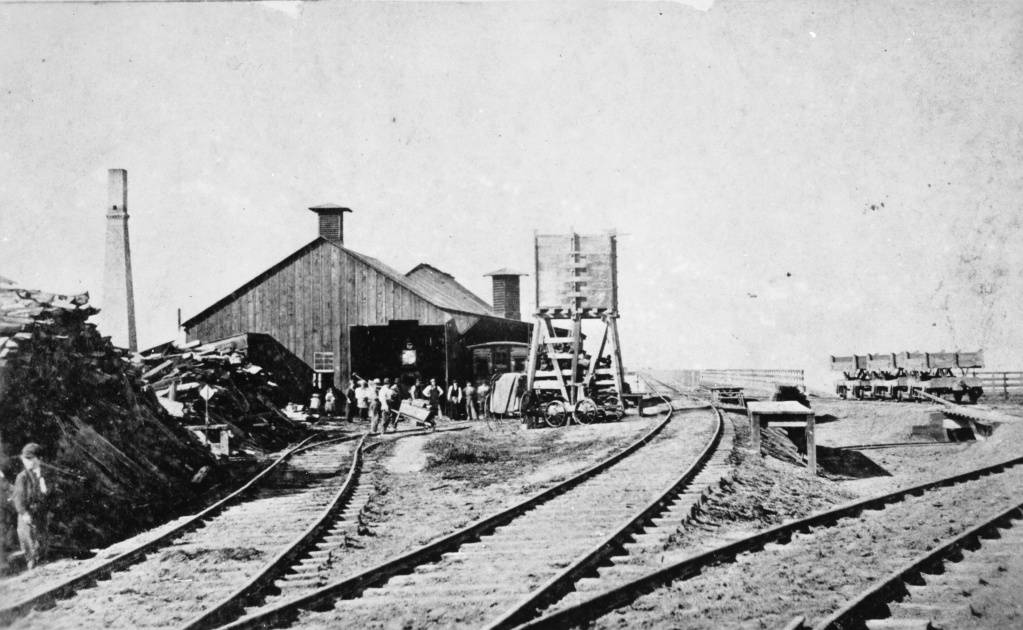
- Alameda Terminal, c. 1869

- Location within Alameda/Oakland
- 37.775777°N 122.304766°W
- Location: Naval Air Station Alameda; Alameda, California

History
- Built: 1864 by the San Francisco and Alameda Railroad (1864-1870)

California Historical Landmark
- Designated: June 8, 1949
- Reference no.: 440

Alameda Terminal (also known as Alameda Wharf) was a railroad station and ferry wharf at the foot and west of present-day Pacific Avenue and Main Street in Alameda, California, on the eastern shore of San Francisco Bay with ferry service to San Francisco. It was built in 1864 and operated by the San Francisco and Alameda Railroad. In 1869, it served as the original west coast terminus of the U.S. First transcontinental railroad, until the opening of Oakland Pier two months later. The western terminus was inaugurated September 6, 1869, when the first Western Pacific through train from Sacramento reached the shores of San Francisco Bay at Alameda Terminal, — thus completing the first transcontinental railroad "from the Missouri river to the Pacific ocean" in accordance with the Pacific Railroad Acts.

== History ==
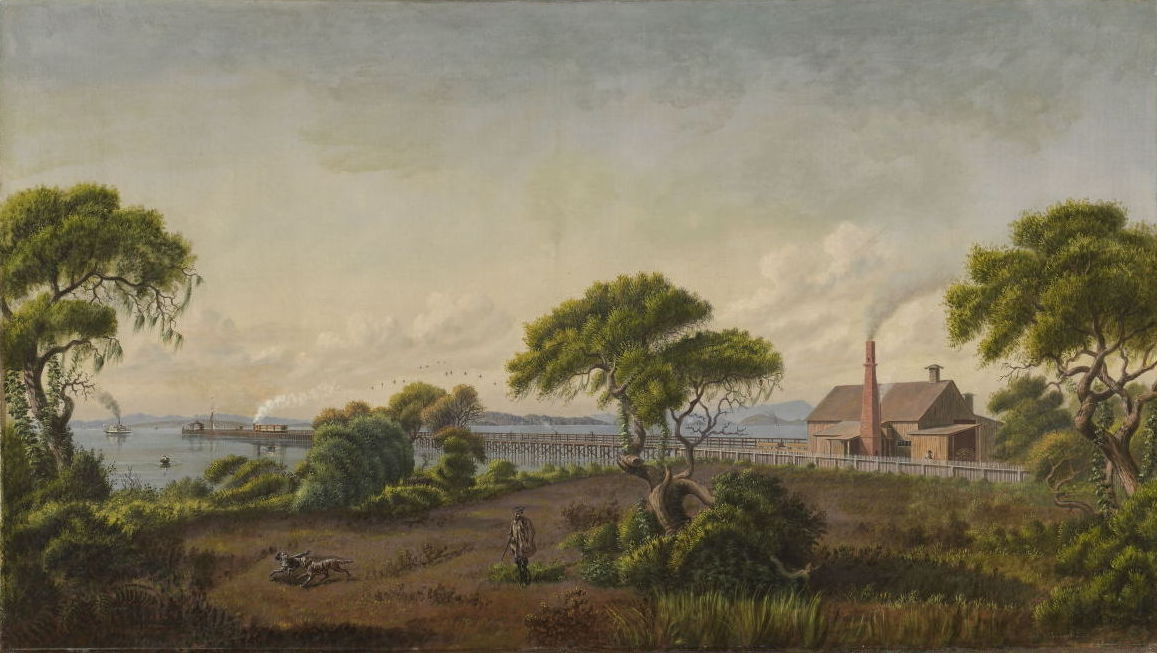
Alameda Shore (Joseph Lee, c. 1868) depicts the ferry Sophie MacLane (left) approaching Alameda Wharf on August 25, 1864.

In 1863, Alfred A. Cohen, a San Francisco lawyer, along with his associates, formulated plans to build a railroad and wharf to carry passengers not only to Alameda, but also by ferry to San Francisco. In 1864, he built a 3,750-foot-long (1.14 km) wharf, starting from a spot near today's Pacific Avenue and Main Street westward, into the Bay at that time, and ending at part of today's Alameda Point where the USS Hornet sits anchored. On August 25, 1864, Cohen inaugurated passenger service, for 25 cents, from the wharf at Vallejo and Davis Street in San Francisco, via the leased river packet Sophie MacLane, to the Alameda Wharf and then 5 miles (8.0 km) to his San Francisco and Alameda Railroad High St station. In September 1864, he leased the slightly larger Contra Costa. As business grew, he replaced the leased boat, in February 1866, with his very own ferry boat, the Alameda.

=== First transcontinental train ===
After the Pacific Railroad Act of 1862 authorized construction of the First transcontinental railroad and telegraph line, the first construction activity took place in 1863 eastward from Sacramento on the Central Pacific Railroad line. In October 1864, the Central Pacific Railroad assigned all the rights of the Pacific Railway Acts to the Western Pacific Railroad for the route between Sacramento and San Jose, including land grants. The plan was that the transcontinental railroad would follow the Western Pacific from Sacramento to San Jose and then connect with the San Francisco and San Jose Railroad (SF&SJ), completed in 1864, to San Francisco.

By 1866, Western Pacific had built 20 miles (32 km) of track north and east from San Jose, reaching halfway into Niles Canyon, to about Farwell near Milepost 33. The Western Pacific used 500 Chinese laborers to grade and construct the rail line into the rugged canyon with its tight curves and narrow banks. Construction was then halted because of disagreements between the railroad's contractors and its financiers.

In 1868, Central Pacific Railroad, a subsidiary of which had acquired the Western Pacific and Oakland Point, restarted work on the Western Pacific Railroad line starting at Sacramento working southward, as well as near Lathrop and Livermore, using upwards to 2,000 Chinese laborers. The new plan was to connect with Oakland and Oakland Point with its ferry service to San Francisco. After the golden spike ceremony at Promontory Summit, work resumed in June 1869 in Niles Canyon with track laying towards Livermore. Also in June 1869, J. H. Strobridge came to Niles (then Vallejo Mills [now part of Fremont]) to oversee the construction of the new line, with his crew of up to 600 Chinese laborers, heading towards Oakland. By midsummer, Governor Stanford made known his hopes that the line be finished in time for the opening of the State Fair on September 6. Thus in September 1869, a temporary connection was made at the bay side (west of Alvarado and Davis Sts) of San Leandro with the old tracks of the San Francisco and Alameda Railroad, which led to the SF&A Alameda Wharf with ferry service to San Francisco.

On September 6, 1869, the first Western Pacific train reached the shores of San Francisco Bay at Alameda Terminal, thus achieving the transcontinental Pacific Railroad envisioned in the 1862 Pacific Railroad Act. The Daily Evening Herald (Stockton, California) reported "The Laying of the Last Rail" at the San Joaquin river. "On Monday afternoon at three o'clock, the iron wedding of the Atlantic and Pacific Oceans took place. In May last, when Chicago and Sacramento were wedded by the laying of the last rail at Promontory Point, members of the Press were present from all parts of the country. Trains of spectators came from both ends of the road. The last tie was a highly polished California laurel one, and the last spike was of gold. But when the Atlantic and Pacific were wedded on Monday there was no excitement, no crowd, no breaking of champagne bottles, no offering of prayers - no nothing. the first was a first-class shoddy affair; the Latter, a marriage of consequence without parade."

According to the Daily Alta California, this first through train left Sacramento at 10 am, got delayed by some construction trains, exited Niles Canyon late at 9:30 pm, and an hour later arrived at Alameda Terminal to a cheering crowd. "As the train neared the Alameda Station, an immense crowd of ladies and gentlemen, and all the young ones they owned, awaited the auspicious moment of its stoppage. At the station was a quadrangular superstructure, having upon each side an arch of evergreens, beautifully adorned with a vast profusion of roses and flowers, for which Alameda County is so justly renowned; over and about these were a multitude of flags, which seemed to bear in their folds an unusual amount of pride and grace and beauty. And now the hoarse whistle is heard, and the jolly fireman wakes up the steamer's bell, in response to waves of joyous emotions which were rapidly passing westward over the iron rails. And cannons boomed, and loud huzzas, and bells, and whistles. and boys and men all tried on a conglomerate language which would set at bay the untiring genius of modern philology. And so passed the first train to its great western terminus. Every house that had a flag displayed it; every head that had a tongue joined the chorus; every heart that could scan the past and survey the future filled with emotion, as the spectre of fire and of life came and went." Continuing passengers boarded the ferry Alameda and crossed the Bay to the Davis St Wharf in San Francisco.

The steamer Oakland, strengthened and converted into a car ferry capable of carrying up to four freight cars at one time, also began service in September 1869, from Alameda wharf to the San Francisco freight slip.

Two months later, Central Pacific Railroad switched the western transcontinental terminus to its expanded Oakland Pier, which was inaugurated on November 8, 1869, in another round of celebration. Alameda then went back to local passenger train service. Freight service from Alameda continued until 1870 when the freight slip at Oakland wharf and the new line through First Street, Oakland, were completed. In 1870 the SF&A was absorbed into Central Pacific and in 1873 the SF&A pier was abandoned, at least for rail-ferry purposes. It was subsequently used by the Pacific Coast Oil Company which established its refinery adjacent to the wharf in 1880. It was listed in the local city directory as the business address of the E.M. Derby lumber yard from at least 1874 to about 1885.

== Present day ==
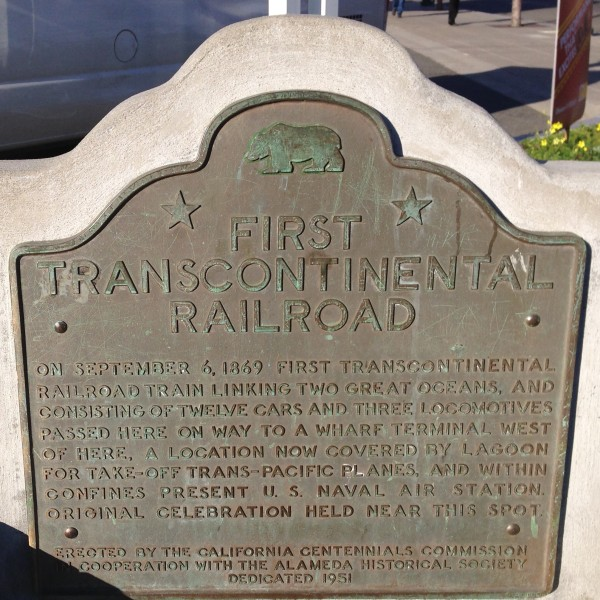
California Historical Landmark #440: NW corner of Lincoln Ave and Webster St in Alameda

The railroads and their wharfs are gone from Alameda. The last rails were removed in 1960 from Lincoln Ave (formerly Railroad Ave and along which the SF&A rails ran).

The achievement of the first transcontinental railroad reaching Alameda Terminal on September 6, 1869, is marked by a plaque in the Naval Air Station Alameda and a California Historical Landmark (CHL #440) nearby. The GPS coordinates of the two markers are given respectively by 37.786779,-122.30292 (plaque); and 37.77535,-122.276891 (CHL #440).

On 6 September 2019, a "golden spike" ceremony was held in Niles Canyon, where the Western Pacific track laid in 1866 was linked with the Central Pacific track laid in 1869, commemorating the 150th anniversary of the 6 September 1869 completion of the first transcontinental railroad to the Pacific coast terminus at Alameda Terminal. Also, the mayor of the City of Alameda issued a proclamation recognizing "the outstanding contributions of the many Chinese immigrants who helped make the Transcontinental Railroad a reality". At the terminal there is a plaque that marks terminus of the First Transcontinental Passenger train that started in New York City and terminated at Alameda Point pier on September 6, 1869.

== See also ==
- Alameda Mole
- First transcontinental railroad
- Niles Canyon Railway
- Oakland Long Wharf
- San Francisco and Oakland Railroad
- San Francisco and San Jose Railroad
