= Central Pacific Railroad Depot =

Central Pacific Railroad Depot may refer to:

- Lovelock station, Nevada
- Central Pacific Railroad Depot (Oakland)

== See also ==
- Central Pacific Railroad
