= San Francisco and Oakland Railroad =

Pioneer railroad with ferry in California (1862–1870)

Overview
- Locale: Northern California
- Dates of operation: 1862–1870
- Successor: Central Pacific Railroad

Technical
- Track gauge: 4 ft 8 1/2 in (1,435 mm) standard gauge

The San Francisco and Oakland Railroad (SF&O) was built in 1862 to provide ferry-train service from a San Francisco ferry terminal connecting with railroad service through Oakland to San Antonio. In 1868 Central Pacific Railroad decided that Oakland would be the west coast terminus of the First transcontinental railroad and bought SF&O. Beginning November 8, 1869, part of the SF&O line served as the westernmost portion of the transcontinental railroad, which was absorbed into the Southern Pacific Railroad (SP) in 1885.

The track later became part of the Key System and was electrified in 1911. The system extended across the San Francisco-Oakland Bay Bridge in 1939.

== History ==
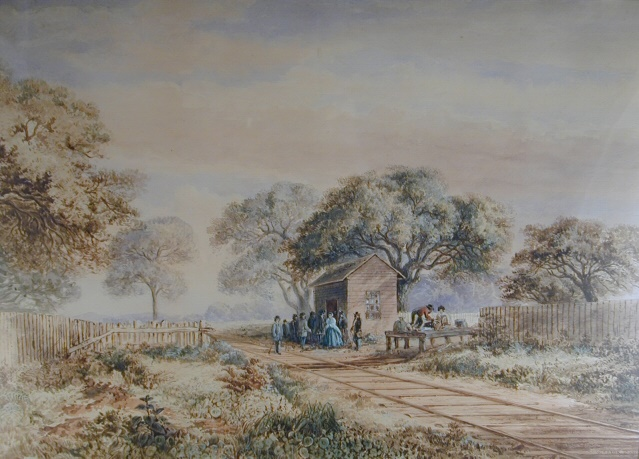
Train station at Adeline Street in 1867

The San Francisco and Oakland Railroad (and Ferry Co.) was formed in October 1861 under the leadership of Rodman Gibbons and other Oakland residents in order to provide transportation to Oakland by means of a ferry from San Francisco to a small wharf at Oakland Point where passengers could take a train into Oakland. Service began in September 1862 along 7th Street to a station in downtown Oakland at Broadway.

Traffic increased steadily so an extension of the line was planned. In 1864 the track was extended across a bridge over Indian Creek Slough, the outlet to Lake Merritt, then along private right-of-way adjacent to San Antonio Creek (Oakland Estuary) to the Commerce Street Wharf (foot of 14th Avenue) in San Antonio.

The cost of the extension and of building a new larger ferry boat caused Gibbons and his associates to lose control of the company SF&O in 1865 to A. A. Cohen, president of the San Francisco and Alameda Railroad (SF&A). After Central Pacific Railroad (CP) decided in April 1868 to make Oakland the western terminus of the transcontinental railroad, its subsidiary purchased the majority of the stock of the struggling SF&O from A. A. Cohen in August 1868 and began to expand the small wharf at Oakland Point. In August 1868 the CP subsidiary also purchased the majority of the stock of SF&A, bankrupt by the 1868 Hayward earthquake. In 1870 they merged the two local railroads together and then brought them back into the Central Pacific.

Meanwhile, the Western Pacific Railroad had surveyed a line from San Jose via Niles Canyon and Altamont Pass to Sacramento, but ran out of money in a 1866 dispute, after laying 20 miles (32 km) of track from San Jose into the middle of Niles Canyon. By 1868, a CP subsidiary had purchased the WP line and then restarted the construction of it, through a contract with Turton, Knox & Ryan, beginning February 1868 from Sacramento working south to connect with the line beginning, later in June 1869, eastward from the point Western Pacific had stopped in Niles Canyon. Also in June 1869, they added a new line, through a contract with J. H. Strobridge, from Niles northwest towards Oakland. In September 1869 this new line towards Oakland was first connected temporarily to the SF&A at San Leandro. The first through Western Pacific train from Sacramento arrived on September 6, 1869 at the SF&A Alameda Terminal, and then by SF&A ferry to San Francisco, just in time for the opening of the 1869 State Fair in Sacramento, completing the first transcontinental railroad to the Pacific.

Two months later, the connection to the SF&O was made and the small Oakland Point wharf was expanded. On the morning of November 8, 1869, the first transcontinental train to use the expanded ferry terminal at Oakland Point traversed the SF&O line and the Western Pacific Railroad to get to Sacramento and continue east on the Central Pacific Railroad. The city of Oakland held a large celebration later in the day to greet the first westbound transcontinental train.

Having large amounts of long-distance passenger and freight railroad traffic traverse Oakland on 7th Street, one of its main streets, was not a good idea for either the city or the railroad. During 1869 and 1870, a bypass track was constructed starting in San Antonio and using a new bridge across Indian Creek Slough that led to 1st Street and along this street to Oakland Point. Initially the bypass was used for freight trains only, but in later years, long-distance passenger trains used it also and a new station for them was built at 1st Street and Broadway (Jack London Square).

After 1879, the transcontinental trains no longer used the Altamont Pass Niles Canyon route, taking a shorter route from Sacramento via Benicia to reach Oakland Pier instead, but trains to Los Angeles continued to use the former SF&O and Western Pacific routes to reach San Jose.

On 7th Street there was still a large amount of traffic of local steam passenger trains as the service was extended farther into East Oakland. The Central Pacific Railroad was leased to the Southern Pacific Railroad in 1885. In 1911 the SP started electrifying its local train service in the East Bay. The Oakland 7th Street line was extended to Dutton Avenue in San Leandro and carried the most passengers of any line in the system. In 1939, under the subsidiary company, Interurban Electric Railway (IER) the line was rerouted over the San Francisco-Oakland Bay Bridge into the San Francisco Transbay Terminal. IER service on the 7th Street line was abandoned in March, 1941, but the track on 7th Street from Broadway to Pine Street was put back in service (1943–1946) during World War II to enable streetcars of the Key System to reach several military installations; these tracks were abandoned shortly after the end of the war.

== Ferryboats ==
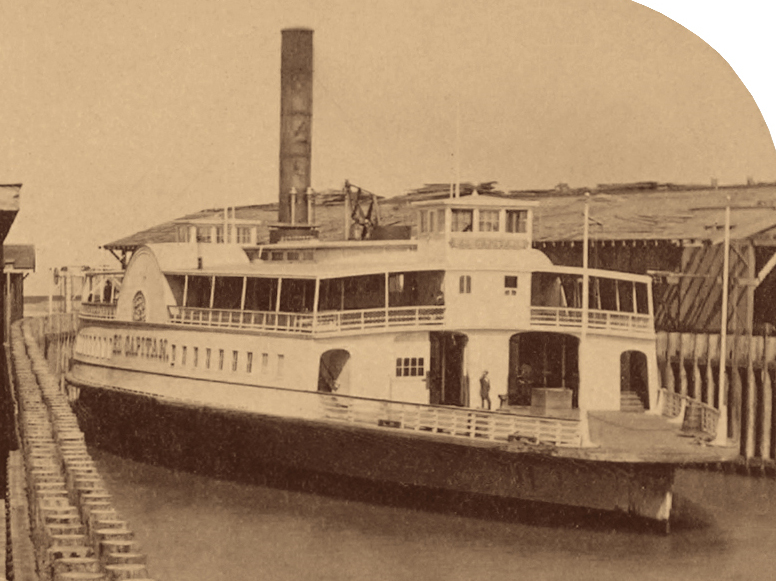
Ferry El Capitan was built by Central Pacific in 1868.

The first ferryboat used by the SF&O, the leased Contra Costa, had previously been in service from San Francisco to the foot of Broadway. The lease ended in 1864 and the SF&O purchased the ferryboat Louise to replace it. With the extended railroad line, traffic increased considerably and the Louise was soon inadequate for regular service. The larger river packet Washoe, having been damaged in an explosion, was purchased, extensively rebuilt as a ferryboat, and placed in service. In 1868, the Central Pacific Railroad controlled the SF&O and anticipated much increased traffic when the transcontinental railroad was completed to Oakland. They ordered a new even larger ferryboat, the El Capitan, from a new shipyard at Oakland Point, and placed it in service.

== Locomotives ==
The SF&O originally purchased a small, unnamed, 2-2-0 type locomotive and a larger 4-4-4 type tank locomotive named the Liberty. In 1863, needing another locomotive, the SF&O purchased a 2-2-4 type combination locomotive and express car from a line in San Francisco. It was unnamed, but was unofficially called Old Betsy. By 1869, a more powerful locomotive was needed to pull longer trains, so a new 4-4-0 type locomotive was ordered and named the Oakland. With the SF&O merged into the Central Pacific Railroad in 1870, the former SF&O locomotives were sent to various other locations on the CP system and CP locomotives were brought in to pull the local trains on 7th Street.

Name	Builder	Type	Date	Notes
	Vulcan Iron Works, San Francisco	2-2-0	1862	
Liberty	Vulcan Iron Works, San Francisco	4-4-4 Tank locomotive	1862	became California Pacific RR # 178; rebuilt as 4-4-0 in 1872; became Stockton & Copperopolis # 3; then Southern Pacific # 1101; retired 1892
Old Betsy		2-2-4		purchased 1863 from Market Street Railroad of San Francisco
Oakland	Cooke Locomotive and Machine Works	4-4-0	1869	became California Pacific RR shop switcher in Sacramento; retired 1877

== See also ==
- Oakland Long Wharf
- Oakland Point
- San Francisco and Alameda Railroad
- San Francisco and San Jose Railroad

== Bibliography ==
- "IER, The Big Red Cars". The Western Railroader. 19 (7). San Mateo, California: Francis A. Guido. May 1956.
- Due, John F. (December 1956). "The San Francisco and Alameda Railroad". Pacific Railway Journal. 1 (11). San Marino, California: Southern California Chapter, Railway & Locomotive Historical Society and the Pacific Railroad Society: 2–8.
- Ford, Robert S. (1977). Red Trains in the East Bay: The History of the Southern Pacific Transbay and Ferry System. Interurbans Specials. Vol. 65. Glendale, California: Interurbans Publications. ISBN 0-916374-27-0.
- Harlan, George H. (1967). San Francisco Bay Ferryboats. Berkeley, California: Howell-North Books.
- Sappers, Vernon J. (2007). Key System Streetcars: Transit, Real Estate and the Growth of the East Bay. Wilton, California: Signature Press. ISBN 978-1-930013-07-0.
- Trimble, Paul C.; Knorp, William (2007). Ferries of San Francisco Bay. Images of America. Charleston, South Carolina: Arcadia Publishing. ISBN 978-0-7385-4731-2.
