= San Francisco and Alameda Railroad =

American pioneer railroad (1864–1870)

Overview
- Locale: Northern California
- Dates of operation: 1864–1870
- Successor: Central Pacific Railroad

Technical
- Track gauge: 4 ft 8 1/2 in (1,435 mm) standard gauge

The San Francisco and Alameda Railroad (SF&A) was a short-lived railroad company in the East Bay area of the San Francisco Bay Area. The railroad line opened 1864–1865 from Alameda Terminal on Alameda Island to Hayward, California, with ferry service between Alameda Terminal and San Francisco started in 1864. After being bankrupted by the 1868 Hayward earthquake, it was acquired by a subsidiary of the Central Pacific Railroad in August 1869. Part of the SF&A line between Alameda Terminal and San Leandro served as a portion of the First transcontinental railroad starting in September 1869 (though most was replaced by the San Francisco and Oakland Railroad by November 1869), while the southern section was abandoned in 1873.

The remaining part of the line became part of the Southern Pacific Railroad. From 1911 to 1941, the section on Alameda was used for electrified commuter service. Freight service on Alameda lasted until 1960. The middle section of the SF&A line between Fruitvale and San Leandro is still in service as part of the Union Pacific Railroad Niles Subdivision. It is used by Amtrak Capitol Corridor and Coast Starlight passenger trains and Union Pacific freight trains.

== History ==
In 1863 A. A. Cohen, a prominent San Francisco attorney, together with Charles Minturn, an operator of river steamboats and bay ferries, E. B. Mastick, a prominent Alameda landowner, and others incorporated the San Francisco and Alameda Railroad to provide passenger and freight ferry-train service to Alameda, San Leandro, Hayward (then called Haywards) and perhaps farther.

=== Construction ===
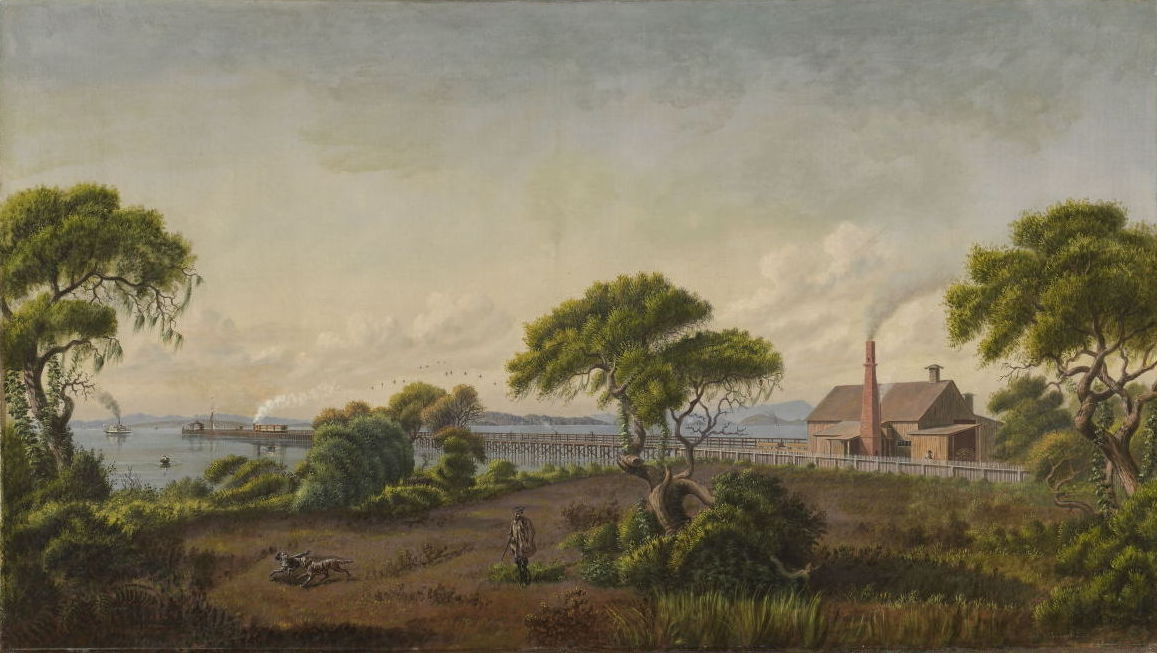
Alameda Shore (Joseph Lee, c. 1868) depicts a ferry meeting the first run of the railroad on August 25, 1864.

System construction began in 1864 on a wharf and railroad station (Alameda Terminal) at the foot of Pacific Avenue in Alameda and a railroad from there along Pacific Avenue to 4th Street, private right-of-way to 5th Street, Linnet Street (later Railroad Avenue, then Lincoln Avenue) to Alameda station at Park Street with a few intermediate stations including Mastick, east of 8th Street, and Encinal, east of Grand Street, named after the neighborhood, but also known as Fasskings after the nearby entertainment pavilion. Service began later that year.

Construction continued via private right-of-way between the Oakland Estuary and San Leandro Bay, (Alameda was then a peninsula rather than an island) to stations named Fruit Vale (later renamed Fernside) at Fernside Boulevard and Pearl Street near the present Fruitvale Bridge, to Simpson's (later renamed Melrose) near the present 48th Avenue and then, turning southeastward, to Fitch's (later named Fitchburg) near the present 77th Avenue, to Jones (later Elmhurst) near the present 98th Avenue to the Bay side of San Leandro near Davis Street.

At San Leandro, the track turned sharply left (heading east) there onto Ward (now West Estudillo) Street to the SF&A San Leandro station at the intersection with the county road (now East 14th Street). The track then turned sharply to the right to follow the county road southward (now East 14th Street in San Leandro, and Mission Boulevard in Hayward). Near Hayward, the track angled to the right on private right-of-way to A Street and Watkins Street, following Watkins Street to D Street where a station was built. Service to Hayward started in 1865. There were five trips daily, linking Hayward to San Francisco, and made commuting for Hayward area residents a viable option for the first time. But with only 30 homes in Hayward at that time, it was not profitable.

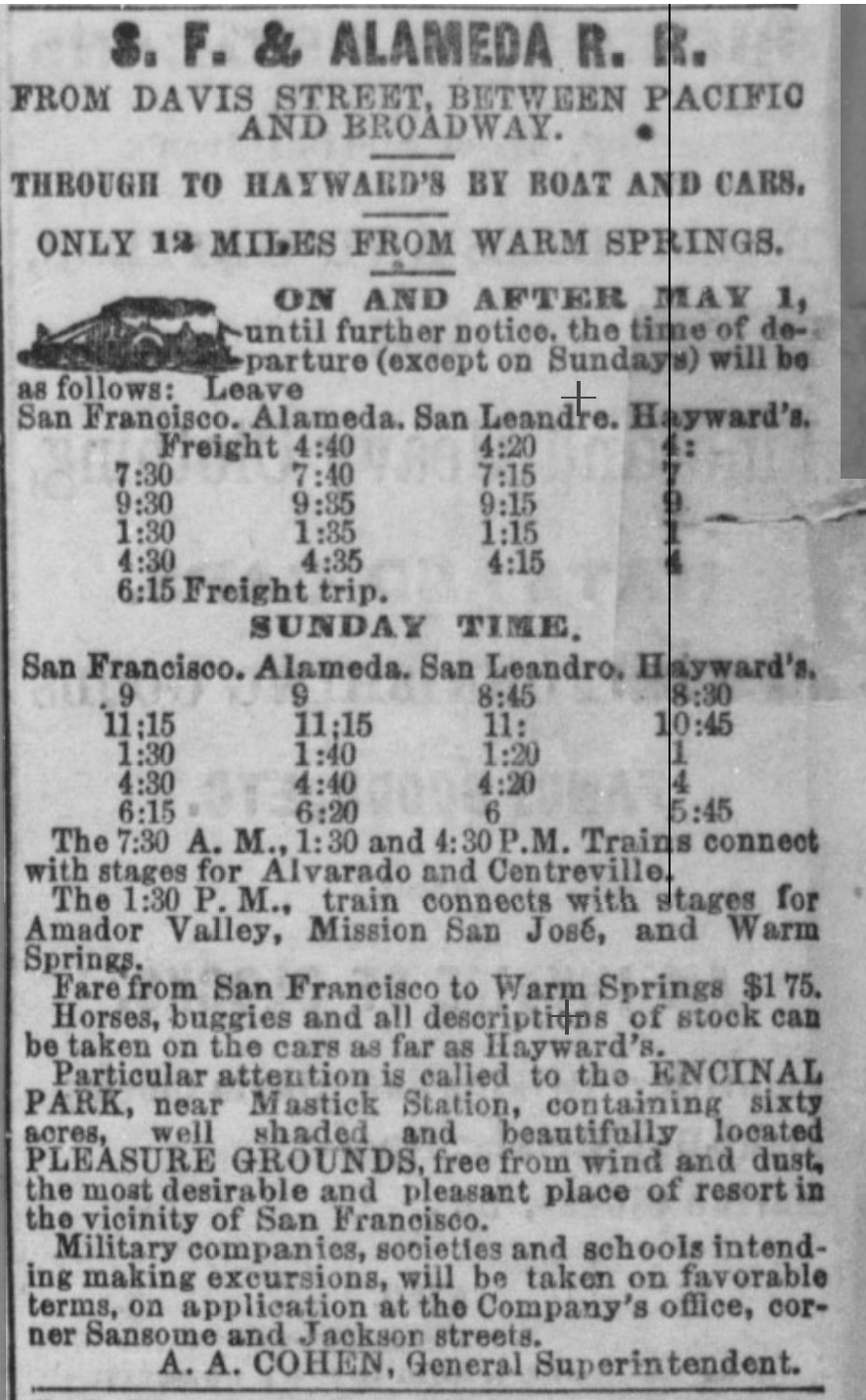
San Francisco and Alameda Railroad Advertisement describes the route on 20 August 1867, Daily Alta California

=== Mergers and acquisitions ===
In 1865, Cohen gained control of the overextended San Francisco and Oakland Railroad. After Central Pacific Railroad decided to make Oakland the western terminus of the First transcontinental railroad in April 1868, its subsidiary purchased the majority of stock in SF&O from Cohen in August 1868. After the October 1868 Hayward earthquake bankrupted SF&A, the CP subsidiary purchased also the majority of stock in SF&A while retaining Cohen on the CP payroll as a lawyer.

By 1866 the Western Pacific Railroad had built a line from San Jose northwest to Vallejo Mills (mouth of Niles Canyon, later Niles and now part of Fremont) and had laid out the rest of the line through the canyon, through Livermore Valley, over Altamont Pass, and on to Stockton and Sacramento, before running out of money. A Central Pacific subsidiary then took control of the Western Pacific, finished building the line, and added a line northwest from Niles toward Oakland. It was determined that the SF&A track north of Hayward with its sharp turns on Ward Street in San Leandro was unsuitable for main-line trains. Thus the Western Pacific connection was made on the Bay side (west of Alvarado and Davis Streets) of San Leandro, establishing a new San Leandro station there and providing a through route to Alameda Pier. On September 6, 1869, the first transcontinental train to the Bay Area ran through Alameda to Alameda Terminal, where the passengers boarded the ferryboat Alameda to San Francisco. A California Historical Landmark plaque (no. 440) commemorates this event. Construction was then started on the connection from Simpson's to the SF&O in San Antonio. When the connection to the SF&O was completed in November, the transcontinental trains operated to Oakland Pier instead. Alameda then went back to local train service only.

In June 1870 the SF&O and SF&A were merged to form the San Francisco, Oakland and Alameda Railroad, which existed for two months before it was brought back into the Central Pacific Railroad.

In 1873 the Central Pacific Railroad made some economy cutbacks. The Alameda train service now used new track north from Fernside station alongside Fruitvale Avenue to a new Fruitvale station at the junction with the CPRR main line from Oakland south and terminated there. The former SF&A line from San Leandro to Hayward was abandoned, despite the protests from these towns. Track was laid north from Mastick station to a bridge being built across the Oakland Estuary to connect with Alice Street with the tracks continuing along this street to 7th Street so that Alameda trains could continue to Oakland Pier. Alameda Pier (at Pacific Avenue) was no longer used.

In 1887, the Central Pacific Railroad was leased to the Southern Pacific Railroad. In 1898 the Alice Street bridge and tracks to 7th Street in Oakland were replaced by a bridge to Harrison Street with a track connection to the 1st Street line to Oakland Pier. In 1903 the Oakland Tidal Canal was finished, linking the Oakland Estuary with San Leandro Bay, making Alameda into an island, and requiring the construction of the Fruitvale Bridge. In 1906, some Alameda trains started using the newer Alameda Pier, originally built by the South Pacific Coast Railroad, located on the south shore of the Oakland Estuary at the far western end of Alameda.

=== Later years ===
In 1911 the Southern Pacific Railroad electrified most of its local lines in the East Bay. The electrified Alameda line, now called the Lincoln Avenue line, went from Alameda Pier via private right of way to Main Street, to the original Pacific Avenue tracks, then to Alameda and Fernside stations, and then to a new loop around the eastern end of Alameda to connect with the Encinal Avenue line, originally built by the South Pacific Coast Railroad.

In 1939, Alameda Pier was abandoned and the Lincoln Avenue line continued beyond Alameda station across the Fruitvale Bridge to a connection with the 7th Street line at the later Fruitvale station. The trains then followed the 7th Street line through Oakland and across the San Francisco-Oakland Bay Bridge to the San Francisco Transbay Terminal. This was an indirect route for passengers from western Alameda. Passenger service was abandoned in January, 1941, and replaced by Key System buses using a shorter route via a tunnel (Posey Tube), aligned with Harrison Street in Oakland, but freight service continued over most of the route. The last passenger train on this line was an excursion train, pulled by a steam engine, for the Bay Area Electric Railroad Association in April, 1954. Freight service ended in 1960 and the tracks were removed.

== Ferryboats ==
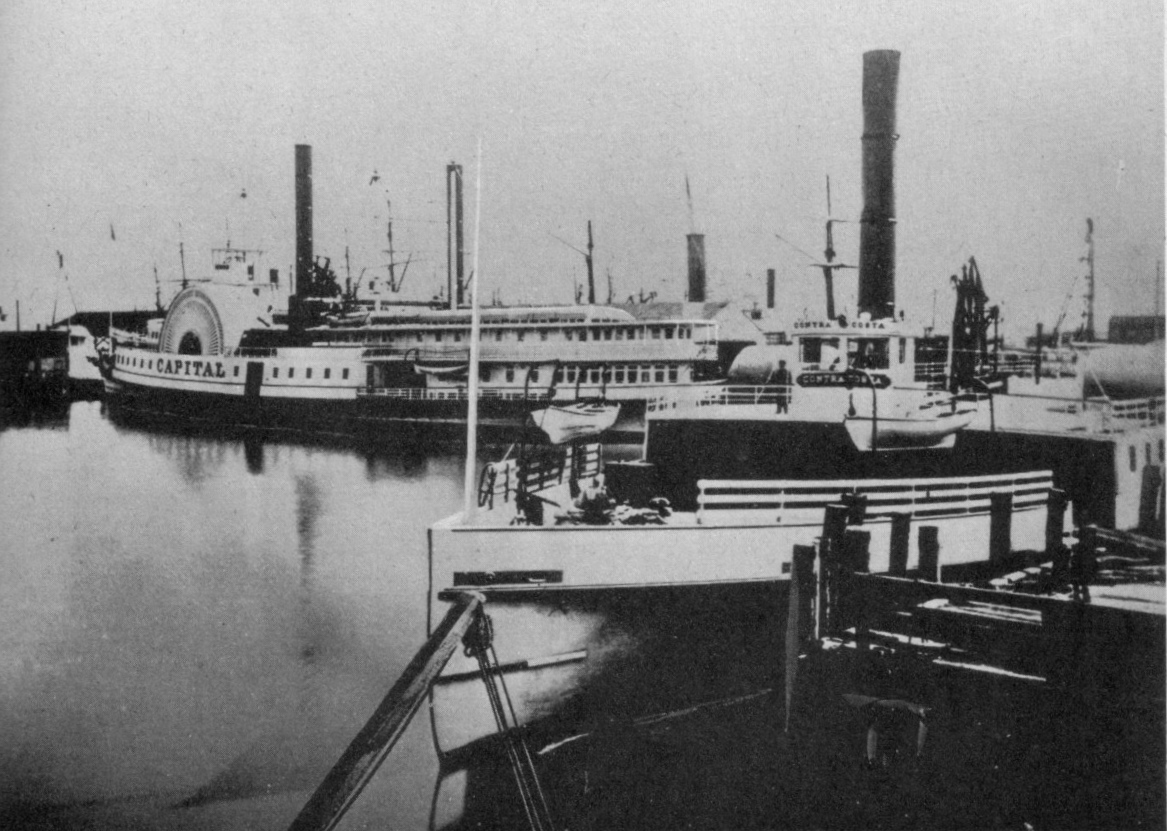
Early ferry Contra Costa is in the foreground.

The first ferryboat used by the SF&A was a river packet named Sophie MacLane, leased from Charles Minturn's company. It soon proved to be too small, so it was returned to Sacramento River service and Minturn moved the Contra Costa, a ferryboat built for service from San Francisco to the foot of Broadway in Oakland, over to the SF&A route. As business built up, even the Contra Costa became inadequate, so the SF&A had a new ferryboat built. It was completed in January 1866, was named Alameda, and was the first double-ended ferryboat on the Bay. After the SF&A was taken over by the Central Pacific Railroad, the Alameda was placed in the pool of CP ferryboats and served in various locations.

== Locomotives ==
The initial order for locomotives was for two of the 2-2-0 type. They arrived in 1864 and one was named E. B. Mastick and the other was sold to a Southern California railroad. Soon after service was started, it was realized that a more powerful locomotive was needed, so the J. C. Kellogg, a 4-4-0 type, was built by the SF&A. In 1868 another 4-4-0 locomotive was ordered and delivered. It was named the F. D. Atherton and was heavily damaged in the wreck at Simpson's the following year, but was rebuilt. When the Central Pacific Railroad took over the SF&A, other locomotives were brought in and the three SF&A locomotives were sent elsewhere on the CP system.

Name	Builder	Type	Date	Notes
	Vulcan Iron Works, San Francisco	2-2-0	1864	sold to Los Angeles & San Pedro RR as San Gabriel; destroyed by boiler explosion in 1869. I have read that it was destroyed in an accident in 1875 (http://discussion.cprr.net/2013/09/pet-locomotive-2-2-0-san-gabriel.html)
E.B.Mastick	Vulcan Iron Works, San Francisco	2-2-0	1864	became Central Pacific RR Oakland shop switcher in 1870; scrapped in 1874
J.G.Kellogg	SF&A shops	4-4-0		became California Pacific RR # 176; then Stockton & Copperopolis # 2; then Southern Pacific # 1100; retired 1891
F.D.Atherton	Grant Locomotive Works	4-4-0	1868	wrecked in 1869; rebuilt as Central Pacific RR #177 in 1873

== Wreck ==
On November 14, 1869, the first major railroad accident in California occurred east of Simpson's. The morning eastbound transcontinental train left Oakland Pier, but was delayed. The morning inbound SF&A local left Hayward, but was delayed also. They were scheduled to pass at Simpson's, which was in a heavy fog area that morning. The transcontinental train arrived at Simpson's first and had a confused exchange with the switchman. Assuming that the local had already passed, the transcontinental train proceeded east in the fog at speed and collided with the local train. Among the 15 killed were 4 from the engine crews, and 21 passengers were injured, some seriously. Both locomotives were heavily damaged, but were rebuilt. Several passenger cars were destroyed. An inquest was held which found the switchman to be negligent. He was tried for manslaughter, but found not guilty. A second track was soon built between Simpson's and San Leandro.

== See also ==
- San Francisco and Oakland Railroad
- San Francisco and San Jose Railroad
