= Oakland Long Wharf =

Former rail-ferry pier in California

Oakland Pier
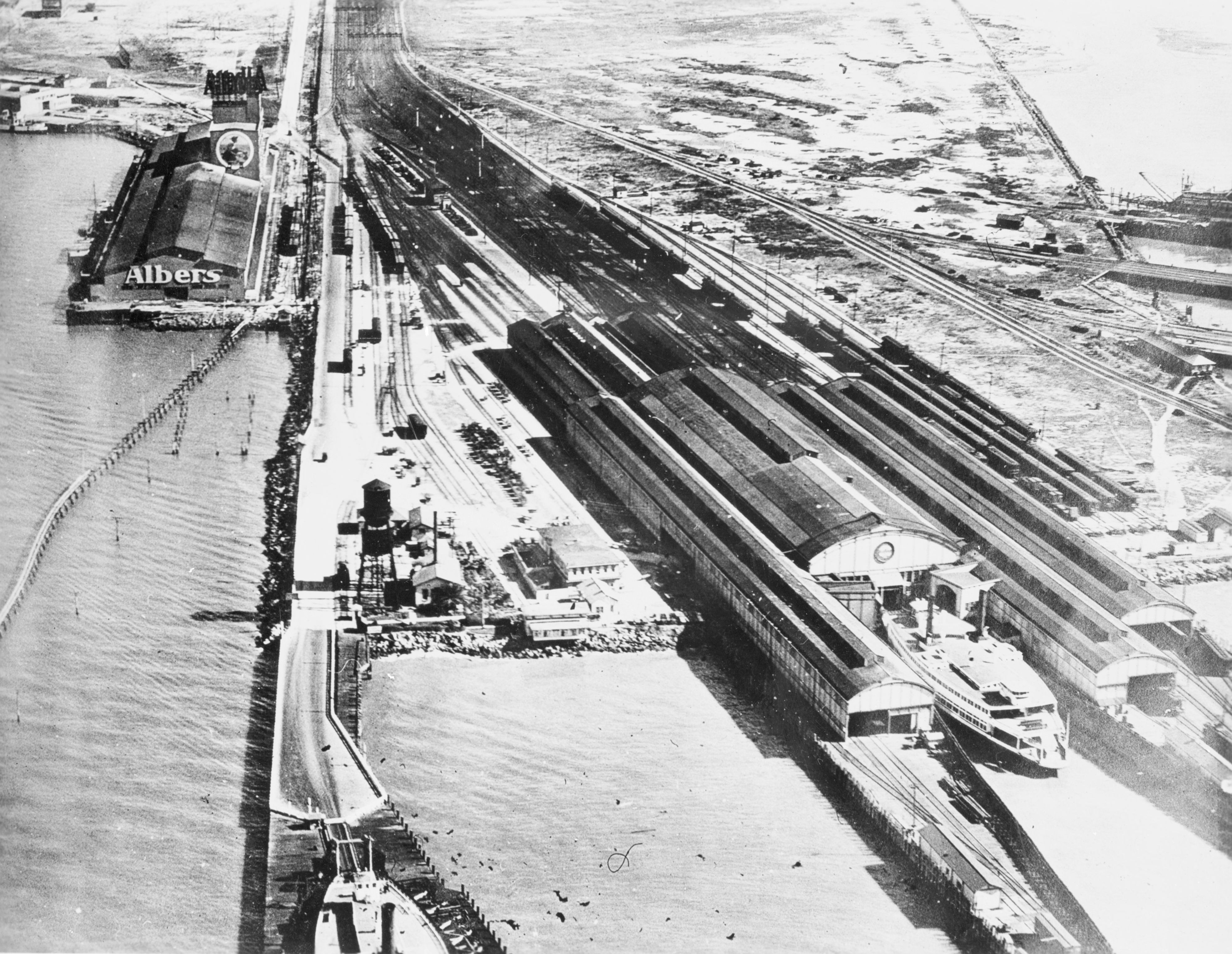
- Oakland Pier sometime after 1919

General information
- Location: Oakland, California
- Coordinates: 37.810°N 122.326°W

History
- Opened: 1852
- Closed: April 1958
- Rebuilt: 1861, 1879–1882

Former services
Preceding station	Southern Pacific Railroad	Following station
San Francisco Ferry Building Terminus	Connection to San Francisco via Ferry	Terminus
Terminus	Shasta Route	Oakland toward Portland
Terminus	Overland Route	Oakland toward Ogden
Terminus	San Joaquin Valley Line	Oakland toward Los Angeles
Terminus	Oakland – San Jose	Oakland First Street toward San Jose
Terminus	Berkeley Branch Until 1939	Oakland toward Thousand Oaks
Terminus	7th Street Line Until 1939	Pine Street toward San Leandro–Dutton Avenue
Terminus	California Street Line Until 1933	Oakland toward Thousand Oaks
Terminus	Ninth Street Line Until 1939	Oakland toward Thousand Oaks
Terminus	18th Street Line Until 1933	Oakland toward 2nd & Webster
Preceding station	Western Pacific Railroad	Following station
Terminus	California Zephyr (1949–1958)	Oakland toward Chicago
Preceding station	Atchison, Topeka and Santa Fe Railway	Following station
Terminus	Valley Division (1933–1937)	Oakland toward Barstow

Oakland Designated Landmark
- Designated: 1981
- Reference no.: 49
Location

The Oakland Long Wharf was an 11,000-foot (3,400 m) railroad wharf and ferry pier along the east shore of San Francisco Bay located at the foot of Seventh Street in West Oakland. The Oakland Long Wharf was built, beginning 1868, by the Central Pacific Railroad on what was previously Oakland Point. Beginning November 8, 1869, it served as the west coast terminus of the first transcontinental railroad. In the 1880s, Southern Pacific Railroad took over the CPRR, extending it and creating a new ferry terminal building with the official station name Oakland Pier. The entire structure became commonly and popularly called the Oakland Mole. Portions of the Wharf lasted until the 1960s. The site is now part of the facilities of the Port of Oakland, while passenger train service operates at the nearby Jack London Square/Dellums Station and another nearby station in Emeryville.

== History ==
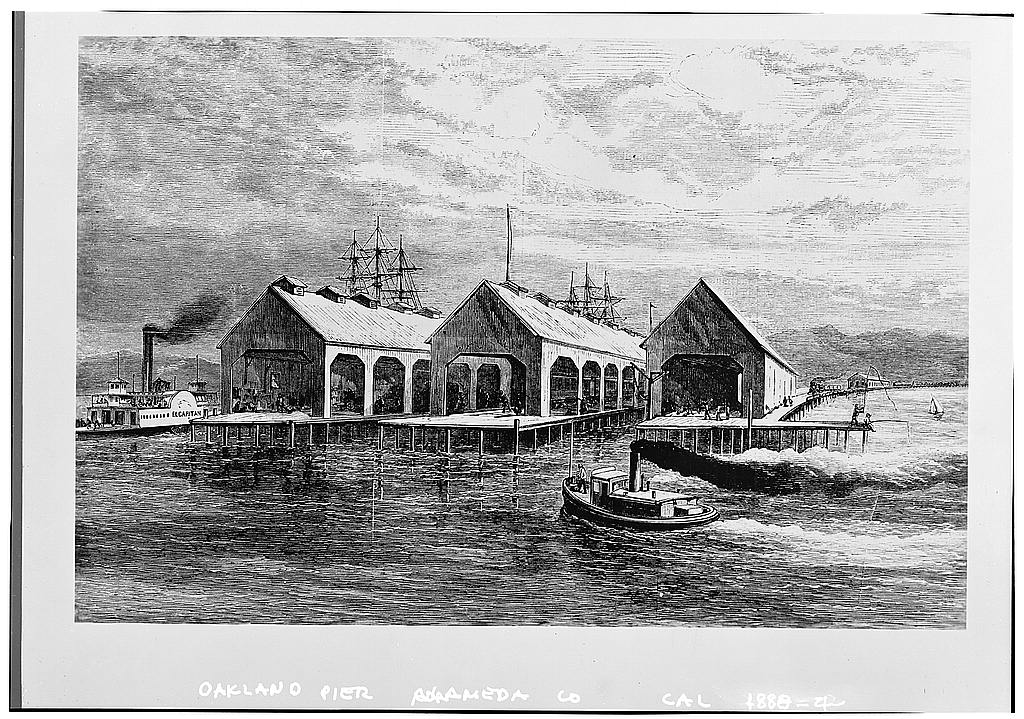
The Oakland Long Wharf, in 1878

The first use of the site for boats was in 1852, when Gibbons' Wharf was constructed at Gibbons' Point, westward into San Francisco Bay. In 1862, Gibbons' Point was renamed Oakland Point, and the wharf was first used as a ferry landing as part of the San Francisco and Oakland Railroad service. On November 8, 1869, it succeeded Alameda Terminal and became the western terminus of the First transcontinental railroad trains.

=== Central Pacific ===
In 1868, the Central Pacific Railroad acquired this pier and immediately began extending and improving it, renaming it the Oakland Long Wharf. The first through train on the transcontinental route left Oakland on the morning of November 8, 1869, with the inaugural west bound arrival at the Oakland wharf that evening. Local commuter trains also used the pier, while trains of the Pacific Railroad (aka: "First transcontinental railroad") used another wharf in nearby Alameda for about two months in 1869 (September 6 to November 7), after which the Oakland Long Wharf became the western terminus of the Pacific Railroad as well. From there San Francisco Bay ferries carried both commuters and long distance passengers between the Long Wharf and San Francisco. The CPRR floated freight to San Francisco starting in 1871; by then the Long Wharf reached out into the Bay 11,000 feet (3,400 m) from Oakland Point to deep water. It was fully opened for business on January 16, 1871.

In 1879–1880, the Long Wharf was reconstructed by filling part of it with rocks and earth brought in from Fruitvale and from Niles Canyon, where hundreds of Chinese workers were blasting rocks. About one million cubic yards (760,000 m^{3}) of rocks and fill was estimated for this first landfill project. On this solid fill, a large depot covered in corrugated iron and glass and lit by electric lighting was constructed in 1881, creating the Oakland Pier or Mole, which opened for traffic on January 22, 1882.

=== Southern Pacific ===
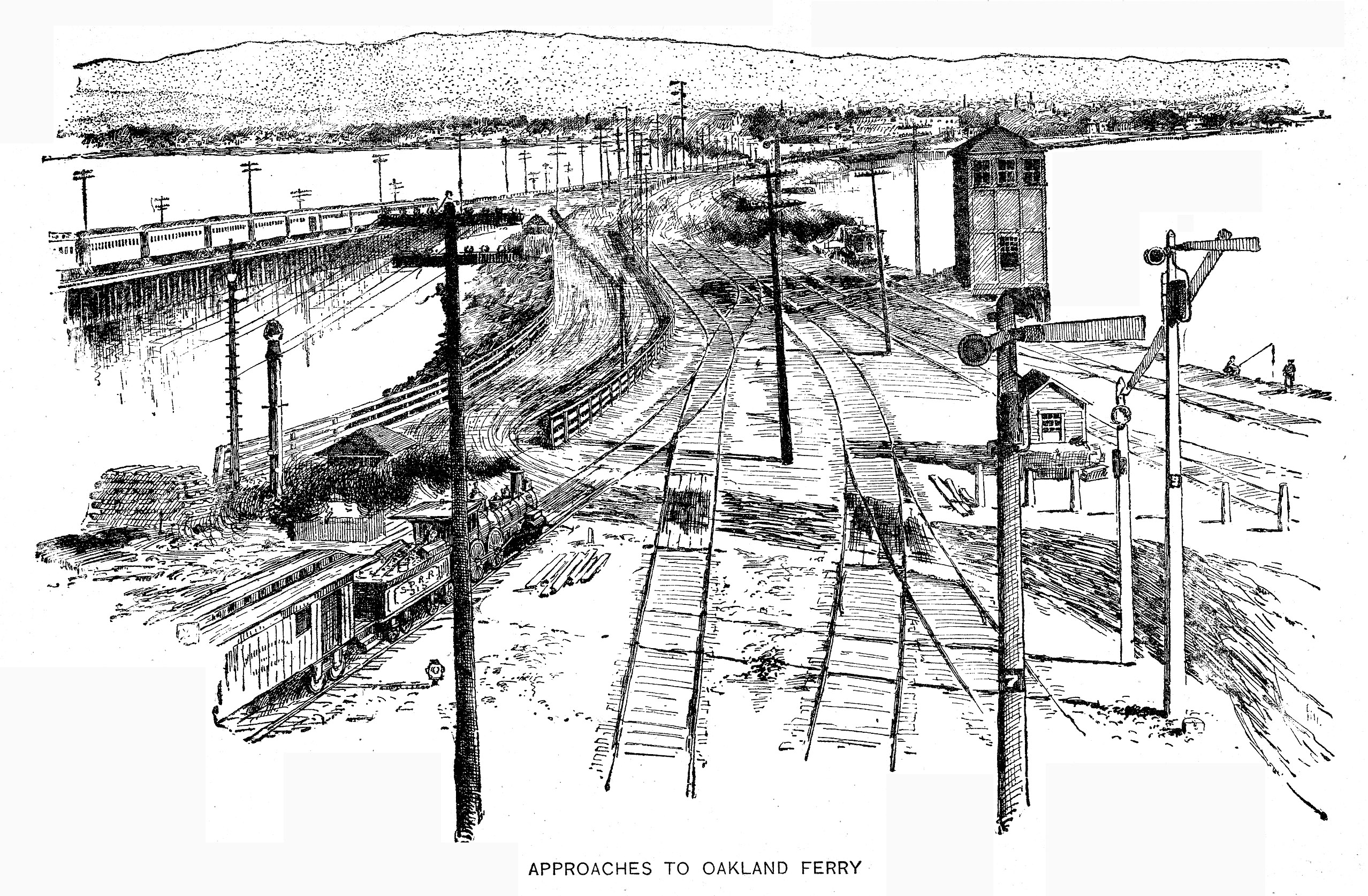
Approach to the Oakland Ferry Mole (1889)

The Central Pacific's operations were consolidated under the Southern Pacific in the 1880s, and in 1882 the Oakland Pier was opened about 1/2 mile (0.80 km) east of the west end of the Long Wharf, which was then used only for freight until being abandoned in 1919. Freight trains served docks just south of the train shed after the original was abandoned. The mole became one of the busiest piers in the United States. A huge stained-glass window of the SP logo was placed on the western end of the train shed in 1929; it is now at the California State Railroad Museum in Sacramento, California.

For decades, Oakland Pier was the main intercity connection to San Francisco. SP operated ferries between the San Francisco Ferry Building and Oakland Pier for passengers traveling between San Francisco and intercity destinations to the east (Chicago) and north (Seattle). Some San Francisco-Los Angeles Coast Route trains had Oakland sections (that combined with the San Francisco sections at San Jose) and these also departed from Oakland Pier.

SP also contracted with other railroads, allowing them to utilize Oakland Pier as a passenger terminal and ferry transfer. The Atchison, Topeka, and Santa Fe Railway ran trains here between 1933 and 1937. Later, between 1949 and 1958, it served as the terminal of Western Pacific Railroad's California Zephyr.

=== Commuter trains ===
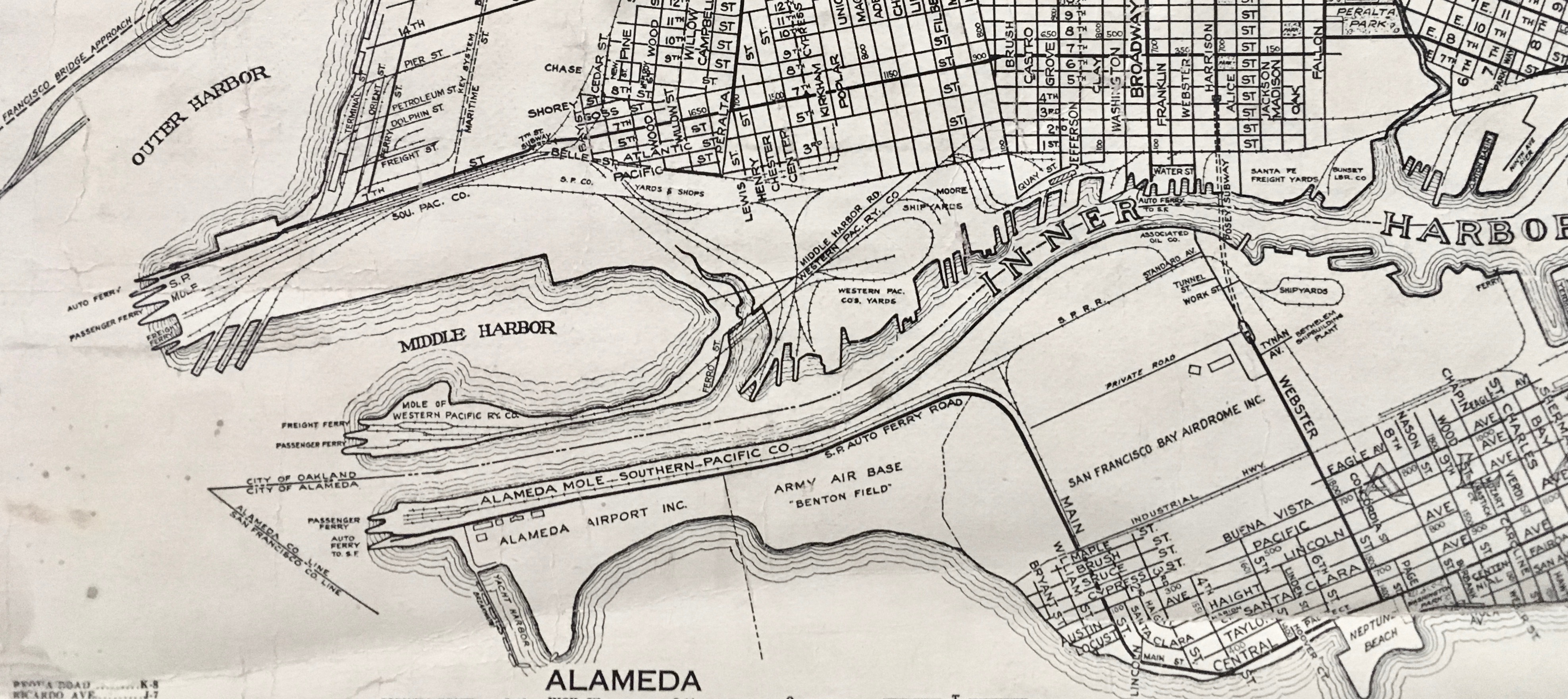
East Bay Moles in 1937

After January 15, 1939, the electric commuter trains of the East Bay Electric Lines, by then called the Interurban Electric Railway, no longer ran to Oakland Pier but instead used tracks on the lower deck of the new San Francisco-Oakland Bay Bridge, running to the Transbay Terminal in San Francisco. The IER trains were discontinued by Southern Pacific in July 1941. The last Southern Pacific ferry ran to San Francisco on July 29, 1958. The San Francisco–Oakland ferry service was replaced with buses over the Bay Bridge between San Francisco's Third and Townsend Depot and 16th Street Station, two miles (3.2 km) from Oakland Pier.

=== Demolition ===
Throughout the pier's existence, progressively greater portions of the bayshore tidelands were filled in. It was demolished in the 1960s to make way for an expansion of the growing container ship facilities of the Port of Oakland. The only structure that remains of the Oakland Long Wharf is the SP Mole's switchman's tower, which was restored and moved to Middle Harbor Shoreline Park. In the early 1970s, the Bay Area Rapid Transit (BART) trunk line and the east portal of the BART Transbay Tube connecting Oakland with San Francisco were added near the alignment of the Long Wharf in the Port.

=== Nearby railroad wharves ===
In order from north to south, the other moles and wharves along the Oakland shore have included:

- The Key System Pier and Mole, which extended from Yerba Buena Avenue nearly to Yerba Buena Island (built on the site of the 1902 foreclosed California and Nevada Railroad wharf). The area is now Judge John Sutter Regional Shoreline, at the foot of the San Francisco-Oakland Bay Bridge.
- Oakland Long Wharf/The Oakland Mole and Pier (built on the site of the 1862 Oakland Point). The area now has the east portal of the BART Transbay tube and is part of the Port of Oakland.
- The Western Pacific Mole began construction in 1906 and opened for business in 1910. It operated until 1933, and the passenger terminal was demolished in 1940. The area is now the Middle Harbor Shoreline Park.
- The Alameda Mole existed from 1876 to the 1930s and was used to connect San Francisco to Santa Cruz via a narrow-gauge railroad, initially owned by the South Pacific Coast Railroad, which was purchased by Southern Pacific in 1878. It was also used by Red Line trolley cars, and in the 1930s Pan American built a seaplane port at the base of the mole.
- The Alameda Terminal and wharf, at the foot of Pacific Avenue in Alameda, was part of the San Francisco and Alameda Railroad (1863–1870) and became the original western terminus of the First transcontinental railroad on September 6, 1869, when the first Western Pacific through train from Sacramento arrived at Alameda Terminal.

== In popular culture ==
The mole in its latter years can be seen at the beginning of the 1957 movie Pal Joey as Frank Sinatra's character arrives by train and makes his way to the ferry. It also appears in the 1952 noir film Sudden Fear starring Joan Crawford.

== See also ==
- Alameda Terminal
- Ferries of San Francisco Bay
- Oakland Point

== Bibliography ==
- Douglass, Robert (1994). "A Long Wharf with a Massive Mole". A Brief History of Oakland.
- Ford, Robert S. (1977). Red Trains in the East Bay. Interurban Press.
- Holland, Kevin J. (2001). Classic American Railroad Terminals. Osceola, WI: MBI. ISBN 9780760308325. OCLC 45908903.
- Schwarzer, Mitchell (2021). Hella Town: Oakland's History of Development and Disruption. Oakland, California: University of California Press. ISBN 9780520381124.
- Signor, John R. (2007). Southern Pacific's Western Division. Signature Press.
- Wood, M.W. (1883). History of Alameda County. Vol. 2. Oakland, California. p. 670.
