= Oakland Point, Oakland, California =

Coordinates: 37°48′27.9″N 122°18′15.98″W

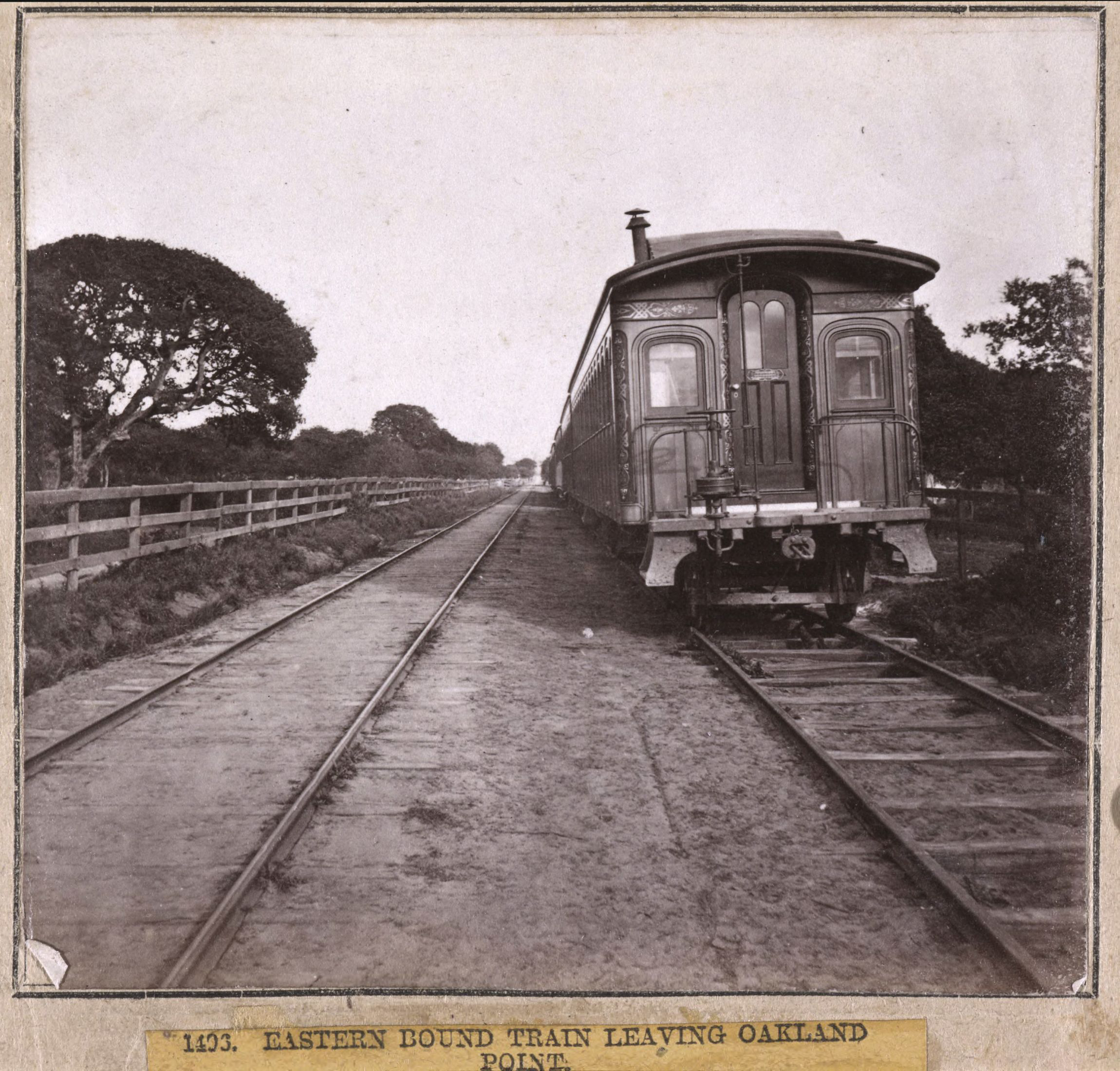
Historic photograph of a train at Oakland Point from 1860/1870 era

Oakland Point, or Gibbons' Point, was a small promontory formerly on the eastern shore of San Francisco Bay in West Oakland, California. It was located in the vicinity of what is now the Port of Oakland shipping terminal.

== History ==
Oakland Point was originally named Gibbons' Point, for an early American settler, Rodman Gibbons, who constructed a small wharf there.

The Central Pacific Railroad bought the wharf and adjacent properties in 1868, and subsequently constructed the Oakland Long Wharf, a massive terminus for the Transcontinental Railroad. In the 1880s, the Long Wharf was purchased and re-engineered by the Southern Pacific Railroad as the Oakland Mole, obliterating Oakland Point.

In addition to the wharf, the Central Pacific built a huge rail yard in the area, which later became one of the main rail yards of the Southern Pacific. Today, the same rail yard is operated by the Union Pacific Railroad.

== Neighborhood ==
The neighborhood near Oakland Point was initially known by the same name, though its identity soon merged with the rest of West Oakland, the name it was known by from the early 20th century onward. It was a thriving socially and ethnically mixed neighborhood from the late 19th century through the 1930s.

Starting about the time of World War II and up to the present, the area became predominantly African American. African American men who worked as porters on the railroad had long lived in the area together with other ethnic groups, most of whom held other jobs with the railroad. During World War II, thousands of African Americans move into the Bay Area from the southern U.S. to work in the many local war industries, and many of them moved into the established community of African American railroad workers in West Oakland.

Prescott-Oakland Point

The name "Oakland Point" has been recently revived as part of an effort to re-develop West Oakland. It has been adopted by a community group called the Prescott-Oakland Point Neighborhood Association. Part of the redevelopment of the area includes, appropriately, partial restoration of the historic 16th Street Station. The station will however, not be put to any railroad use, but will become the centerpiece of a housing development known as Central Station.

== See also ==
- Oakland Long Wharf
- San Francisco and Oakland Railroad
- Alameda Mole
- Ferries of San Francisco Bay
