= Western Pacific Railroad (1862–1870) =

First railroad between Sacramento and Alameda/Oakland, California

- W.P.R.R.
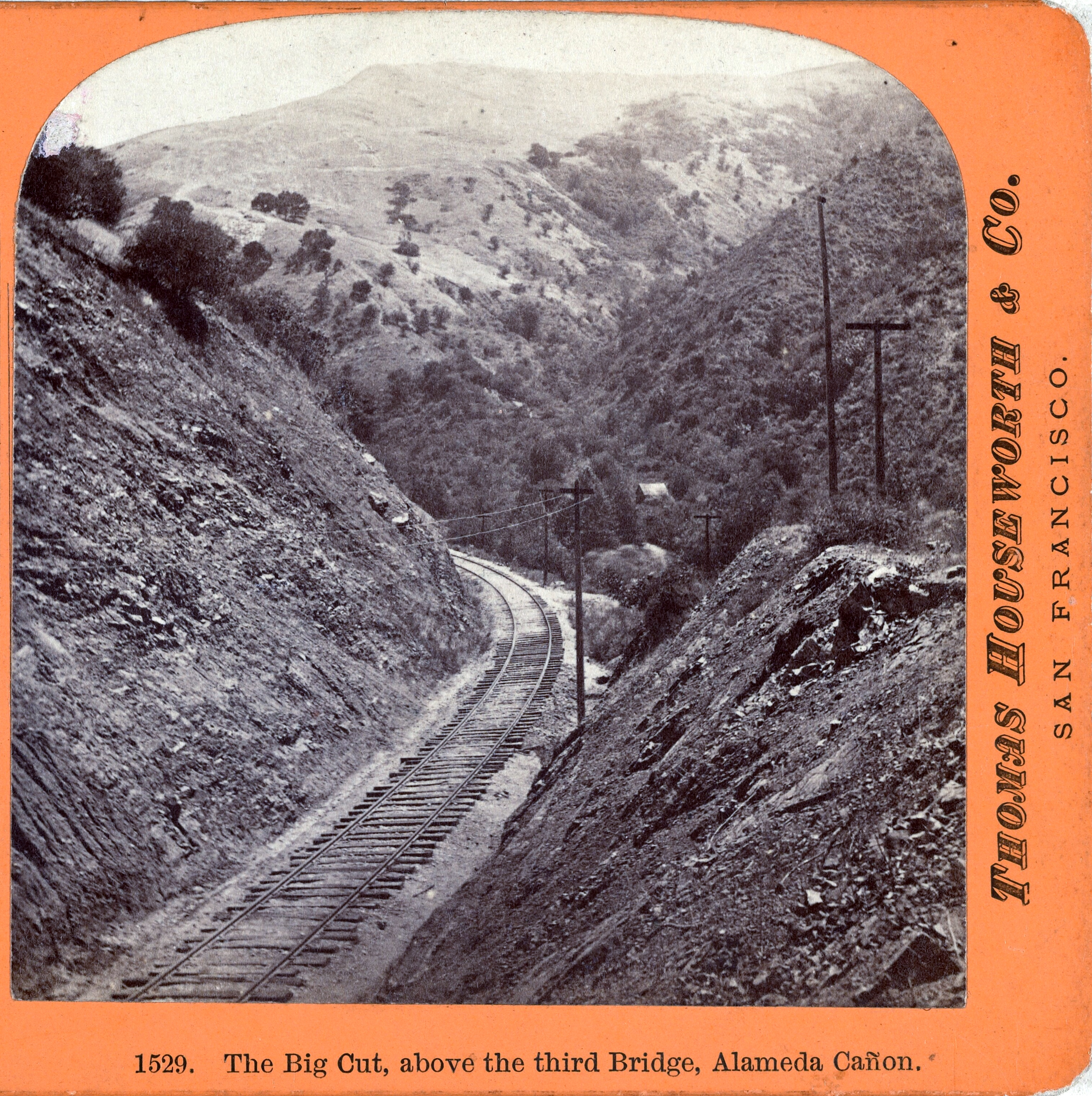
- The Big Cut, above the third [Farwell] Bridge, Alameda [Niles] Canyon, c1869.

Overview
- Locale: San Jose to Sacramento; Niles to Alameda/Oakland (San Francisco Bay Railroad)
- Dates of operation: 1864–1870; 156 years ago
- Successor: Central Pacific Railroad

Technical
- Track gauge: 4 ft 8 1/2 in (1,435 mm) standard gauge
- Length: 123 miles San Jose to Sacramento; 26.5 miles Niles to Oakland

The Western Pacific Railroad (1862–1870) was formed in 1862 to build a railroad from Sacramento, California, to the San Francisco Bay, the westernmost portion of the First transcontinental railroad. After the completion of the first railroad from Sacramento to Alameda Terminal on September 6, 1869, and then the Oakland Pier on November 8, 1869, which was the Pacific coast terminus of the transcontinental railroad, the Western Pacific Railroad was absorbed in 1870 into the Central Pacific Railroad.

== History ==
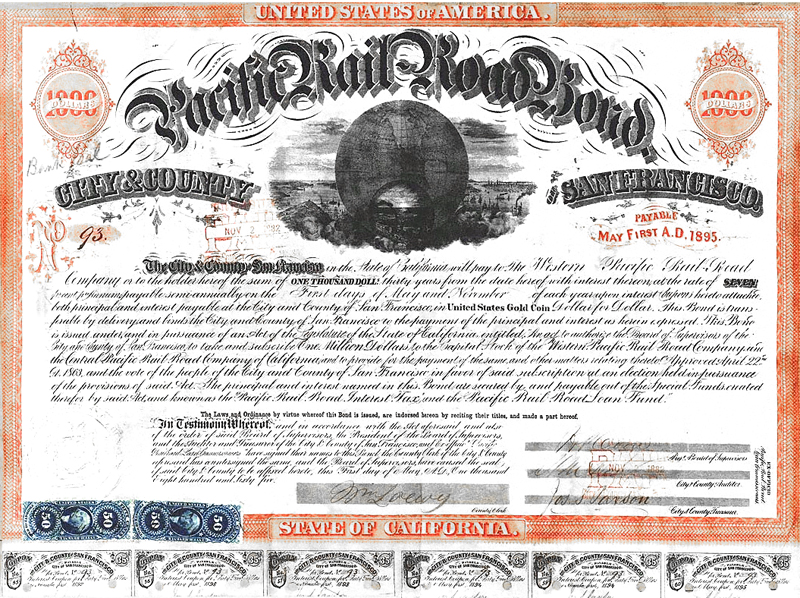
San Francisco Pacific Railroad Bond (WPRR), 1865

The Western Pacific Railroad (1862–1870) was formed in December 1862 by a group led by Timothy Dame and including Charles McLaughlin and Peter Donahue, all associated with the San Francisco and San Jose Railroad (SF&SJ), to build a railroad from San Jose north to Niles (then called Vallejo Mills), east through Niles Canyon (then called Alameda Cañon), north to Pleasanton, east through the Livermore Valley, and over Altamont Pass to Stockton, then north to Sacramento, with the plan that the transcontinental railroad would follow the Western Pacific to San Jose and then the SF&SJ to San Francisco.

At the completion of the SF&SJ in January 1864, it was reported that the general contract for the Western Pacific was awarded to McLaughlin & Houston and that negotiations for iron, equipment, and rolling stock had begun. On October 31, 1864, the Central Pacific Railroad assigned all the rights of the Pacific Railway Acts of 1862 and 1864 to the Western Pacific for the route between Sacramento and San Jose, including land grants. The amending Act of March 3, 1865 ratified and confirmed the assignment made by Central Pacific Railroad to Western Pacific Railroad and authorized Western Pacific Railroad as one of the charter companies.

=== Construction and transactions ===
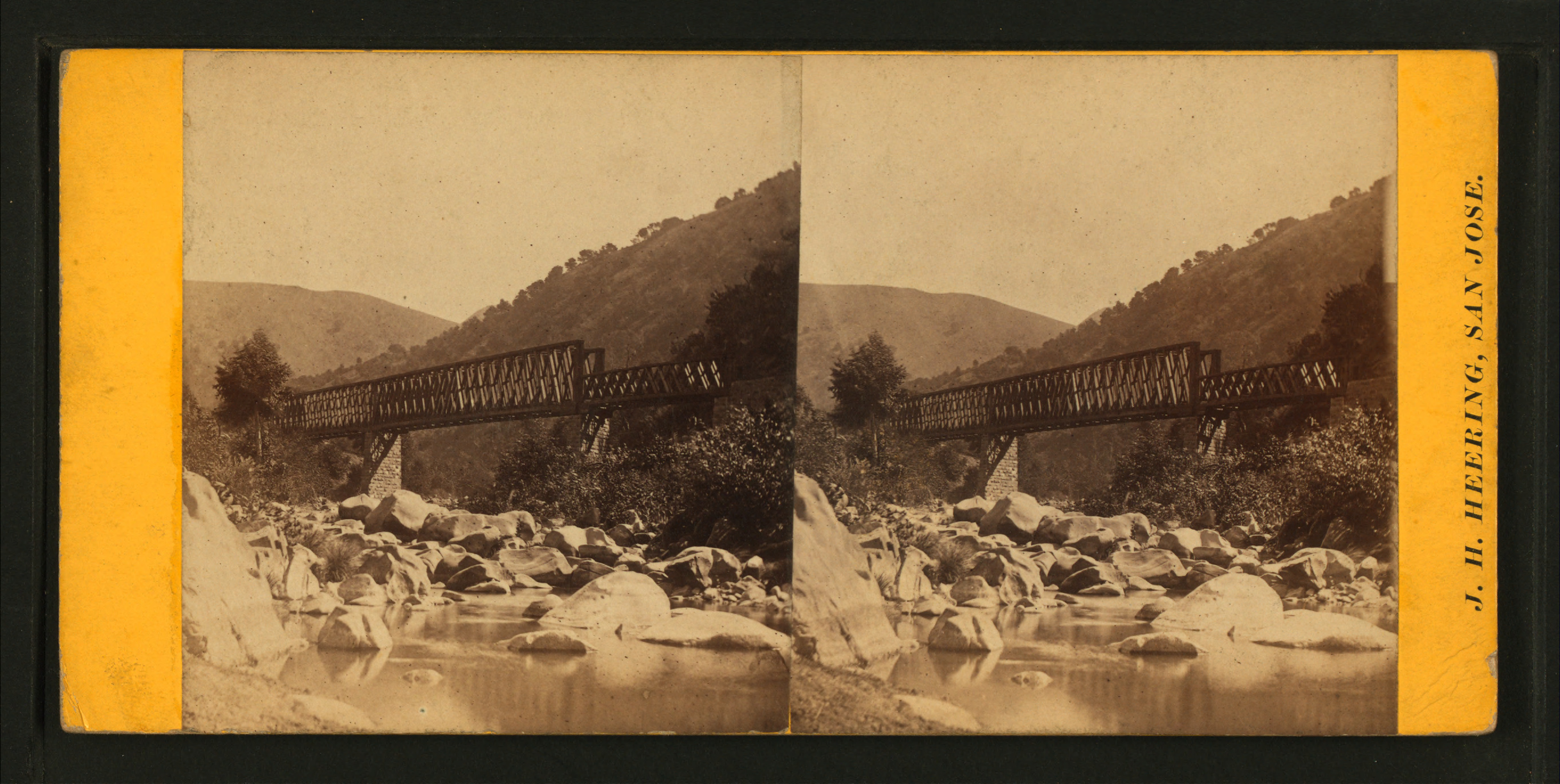
Farwell Bridge (c1866) over Alameda Creek in Alameda Cañon, from the Robert N. Dennis collection of stereoscopic views

The construction of the Western Pacific Railroad began in February 1865 near San Jose and northward under a contract taken by J.B. Cox & Myers. After Chinese laborers had helped complete the San Francisco and San Jose Railroad in 1864, a force of 500 Chinese laborers was grading the roadbed and laying tracks for the Western Pacific in 1865. By October 1866, Western Pacific completed 20 miles (32 km) of track north and east from San Jose, reaching halfway into Alameda Cañon (now Niles Canyon) to a point more than a mile beyond Farwell. The first cars left San Jose to Vallejo Canyon (Alameda Cañon) on October 2. It had also surveyed, and started work on some places on, the rest of the line through Alameda Cañon, through Livermore Valley, over Livermore Pass (now Altamont Pass), and on to Stockton and Sacramento, before running out of money and halting all construction. Part of the difficulty was that federal land grants were not available where Mexican land grants had previously been made.

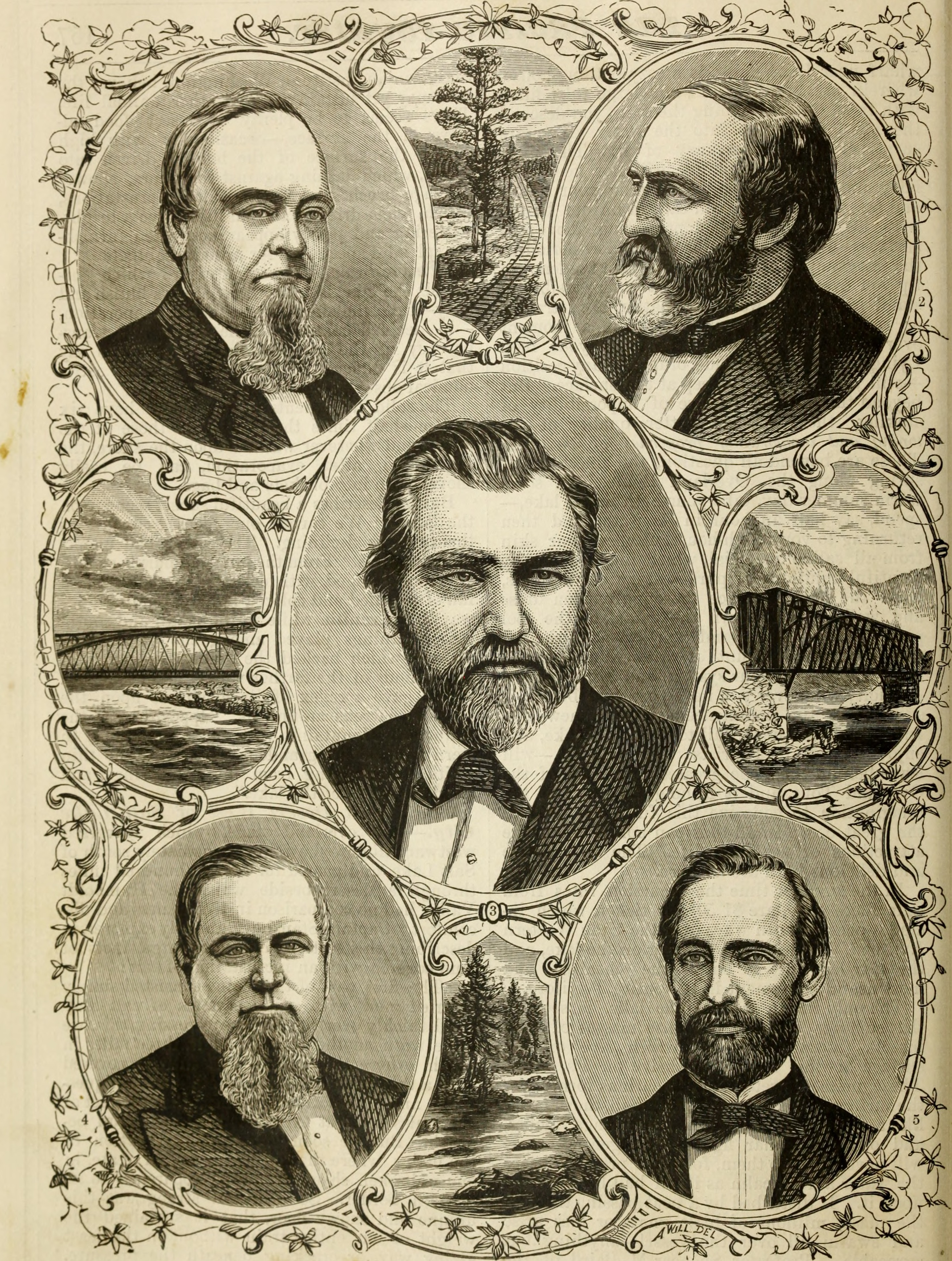
Five Associates of CPRR: l.—E. B. Crocker. 2.—C. P. Huntington. 3.—Leland Stanford. 4.—Charles Crocker. 5.—Mark Hopkins. From 1877 "The Pacific tourist"

In June 1867, the five Associates (Big Four plus E. B. Crocker) of the Central Pacific completed a complicated transaction with moribund Western Pacific (WP) and resuscitated it and its assets while Charles McLaughlin, the only Western Pacific owner left, retained rights to sell his land grants. In September 1867, Governor Stanford led Charles Crocker and Samuel Montague to show them the projected WP line, which would captured his interest that it would soon be dubbed "The Governor's Road". In October 1867, patterned after the structure of the ill-fated Crédit Mobilier of America, the Contract and Finance Company was incorporated to act as the stock/asset holding/laundering subsidiary formally independent of Central Pacific, but informally transferring stocks/assets back to the five CP Associates, to finance the construction and purchase of railroad.

In early 1868, contractors Turton, Knox & Ryan broke ground on the Western Pacific line from Sacramento southward to Stockton and beyond, including Livermore Pass. Meanwhile, Central Pacific concluded that the route via San Jose to San Francisco was too long and that it would be better to change to a route using ferryboats from the planned CPRR's Oakland Pier in Oakland. The decision to make Oakland the western terminus of the WP line was finally wrapped up, under the charge of Gov. Stanford, in a series of complex transactions and legislative compromise in April 1868. The CPRR briefly considered a shorter route west from Dublin/Pleasanton to the Hayward/San Leandro area (a route used by Bay Area Rapid Transit more than 100 years later), but decided that the grades were too much of a disadvantage compared to the 1% grade of the Alameda Cañon route.

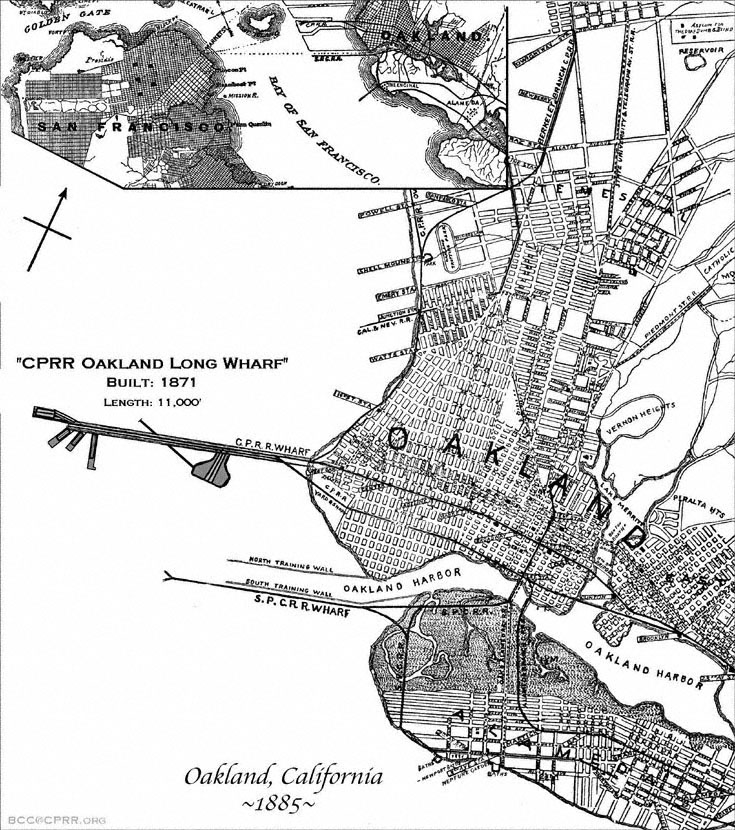
1885 map of Oakland and the CPRR's Long Wharf

Since Central Pacific had decided to make Oakland the west coast terminus of the First Transcontinental Railroad, its subsidiary purchased in August 1868 the majority of stock in San Francisco and Oakland Railroad (SF&O), which provided ferry-train service from a San Francisco ferry terminal connecting with railroad service through Oakland to San Antonio. After the 1868 Hayward earthquake bankrupted the San Francisco and Alameda Railroad (SF&A), the CP subsidiary also purchased in August 1869 the majority of stock in SF&A, which provided ferry service from San Francisco and train service from Alameda Terminal to the quake-damaged terminal at Hayward, California.

After the Central Pacific completed the western half of the first transcontinental railroad from Omaha to Sacramento with the golden spike ceremony on May 10, 1869, at Promontory Summit, J. H. Strobridge with some crew and equipment went to Vallejo Mills (now Niles) at the west end of Alameda Cañon to commence in June 1869 to build a new rail line from Vallejo Mills northward towards Oakland. Meanwhile, Turton, Knox & Ryan dispatched workers to continue the railroad in Alameda Cañon eastward from the point where the 1866 Western Pacific rails abruptly stopped.

By July 1869, Strobridge had 500 Chinese workers on the leg from Vallejo Mills towards Oakland. On the other two fronts, Turton, Knox & Ryan had a larger force of upwards of 2,000 men, mostly Chinese, some deployed working eastward from the middle of Alameda Cañon towards Livermore Pass and some working southward from Sacramento towards Stockton. This line included two engineering challenges: boring a 1,200 ft (370 m) tunnel through hard material near Livermore Pass and bridging the San Joaquin River at Mossdale south of Stockton.

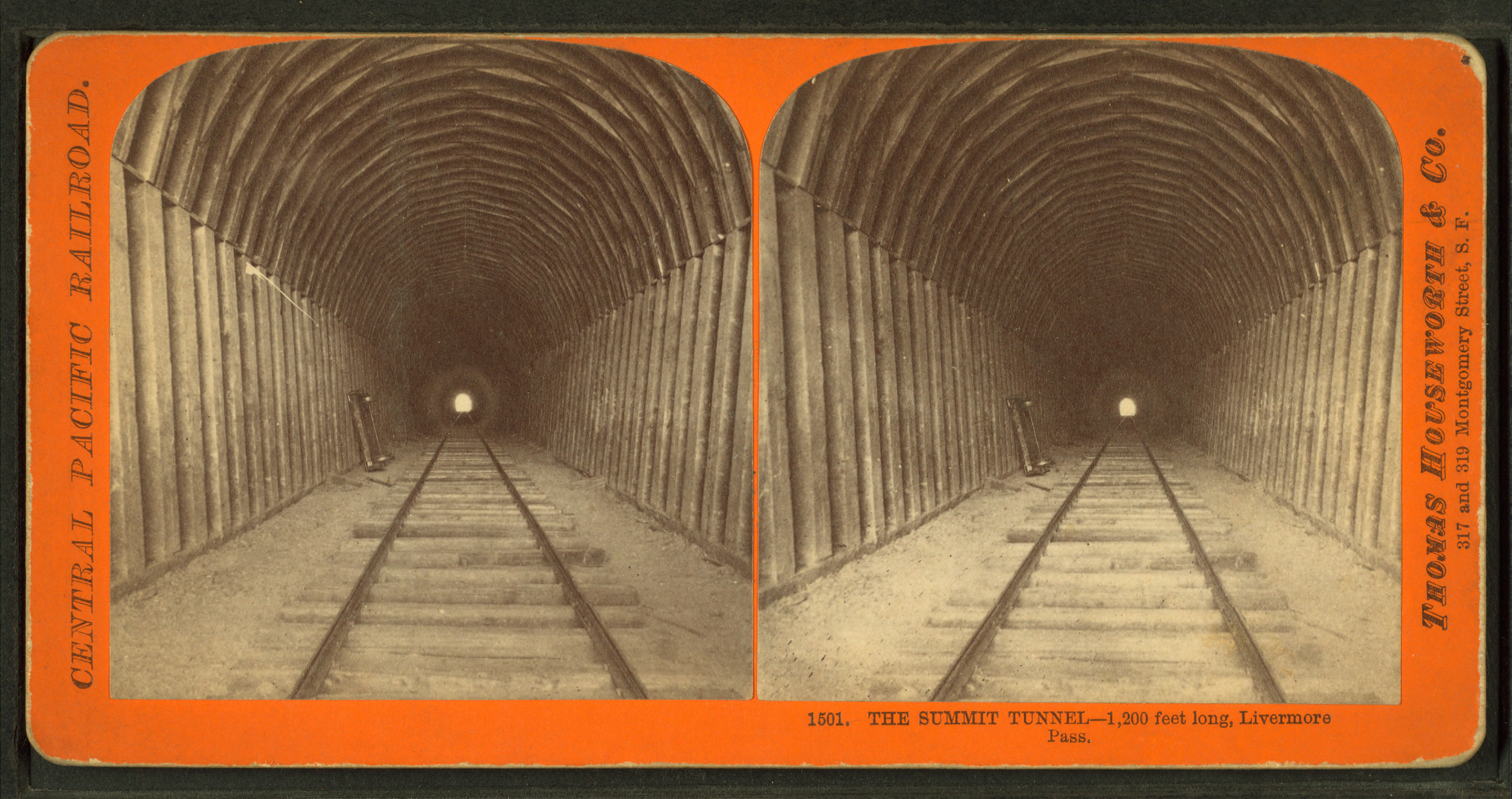
The Summit Tunnel, 1,200 feet (370 m) long, Livermore Pass, by Thomas Houseworth & Co.

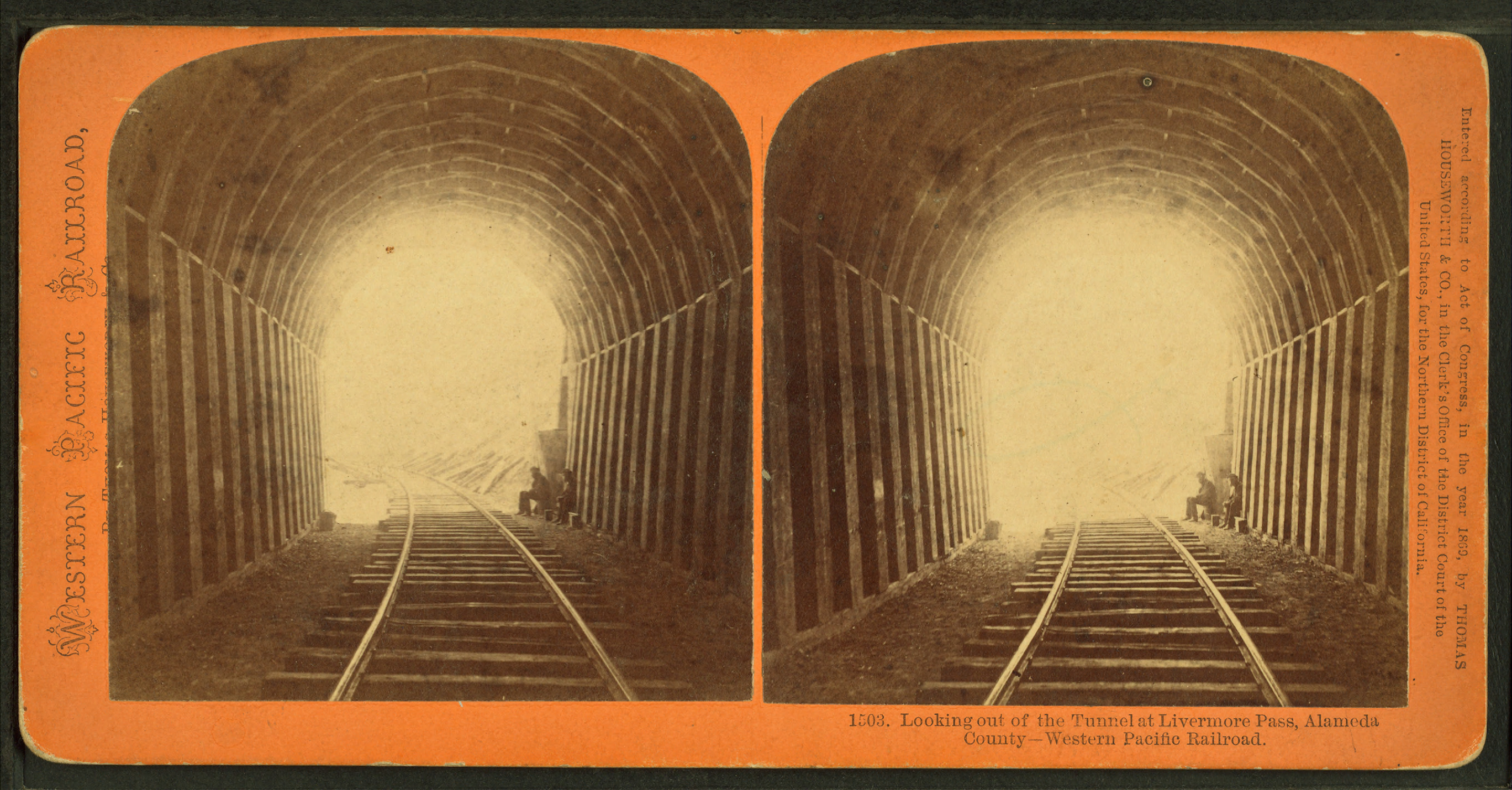
Looking out of the tunnel at Livermore Pass, Alameda County, Western Pacific Railroad, by Thomas Houseworth & Co.

According to a report from the Sacramento Bee, for tunnel work at Livermore Pass in July 1869, white men were paid $45 per month with board, whereas the Chinese were paid $37.50 per month and had to board themselves. The report went on to note that the Chinese "do more work, man for man, than the white men!" The report also noted: "The difference in price is, allowing $5 a week for board, $29 50 per month, and yet the men who receive the higher sum do less work than those who receive the lower!"

By mid-August 1869, the railroad was completed through Alameda Cañon eastward into Livermore valley. By the end of August, the tunnel at Livermore Pass was completed. The first passenger train passed through the tunnel on September 1, and a large force was working to finish the San Joaquin River railroad bridge, which became the controlling link of the line from Sacramento to San Francisco Bay.

=== Opening ===
By September 5, 1869, the railroad from Vallejo Mills (now Niles) to San Leandro was completed, including a connection at bay side of San Leandro to the existing tracks of SF&A, purchased a month before in August 1869, which led to the functioning Alameda Wharf. The next day on Monday, September 6, 1869, upon the completion of the San Joaquin River bridge at Mossdale in Lathrop, the first through train from Sacramento to reach San Francisco Bay arrived not at the CPRR's Oakland Pier but at the SF&A RR's Alameda Terminal that evening to a cheering crowd. Some of the passengers continued on the SF&A RR ferryboat Alameda to San Francisco. Upon the urging from Gov. Stanford, this opening of the railroad was pushed to completion in time to accommodate visitors to the 1869 California State Fair in Sacramento, which opened the same Monday.

The completion of the San Joaquin River railroad bridge at Lathrop and the first through train from Sacramento to Alameda on September 6, 1869, were commemorated by two California Historical Landmarks, in Lathrop CHL 780-7 and Alameda CHL 440, respectively.

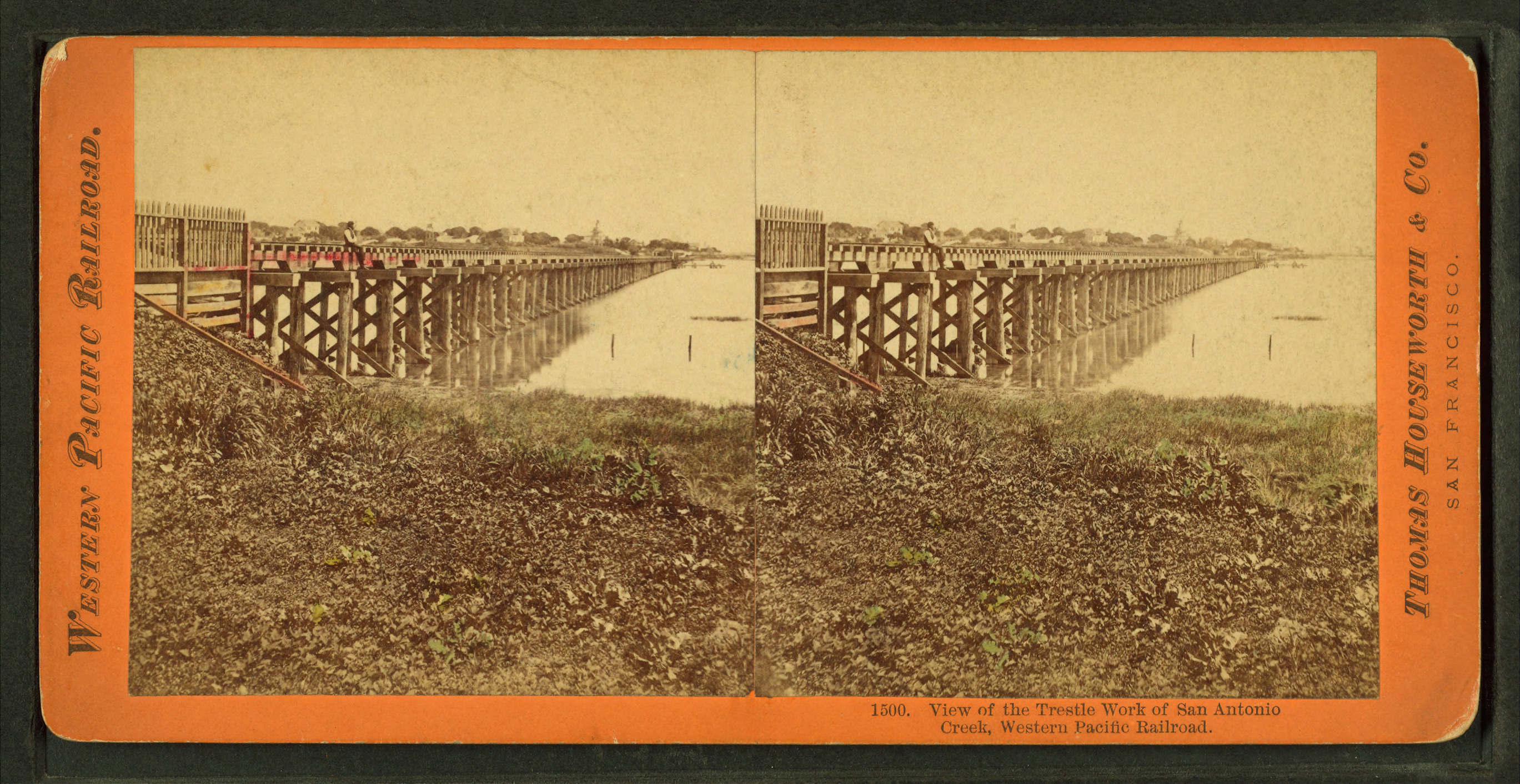
Trestle work of San Antonio Creek carried first Western Pacific train to Oakland - Nov 8, 1869

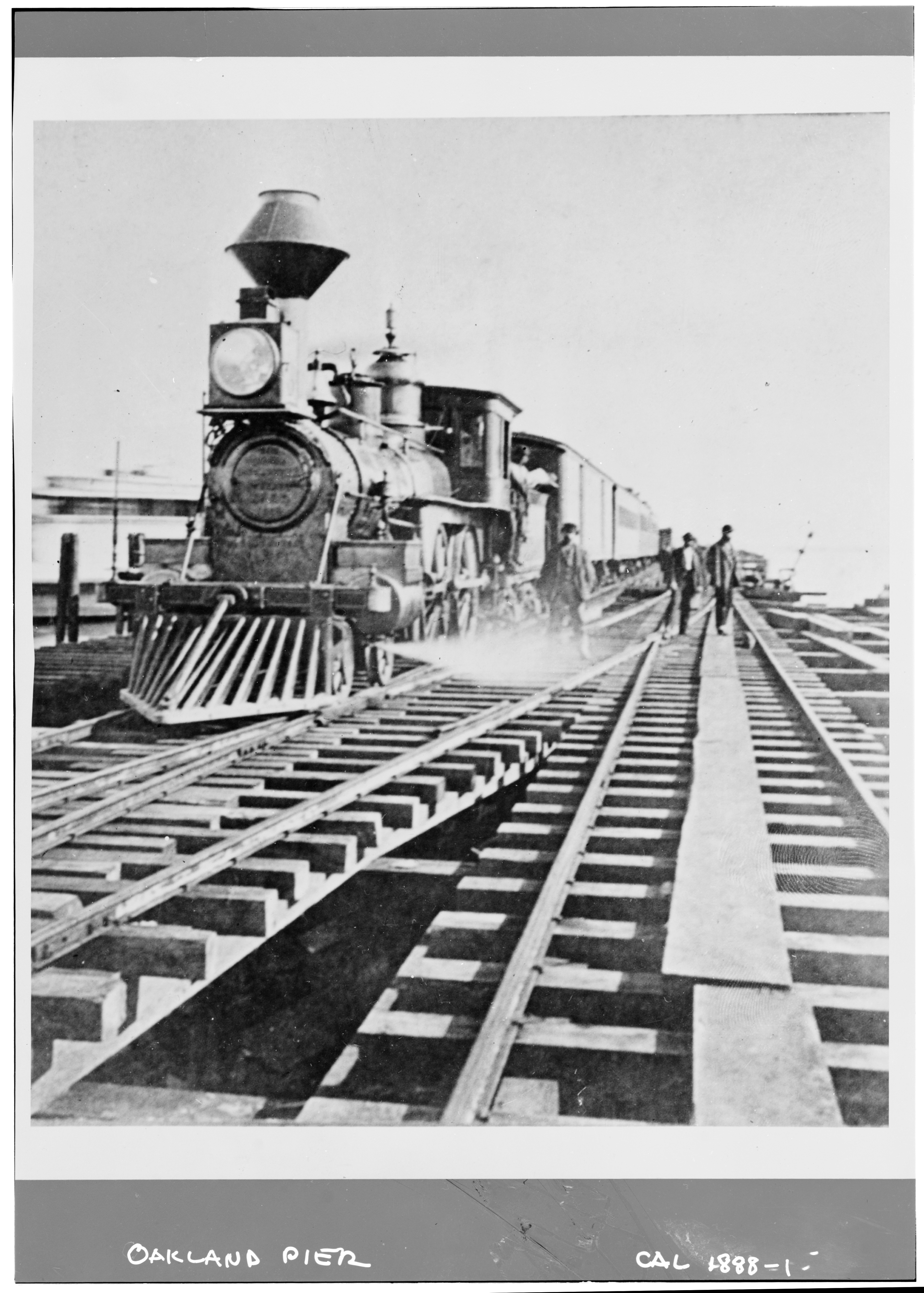
Oakland Point Pier, c1869 - used by first Western Pacific train to transfer passengers from Oakland to San Francisco - November 8, 1869

Two months later, the rail connection to the San Francisco and Oakland Railroad was finally in place, as was the expansion of CPRR's Oakland Pier. On the morning of November 8, 1869, the first transcontinental train to use the expanded ferry terminal at Oakland Pier traversed the SF&O and the Western Pacific Railroad to reach Sacramento, and continue eastward on the Central Pacific Railroad. The city of Oakland held a large celebration later in the day to greet the first westbound transcontinental train. Newspaper coverage stated: "New York and Oakland are bound together by ties strapped with iron."

After November 1869, the Oakland Pier was the Pacific coast terminus of the transcontinental trains. Alameda then reverted to local train service and in 1873 the original SF&A pier was abandoned.

=== Locomotives ===
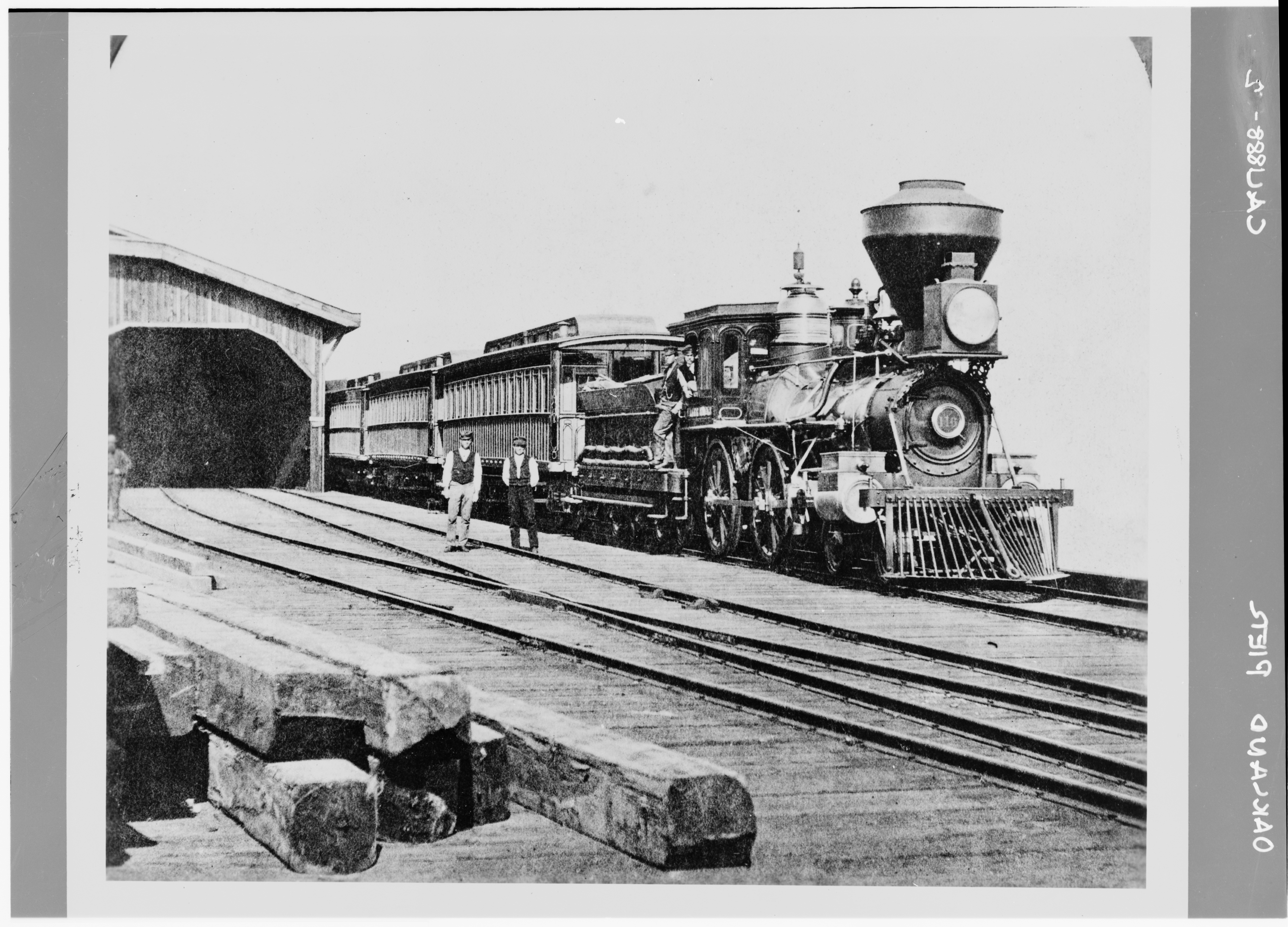
Locomotive at 1869 Oakland Point Pier - before construction of Long Wharf

The Western Pacific operated a total of ten locomotives. The first five were built in 1864 by the Norris Locomotive Works plant at Lancaster, Pennsylvania. One of these was a 12-ton 4-2-0 while the others were of the more conventional 4-4-0 type weighing from 30 to 33 tons. Baldwin Locomotive Works of Philadelphia built three more 30-ton 4-4-0 locomotives in 1866, and two similar locomotives were built by Mason Machine Works of Massachusetts in 1867.

The locomotive Mariposa, lettered G, was built by the Norris Locomotive Works in 1864. Sold in 1914 by the Southern Pacific to Stockton Terminal & Eastern #1. Currently on display at the Travel Town Museum in Griffith Park, Los Angeles, California. the only surviving locomotive of the original Western Pacific.

=== Changes ===
In 1870, the Western Pacific Railroad dissolved, and its routes absorbed by the Central Pacific Railroad. Maps thereafter would show the Western Pacific route as one for the CPRR.

In 1879, the Central Pacific shortened its route from Sacramento to the Oakland Pier by building a line from Sacramento to Benicia, crossing the Carquinez Strait there via large train ferry, the Solano and Contra Costa, to Port Costa, then along the south shore of Carquinez Strait and San Pablo Bay to Richmond, Berkeley, and Oakland to the Oakland Pier. From 1879 on, the original 1862–1869 WP route through Altamont Pass and Niles Canyon became a secondary route between the East Bay and the San Joaquin Valley.

In 1930, the Solano and Contra Costa train ferry service was discontinued, and train traffic traveled into the Bay Area via the new steel Benicia-Martinez Bridge spanning the Carquinez Strait from Benicia to Martinez. This bridge continues in operation today.

In 1888, the Central Pacific routes were absorbed by the Southern Pacific Railroad.

=== Monuments ===
- California Historical Landmark No. 780.7 Transcontinental Railroad- Site of Completion of Pacific Railroad at entrance to Mossdale Crossing Park and Ramp, just north of San Joaquin River in Lathrop, California. Plaque is missing. The plaque erroneously used September 8, 1869 as date of completion instead of September 6, 1869.

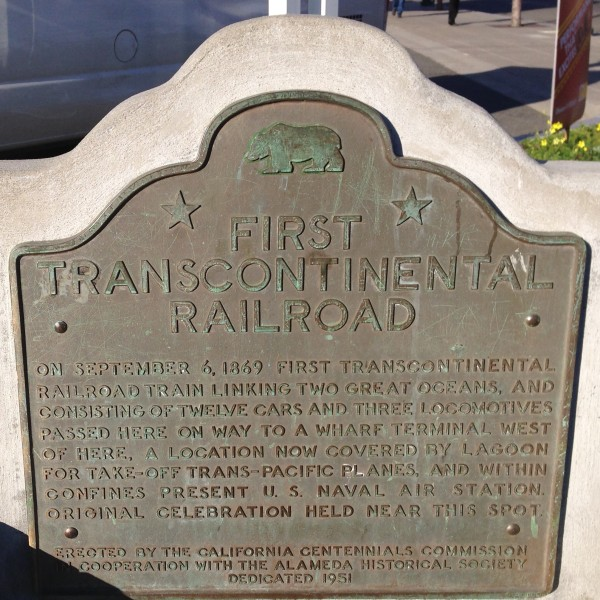
California Historical Landmark #440 in Alameda, CA

- California Historical Landmark No. 440 Alameda Terminal of Transcontinental Railroad on the NW corner of Lincoln Ave. and Webster St. in Alameda, California.

== The new Western Pacific Railroad ==
In 1903, to compete with the Southern Pacific Railroad, a new Western Pacific Railway Company was formed to build routes between Oakland, San Jose, Sacramento, Stockton, and Salt Lake City. East of Sacramento, the new Western Pacific Railway routes closely paralleled the Southern Pacific's legacy routes from the 1862 Western Pacific Railroad.

In 1916, the Western Pacific Railway Company was dissolved in bankruptcy. Its assets, including its 1903 route, were acquired by a new business entity, The Western Pacific Railroad Company.

In 1979, the Southern Pacific obtained trackage rights over the 1903 route from its old rival, The Western Pacific Railroad Company. Consequently, it abandoned the original 1862 Western Pacific Railroad route over Altamont Pass to Niles, except for a section between Pleasanton, California, through Niles Canyon, to the Niles District in Fremont, California. Other sections of the 1903 route are still operated by the Altamont Corridor Express, and the Union Pacific Railroad.

In 1984, Southern Pacific deeded the Pleasanton - Niles right-of-way to Alameda County, California. Since 1988, the Niles Canyon Railway has continuously operated a tourist railroad to preserve the history of the Western Pacific Railroad (1862–1870), on the route that completed the first transcontinental railroad to the Pacific coast.

== See also ==
- Central Pacific Railroad
- San Francisco and Alameda Railroad
- San Francisco and Oakland Railroad
- Niles Canyon Railway
