= Central Pacific Railroad Depot (Oakland) =

Former railway station in Oakland, California

Oakland
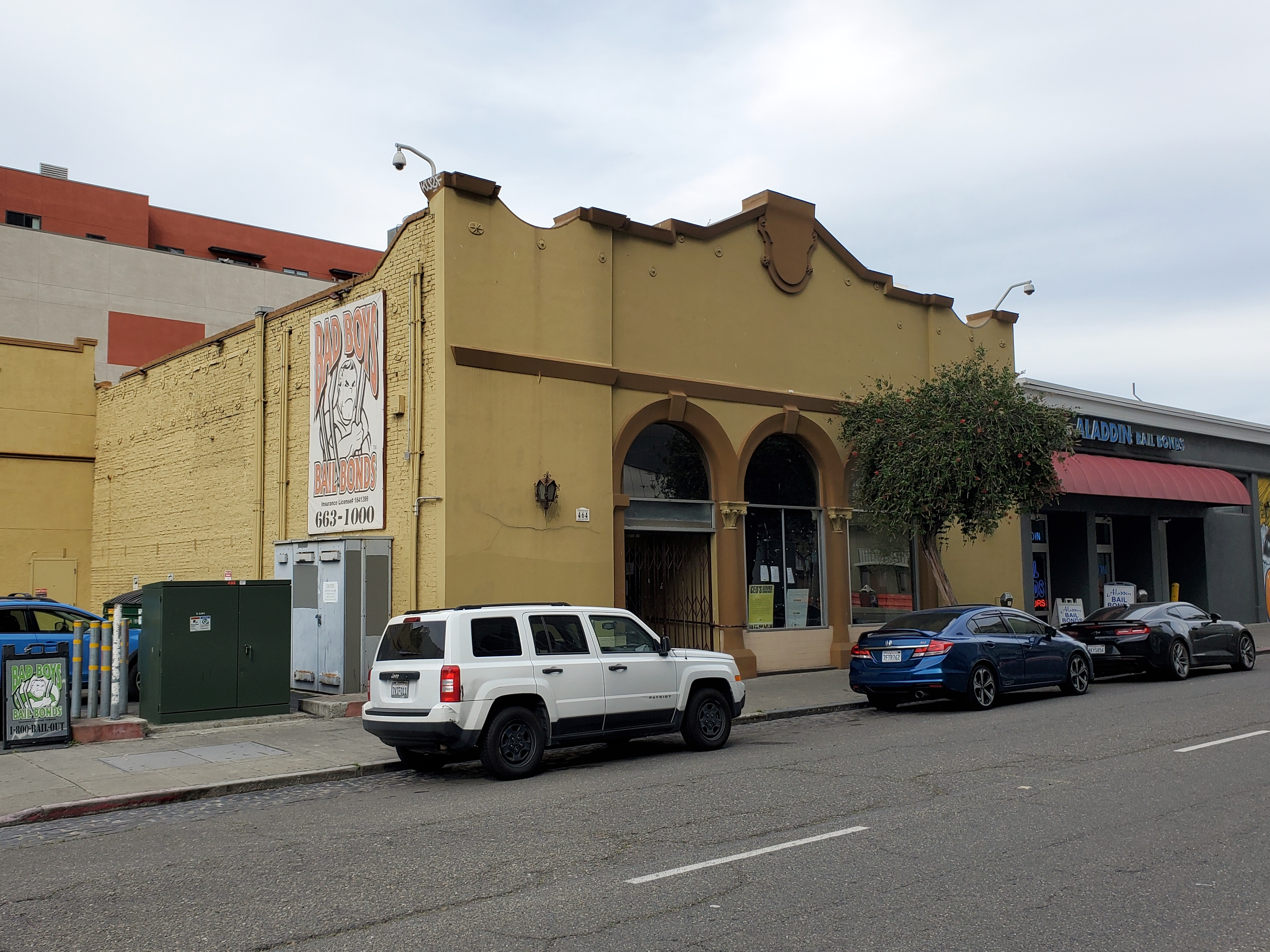
- The former station in April 2021

General information
- Location: 464 7th Street, Oakland, California
- Coordinates: 37.799863°N 122.274693°W

Services
| Preceding station | Southern Pacific Railroad | Following station |
|---|---|---|
| 7th Street and Market Street toward Transbay Terminal | 7th Street Line | 7th Street and Oak Street toward San Leandro–Dutton Avenue |

Oakland Designated Landmark
- Designated: 1982
- Reference no.: 65
Location

The Central Pacific Railroad Depot is a former rail station located in Oakland, California on 7th Street west of Broadway. Originally serving as the western terminal of the San Francisco and Oakland Railroad, the Central Pacific Railroad chose the line as the final link of their transcontinental route and acquired the line and station in 1869. Southern Pacific began operating the line in 1885, and most traffic was rerouted to the 16th Street station when that facility opened in 1912. An additional track was added at some point and both electrified for use in the Key System. A stop continued to operate out front, but the station building had been converted to the Mi Rancho Tortilla Factory in 1939. Tracks were removed with the dismantling of the system.

The building was evaluated for inclusion on the National Register of Historic Places in 1994, however was deemed unlikely to qualify due to changes on the facade.

== See also ==
- Western Pacific Depot – the 3rd Street Oakland station
- Oakland–Jack London Square station – modern Amtrak station
