= Alameda Mole =

Former passenger ferry and train pier in California

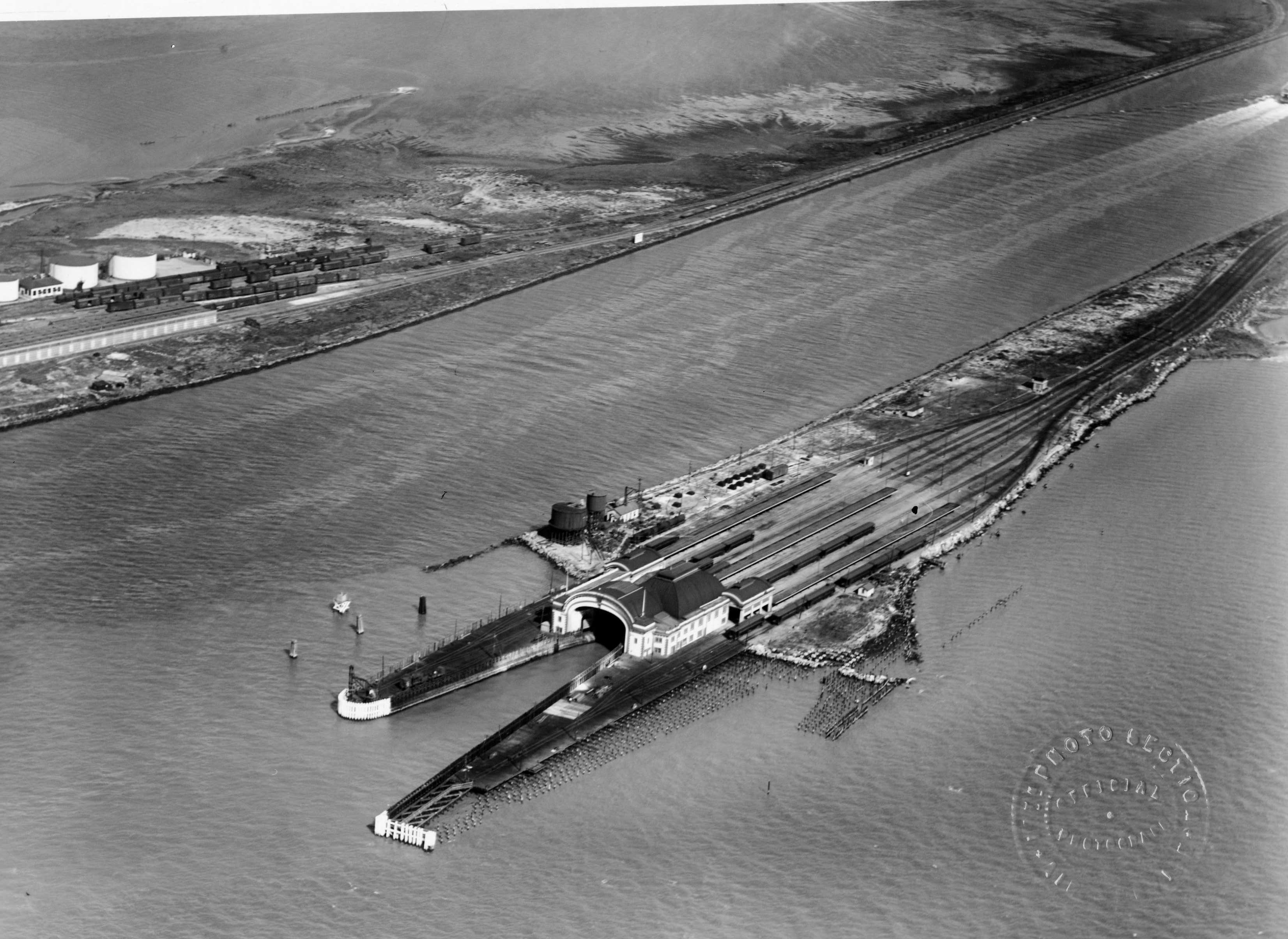

General information
- Location: Alameda, California
- Coordinates: 37.796°N 122.329°W

History
- Opened: June 1, 1878
- Closed: 1939 (ferries)

Services
| Preceding station | Southern Pacific Railroad | Following station |
|---|---|---|
| Terminus | South Pacific Coast Railroad | Park Street toward Santa Cruz |
| Terminus | Alameda — Oakland | Alameda Point toward 14th Street |
| Terminus | Lincoln Avenue Line | Alameda Airport toward Oakland Pier |
| Terminus | Encinal Avenue Line | Alameda Airport toward Oakland Pier |
| San Francisco Ferry Building Terminus | Connection to San Francisco via Ferry | Terminus |
Location

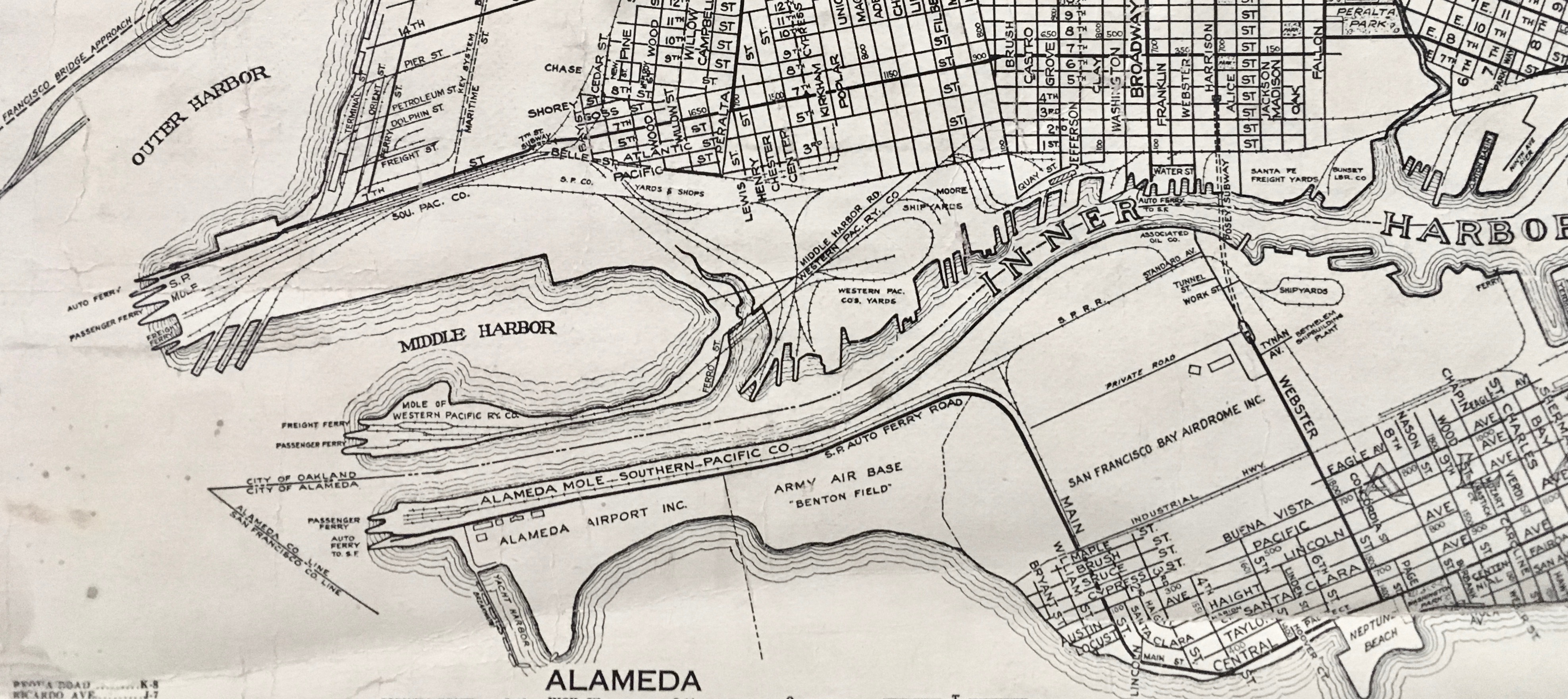
Alameda Mole 1937

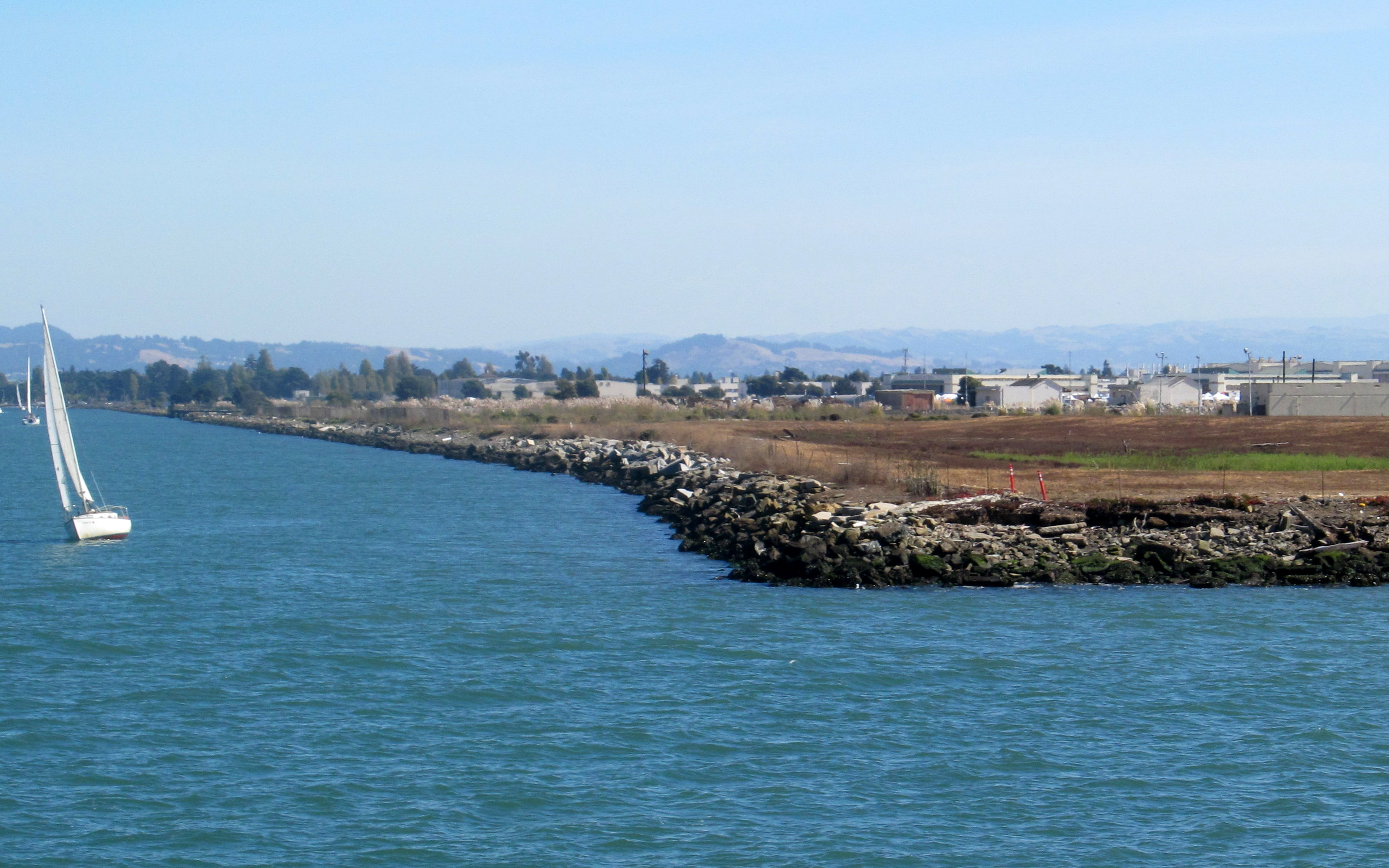
Remains of the Alameda Mole on the former NAS Alameda in 2017

The Alameda Mole was a transit and transportation facility in Alameda, California for ferries landing in the East Bay of San Francisco from 1878 to the 1930s. It was located on the west end of Alameda, and later became part of the Alameda Naval Air Station. It was one of four neighboring moles. The others were the Oakland Mole, the WP Mole (Western Pacific), and the Key System Mole. The purpose of the mole was to extend tracks of rail-based transportation lines beyond the shallow mud flats along the shore of the East Bay into water deep enough to accommodate the passenger and rail ferries to San Francisco.

== History ==
The mole was originally built by the South Pacific Coast Railroad between 1876 and 1878 to serve as the northern terminal of its narrow-gauge railroad to Santa Cruz. Combined rail-ferry service commenced on June 1, 1878. The Southern Pacific acquired the mole by lease in 1887. The mole burned to the water on November 20, 1902 and was rebuilt larger and farther out into the bay. It was dual gauged (both narrow and standard gauge) starting in 1898 and fully standard gauged after 1906.

Oakland's worst railroad disaster of the nineteenth century occurred on the Alameda Mole on May 30, 1890. A Southern Pacific Railroad passenger train headed for Oakland fell into the estuary after failing to stop for the open drawbridge at Webster Street. The drawbridge had been opened to allow a ship to pass. Thirteen people were killed and many injured.

The Alameda Mole was used by: (i) local trolley cars (such as the Red Line), (ii) ferries to San Francisco, (iii) regular trains running in a horseshoe-pattern (dubbed the Horseshoe Line) to the Oakland Mole, (iv) local steam commuter lines of the Southern Pacific Railroad (initially, the narrow gauge South Pacific Coast Railroad — later the standard gauge Southern Pacific Railroad) which were later transformed into the East Bay Electric Lines. Southern Pacific's electrified trains were not streetcars, but full-sized railroad cars which connected to the mainland by bridges at Webster Street and Fruitvale. The trains ran to both the Oakland Mole and the Alameda Mole. Ferry service ended in 1939 with the opening of and rerouting of all transbay service across the San Francisco–Oakland Bay Bridge. Transbay passengers from Alameda were then forced to travel outbound to cross the Fruitvale Bridge before continuing through Oakland to the new bridge. Red trains ceased service in 1941.

In the 1930s Pan American Airways established a seaplane port along the fill that led to the Alameda Mole. This was the original home base for the China Clipper. With the advent of World War II, a vast stretch of the marshy area southwest of the Alameda Mole was filled and the Naval Air Station Alameda established. This major Naval facility included a large airfield and docks for several aircraft carriers. It closed in 1997.

== See also ==
- Alameda Terminal
- Ferries of San Francisco Bay
- Oakland Long Wharf
