= Niles Canyon =

Geographic feature in California, United States

Niles Canyon Alameda Canyon
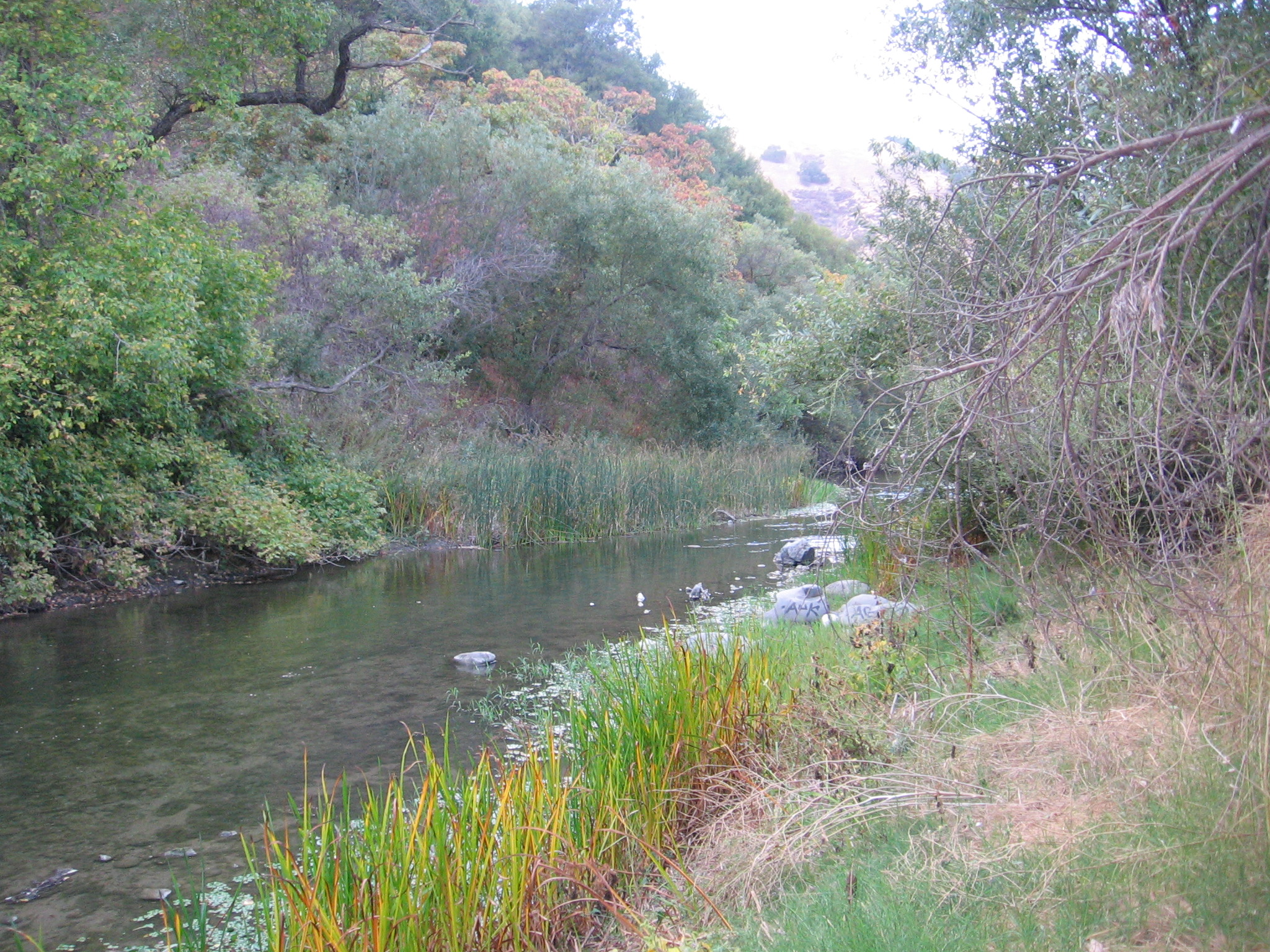
- Alameda Creek in Niles Canyon
- Native name: Cañada Molina Vallejo (Spanish)

Location
- Country: United States
- State: California
- Region: Alameda County

Physical characteristics
- Source
  - location: at Sunol, California
  - coordinates: 37°35′40″N 121°53′56″W
- Mouth
  - location: at Niles, California
  - coordinates: 37°34′50″N 121°57′55″W
  - elevation: 82 ft (25 m)

Niles Canyon is a canyon in the San Francisco Bay Area formed by Alameda Creek, known for its heritage railroad and silent movie history. The canyon is largely in an unincorporated area of Alameda County, while the western portion of the canyon lies within the city limits of Fremont and Union City. The stretch of State Route 84 known as Niles Canyon Road traverses the length of the canyon from the Niles district of Fremont to the unincorporated town of Sunol.

Two railroads also follow the same route down the canyon from Sunol to Niles: the old Southern Pacific track along the north side, now the Niles Canyon Railway, and the newer Union Pacific (formerly the Western Pacific) track a little to the south. At the west end of the canyon are the ruins of the Vallejo Flour Mill, which dates to 1853.

== History ==
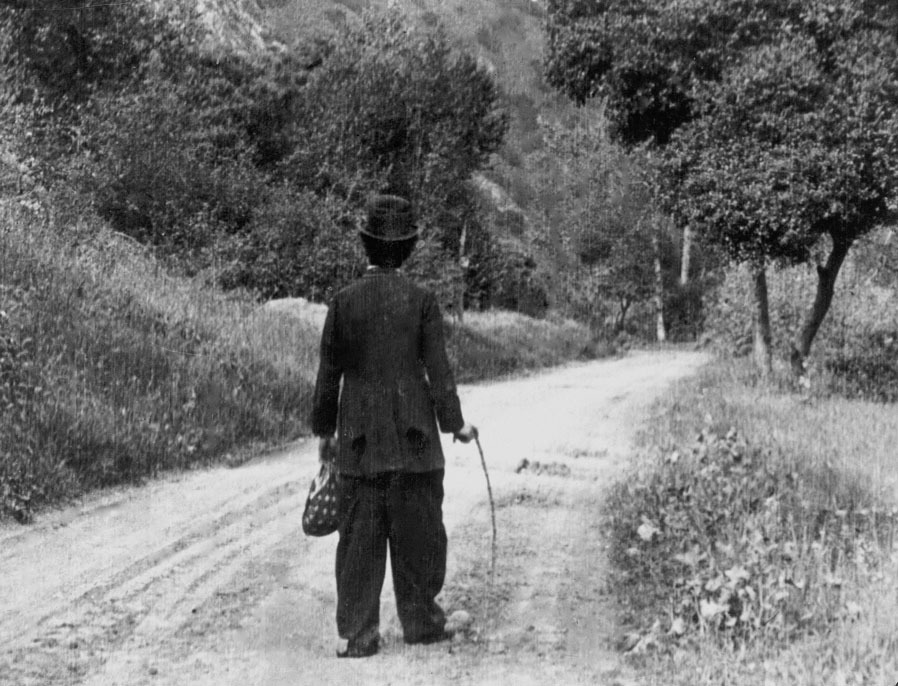
Charlie Chaplin as The Tramp (1915) near the west end of Niles Canyon Road.

The route of El Camino Viejo a Los Ángeles (Old Road to Los Angeles), the oldest north-south trail in the interior of Alta California, ran through Niles Canyon. In addition, the canyon, then known as Alameda Cañon, was located in three different Mexican land grants - Rancho Arroyo de la Alameda, Rancho Ex-Mission San José, and Rancho Valle de San Jose.

It was later named Cañada Molina Vallejo for the two-story adobe grist mill built in the early 1840s on the Rancho Arroyo de la Alameda near the mouth of the canyon by its owner José de Jesús Vallejo, elder brother of Mariano Guadalupe Vallejo. The locality became known as Vallejo's Mill and later as Vallejo's Mills when Vallejo built a second wooden three story mill next to the original adobe mill in 1856. The area later became the town of Niles, named after the Niles Station, which was built after the first transcontinental railroad was completed through the canyon by Western Pacific Railroad (1862-1870) in the Summer of 1869. The station was named after Central Pacific Railroad attorney Addison C. Niles, later a California Supreme Court judge. The Thompson & West map shows that the area was still known as Niles or Vallejo Mills in 1878 with the Contract & Finance Co., a subsidiary of Central Pacific, still in ownership of the later town of Niles.

The railroad through Alameda Cañon to Pleasanton was completed August 15, 1869 and to Laddsville on August 18, 1869. The first through train from Sacramento to Alameda Terminal (the first terminus of the Transcontinental Railroad) ran through Alameda Cañon on September 6, 1869. As Niles became known as a picnic day-tripper destination around 1900, the name Niles Canyon replaced Alameda Cañon.

Essanay Film Manufacturing Company, an early motion picture company, had a studio and back lot located in Niles from 1912–1916 at the canyon's western mouth. The canyon was featured in many early films, some by Broncho Billy and it was here that Charlie Chaplin filmed one of his most iconic movies, The Tramp. The Niles Essanay Silent Film Museum has exhibits, screenings, and events remembering its heritage.

The abandoned Sunol Aqueduct runs through the canyon. The aqueduct, built in the 1920s, formerly provided half the water supply to San Francisco before it was replaced by the Hetch Hetchy Aqueduct.

== Railroads ==
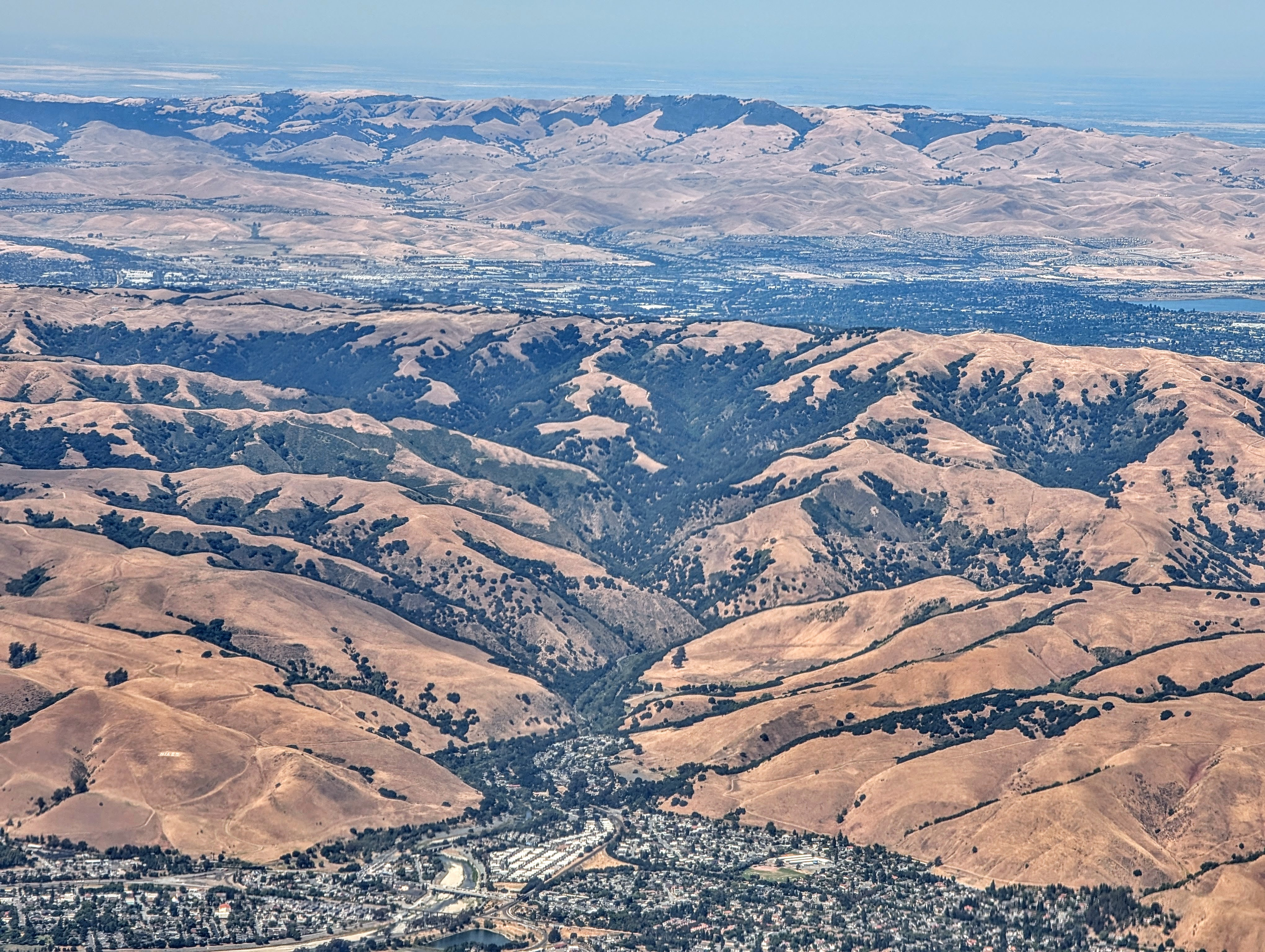
Aerial view of Niles Canyon, with Niles Canyon Mobile Estates and Alameda Creek in center foreground, and the Tri-Valley and the Diablo Range in the background

The Union Pacific Railroad (formerly Western Pacific Railroad) has an active mainline on the south side of the canyon, the Oakland Subdivision. The Altamont Corridor Express runs along this line on weekdays and Saturdays. The former Southern Pacific route from Oakland to Tracy via Niles Canyon is now abandoned, except for the portion from Sunol to Niles Station operated by the heritage railway known as the Niles Canyon Railway. This line was the original westernmost section of the First transcontinental railroad from Sacramento to San Francisco Bay (by way of Stockton and the Altamont Pass). It was completed in September 1869 by the Western Pacific Railroad (1862–1870), but lost its transcontinental traffic in 1879 to a shorter route through Benicia. The Southern Pacific tracks in Niles Canyon are on the north side of the canyon. Southern Pacific, being the first railroad in the canyon, chose the best route. Therefore, when the Western Pacific tracks were laid through the canyon in 1905 to 1908, they were left with a more difficult challenge. This forced Western Pacific engineers to bore two tunnels and construct a steel bridge to lay their tracks. When driving the longer of the two tunnels, two gangs of excavators worked on it, one driving the tunnel from the east end and the other from the west end. The excavators drove about 100 feet (30 m) per month.

== See also ==
- Sunol Water Temple
- Niles Canyon ghost
