= Luis Antonio Argüello =

Californio politician (1784–1830)

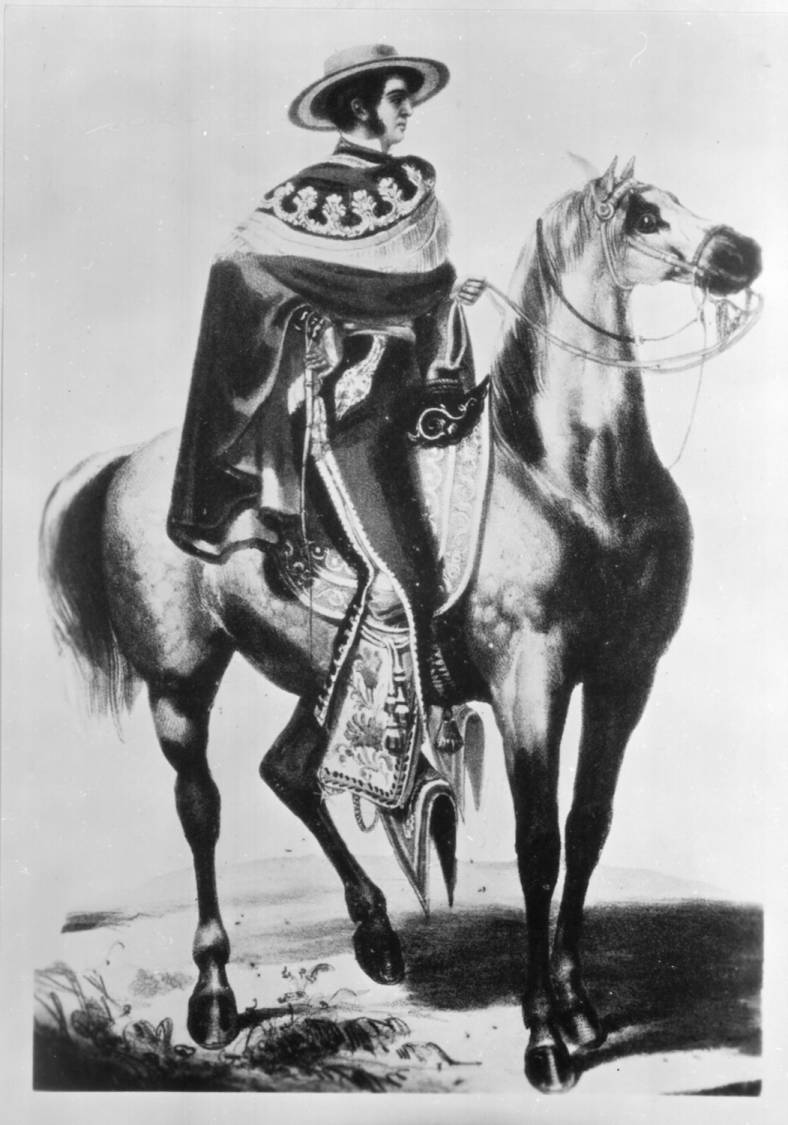
- Portrait of Luis Antonio Argüello held by the Huntington Library in San Marino, California

3rd Governor of Alta California
- In office 1822–1825
- Preceded by: Pablo Vicente de Solá
- Succeeded by: José María de Echeandía

Personal details
- Born: June 21, 1784 Presidio Real de San Francisco, Las Californias, New Spain
- Died: March 27, 1830 (aged 45) Yerba Buena, Alta California, First Mexican Republic (now San Francisco, California, U.S.)
- Spouse(s): María Angela Berreyesa, María Soledad Ortega de Argüello
- Profession: Explorer, politician, soldier

Luis Antonio Argüello (Spanish pronunciation: [ˈlwis anˈtonjo aɾˈɣweʎo]; June 21, 1784 – March 27, 1830) was the first Californio (native-born) governor of Alta California, and the first to take office under Mexican rule. He was the only governor to serve under the First Mexican Empire (of 1821–1823) and also served as acting governor under the subsequent provisional government, which preceded the First Mexican Republic (of 1824–1835).

== Biography ==
Argüello was born at Presidio of San Francisco (in present-day San Francisco), Alta California, to José Darío Argüello and Maria Ygnacia Moraga, members of one of the most distinguished and influential families in early California history. His father founded the Pueblo de Los Angeles, and served as Governor of Alta California and later of Baja California.

In August, 1806, Argüello succeeded his father as Commandant of California with the rank of lieutenant. In 1821, he launched an exploration of Northern California to investigate the rumors of "Foreigners" setting up a base. Argüello published his expedition diary, titled The Diary of Captain Arguello: The Last Spanish Expedition in California, October 17 - November 17, 1821. He ordered retribution on hunters of the Russian-American Company who were catching sea otters in San Francisco Bay. There were numerous sea otter populations to hunt and a lack of Spanish military posts above San Francisco Bay made it hard for Argüello to stop this northern activity and the possibility of them trading with the Spanish Missions.

His brother was Santiago Argüello, who was commandant of the Presidio of San Diego and alcalde (mayor) of Pueblo de San Diego. His sister Concepción Argüello (1791–1857) was noted for her romance with Nikolai Rezanov (1764–1807), a Russian promoter of the colonization of Alaska and California.

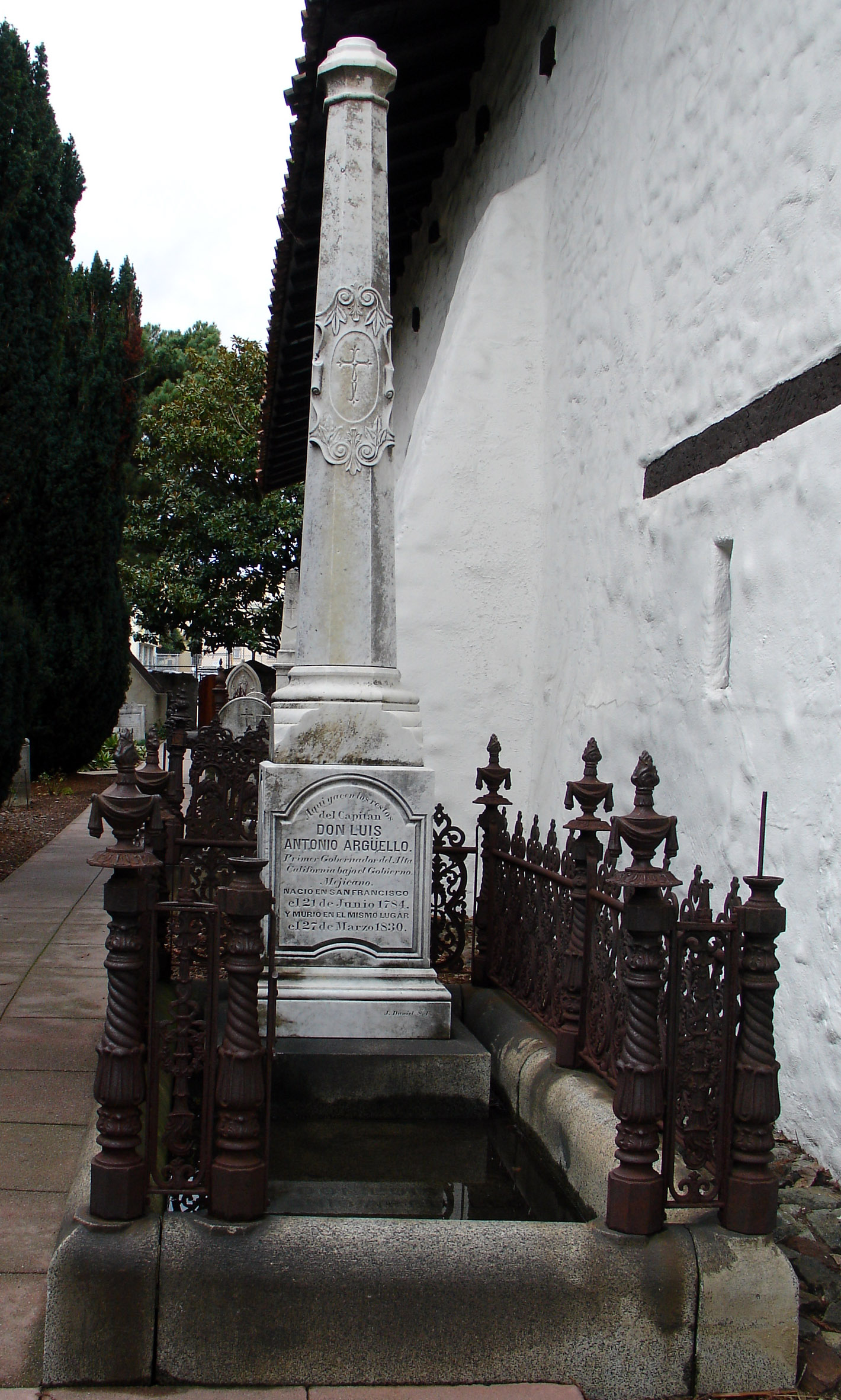
Grave of Luís Antonio Argüello at Mission San Francisco de Asís (Mission Dolores) cemetery, San Francisco.

Argüello and his second wife María Soledad Ortega de Argüello inherited his parents 35,240-acre (142.6 km^{2}) Spanish Rancho land grant of 1795 named Rancho de las Pulgas, encompassing present day San Mateo, Belmont, San Carlos, Redwood City, Atherton, and Menlo Park. Though Luis never actually lived there, his widow and children settled there after his death.

Josefa Arguello was one of his daughters, she married Eulogio de Celis, their son Eulogio F. de Celis became a predominant landowner in the San Fernando Valley.

Luis Antonio Argüello died in Yerba Buena (San Francisco) in 1830, and is buried at the Mission San Francisco de Asís (Mission Dolores) cemetery.

== Governor ==
In 1822, William Edward Petty Hartnell persuaded Argüello to grant him the right to do business in any port in Alta California, whereas other foreigners were restricted to Monterey and San Diego.

Mariano Guadalupe Vallejo was served as the personal secretary to the new Governor Luis Argüello, when news of Mexico's independence reached Monterey. Argüello enrolled Vallejo as a cadet in the Presidio company in 1824. After being promoted to corporal, Argüello appointed Vallejo to the diputación, the territorial legislature. He was promoted to alférez (equal to a modern army second lieutenant).

In 1823, he granted Rancho Los Corralitos 15,440-acre (62.5 km^{2}) in present-day Santa Cruz County, California to José Amesti. "Los Corralitos" means "the little corrals" in Spanish. The grant extended along Corralitos Creek north of Watsonville, and encompassed present-day Corralitos and Amesti.

In 1823, Rancho Llano de Buena Vista, means "Good View Plain". 8,446-acre (34.18 km^{2}) in the Salinas Valley was given by Argüello to José Mariano Estrada a lieutenant of the Mexican Artillery and in-law of Argüello.

In 1823, Argüello gave a land grant of Rancho San Pablo17,939-acre (72.60 km^{2}), in present-day Contra Costa County, California to Francisco María Castro (1775–1831), a former soldier at the San Francisco Presidio and one-time alcalde of the Pueblo of San José. The San Pablo grant covered what is now Richmond, San Pablo, and Kensington in western Contra Costa County.

In 1823, Argüello gave a land grant of Rancho Las Cienegas, at a size of 4,439-acre (17.96 km^{2}) in present-day Los Angeles County, California to Francisco Avila

Argüello was Governor at the time of the Chumash Revolt of 1824. Nearly a month after the initial revolt on February 21, 1824, a company of 100 Mexican soldiers, cavalrymen and priests, as well as a four-pound cannon, arrived at La Purisima Mission in the morning, intent on violently crushing the rebellion. Argüello, had had enough chaos in his country's new territory, and so had given the orders for the Chumash rebellion to be quelled with bloodshed, if necessary.

In 1824, Rancho Bolsa de San Cayetano was a 8,896-acre (36.00 km^{2}) land granted in present-day Monterey County, California near Monterey Bay by Argüello to Ygnacio Ferrer Vallejo

Rancho Bolsa de San Cayetano was an 8,896-acre (36.00 km2) Mexican land grant in present-day Monterey County, California given in 1824 by Governor Luís Antonio Argüello to Ygnacio Ferrer Vallejo, and confirmed to his eldest son, José de Jesús Vallejo, by Governor José Figueroa in 1834.[1] The name means "pocket of St. Cayetano". Pocket in this case usually refers to land surrounded by slough - in this case the Elkhorn Slough. The grant was bordered on the west by Monterey Bay.

Rancho Moro Cojo, that became part of Rancho Bolsa Nueva y Moro Cojo, in present-day Monterey County, California was granted by Governor Luís Antonio Argüello in 1825.

Antonio Maria Osio married Dolores Argüello, sister of Luis Antonio Argüello. In 1838, Osio settled in Monterey. In 1839, Governor Alvarado granted Osio, Angel Island (California), on the condition that Osio would set aside part of the island for a fort. However, Osio never took up residence there.

Francisco de Paula Marín, a Spaniard who became influential in the early Kingdom of Hawaii, was a confidant of Hawaiian King Kamehameha I. Marín acted as a jack-of-all-trades, sometimes even acting as a physician, probably without any formal education, and is credited with introducing many agricultural products. Marín wrote to governor Luis Antonio Argüello about moving to Alta California, but was told his multiple wives would not be welcome in California.

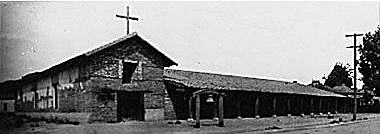
The 1840 rebuilt Mission San Francisco Solano circa 1910, last of the 21 missions

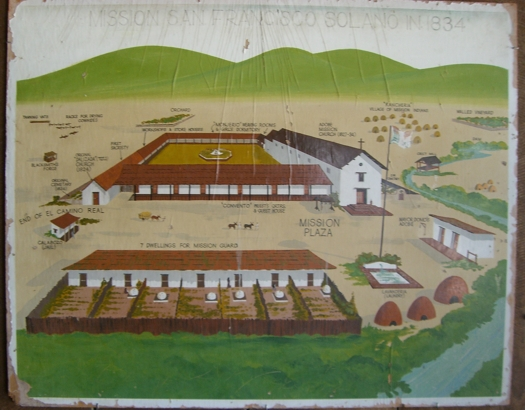
Stylized portrayal of the original Mission San Francisco Solano

In Argüello's tenure one new mission was founded: Mission San Francisco Solano (California) on July 4, 1823, by Father Jose Altimira. This was the last of the 21 missions founded as the Mexican secularization act of 1833 put an end to the missions. Mission San Francisco Solano was also the northernmost mission and the only one started after Mexico gained independence from Spain. Argüello wanted a robust Mexican presence north of the San Francisco Bay to keep the Russians who had established Fort Ross on the Pacific coast from moving further inland and down the coast. General Mariano Guadalupe Vallejo later closed the mission in 1834–1835, he took the roof titles for his own home, others joined in taking parts of the buildings and it turned to ruins, later being completely torn down. In need of a church for the town he made, in 1840 Vallejo had a small chapel built were the original parish church was.

== Legacy ==
In World War II, the United States liberty ship SS Luis Argüello was named in his honor.

== See also ==
- List of pre-statehood governors of California
- List of Ranchos of California
- For the various branches of the last name in both the Western Hemisphere and in Spain see also Argüello

== Sources ==
- Who Was Who in America, Historical Volume 1607-1896. Chicago: Marquis Who's Who, 1963.
- Wilson, J. G.; Fiske, J., eds. (1900). "Argüello, Luis Antonio" . Appletons' Cyclopædia of American Biography. New York: D. Appleton.
- Johnson, Rossiter, ed. (1906). "Argüello, Luis Antonio". The Biographical Dictionary of America. Vol. 1. Boston: American Biographical Society. p. 135.
- Edward Spillane (1913). "Luis Antonio Argüello" . In Herbermann, Charles (ed.). Catholic Encyclopedia. New York: Robert Appleton Company.
