= Lakisamni =

Band of Yokuts indigenous people of California

The Lakisamni, or alternately Laquisimne, (Spanish: Laquisimes) are one of the divisions of the Yokuts people, indigenous to the Stanislaus River area in California.

The Lakisamni probably inhabited the land in the San Joaquin Valley, from present-day Ripon in the west to Knights Ferry in the east. Mortar stones on the rocks in the banks of the Stanislaus River in Knights Ferry are evidence that the tribe once lived in the area.

== History ==
During the Spanish expeditions in the area by Gabriel Moraga, the Lakisamni were hostile and the Spanish treated them likewise.

The Lakisamni lived adjacent to the Miwok tribe of Tawalimnu. The Spanish named the present-day Stanislaus River after them: converting "Lakisamni" into the Spanish loanword "Laquisimes" (or singularly "Laquisime").

=== Notable Lakisamni ===
Two notable Lakisamni are:

- Estanislao (born Cucunuchi) — leader who rebelled against Spanish rule in Alta California.
- José Jesús (also known as Hozá Ha-sóos) — leader who succeeded Estanislao.

== See also ==
- Indigenous peoples of California
- Native American history of California
