= Rancho Ex-Mission la Purísima =

Land grant in California

Coordinates: 34.700°N 120.450°W

Rancho Ex-Mission la Purísima (also called Rancho Purísima) was a 14,736-acre (59.63 km^{2}) Mexican land grant in present-day Santa Barbara County, California given in 1845 by Governor Pío Pico to Jonathan Temple. The rancho derives its name from the secularized Mission La Purísima, but was called ex-Mission because of a division made of the lands held in the name of the Mission— the church retaining the grounds immediately around, and all of the lands outside of this are called ex-Mission lands. The grant was north of the Santa Ynez River and present-day Lompoc and encompasses present-day Vandenberg Village. The grant was defined by the boundaries of the earlier surrounding grants, viz: Rancho Mission Vieja de la Purisma, Rancho Jesús María, Rancho Lompoc, Rancho Los Álamos, and Rancho Santa Rita.

== History ==
Following the secularization of Mission La Purísima in 1834, the padres moved to Mission Santa Inés. The abandoned mission was sold in 1845 by Pío Pico to Jonathan Temple for $1,100. In 1850, Temple sold the property to José Ramón Malo (1812-1859) for $1,500. Malo was the grantee of the adjoining Rancho Santa Rita.

With the cession of California to the United States following the Mexican-American War, the 1848 Treaty of Guadalupe Hidalgo provided that the land grants would be honored. As required by the Land Act of 1851, a claim for Rancho Ex-Mission la Purísima was filed with the Public Land Commission in 1852, and the grant was patented to José Ramón Malo in 1882.

In 1870 Jesse Hill and D.W and A.P Jones, purchased an interest in Rancho Santa Rita and Rancho Ex-Mission la Purísima. Christy & Wise, wool merchants of San Francisco, also owned an interest.

== Historic sites of the Rancho ==
- La Purísima Mission State Historic Park
- Rancho Mission Vieja de la Purisma

== See also ==
- List of Ranchos of California
- Ranchos of Santa Barbara County, California
