= Pacomio =

Chumash revolutionary (1794–1840)

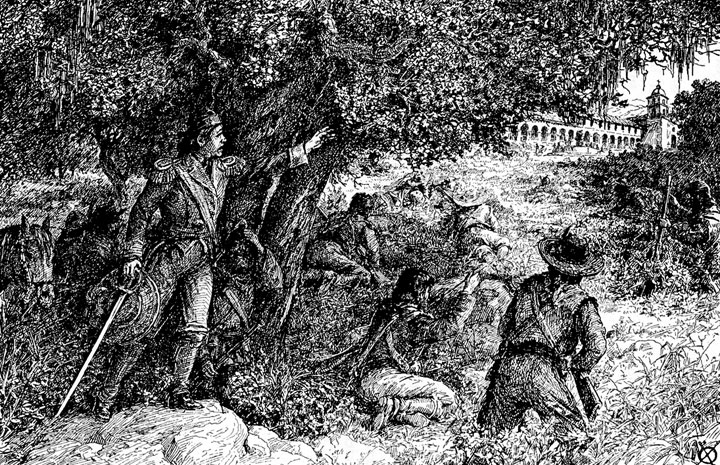
- Mexican troops advancing on La Purisima Mission, under fire from Pacomio's Chumash warriors. Painting by Alexander Harmer, early 20th century.
- Born: Pacomio Poqui c. 1794; La Ranchería de Esniscue, Alta California
- Died: 1840 (aged 46); Monterey, Alta California
- Occupations: Revolutionary, Carpenter, Civil Servant, Comisario de Policia of Monterey (1836-1840)
- Known for: Chumash Revolt of 1824
- Spouse(s): Gordiana, Eusebia María
- Children: 1

José Pacomio Poqui, also known as Pacomio (c. 1794 - 1840), was a Chumash revolutionary, carpenter and comissario de policia (Police commissioner) of Monterey, who led the largest and one of the most significant Native American uprisings against Spanish and Mexican rule of California during the Chumash Revolt of 1824. Pacomio's revolt against the Mexican-Spanish establishment has been called the most brutal in California's history and showed the Mexican government that California's indigenous population was not as servile as thought.

== Early life ==
Pacomio Poqui was born around 1794 to Chumash parents on La Rancheria de Esniscue in Alta California. He was baptized and given the Spanish name José at Mission La Purisima in 1803. As a young boy at Mission La Purisima, he proved to be extraordinarily intelligent, earning the favor of the mission's Franciscan friars. The friars taught him how to read and speak Spanish, which was rarely practiced by the Chumash. Most priests did not teach new indigenous converts Spanish, focusing instead on teaching them the basic symbols and ideology of Catholicism. Pacomio's fluent Spanish would become invaluable later in life.

In August 1807, at the age of 13, Pacomio married the 11-year-old Gordiana. The couple would live childless in Mission La Purisima for 12 years until Gordiana's unexpected death in 1819. During this time, Pacomio trained as a carpenter, working under Salvador Carabantes and, after 1811, master stonemason José Antonio Ramírez. In December 1812, Mission La Purisima was destroyed by an earthquake, and the craftsmen of the former mission were instructed to build a new version three miles to the north. Pacomio and other neophyte craftsmen, such as Mariano Francisco, Sebastián Tomás and Juan Nepomunceno, worked hard on the rebuilding. Upon Gordiana's death, Pacomio and Tomás traveled to Monterey to work on the Presidio. After his duties in the Presidio ended, Pacomio took a liking to the city and settled there. In February 1820, he married the widow Eusebia María, and in December, the couple had a daughter, María de Jesús. In 1824, growing tensions between the Chumash people and the new Mexican government forced him to leave his family in Monterey.

== Chumash Revolt of 1824 ==
When Mexico gained control over Spanish California in 1821, following its own independence from Spain, things seemed hopeless for the former Spanish colonists and soldiers. Not only had a former Spanish colony won independence and taken over their land, but under the orders of the unpopular King Ferdinand VII, the Spanish government had stopped their funding of all of the Spanish missions and presidios in California. This news was too much for the Spanish settlers to bear, and former Spanish soldiers began to take their anger out on the Native Americans inhabiting California. On February 21, 1824, a young Chumash boy from Mission La Purisima was severely beaten by a Mexican soldier when he was visiting a relative imprisoned inside the Mission Santa Inés guardhouse. This brutal act caused the Chumash neophytes on the mission to take up arms against the soldiers, attacking them with arrows and setting multiple buildings on fire. Two of the Chumash assailants were killed. After a heated battle with many wounded and the arrival Chumash reinforcements, the mission's priest and soldiers barricaded themselves inside a building, where they waited to be rescued until the next day, by a detachment of Mexican troops from the Presidio of Santa Barbara. The soldiers forced the Santa Inés rebels into the neophyte housing of the mission, which they promptly burnt down to flush the Chumash out. Some of the Chumash ran off to the two nearest missions, Santa Barbara and La Purisima, to inform their fellow Chumash of the revolt, and to join them. One messenger met with the Wot (leader) of the Chumash tribe, and informed him of the successful revolt against Mission Santa Inés. The Chumash leader ordered a call to arms among his people and more attacks on the surrounding missions, as well as the evacuation of all women and children to the mountains. The Chumash warriors armed themselves with bows and arrows and machetes, preparing for the inevitable conflict against the Mexican soldiers.

As the Chumash revolted against the Mexican soldiers inside Mission Santa Inés, a group of 2,000 Chumash warriors made a frontal assault on Mission La Purisima, capturing it and taking the soldiers, priests and civilians inside as prisoners. During the assault of the mission, one Chumash warrior was killed, and in retaliation, the rebels massacred four innocent travelers who had been captured during the battle. On February 24, The surviving soldiers and civilians inside La Purisima were allowed to travel back to the safety of Mission Santa Inés unharmed. Only one Franciscan, Father Antonio Rodríguez, stayed behind with the Chumash insurgents.

On February 22, the next day after the initial revolt, the Chumash occupiers were reinforced by the warriors fleeing from the skirmish at Santa Inés, as well as Chumash from Mission San Fernando Rey de España. The insurgents began to fortify La Purisima, erecting wooden palisades and cutting gun loops out of the mission's walls, arming themselves with the mission's muskets. Simultaneously, Mission Santa Barbara was also captured by another force of Chumash, who forced the mission's soldiers, clergy and civilians to retreat to the nearby Santa Barbara Presidio. Soon after the capture of Mission Santa Barbara, however, a small force of Mexican troops and priests arrived at the mission from the presidio, attempting to negotiate the surrender of Santa Barbara rebels. Predictably, the Chumash refused, and a heated battle raged inside the mission for multiple hours, ending with two Chumash killed and three wounded, and four Mexican soldiers wounded. The Mexican detachment fled back to the presidio, while the Chumash defenders ransacked the mission of its valuables and supplies, and retreated into the back country.

Upon hearing the news of the revolt at Santa Inés and the uprisings at the surrounding missions, Pacomio was overjoyed. His people had finally resisted the cruel subjugation they had faced for many years. Pacomio left his family after the Santa Inés revolt, to join the Chumash at Mission La Purisima. He assumed command over the force of 400 Chumash there and began to train them in the art of European warfare. Pacomio issued his warriors gunpowder and muskets, drilling his men endlessly with the intention that they would become proficient with the foreign weaponry. He also trained them to use the mission's two swivel guns to bring heavier firepower against the well-trained Mexican Army.

Nearly a month after the initial revolt on February 21, 1824, a company of 100 Mexican soldiers, cavalrymen, priests, and a four-pound cannon arrived at Mission La Purisima in the morning, intent on violently crushing the rebellion. The Mexican Governor of Alta California, Luis Antonio Argüello, had had enough chaos in his country's new territory and had given the order for the Chumash rebellion to be quelled with bloodshed, if necessary. A bloody battle broke out at Mission La Purisima, with Pacomio bravely leading the insurgents against the Mexicans. The Chumash let loose precise musket volleys, which scattered the Mexican ranks, and torrents of lethal arrows rained down upon the Mexican soldiers and cavalry. The Mexicans charged the Chumash with their cavalrymen, armed with muskets, who provided support and cover fire for the infantry. The four-pound cannon opened fire on the insurgents, killing many and causing disorder among the Chumash ranks. Eventually, as the battle progressed, Pacomio ordered the mission's two swivel guns to fire upon the enemy. However, the Chumash operating the guns had very little experience with them, and the two swivel guns misfired, exploding in the gunners' faces and killing them instantly. Dismayed, Pacomio commanded his men to hold strong, despite the loss of the cannons. After a morning of intense fighting, Father Rodríguez negotiated a ceasefire. The casualties at the end of the battle were appalling: five Mexican soldiers were killed and a few wounded, the Chumash suffered sixteen losses and more wounded. After the Battle of La Purisima, Pacomio and his remaining warriors surrendered. The captured La Purisima rebels were rounded up, taken to Monterey, and tried in court. Seven Chumash were convicted of the murder of the four travelers at Mission La Purisima and publicly executed by hanging. The four leaders of the revolt, Pacomio, Mariano, Benito, and Bernarde, were sentenced to ten years of chain gang labor (Benito and Bernard managed to escape the Monterey prison and fled into the mountains to join their kin). After two months of unrest, the bloodiest Native American uprising in Californian history was over.

== Later life and death ==
After serving his ten-year sentence, Pacomio was reunited with his family in Monterey in 1834. He continued with his skill in carpentry, making furniture for the Monterey Presidio and Mission La Purisima. Pacomio's business began to flourish as Monterey's population was booming, increasing from 1,600 in 1830 to nearly 2,000 in 1845. In 1833, Pacomio's daughter, María de Jesús, was thirteen years old when she married Gregorio, a Chumash neophyte who participated in the revolt. However, in 1836, soon after moving into her father's house with her husband, María died during childbirth at sixteen.

Pacomio became an influential man in the Monterey community and local government. His contemporaries described him as "a well-educated neophyte, skillful carpenter and cabinet-maker" as well as "an intelligent citizen and member of the Ayuntamiento (city council) of Monterey." Ironically, the man who had led the Chumash in revolt in 1824 was offered the position of Monterey's comissario de policia, or Police commissioner, in 1836, which Pacomio gladly accepted.

Throughout the rest of his life in Monterey, Pacomio never lost touch with his native heritage and identity. Citizens walking past his house regularly observed him outside, singing "Chumash songs while dancing, dressed only in a breech-clout, his body painted red, white and black, and with feathers on his head."

Pacomio and his wife both died of smallpox during an Epidemic in Monterey in 1844.
