= Estanislao =

Leader of the Lakisamni tribe

- Born: Cucunuchi c. 1798; Río de los Laquisimes, Alta California
- Died: July 31, 1838 (aged 40); Mission San José, Alta California

Cucunuchi (c. 1798 – 1838), baptized as Estanislao, was an Indigenous alcalde of Mission San José and a member and leader of the Lakisamni tribe of the Yokuts people of northern California. He is famous for leading bands of armed Native Americans in revolt against the Mexican government and mission establishments.

== Early life ==
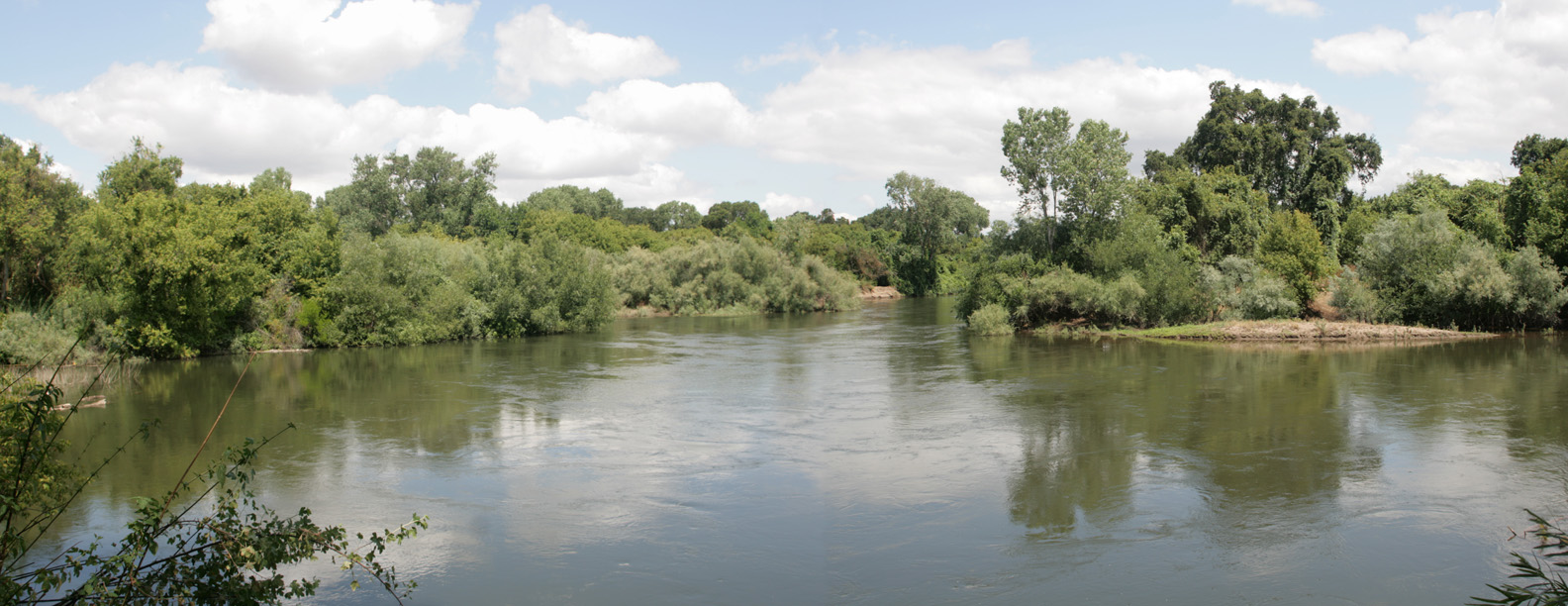
Present-day Stanislaus River was the home of many Native-American tribes. During the Mexican era, it was known as "Río de los Laquisimes"

Estanislao was born about 1798 on the banks of the Río de Laquisimes (present-day Stanislaus River, Modesto, California). According to records at Mission San José, mission padres visited the Laquisimes area in 1821 and insisted that Cucunuchi return to the mission along with his wife, daughter, and mother to receive a formal Christian education. His younger brother Canocee had already visited the mission in 1820 and been baptized with the name "Orencio". Cucunuchi and his family journeyed to the mission on September 24, 1821, but his father did not go. He was soon baptized with the name "Estanislao" (Spanish for Stanislaus) after his arrival at the mission.

== Life at the mission ==
Estanislao was the alcalde of the community before he left the mission with about 400 followers in 1827. Juan Bojorques describes Estanislao in his Recuerdos sobre la historia de California (1887) as "about six feet tall, his skin was more white than bronze, he was very muscular like a horse". Juan Bautista Alvarado also mentions Estanislao's literacy in History of California (1876), he writes: "Estanislao was able to read and write and stood out among the leaders of other Central California Indian tribes".

The group began raiding the Missions San José, Santa Clara, and Santa Cruz, as well as Mexican settlers in the area around the Laquisimas River (now the Stanislaus River; during the later Mexican era, this river was called Rio Estanislao). Estanislao was joined by Chumash Indians led by Pacomio and by other Yokuts until at one time his army had 4,000 men. Estanislao educated his men in battle techniques he had learned from Spanish and Mexican soldiers. These techniques, including trenches, palisades, and an early form of guerilla warfare were essential to initial success on the battlefield. His raids were characterized as sudden, usually involving a trap, and ending with no loss of life, and he would sometimes use his sword to carve his initial, "S", authenticating his handiwork (Estanislao is therefore thought to have been one of the inspirations for the fictional character Zorro).

The Franciscan friars and Mexican settlers pleaded for help from the Mexican army. Finally, Governor Echeandía called the army into action. Three expeditions from the Presidio of San Francisco and the Presidio of Monterey failed to subdue the band. A fourth, larger force led by General Mariano Guadalupe Vallejo finally ousted Estanislao and his people from the Laquisimas River in the Spring of 1829. Commander Ignacio Martínez wrote to Vallejo with orders concerning the rebels, "They are extremely insolent ..., seducing the other [Indians] to accompany them in their evil and diabolical schemes, openly insulting our troops and ridiculing them and their weapons... The objective will be to administer a total defeat to the Indians..., leaving them completely crushed." Both Vallejo and Estanislao were accused of brutality and atrocities by their forces in the battle. During the aftermath of the battle, six Indians were captured, including a man named Matias. Four of them were brutally executed, one of whom died from 73 arrows and a gunshot to the head. The governor ordered an investigation into the extrajudicial killings which found soldier Joaquin Alverado guilty. He was sentenced to five years of additional military service.

Estanislao returned briefly to the Mission San José on May 31, 1829 to ask Father Narciso Duran for forgiveness for his men and himself. Father Duran successfully petitioned Governor José María de Echeandía to pardon Estanislao. The pardon was granted for Estanislao and his men on October 7, 1829.

There are multiple theories concerning the later years of his life. Estanislao returned to the Laquisimas River to lead his people. Yoscolo, a Yokuts Indian from the Mission Santa Clara, joined Estanislao's group in 1831. Yoscolo brought several hundred Indians with him from the Mission Santa Clara. Yoscolo and Estanislao led many raids against Mexican settlers. Yoscolo was different from Estanislao and did not mind killing Mexican settlers if he had to. Yoscolo sometimes wore a mask during his raids (another link to the fictional character Zorro).

During the spring of 1833, malaria was introduced into the San Joaquin Valley by Canadian beaver trappers from the Hudson's Bay Company. More than 20,000 Native Californians died from malaria that spring, including Yokuts, Chumash, Miwok, and others.

== Later life ==
On August 24, 1834, Estanislao returned to the Mission San Jose and prospered there while teaching others the Yokuts language and culture. He remained at the mission until his death, possibly from smallpox, on July 31, 1838. The Stanislaus River, Stanislaus County, and the failed Mormon settlement Stanislaus City (now Ripon) were named in his honor.
