= Morton D. Hull =

American politician

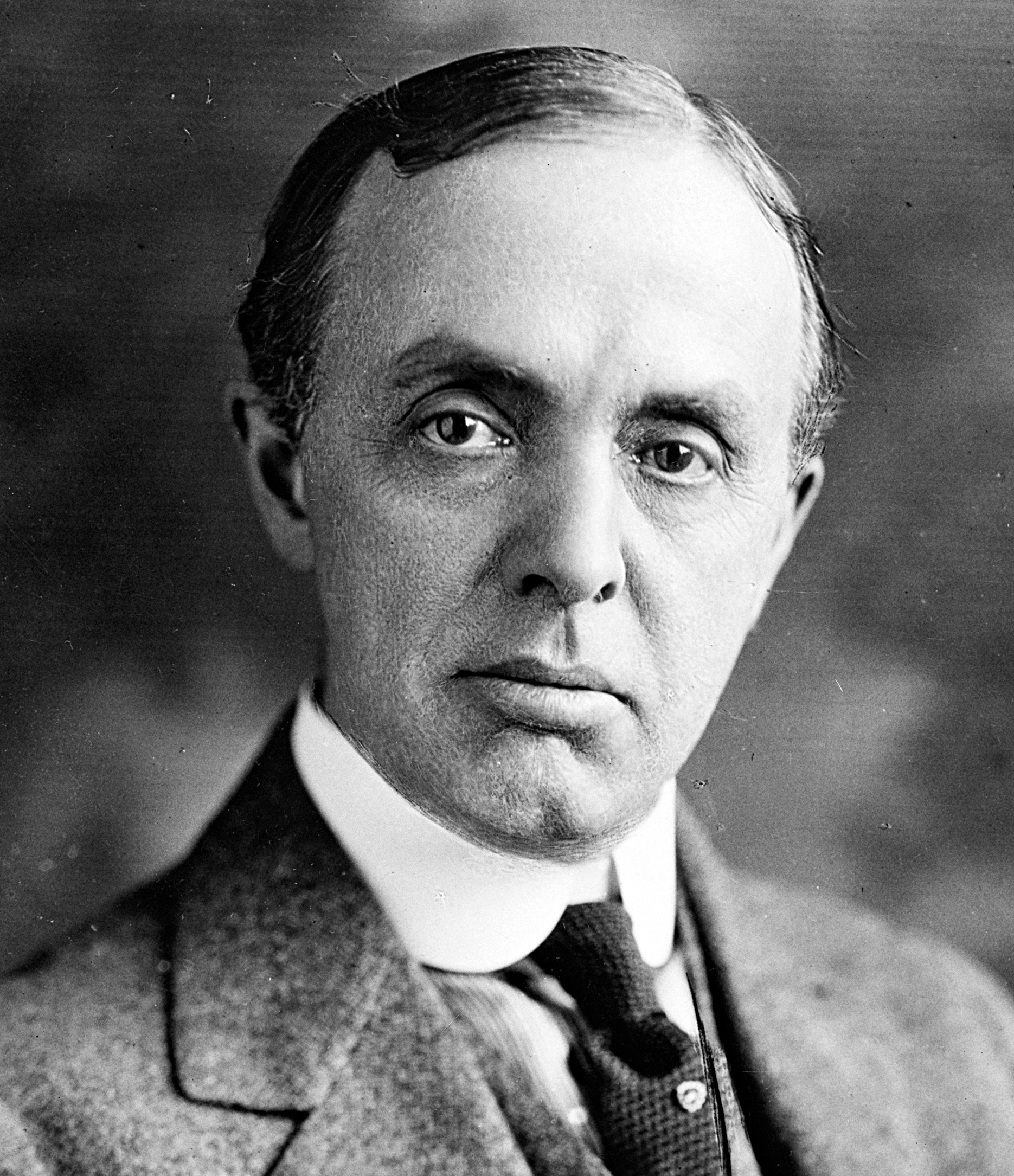

Member of the U.S. House of Representatives from Illinois's 2nd district
- In office April 3, 1923 – March 3, 1933
- Preceded by: James Robert Mann
- Succeeded by: P. H. Moynihan

Member of the Illinois House of Representatives
- In office 1906-1914

Member of the Illinois Senate
- In office 1915-1922

Personal details
- Born: January 13, 1867 Chicago, Illinois
- Died: August 20, 1937 (aged 70) Bennington, Vermont
- Party: Republican

Morton Denison Hull (January 13, 1867 – August 20, 1937) was a U.S. representative from Illinois.

Born in Chicago, Illinois, Hull was the son of Morton B. Hull and Eudora Denison Hull. His father was a bank executive. He attended the public schools and Phillips Exeter Academy, Exeter, New Hampshire, in 1885. He graduated from Harvard University in 1892. He was admitted to the bar in 1892 and commenced the practice of law in Chicago. He was also financially interested in various manufacturing concerns. He served as a member of the Illinois House of Representatives from 1906 to 1914. He served as a member of the Illinois Senate from 1915 to 1922. He was an unsuccessful candidate for nomination for Governor in 1916. He served as a delegate to the Republican National Convention in 1916. He served as a trustee of the Meadville Theological Seminary and served on the Board of Trustees at Bennington College in Vermont. He served as a delegate to the state constitutional convention in 1920.

Hull was elected as a Republican to the Sixty-eighth Congress to fill the vacancy caused by the death of James R. Mann. He was re-elected to the Sixty-ninth and to the three succeeding Congresses and served from April 3, 1923, to March 3, 1933. He was not a candidate for renomination in 1932. He resumed his former pursuits. Greatly active in the First Unitarian Church of Chicago, he gave money for the construction of a new sanctuary in 1931, designed by his son.

His twin sister Eudora Hull Spalding was a philanthropist who opened a tuberculosis hospital in Naperville and owned Rancho Sespe in California. He married Katherine Bingham, who died in 1931, and had a son Denison B. Hull, who became an architect in Chicago. Hull died at his summer home in Bennington, Vermont at age 70. His remains were cremated and the ashes placed in a crypt in the First Unitarian Church in Chicago.

U.S. House of Representatives
Preceded by James R. Mann	Member of the U.S. House of Representatives from Illinois's 2nd congressional district April 3, 1923 – March 3, 1933	Succeeded by P. H. Moynihan
