= Rancho Mission Vieja de la Purísima =

Land grant in California

Coordinates: 34.700°N 120.450°W

Rancho Mission Vieja de la Purísima was a 4,414-acre (17.86 km^{2}) Mexican land grant in present-day northern Santa Barbara County, California given in 1845 by Governor Pío Pico to Joaquín Carrillo and José Antonio Carrillo. The grant included the original site of Mission La Purísima Concepción, located north of present-day Lompoc.

== History ==
Joaquín Carrillo and José Antonio Carrillo were the sons of Domingo Antonio Ygnacio Carrillo (1791–1837) and Maria Concepcion Nicanor Pico (1797–1871). José Joaquin Carrillo (1801-1868) married Manuela Carrillo and served as Santa Barbara County judge from 1851 to 1853. The Carrillo brothers were also granted Rancho Lompoc.

With the cession of California to the United States following the Mexican-American War, the 1848 Treaty of Guadalupe Hidalgo provided that the land grants would be honored. As required by the Land Act of 1851, a claim for Rancho Mission Vieja de la Purisma was filed with the Public Land Commission in 1852, and the grant was patented to Joaquín Carrillo and José Antonio Carrillo in 1873.

By 1855, the California cattle industry began to decline. In 1860, the Carillos sold Rancho Mission Vieja de la Purisma to the More brothers, who were the largest landowner in Santa Barbara County (which at the time included all of present-day Ventura County). In addition to Rancho Mission Vieja de la Purisma, the More brothers owned the adjacent Rancho Lompoc and Rancho Santa Paula y Saticoy, Santa Rosa Island and Rancho Sespe. The droughts of the early 1860s forced the More brothers to dissolve their partnership and divide up their lands. Sheep barons from the midwest, Col. W.W. Hollister, W.H. Hollister and Joseph W. Cooper, along with Thomas Dibblee, purchased Rancho Lompoc and Rancho Mission Vieja de la Purisma in 1863.

== Historic sites of the Rancho vicinity ==
- La Purísima Mission State Historic Park
- Rancho Ex-Mission la Purísima

== See also ==
- List of Ranchos of California
- Ranchos of Santa Barbara County, California
