= Vallejo Flour Mill =

Historic site in Niles, Fremont, California

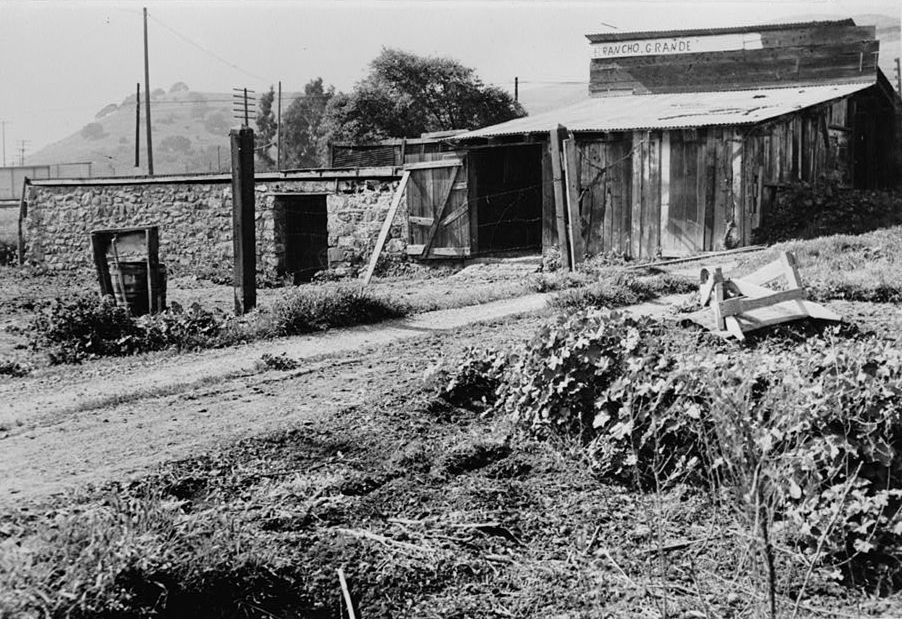
- 1856 Vallejo Flour Mill foundation (looking northwest, August 1940)

- Location within California
- 37.57804°N 121.96933°W
- Location: Vallejo Flour Mill Historic Park, Niles Canyon Rd and Mission Blvd, Fremont, California

History
- Built: 1856

Site notes
- Architect: José de Jesús Vallejo

California Historical Landmark
- Reference no.: 46

The first Vallejo Flour Mill, in the Niles district of Fremont, California, was built in 1841 by José de Jesús Vallejo (1798–1882), elder brother of General Mariano Guadalupe Vallejo, on his Rancho Arroyo de la Alameda, along with a dam and aqueduct to power it. The Flour Mill was located at the mouth of Niles Canyon, then called Alameda Cañon, which served as the major course of Alameda Creek. A second Flour Mill was built in 1856, the stone foundation of which may still be seen today.

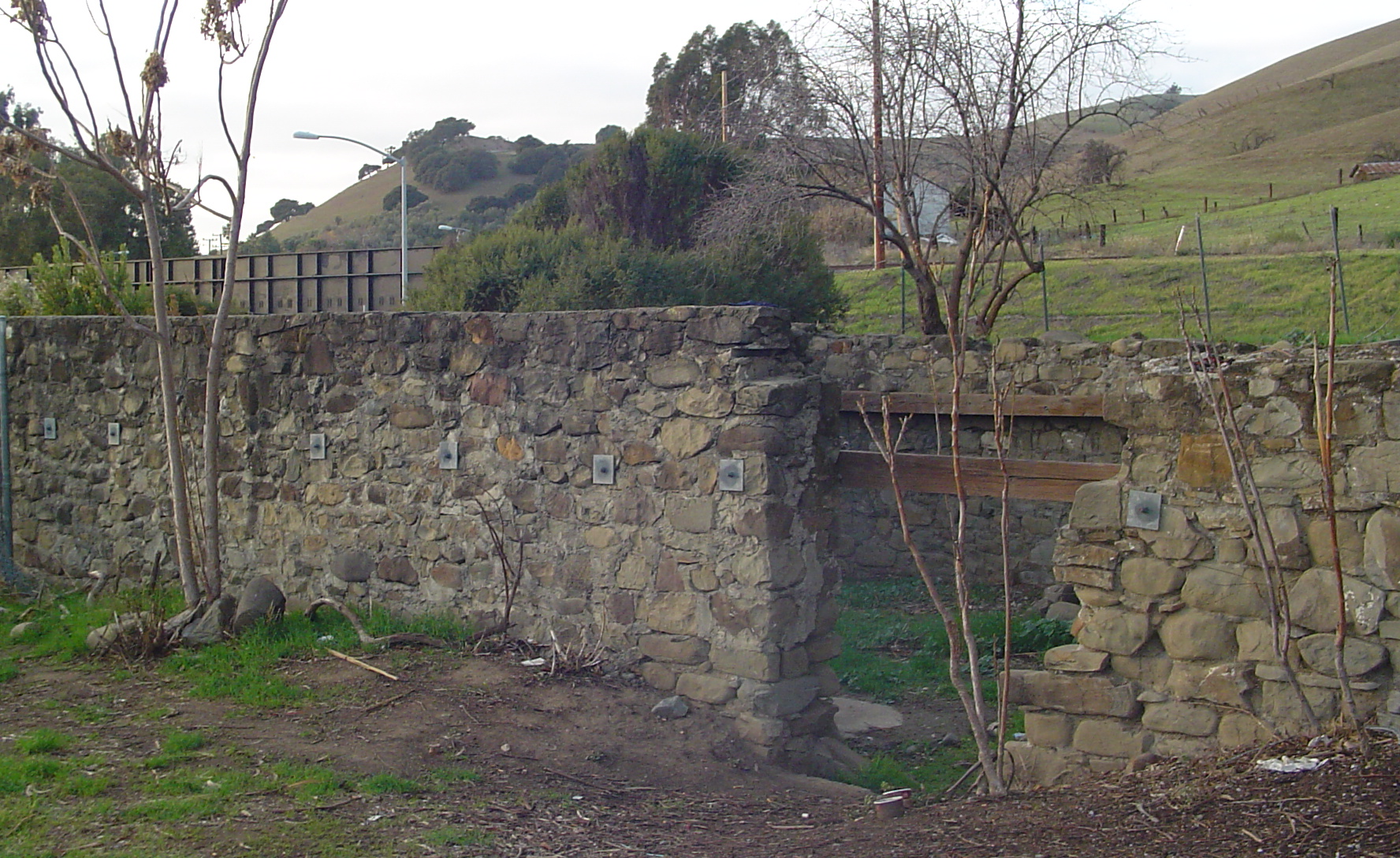
Vallejo Flour Mill ruins, CHL #46 (2008)

The ruins of the Vallejo Flour Mill is located at the northeast corner of Niles Canyon Road (State Route 84) and Mission Boulevard (State Route 238) in Vallejo Mill Historical Park. In 1932, it was designated a California Historical Landmark (#46).

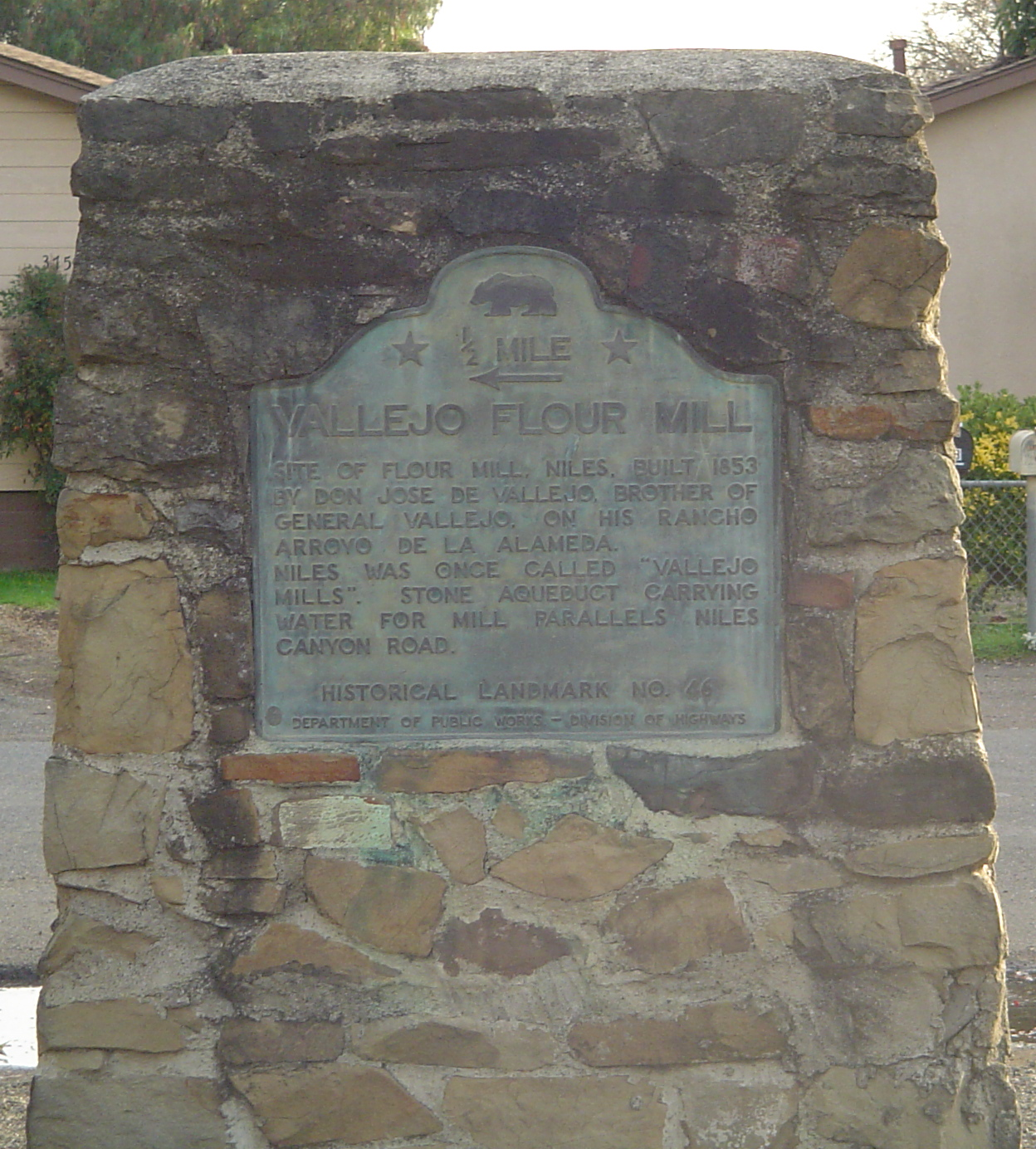
Vallejo Flour Mill historical marker CHL #46 (2008), on Mission Blvd, Fremont, CA

A watercolor painting of the 1856 Flour Mill, done by Carmelita Vallejo, J & J Vallejo's daughter then finishing her studies at the San Jose Notre Dame Academy, showed several buildings surrounding a three-story Flour Mill building with a large wooden wheel on the north side. According to the Alameda County Gazette (January 1857), the wheel was the overshot design, 30 feet in diameter and 8 feet broad, and the millstone was 4 feet in diameter. The Flour Mill cost $5,000 and had a capacity of 150 barrels of flour a day.

In 1909, the 1841 adobe mill was torn down to make way for a wye-switch built by Southern Pacific Railroad.

== Impact of the first transcontinental railroad ==
In 1865–1866, Western Pacific, one of three companies to build the first transcontinental railroad, built 20 miles (32 km) of track north of San Jose towards Sacramento. This 20 miles (32 km) railroad segment skirted the Vallejo Flour Mills at the mouth of Alameda Cañon (now Niles Canyon) and reached halfway into the canyon, about a mile past the Farwell Bridge near milepost 33 where it stopped. The Western Pacific used 500 Chinese laborers to grade and construct the rail line into the rugged canyon with its tight curves and narrow banks. Four major timber through (Howe) truss bridges were built to cross Alameda Creek and Arroyo de la Laguna Creek. In addition to building wooden bridges and grading the railroad bed, the laborers built culverts, retaining walls, and bridge piers in masonry. In October 1866, construction was halted because of disagreements between the railroad's contractors and its financiers.

In June 1869, the Central Pacific Railroad, a subsidiary of which had acquired the Western Pacific and Oakland Point in 1868, restarted work on the railroad line through Alameda Cañon, also using Chinese laborers, and added a new line from the canyon northwest towards Oakland. The new line started in the canyon a mile east of the Mills at a junction initially called the Vallejo Mills Junction and followed the line of Vallejo's aqueduct, which was torn out to build the railroad and then rebuilt. Since the junction in the canyon was confining, Central Pacific started to grade a new junction in the valley just west of the Mills to service both the 1869 transcontinental mainline as well as the 1866 Western Pacific San Jose line. That same year, J & J Vallejo's son, Plutarco Vallejo, with surveyor Luis Castro, laid out the first subdivision of 23 lots along Vallejo Street south of the Mills and east of the new junction. The subdivision plat, dated 3 November 1869, was recorded as Vallejo Mills, a.k.a. Vallejo Mill, Vallejo's Mill, or Vallejo's Mills. Also in November, the Transcript reported that the railroad purchased a quarter section of land west of the new junction for a new town.

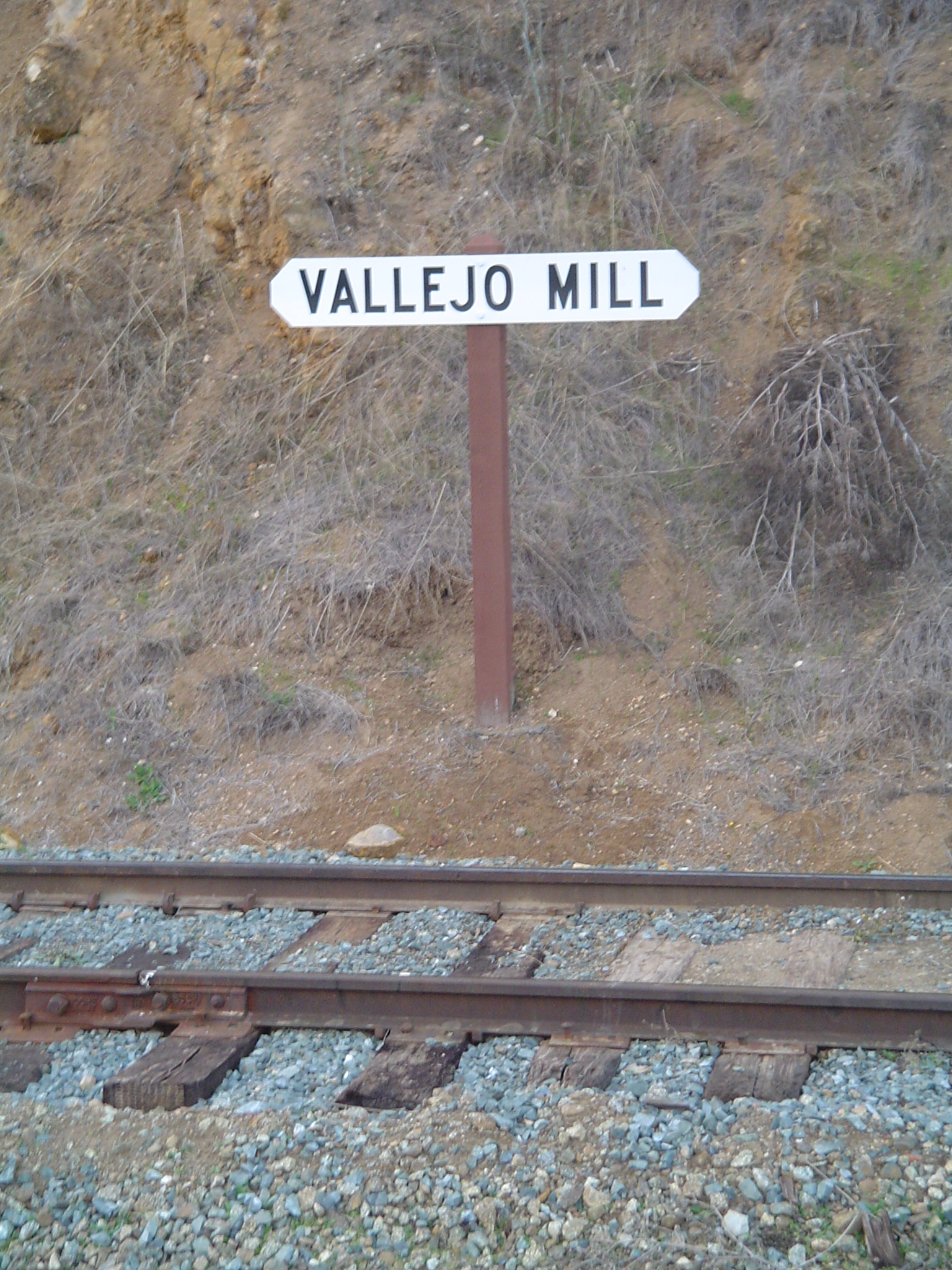
Vallejo Mill station sign on the railroad

After the completion of the First transcontinental railroad to the Pacific coast, Central Pacific renamed by December 1869 the Vallejo Mill station and junction in the canyon as Niles, after their railroad attorney and stockholder, Addison Niles, who became two years later associate justice on the California Supreme Court. On April 28, 1870, Central Pacific switch over to the new junction in the valley, which sprang to life as Niles. That same year, Central Pacific also built a railroad depot, complete with a restaurant and saloon, at the Niles junction for the convenience of the transferring train passengers. Thereafter, the Vallejo Mills settlement became known as Niles and the byline Niles, Cal started to appear in newspapers by the mid-1870s.

 The people of Vallejo Mills in 1857 received their mail by way of Centreville until after the railroad was built.  Then the name of the place changed to Niles and an express office was established...  After... two years it was moved to the depot. It was not until 1873 that Niles had a Post-office, it opening in November of that year.—handwritten account by Mrs. Snyder from Niles, 1904[2]: 21 

Similarly, Alameda Cañon became known as Niles Canyon. The town plat for Niles west of the new junction, with its lettered and numbered grid streets, was registered in 1884 and did not begin to develop commercially until the early 1890s. In 1956, Niles became a district within the city of Fremont.

== See also ==
- Niles, a district in the City of Fremont, California
- Niles Canyon
- Niles Canyon Railway
