= Rancho Arroyo de la Alameda =

Mexican land grant in California

Coordinates: 37.630°N 122.040°W

Rancho Arroyo de la Alameda was a 17,705-acre (71.65 km^{2}) Mexican land grant in present-day Alameda County, California.

It was given in 1842 by Governor Juan B. Alvarado to José de Jesús Vallejo. The grant extended along Alameda Creek and encompassed present day Union City, Niles and Mount Eden.

== History ==
José de Jesús Vallejo (1798–1882), the elder brother of General Mariano Guadalupe Vallejo, inherited Rancho Bolsa de San Cayetano from his father in 1831. José de Jesus Vallejo was appointed administrator of Mission San José in 1837, but resigned in 1840, after an investigation by William Hartnell, who was sent by Governor Alvarado. Alvarado granted the four square league Rancho Arroyo de la Alameda, former Mission San José land to Jose de Jesus Vallejo in 1842.

With the cession of California to the United States following the Mexican-American War, the 1848 Treaty of Guadalupe Hidalgo provided that the land grants would be honored. As required by the Land Act of 1851, a claim for Rancho Arroyo de la Alameda was filed with the Public Land Commission in 1852, and the grant was patented to José de Jesús Vallejo in 1858.

In 1863, the Southeast portion of Rancho Arroyo de la Alameda was acquired by Jonas Clark, who subdivided it and sold it in 1877.

== Historic sites of the Rancho ==
- Vallejo Flour Mill. Flour mill built in 1856 by José de Jesús Vallejo.

== See also ==
- Ranchos of Alameda County, California
