= Rancho Bolsa de San Cayetano =

Mexican land grant in California

Coordinates: 36.880°N 121.740°W

Rancho Bolsa de San Cayetano was a 8,896-acre (36.00 km^{2}) Mexican land grant in present-day Monterey County, California given in 1824 by Governor Luís Antonio Argüello to Ygnacio Ferrer Vallejo, and confirmed to his eldest son, José de Jesús Vallejo, by Governor José Figueroa in 1834. The name means "pocket of St. Cayetano". Pocket usually refers to land surrounded by slough - in this case the Elkhorn Slough. The grant was bordered on the west by Monterey Bay and on the north by the Pajaro River, and is just south of present-day Watsonville.

== History ==
Ygnacio Vicente Ferrer Vallejo (1740–1832), a sergeant in the Spanish Army of New Spain, came to Alta California in 1774 with Fernando Rivera y Moncada. He married Maria Antonia Lugo, daughter of Francisco Salvador Lugo in 1790. Among their thirteen children, the most distinguished was Mariano Guadalupe Vallejo. Ygnacio Vallejo received the two square league Rancho Bolsa de San Cayetano grant in 1824. After his death in 1832, the rancho was inherited by his eldest son, José de Jesús Vallejo (1798–1882). José de Jesús Vallejo was appointed civil administrator at the Mission San José in 1837, and was the grantee of Rancho Arroyo de la Alameda in 1842.

With the cession of California to the United States following the Mexican-American War, the 1848 Treaty of Guadalupe Hidalgo provided that the land grants would be honored. As required by the Land Act of 1851, a claim for Rancho Bolsa de San Cayetano was filed by José de Jesús Vallejo with the Public Land Commission in 1852 and confirmed by the US District Court in 1856. Vallejo unsuccessfully appealed the official survey to the US Supreme Court, and the grant was patented in 1865.

A claim for half of the grant to José Dolores Pico was filed by María Antonia Pico with the Land Commission in 1853, but was rejected on the grounds that he had failed to fulfill the conditions of the grant.

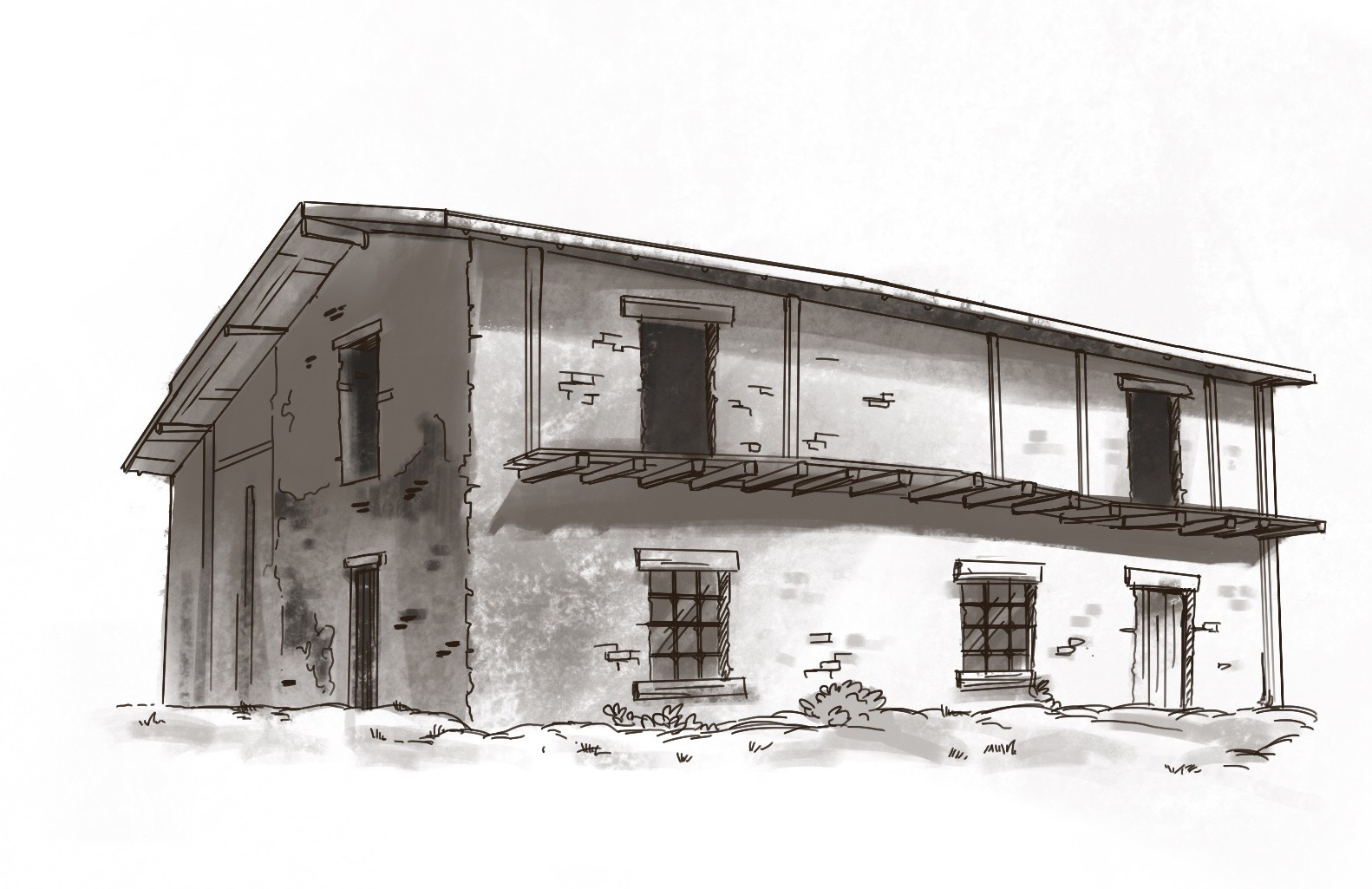
Artist view of Casa Materna of the Vallejos, after it was abandoned.

== Historic sites of the Rancho ==
- The Glass House, Casa Materna of the Vallejos. House built by Ygnacio Vallejo, and known as the “Glass House” for the many glass windows that enclosed its upper porch. Attempts to restore this first home of the Vallejo family were unsuccessful, and the remains were demolished in 1962. The Glass House is a registered California Historical Landmark, number 387. The site is on a bluff looking north across the Pajaro River valley toward Watsonville.

== See also ==
- Ranchos of California
- List of Ranchos of California
