= Rancho Santa Rita (Malo) =

Land grant in California

Coordinates: 34.660°N 120.380°W

Rancho Santa Rita was a 13,316-acre (53.89 km^{2}) Mexican land grant in present-day northern Santa Barbara County, California given in 1845 by Governor Pio Pico to José Ramón Malo. The grant was located in the Santa Rita Valley east of present-day Lompoc.

== History ==
José Ramón Malo (1812-1859) was granted the three square league Rancho Santa Rita in 1845. In 1850, Malo bought the adjacent Rancho Ex-Mission la Purisima from Jonathan Temple. Malo (along with Fernando Tico and Pablo de la Guerra) was a member of the first Santa Barbara County Court of Sessions in 1854.

With the cession of California to the United States following the Mexican-American War, the 1848 Treaty of Guadalupe Hidalgo provided that the land grants would be honored. As required by the Land Act of 1851, a claim for Rancho Santa Rita was filed with the Public Land Commission in 1852, and the grant was patented to José Ramón Malo in 1875.

In 1870 Jesse Hill and D.W and A.P Jones, purchased an interest in Rancho Ex-Mission la Purisima and Rancho Santa Rita. Christy & Wise, wool merchants of San Francisco, also owned an interest.

== See also ==
- Ranchos of California
- List of Ranchos of California
