= Eudora Hull Spalding =

American philanthropist

- Spalding, from a 1922 newspaper, holding fishing rod
- Born: Eudora Hull; January 13, 1867; Chicago, Illinois, U.S.
- Died: December 18, 1942 (aged 75); Pasadena, California, U.S.
- Other name: Eudora Hull Gaylord
- Occupation: Philanthropist
- Known for: Founder, Edward Hospital; owner, Rancho Sespe
- Relatives: Morton D. Hull (brother); Albert Spalding (father-in-law)

Eudora M. Hull Gaylord Spalding (January 13, 1867 – December 18, 1942) was an American socialite and philanthropist, founder of Edward Hospital in Naperville, Illinois. She owned Rancho Sespe in California, and gave a large endowment to the California Institute of Technology, which has an engineering building named in her honor.

== Biography ==
Spalding was born in Chicago, the daughter of Morton Benjamin Hull and Eudora Elvina Denison Hull. Her father was a bank executive. She had a twin brother, Morton D. Hull, who became a Congressman and an Illinois state senator.

Sleeping Shack, Edward's Sanatorium, Naperville, Illinois, from a 1908 publication

Hull married Edward L. Gaylord in 1897; he died from tuberculosis in 1904. She bought land and opened Edward's Sanatorium outside Naperville, Illinois, in 1907, with the site design based on the hospitals she saw in the East while her first husband was ill. The sanatorium provided open-air beds and other treatments for tuberculosis.

She married again in 1906, to Keith Spalding. They lived at a Pasadena villa designed by Paul Theine. She owned and expanded Rancho Sespe near Fillmore, California, which included citrus groves, walnut orchards, grazing land, and an aviary of exotic birds, and employed about 200 workers. She left the ranch's proceeds to the California Institute of Technology in her will. She donated money to the San Diego Zoo to build dove and pigeon cages. She also funded several equipment purchases at Pasadena Hospital. She was known as a sportswoman in Pasadena society, and for her love of yachting and fishing.

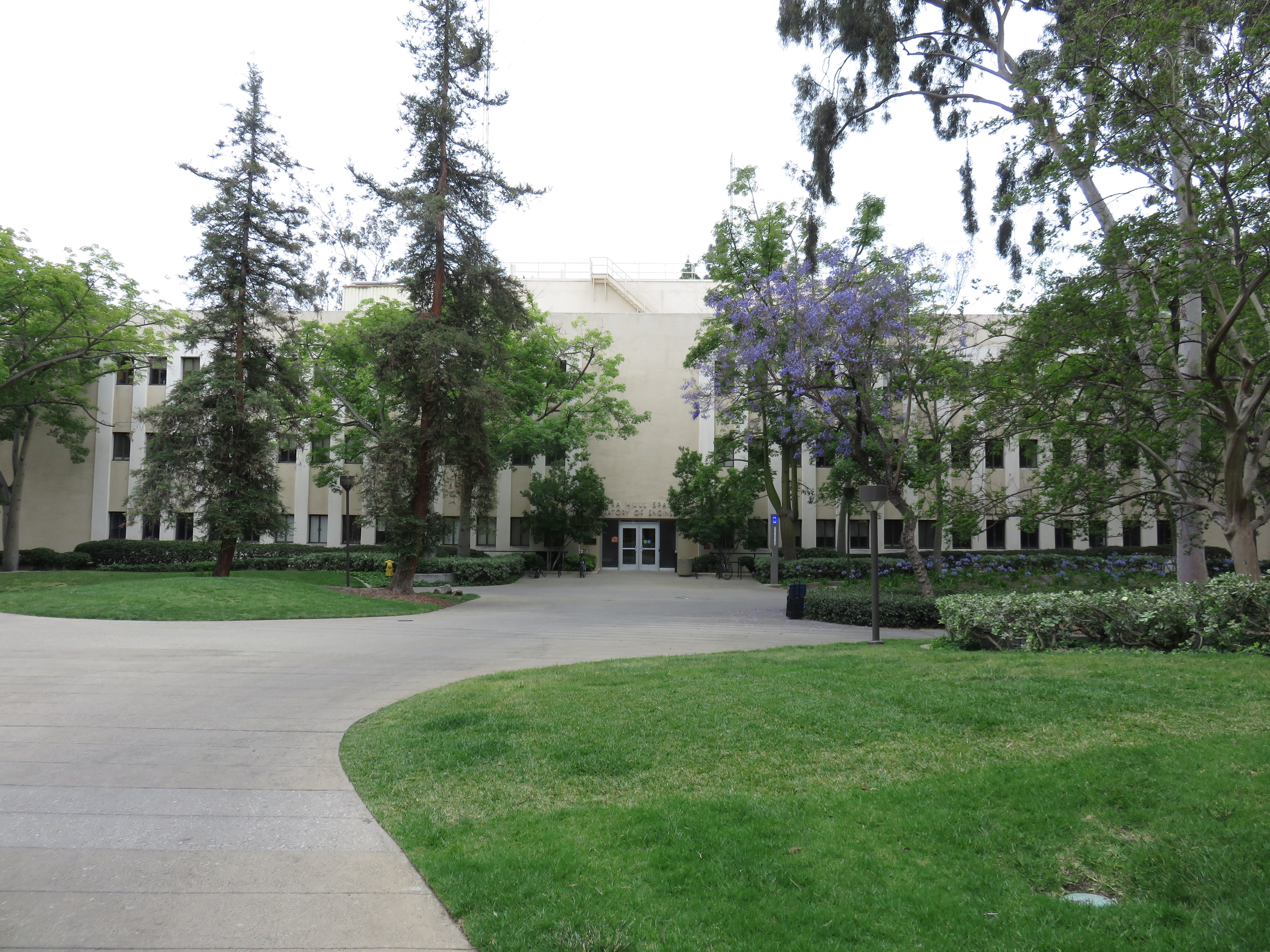
E. Spalding Laboratory at Caltech in 2018

Spalding died in 1942, at age 75, in Pasadena.

== Legacy ==
Edward's Sanatorium became Edward Hospital in 1955, and is still a medical facility today. The Eudora Hull Spalding Laboratory of Engineering at California Institute of Technology was named in her memory. Rancho Sespe Bunkhouse #2 is now a museum in Fillmore Historic Park.
