= Rancho Santa Paula y Saticoy =

Mexican land grant in present-day Ventura County, California

Coordinates: 34.320°N 119.100°W

Rancho Santa Paula y Saticoy was a 17,773-acre (71.92 km^{2}) Mexican land grant in the Santa Clara River Valley, in present-day Ventura County, California, and granted in 1843 by Governor Manuel Micheltorena to Manuel Jimeno Casarin. The rancho lands include the modern communities of Saticoy and Santa Paula along the Santa Clara River.

== History ==
Micheltorena granted four leagues to Casarin. Manual Jimeno Casarin served as Alta California Secretary of State under Governor Alvarado and Governor Micheltorena, was a senior member of the State Assembly, and occasionally acting governor. He was married to María de las Angustias, the daughter of José de la Guerra y Noriega. Casarin, who lived in Monterey, also owned Rancho Salsipuedes in Santa Cruz County and Rancho Jimeno in Yolo County. Unlike many land grants holders, Casarin was not required to show any use or development of the land and apparently he did not use the land, either for agriculture or ranching. He died in 1853 during a visit to Mexico.

Levi Parsons, Eugene Casserly, J. B. Crocket, David Mahoney and others, purchased the rancho from Casarin in 1852.

With the cession of California to the United States following the Mexican-American War, the 1848 Treaty of Guadalupe Hidalgo provided that the land grants would be honored. As required by the Land Act of 1851, a claim for Rancho Santa Paula y Saticoy was filed with the Public Land Commission in 1853, and the grant was patented to John P. Davidson in 1872.

In the 1850s, the ranch came under the ownership of T. Wallace More, and his brothers Andrew and Henry, owners also of the neighboring Rancho Sespe. By 1860, the More brothers were the largest landowner in Santa Barbara County (which at the time included all of present-day Ventura County). Besides Rancho Santa Paula y Saticoy and Rancho Sespe, the More brothers owned Santa Rosa Island, Rancho Lompoc and Rancho Mission Vieja de la Purisma. The drought of 1863 and 1864 forced the More brothers to dissolve their partnership and divide up their lands.

George G. Briggs, of Marysville, California, purchased the rancho from the More Brothers in 1862, planning to plant fruit orchards. Discouraged by droughts and the death of his wife, Briggs returned to northern California in 1864. In 1867 Briggs subdivided the rancho and sold it for smaller 150-acre (0.61 km^{2}) farms.

In 1872 Nathan Weston Blanchard, purchased 2,700 acres (10.9 km^{2}) from Briggs and founded Santa Paula. Thomas R. Bard, representing Thomas Alexander Scott of the Philadelphia and California Petroleum Company arrived in Ventura in 1867 with the intent of purchasing land for oil exploration. During the early 1880s, Pennsylvania oil men Wallace Hardison and Lyman Stewart established the Hardison and Stewart Oil Company in Santa Paula. In 1890 several small oil companies owned by Hardison, Stewart and Bard combined to become the Union Oil Company.

After the patent was issued, a dispute arose over the boundary between Rancho Santa Paula y Saticoy and the adjacent Rancho Ex-Mission San Buenaventura.

When the St. Francis Dam broke in 1928 upstream a devastating flood came down the river, very wide at a speed of 5 miles (8 km) per hour, adding the rancho's river adjacent settlements to the losses and destruction.
