= Rancho Lompoc =

Land grant in California

Coordinates: 34.650°N 120.550°W

Rancho Lompoc was a 42,085-acre (170.31 km^{2}) Mexican land grant in present-day Santa Barbara County, California given in 1837 by Governor Juan B. Alvarado to Joaquín Carrillo and José Antonio Carrillo. The grant extended from present-day Lompoc west to the Pacific coast.

== History ==
Joaquín Carrillo and José Antonio Carrillo were the sons of Domingo Antonio Ygnacio Carrillo (1791–1837) and Maria Concepcion Nicanor Pico (1797–1871). José Joaquin Carrillo (1801-1868) married Manuela Carrillo and served as Santa Barbara County judge from 1851 to 1853. The Carrillo brothers were also granted Rancho Mission Vieja de la Purisma.

With the cession of California to the United States following the Mexican-American War, the 1848 Treaty of Guadalupe Hidalgo provided that the land grants would be honored. As required by the Land Act of 1851, a claim for Rancho Lompoc was filed with the Public Land Commission in 1853, and the grant was patented to Joaquín Carrillo and José Antonio Carrillo in 1873.

By 1855, the California cattle industry began to decline. In 1860, the Carillos sold Rancho Lompoc to the More brothers. By 1860, the More brothers were the largest landowner in Santa Barbara County (which at the time included all of present-day Ventura County). In addition to Rancho Lompoc, the More brothers owned the adjacent Rancho Mission Vieja de la Purisma and Rancho Santa Paula y Saticoy, Santa Rosa Island and Rancho Sespe. The droughts of the early 1860s forced the More brothers to dissolve their partnership and divide up their lands. Sheep barons from the midwest, Col. W.W. Hollister, W.H. Hollister and Joseph W. Cooper, along with Thomas Dibblee, purchased Rancho Lompoc and Rancho Mission Vieja de la Purisma in 1863.

In 1874, the Hollister-Dibblee partners sold the Rancho Lompoc to the Lompoc Land Company which was formed to establish a temperance colony.

== See also ==
- Ranchos of California
- List of Ranchos of California
