= Ripon, California =

City in California, United States

- City
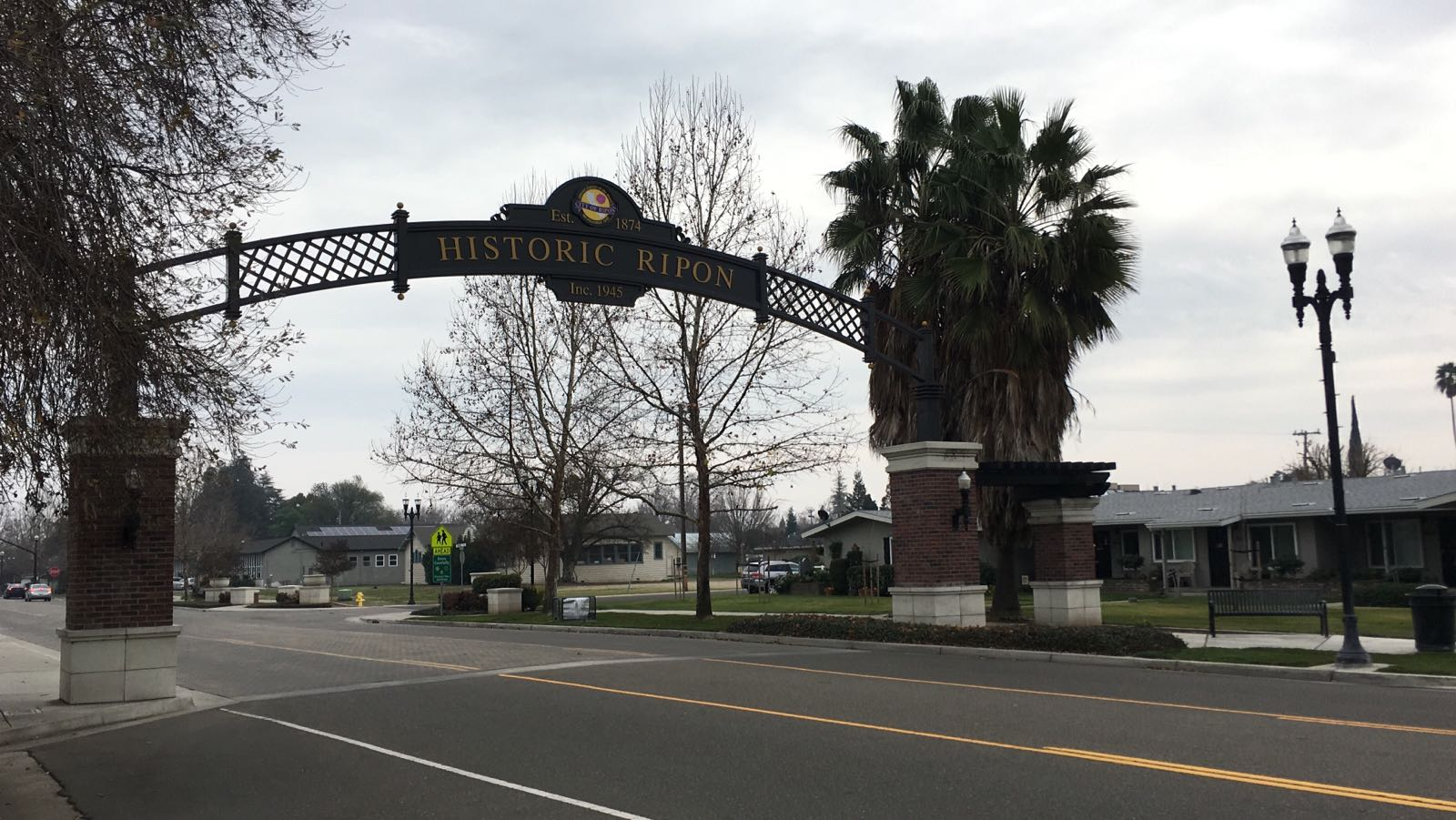
- Nickname: Almond Capital of the World
- Motto: "The Jewel of the Valley"
- Interactive map of Ripon, California
- Location in the United States
- Coordinates: 37°44′26″N 121°7′42″W
- Country: United States
- State: California
- County: San Joaquin
- Incorporated: November 27, 1945

Government
  - Mayor: Daniel De Graaf
  - State Senate: Jerry McNerney (D)
  - Assembly: Heath Flora (R)
  - U. S. Congress: Josh Harder (D)

Area
  - Total: 5.52 sq mi (14.29 km^{2})
  - Land: 5.32 sq mi (13.79 km^{2})
  - Water: 0.19 sq mi (0.50 km^{2}) 3.50%
- Elevation: 69 ft (21 m)

Population (2020)
  - Total: 16,013
  - Density: 3,007/sq mi (1,161.1/km^{2})
- Time zone: UTC-8 (PST)
  - Summer (DST): UTC-7 (PDT)
- ZIP code: 95366
- Area code: 209
- FIPS code: 06-61026
- GNIS feature ID: 0277615
- Website: City website

Ripon (/ˈrɪpən/) is a city located in San Joaquin County, California. The population was 16,013 at the 2020 census. Ripon was originally known as Stanislaus City, but was renamed for Ripon, Wisconsin, in 1876.

== History ==
Ripon, on the site previously known as Murphy's Ferry, Stanislaus City, and Stanislaus Station, was renamed for Ripon, Wisconsin, which was named for a city in North Yorkshire, England. Ripon's economy is largely agriculture based, known especially for its high production of almonds. In 1998, great expansion began for the city. Areas north of the Golden State (99) Freeway were slated for housing divisions, and huge swaths of agricultural land were slated for development. In 2003, the Jack Tone Road intersection was rebuilt, thus beginning a gigantic commercial development for two truck stops—Loves and the Flying J—that year. The next couple of years saw the addition of numerous restaurants and a shopping center.

== Geography ==
Ripon is located at 37°44′26″N 121°07′42″W (37.740478, -121.128224).

According to the United States Census Bureau, the city has a total area of 5.5 square miles (14.2 km^{2}), of which 5.3 square miles (13.7 km^{2}) is land and 0.2 square miles (0.5 km^{2}), comprising 3.50%, is water.

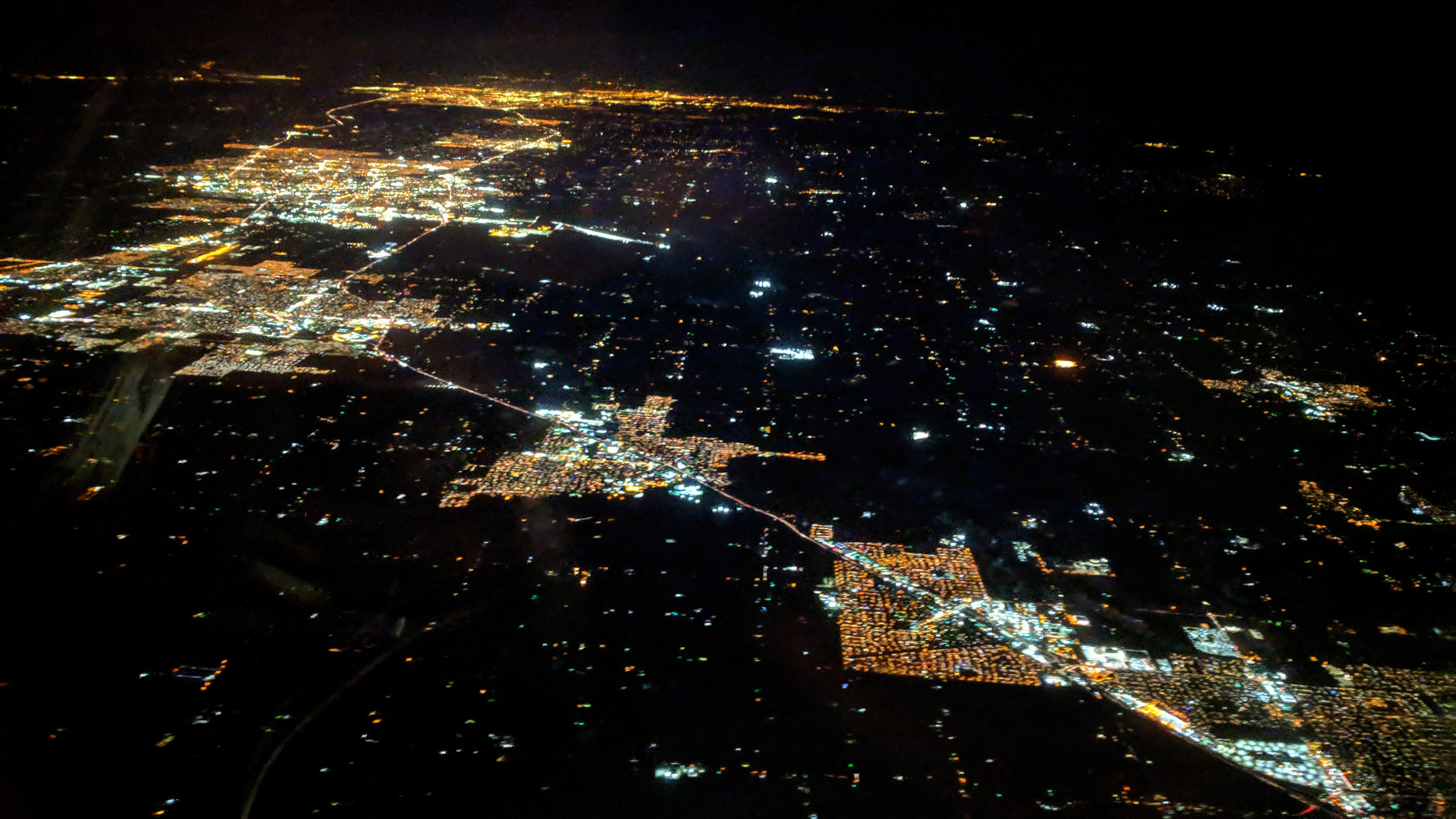
2018 night aerial view, looking north along California State Route 99. From bottom right, cities along the highway are Modesto, Salida, Ripon (center), Manteca, Stockton, Lodi, Sacramento.

== Demographics ==
Historical population
Census	Pop.	Note	%±
1950	1,550		—
1960	1,894		22.2%
1970	2,679		41.4%
1980	3,509		31.0%
1990	7,455		112.5%
2000	10,146		36.1%
2010	14,297		40.9%
2020	16,013		12.0%
U.S. Decennial Census

=== 2020 census ===
As of the 2020 census, Ripon had a population of 16,013 and a population density of 3,007.1 inhabitants per square mile (1,161.0/km^{2}). The median age was 38.2 years; 26.7% of residents were under the age of 18 and 16.1% were 65 years of age or older. For every 100 females, there were 94.8 males, and for every 100 females age 18 and over there were 90.4 males age 18 and over.

The census reported that 99.2% of the population lived in households, 2 people (0.0%) lived in non-institutionalized group quarters, and 122 people (0.8%) were institutionalized. 98.4% of residents lived in urban areas, while 1.6% lived in rural areas.

There were 5,469 households in Ripon, of which 40.7% had children under the age of 18 living in them. Of all households, 61.8% were married-couple households, 4.4% were cohabiting-couple households, 11.5% were households with a male householder and no spouse or partner present, and 22.3% were households with a female householder and no spouse or partner present. About 17.8% of all households were one-person households, and 9.8% had someone living alone who was 65 years of age or older. The average household size was 2.91. There were 4,249 families (77.7% of all households).

There were 5,658 housing units at an average density of 1,062.5 units per square mile (410.2 units/km^{2}), of which 5,469 (96.7%) were occupied. Of occupied units, 71.7% were owner-occupied and 28.3% were occupied by renters. There were 189 vacant housing units (3.3%). The homeowner vacancy rate was 1.0% and the rental vacancy rate was 4.3%.

Racial composition as of the 2020 census
Race	Number	Percent
White	10,858	67.8%
Black or African American	201	1.3%
American Indian and Alaska Native	147	0.9%
Asian	964	6.0%
Native Hawaiian and Other Pacific Islander	28	0.2%
Some other race	1,505	9.4%
Two or more races	2,310	14.4%
Hispanic or Latino (of any race)	3,999	25.0%

== Transportation ==
Ripon station is an Altamont Corridor Express commuter rail station planned to be constructed for service starting in 2027.

== Education ==
Students are served by five K–8 elementary schools (self-contained at all grade levels), and one high school by Ripon Unified School District, located in the Central Valley. All schools have Academic Performance Index (API) scores above 700. Three of the elementary schools have API scores above 800.

=== Schools ===
- Colony Oak Elementary - California Distinguished School
- Park View Elementary
- Ripon Elementary - California Distinguished School
- Ripona Elementary - opened 1965, California Distinguished School
- Weston Elementary - opened 1985, California Distinguished School
- Ripon High School
- Ripon Christian School
- Harvest High School

== Notable people ==
- Gay Jacobsen D'Asaro, fencing champion
- Walter Hawkins, Grammy Award-winning gospel artist
- Edward L. Kessel, biologist
- Kim Johnston Ulrich, actress
