= Chumash revolt of 1824 =

Revolt of Indigenous people against the Spanish and Mexican presence in Alta California

- Part of the Mexican Indian Wars
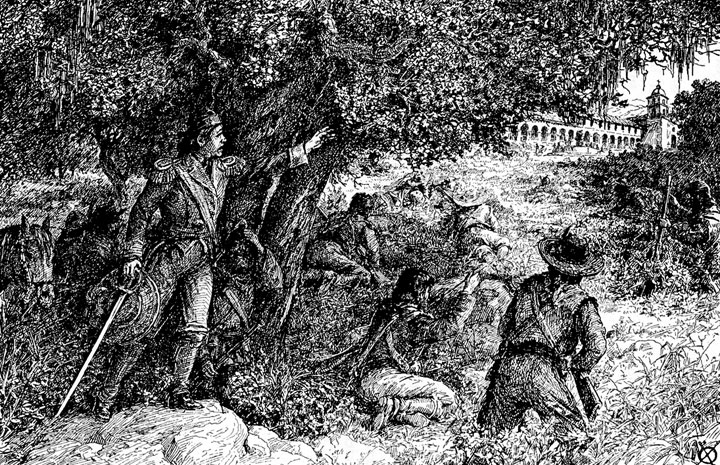
- 19th-century painting (by Alexander Harmer) depicting Mexican soldiers under fire by Chumash forces as they advance towards Mission Santa Barbara.
Date	February 21, 1824 – June 1824
Location	Mission Santa Inés, Mission Santa Barbara, La Purisima Mission
Result	Mexican victory: General pardon issued; Majority of rebels returned to the missions by late June 1824

Belligerents
Mexico	Chumash

Commanders and leaders
Luis Antonio Argüello	Andrés Sagimomatsee (surrendered)

Strength
300	2,000

Casualties and losses
8 killed	42 killed

The Chumash revolt of 1824 was an uprising of the Chumash against the Spanish and Mexican presence in their ancestral lands. The rebellion began in three of the California Missions in Alta California: Mission Santa Inés, Mission Santa Barbara, and Mission La Purisima, and spread to the surrounding villages. All three missions are located in present-day Santa Barbara County, California. The Chumash revolt was the largest organized resistance movement to occur during the Spanish and Mexican periods in California.

The Chumash planned a coordinated rebellion at all three missions. Due to an incident with a soldier at Mission Santa Inés on Saturday, February 21, the rebellion began early. Most of the Santa Inés mission complex was burned down. The Chumash withdrew from Mission Santa Inés upon the arrival of military reinforcements, then attacked Mission La Purisima from inside, forced the garrison to surrender, and allowed the garrison, their families, and the mission priest to depart for Santa Inés in peace. The next day, the Chumash of Mission Santa Barbara captured the mission from within without bloodshed, repelled a military attack on the mission, and then retreated from the mission to the hills. The Chumash continued to occupy Mission La Purisima until a Mexican military unit attacked people on March 16 and forced them to surrender. Two military expeditions were sent after the Chumash in the hills; the first in April 1824 did not find an enemy to fight and returned, while the second, in June, negotiated with the Chumash and convinced a majority to return to the missions by June 28. In total, the rebellion involved as many as three hundred Mexican soldiers, six Franciscan missionaries, and two thousand Chumash and Yokuts people of all ages and genders.

== Background ==
The Chumash were first encountered by Europeans in 1542, when explorer Juan Rodríguez Cabrillo's ships landed in Chumash territory. However, the Chumash's domain was not colonized by the Spaniards until 1772 when Mission San Luis Obispo de Tolosa, was established in Chumash lands. Mission San Buenaventura followed in 1782, Santa Barbara in 1786 and La Purisima in 1787, and finally Santa Ynez in 1804. Like many other Native American peoples who lived near the missions, some converted to Christianity, some merely used the missions as a survival tool to weather the drastic ecological and demographic changes that the Spanish unknowingly instigated, and some did not accept the Spanish at all.

Spanish ships carrying supplies and payments for the soldiers and missionaries stopped after 1810. The presidios pressed the missions for more supplies, and the missionaries pressed the mission Natives to work longer hours and be more productive. The Natives did not receive additional compensation for their extra labor. In addition, the independence of Mexico from Spain in 1821 brought about an economic depression to the region.

The Franciscans increased their efforts to suppress Chumash culture after 1820, leading to increased resentment of the missionaries. Rumors of impending violence among both the soldiers and the Natives were common by the early 1820s, and the Chumash spent months in preparation for the uprising. The Native Americans were aided in their preparations by having been armed with bows, spears, and machetes and trained in European military tactics to be able to defend the missions against a pirate who attacked Alta California in 1818. The Chumash reached out diplomatically to the neighboring Yokuts, and some Yokuts villages sent an indeterminate number of men to assist with the insurrection.

Political considerations from Mexican independence in 1821 from the Spanish Empire must also be taken into consideration for the Chumash motive to rebel. The Spanish Constitution of 1812 established a precedent for the equality of Native Americans with Europeans, and was created with participation from delegates originating in Spanish territories throughout the American continents. This constitution gave full citizenship rights to all persons in the Spanish colonial holdings, regardless of social or ethnic status. It also outlawed requiring Natives to pay tribute and the practices of forced labor and corporal punishment. The constitution itself was short lived; the official who went to Alta California to put the constitution in place was informed that it had officially been rescinded prior to his arrival, but the official continued to try to build support for the spirit of the law.

Later, the Mexican declaration of independence of 1821 "abolished all distinctions among Europeans, Africans, and Indians", and a Mexican government decree the following year outlawed the term "indio" from use, to be replaced with the word "citizen". A commissioner was appointed by the Mexican government to spread the word of the new policy throughout California and to implement government bodies responsible for carrying out the policy in 1822. Fray Payeras recorded that one quarter of the Native Americans in his mission voiced approval for the Mexican message of liberty. The Chumash people at Missions Santa Inés, Santa Bárbara, and La Purísima had heard both the Spanish and Mexican governments promise them equal treatment under the law; being mistreated by the soldiers of the presidios or the Franciscans of the missions could now incite much more outrage than it previously could, since persons committing wrongs against the Chumash were breaking their own nation's laws.

Historian James Sandos argues that the Chumash rebellion was planned with a desire to create a new society, independent and outside of the missions, designed with a mixture of Chumash and Christian religious ideas and using European style farming and ranching as their means of economic support.

== First stage of the conflict ==
It was in this environment of economic stresses, social changes and ethnic conflict that the rebellion began. On February 21, 1824, a young Chumash boy from Mission La Purisima was severely beaten by a Mexican soldier when he was visiting a relative imprisoned inside the Mission Santa Inés guardhouse. This act caused the Chumash neophytes in the mission to begin the planned rebellion early, attacking the soldiers with arrows and setting multiple buildings on fire. Approximately 554 Natives participated in the revolt at Mission Santa Ines. After a heated battle with many wounded and the arrival of Chumash reinforcements, the mission's priest and soldiers barricaded themselves inside a building, where they waited to be rescued until the next day by a detachment of Mexican troops from the Presidio of Santa Barbara. The soldiers forced the Santa Inés rebels into the neophyte housing of the mission, which they promptly burnt down to flush the Chumash out. In the struggle at Mission Santa Ines on the first day, 15 Chumash women and children died, 4 men died in the fires, and one Mexican soldier was killed.

Most of the Chumash fled to the two nearest missions, Santa Barbara and La Purisima, to inform their fellow Chumash of the revolt, and to join them. Approximately 722 of the Chumash at La Purisima had joined the rebellion. Mission La Purisima was captured by the Chumash; the soldiers and their families and two Franciscans took shelter in a storeroom. One Chumash man was killed in the initial fighting at La Purisima. Four Mexican settlers passing by the mission seemingly by chance were killed by the Chumash. As many as 1,270 Chumash fortified La Purisima, erecting wooden palisades and cutting gun loops out of the mission's walls, arming themselves with the mission's muskets. The Chumash kept the soldiers and their families for three days and then released them without violence, along with Friar Blas Ordaz; Friar Antonio Rodriguez stayed behind inside the mission, and the Native Americans made known their intention to hold and defend the mission.

Simultaneously, Mission Santa Barbara was also captured by the Chumash inside the mission, who forced the mission's soldiers, clergy and civilians to retreat to the nearby Santa Barbara Presidio without bloodshed. The alcalde at Mission Santa Barbara used subterfuge to gain the rebellion there the upper hand since the element of surprise was lost. Some of the Chumash men escorted the women and children into the hills, taking the mission's livestock and provisions and other goods with them. The rest of the Chumash men stayed to fight the soldiers coming from the nearby presidio. As they expected, a small force of Mexican troops and priests arrived at the mission from the presidio, attempting to negotiate the surrender of the Santa Barbara Natives. The Chumash refused, a battle was fought, ending with two Chumash killed and three wounded, and four Mexican soldiers wounded. The Mexican detachment retreated to the presidio, and the Chumash defenders followed the first group into the hills.

At this point in the conflict, the Chumash only held Mission La Purisima. More than 1,200 Native Americans occupied the mission, though only approximately 400 of those were warriors. They were fully in control of the mission itself, its resources, and the fields and orchards around it. The Mexican authorities did not directly respond until March 14, 1824, when 109 soldiers, including infantry, cavalry, and one cannon left San Luis Obispo with the intent to retake Mission La Purisima; two Native Americans from San Luis Obispo left ahead of the military column to warn those occupying La Purisima.

The Mexican soldiers began attacking Mission La Purisima on the morning of 16 March. The Native Americans fought back with musket fire, arrows, and a cannon. The battle lasted two and a half hours, during which the soldiers cut off all avenues of retreat out of the mission. After the Natives had suffered sixteen killed and a number more wounded, they asked Friar Antonio Rodriguez, who had stayed inside the mission with them, to negotiate a truce. The soldiers accepted the surrender of the Native Americans, seizing "two cannons, sixteen muskets, 150 lances, six machetes, and an incalculable number of bows and arrows." The Mexicans had only suffered one death and two wounded in the battle.

== Second stage of the conflict ==
The mission had been retaken, but most of the Native Americans were still living in exile in the hills, supported by alliances made mostly among the Yokuts people through gifting them supplies and goods taken from the missions. Back in control of the developed areas, the Mexicans reacted judicially to the rebellion through military tribunals of some of the captured Native peoples and having a general travel to five missions in the area and give speeches to the Native Americans there, threatening them all with death if the revolt did not end.

The first Mexican military expedition against the rebels began on 11 April and marched five days to reach Yokuts territory. While en route, the column killed four Native American people, suffering three wounded soldiers. The expedition ended, turning back to the presidio, when faced with a severe wind and dust storm and the leader, Don Narciso Fabregat, decided that they must turn back.

Food became a problem both in the missions and in the refugee-filled hills. The missions had very few Native Americans present to perform the manual labor necessary to produce food, while the Yokuts villages had many more mouths to feed than they were accustomed to supporting.

In May 1824, Friar Ripoll of Mission Santa Barbara wrote an appeal to the governor of California that defended and explained the actions of the Chumash with the hope that the governor would pardon the rebels. The angle Ripoll's letter took was that the Native Americans were still minors who needed to be taken care of, in the old Franciscan style of viewing themselves as fathers to the "Indians" who were all children. He ignored completely the Mexican empire's policy of equality for all persons in the state's territory. The explanation was accepted by the governor, who issued a general pardon to all who had participated in the revolt, other than those already convicted at military tribunals, and the pardon was announced on May 16, 1824.

== Reconciliation ==
Three separate military expeditions were sent to inform the Chumash that they had been pardoned, and they could come back to the missions in peace. The main expedition of 130 troops left Mission Santa Barbara on June 2, 1824. The leaders of the Chumash met with the leaders of the expedition, which included General Pablo de la Portillo and Friars Sarria and Ripoll, on June 8. After this initial meeting went well, a second meeting was held on June 11 with a much larger group of the exiles. The pardon was explained to the gathered Chumash, who accepted it; a celebratory mass was held on June 13.

For the next week, soldiers and Native American leaders traveled through the area to find more exiles to ask them to return to the missions. The first returning Native peoples arrived at Santa Barbara on June 16, and the arrivals continued for weeks. By June 28, approximately 816 out of the original population of 1,000 had returned.

Celebrations were held at the missions to commemorate the peace and return of the Native Americans, and Yokuts were invited to attend as well. By the next year, only "four men and two or three women" had not returned to the missions.
