= Rancho Sespe =

Mexican land grant in Ventura County, California

Coordinates: 34.400°N 118.970°W

Rancho Sespe was a 8,881-acre (35.94 km^{2}) Mexican land grant in present-day Ventura County, California given in 1833 by Governor José Figueroa to Carlos Antonio Carrillo. The grant encompassed the Santa Clara River Valley between Piru Creek on the east and Santa Paula Creek on the west, and was bounded to the north and south by the mountains, and included present day Fillmore.

== History ==
Carlos Antonio Carrillo (1783 – 1852), the son of José Raimundo Carrillo of the prominent Santa Barbara family, had been elected to the assembly and was later Governor of Alta California from 1837 to 1838. Carrillo claimed the Sespe grant was for six square leagues (approximately 26,000 acres (105 km^{2})). Carrillo took possession of the grant in 1842 and as required, built an adobe house; although the Carrillo family remained in Santa Barbara. Carrillo died in 1852 and his wife Josefa died in 1853. Thomas Wallace More and his brothers, Andrew and Henry, purchased the entire rancho in 1854 from the estate of Josefa Carrillo.

With the cession of California to the United States following the Mexican-American War, the 1848 Treaty of Guadalupe Hidalgo provided that the land grants would be honored. As required by the Land Act of 1851, a claim for Rancho Sespe was filed by Carrillo with the Public Land Commission in 1852, and six square leagues confirmed in 1856. But the U.S. government appealed the confirmation based on evidence that the Expediente had been altered from two square leagues to read six square leagues. Complicating the dispute, More's attorney, Hinchman, agreed to the government's much smaller description of Rancho Sespe without the More's approval.

By 1860, the More brothers were the largest landowner in Santa Barbara County (which at the time included all of present-day Ventura County). Besides Rancho Sespe, the More brothers owned the neighboring Rancho Santa Paula y Saticoy, and also owned Santa Rosa Island, Rancho Lompoc and Rancho Mission Vieja de la Purisma. The drought of 1863 and 1864 forced the More brothers to dissolve their partnership and divide up their lands. T.W. More took control of Rancho Sespe and inherited the difficulties surrounding its legal boundaries.

In 1865, the US Supreme Court dismissed More's appeal of the decision. Two surveys of Rancho Sespe were made by Charles F. Hoffmann. The first survey in 1868 was 25,361 acres (102.6 km^{2}) (approximately six square leagues) and included 5,780 acres (23.4 km^{2}) of the river bed. This survey was submitted and rejected. The second survey with 8,881 acres (35.9 km^{2}) (approximately two square leagues) in two tracts on either side of the Santa Clara River, with a wide tract of river bed between was accepted and patented to T.W. More in 1872.

Settlers, or squatters as they were also called, began to arrive in the Santa Clara River Valley seeking public lands during the mid to late 1860s, following the American Civil War. Rancho Santa Paula y Saticoy to the west was subdivided in 1867, and many settlers purchased land in the area west of Santa Paula. Settlers hoping to avail themselves of free land offered by the Homestead Act had to locate available public lands. It was often difficult for homesteaders to know if they were settling on public or private lands.

T.W. More continued to fight for the rest of his six square leagues, angering the Sespe Settlers League, who had banded together to protect their homesteads. More filed an application in 1875 to buy the remaining four square leagues from the government under the "pre-emption" laws of 1866. This application was denied by the U.S. Land Office in 1875. When, during the drought of 1876–1877, More began to trench an irrigation ditch on his land, the settlers believed that More was seeking to deprive them of water rights from the Sespe Creek and Santa Clara River, further angering the settlers. On March 24, 1877, T.W. More was shot and killed while attempting to extinguish a barn fire on his ranch. Following More's death in 1877, the U.S. Land Office overturned the 1875 ruling, allowing More's heirs to buy the disputed lands. This decision was overturned on appeal, in 1878. With the exception of settlers who purchased land from the heirs of T.W. More, when they began to subdivide their property during the 1880s, the majority of residents who finally settled in the Rancho Sespe area, had homesteaded their land.

M.B. Hull acquired Rancho Sespe in 1888. Hull died in 1895 and his son and daughter inherited the property. Eudora Hull Spalding bought out her brother share of the property, which was now about 2,200 acres. Spalding (whose husband Keith was the son of Albert Spalding) owned the ranch and expanded it until her death in 1942. The ranch was willed to the California Institute of Technology who owned it until 1973. Rancho Sespe was then owned in succession by Hillman and Prudential Insurance. Newport Beach Development acquired the ranch in 1979 and sold it in 1987. The ranch was sold in parcels starting in 1988. A historic bunkhouse from Rancho Sespe was donated to the Fillmore Historical Museum in 1995.

== See also ==
- Santa Clara River Valley
- Santa Clara River (California)
- Sespe Creek
