= La Purísima Mission =

18th-century Spanish mission in California

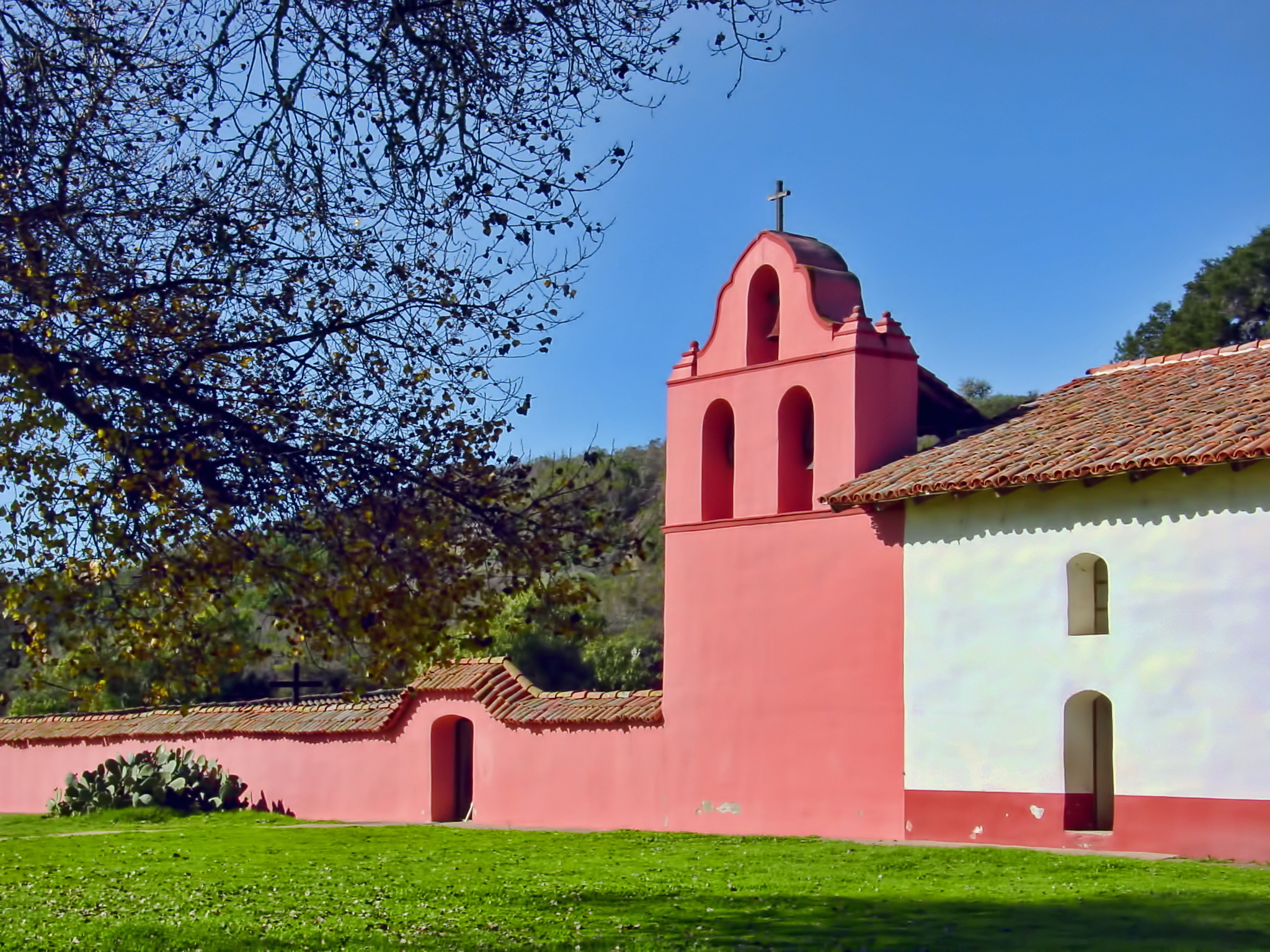
- La Purísima Mission

- Location within California Location within the United States
- Location: 2295 Purisima Road, Lompoc, Santa Barbara County, California 93436
- Coordinates: 34°40′13.692″N 120°25′14.2206″W
- Name as founded: La Misión de La Purísima Concepción de la Santísima Virgen María
- English translation: The Mission of the Immaculate Conception of the Most Blessed Virgin Mary
- Patron: The Immaculate Conception of the Most Blessed Virgin Mary
- Nickname: "The Linear Mission"
- Founded: December 8, 1787
- Founded by: Father Fermín Lasuén
- Founding Order: Eleventh
- Headquarters of the Alta California Mission System: 1815–1819
- Military district: Second
- Native tribe(s) Spanish name(s): Chumash; Purisimeño
- Native place name: Laxshakupi, 'Amuwu
- Baptisms: 3,255
- Marriages: 1,030
- Burials: 2,609
- Secularized: 1834
- Returned to the Church: 1874
- Governing body: California Department of Parks and Recreation
- Current use: Museum

U.S. National Register of Historic Places
- Designated: 1970
- Reference no.: #NPS-70000147

U.S. National Historic Landmark
- Designated: 1970

California Historical Landmark
- Reference no.: #340

Website
- https://www.parks.ca.gov/?page_id=598

Mission La Purísima Concepción, or La Purísima Mission (originally La Misión de la Purísima Concepción de la Santísima Virgen María, or The Mission of the Immaculate Conception of the Most Blessed Virgin Mary) is a Spanish mission in Lompoc, California. It was established on December 8, 1787 (the Feast of the Immaculate Conception, hence the mission's name) by the Franciscan order. The original mission complex south of Lompoc was destroyed by an earthquake in 1812, and the mission was rebuilt at its present site a few miles to the northeast.

The mission is part of the larger La Purísima Mission State Historic Park, part of the California State Parks system, and along with Mission San Francisco de Solano is one of only two of the Spanish missions in California that is no longer governed by the Catholic Church. It is currently the only example in California of a complete Spanish Catholic mission complex, and was designated a National Historic Landmark in 1970.

== History ==
=== Original mission ===
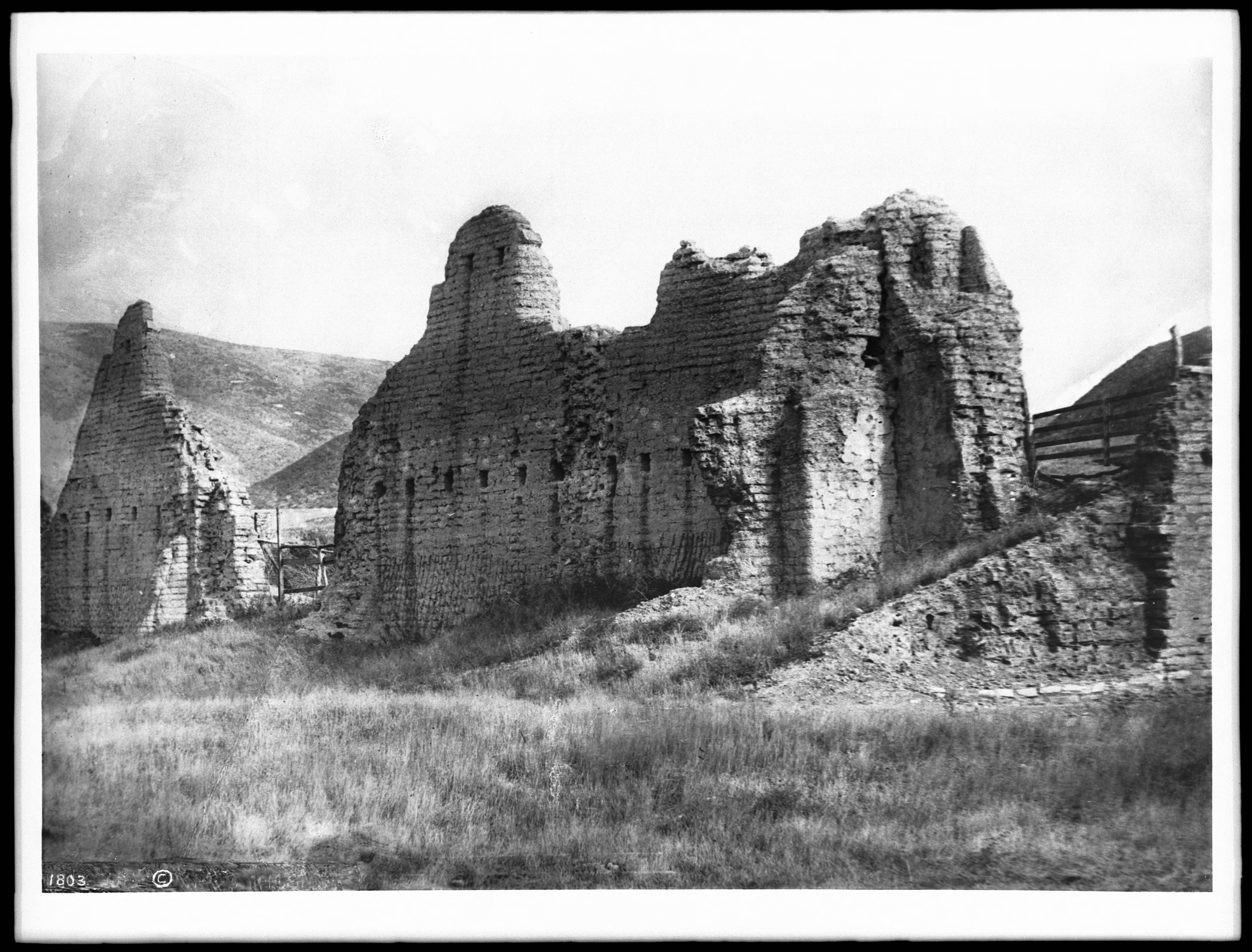
Ruins of Mission La Purisima Concepcion, ca.1885-1904

Mission La Purísima was originally established at a site known to the Chumash people as Algsacpi and to the Spanish as the plain of Río Santa Rosa, one mile south of Lompoc. (During the mission period, the Chumash spoke the Purisimeño language.) The Viceroyalty of New Spain made an exception to the rule that no California mission was to be established within seven miles of any pueblo in Las Californias, as Lompoc was so small. The site was the location of the mission from its founding on December 8, 1787, by Fermín Lasuén till it was destroyed by the 1812 Ventura earthquake on December 21, 1812. The original mission was associated with the Presidio of Santa Barbara. Fermín Lasuén (1736–1803) was a Spanish Franciscan missionary to Alta California and the president of the Franciscan missions. He was the founder of nine of the twenty-one Spanish missions in California including original Mission La Purísima, the 11th mission.

By 1803, the Mission Indian population had increased, by Indian Reductions, to 1,436 Chumash people. At the mission there were also 3,230 cattle, 5,400 sheep, 306 horses, and 39 mules. In the same year, there was a harvest of 690 fanegas of wheat, corn and beans (a fanega equaling about 220 pounds).

The mission grew from its founding to be 330 feet square quadrangle made of adobe bricks. The original mission had many rooms for the two priests, the evangelized Chumash and for a chapel, six soldiers, married Indians and unmarried females. At its peak about 1,520 Chumash Indian lived at the mission. The original mission was south of the Santa Ynez River and included vast crop and grazing lands.

An earthquake on December 21, 1812, severely damaged the mission buildings.

The site became a California State Historical Landmark No. 928 on June 29, 1979. Ruins of the original mission are at 508 South F Street, near East Locust Avenue in Lompoc, California. The California State Historical Landmark reads:

NO. 928 SITE OF ORIGINAL MISSION AND REMAINING RUINS OF BUILDINGS OF MISSION DE LA PURÍSIMA CONCEPCIÓN DE MARÍA SANTISIMA - The ruins at this site are part of the original Mission La Purísima, founded by Padre Fermín de Lasuén on December 8, 1787, as the 11th in the chain of Spanish Missions in California. The mission was destroyed by earthquake on December 12, 1812, the present Mision (mission) La Purisima was then established several miles away.

=== Second mission ===
Mariano Payeras received permission to relocate the mission community 4 miles (6.4 km) to the northeast in La Cañada de los Berros, next to El Camino Real. La Purísima Mission was officially established in its new location on April 23, 1813. Materials salvaged from the buildings destroyed by the earthquake were used to construct the new buildings four miles northeast of the pueblo at their present location, which was known to the Chumash as Amúu, and to the Spanish as La Cañada de los Berros. The buildings were completed within ten years.

=== Chumash revolt of 1824 ===
After Mexico won the Mexican War of Independence in 1823, Spanish funding ceased to the Santa Barbara Presidio. Many soldiers at the mission who were no longer being paid by the new Mexican government took out their frustrations on the local Chumash Indians. After a soldier apparently beat an Indian at nearby Mission Santa Inés, the Chumash revolt of 1824 began at that mission. It spread to La Purísima Mission, where the Chumash people took over the mission for one month until more soldiers arrived from Monterey Presidio. The Chumash lost their hold on the mission with many leaving the mission soon thereafter. Many of the Indians who had sought refuge in the neighboring mountains during the revolt returned to the mission.

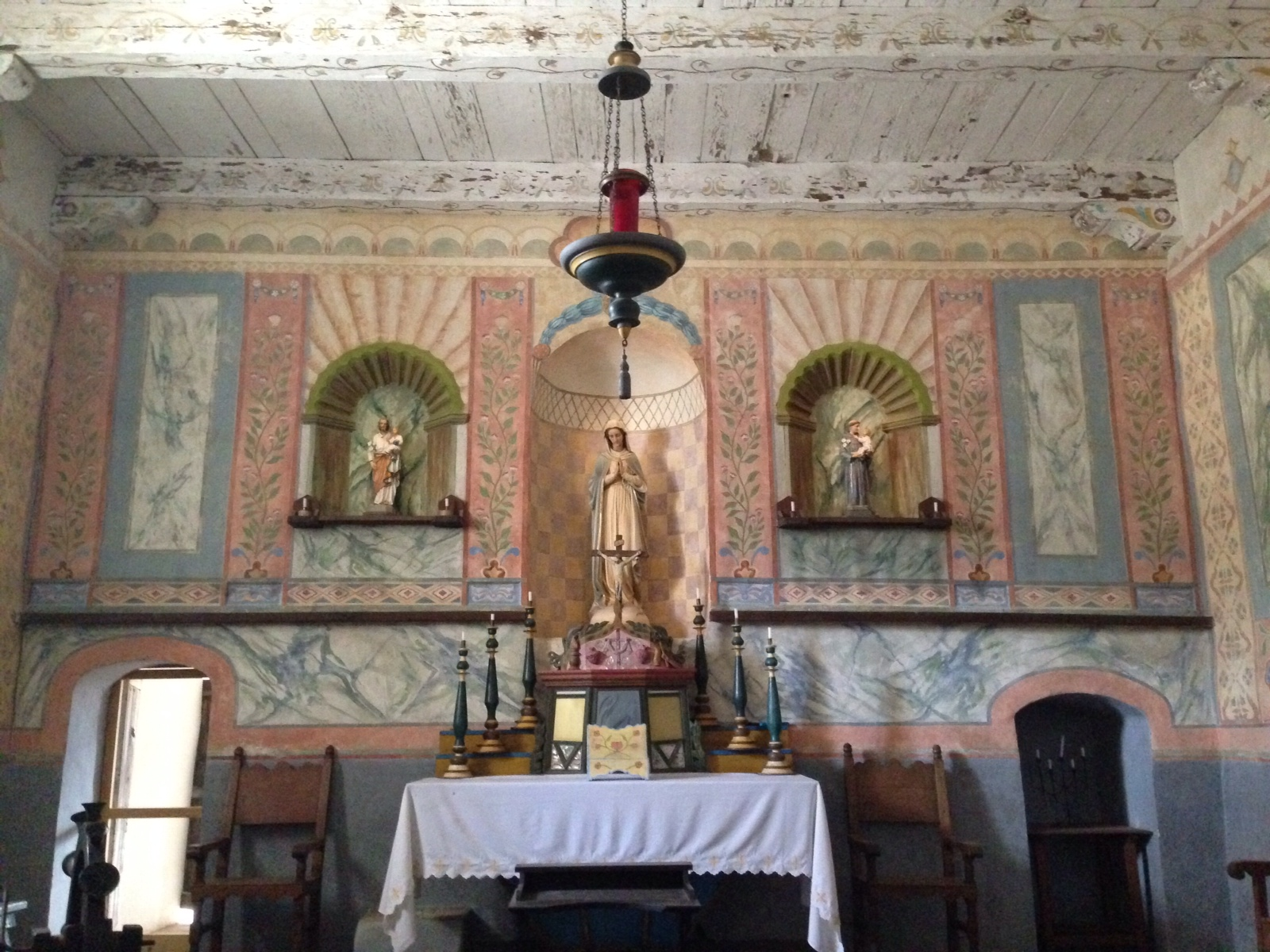
The altar inside La Purísima Mission.

Following independent Mexico's secularization of the Alta California missions from 1834 to 1843, the buildings of La Purísima Mission were abandoned. The Mexican government, which had gained independence from Spain, transferred control of the missions from the Catholic Church to civil authorities. The property passed into private ownership and the mission buildings fell into ruin; the lands were granted to the Rancho Ex-Mission la Purisima.

=== 20th century ===
In 1933 the Union Oil Company deeded several parcels to the State of California. By 1934, only nine of the buildings remained intact.

In the 20th century, under direction of the National Park Service, the Civilian Conservation Corps (CCC) pledged to restore the mission if enough land could be provided to convert it into a historic landmark. The Catholic Church and the Union Oil Company donated sufficient land for the CCC to proceed with the restoration. The nine buildings as well as many small structures and the original water system were fully restored with the mission's dedication occurring on December 7, 1941, the same day the United States entered World War II. Today, La Purísima Mission is the only example in California of a complete mission complex.

As of 2011 it was considered to be the most completely restored Spanish mission in California. Ten of the original buildings are fully restored and furnished, including the church, shops, quarters, and blacksmith shop. The mission gardens and livestock represent what would have been found at the mission during the 1820s. Special living history events are scheduled throughout the year. A visitor center features information, displays and artifacts, and a self-guided tour gives visitors the opportunity to step back in time for a glimpse of a brief, turbulent period in California's history.

In 2025, the mission was a filming location for the Paul Thomas Anderson directed One Battle After Another starring Leonardo DiCaprio, Sean Penn and Chase Infiniti.

== La Purísima Mission State Historic Park ==
La Purísima Mission is now part of the La Purísima Mission State Historic Park within the California State Parks System. Located outside Lompoc, California, the 1,934-acre (783 ha) park was established in 1935. With a visitor center and guided tours, the historic park is maintained by the California Department of Parks and Recreation (DPR). La Purísima is located in Lompoc, in the county of Santa Barbara, California.

La Purísima Mission State Historic Park was one of many state parks threatened with closure in 2008. Those closures were ultimately avoided by cutting hours and maintenance system-wide.

== Historic designations ==
- National Register of Historic Places #NPS-78000775 – original La Purisima Mission site.
- National Register of Historic Places #NPS-70000147 – La Purisima Mission State Historic Park.
- California Historical Landmark #928 – original La Purisima Mission site.
- Juan Bautista de Anza National Historic Trail – a designated Historic Site on the route of this National Park Service United States National Historic Trail

== Gallery ==
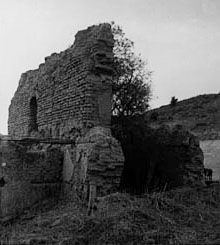
The ruins of Mission La Purísima Concepción, c. 1900.

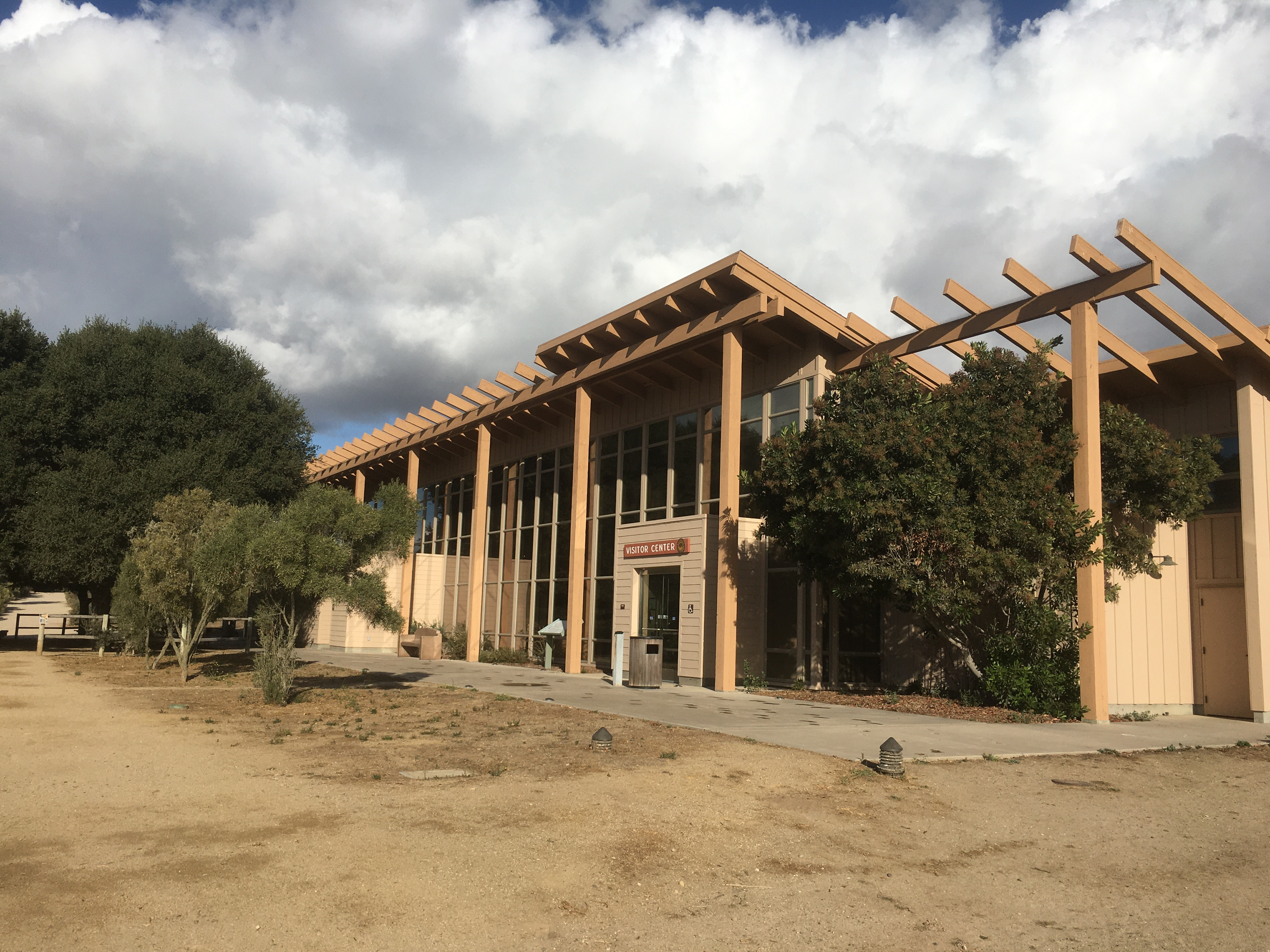
Visitor Center at La Purisima Mission State Historical Park

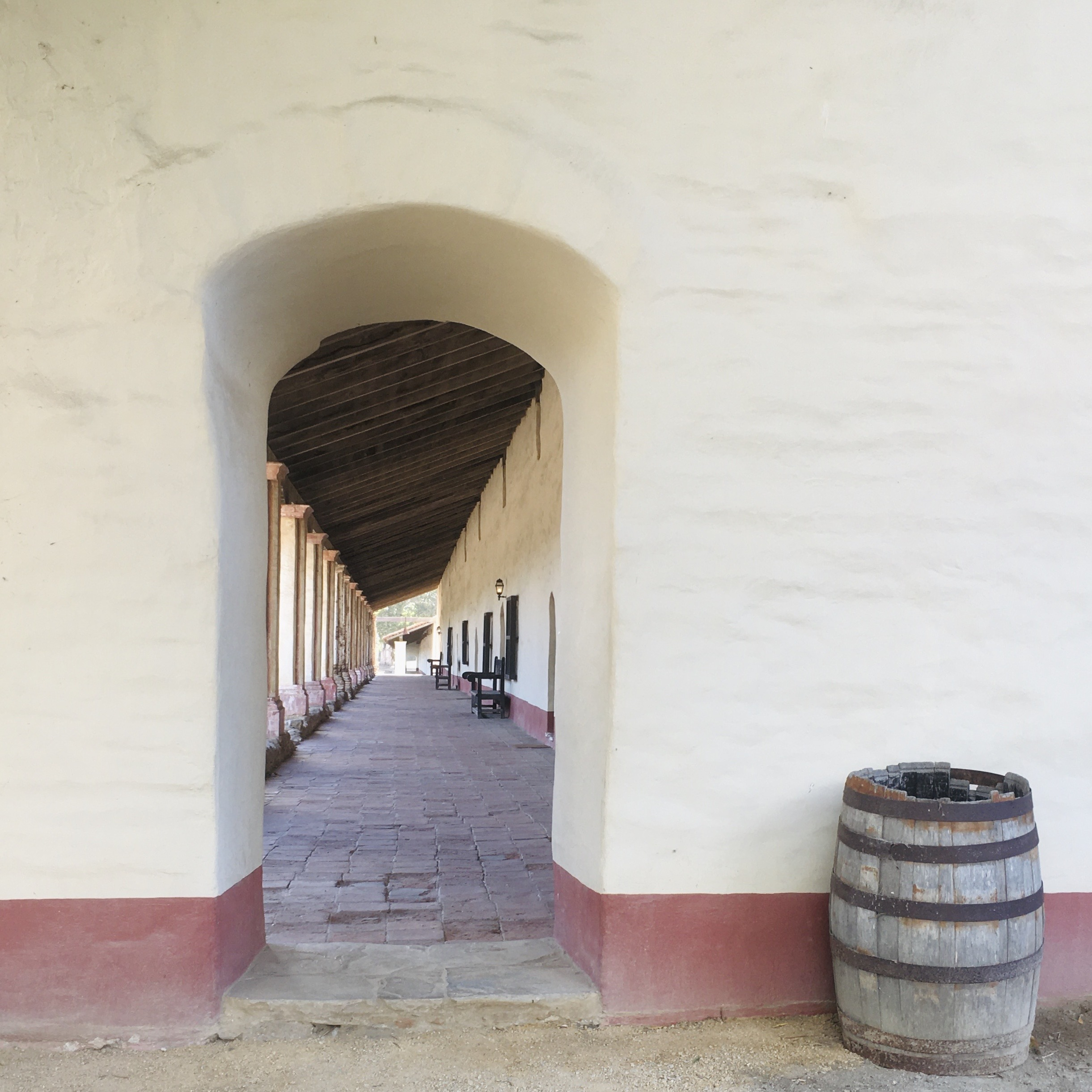
Side view of La Purisima Mission

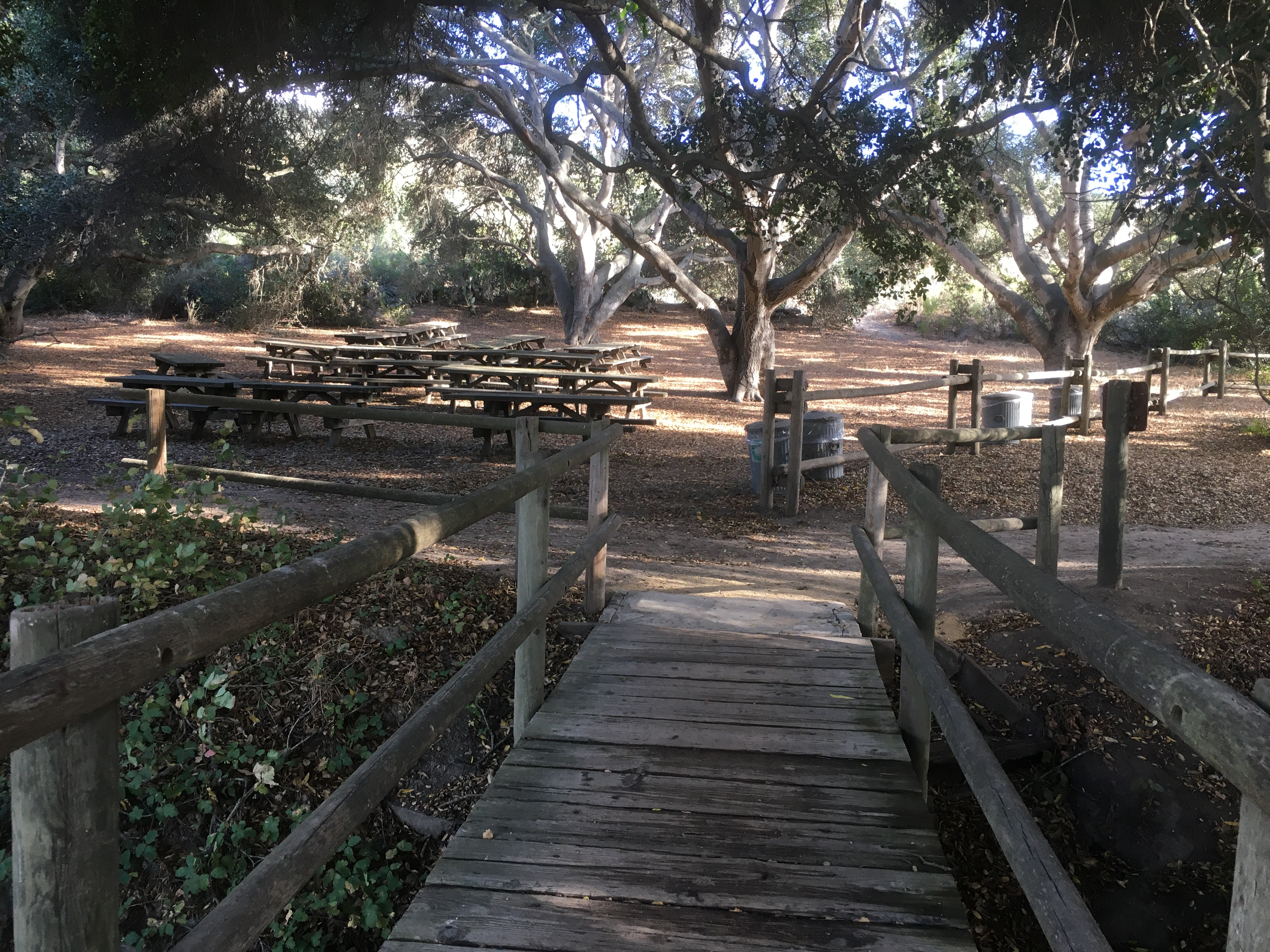
La Purisima Mission State Historical Park picnic area

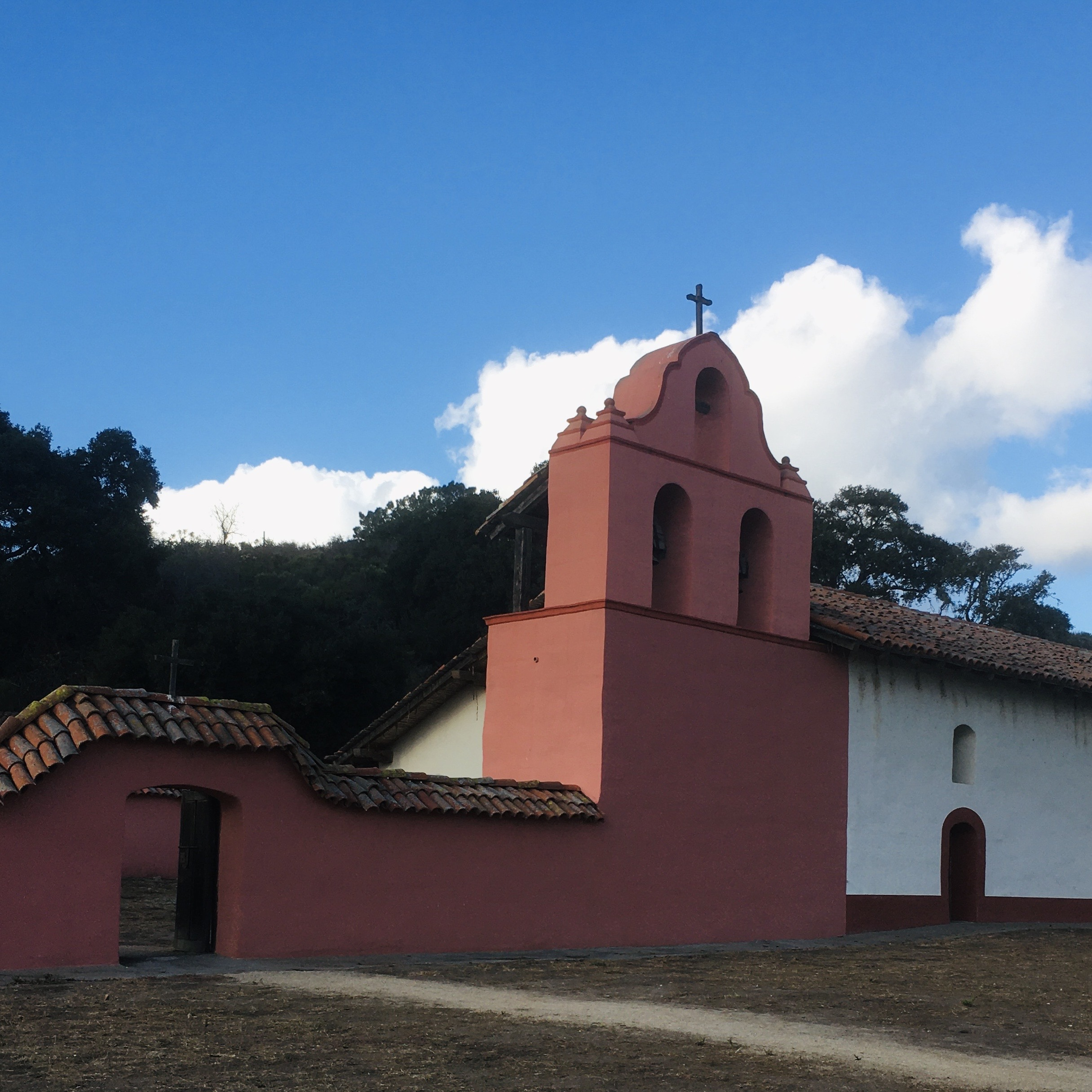
Bell Tower of La Purisima Mission

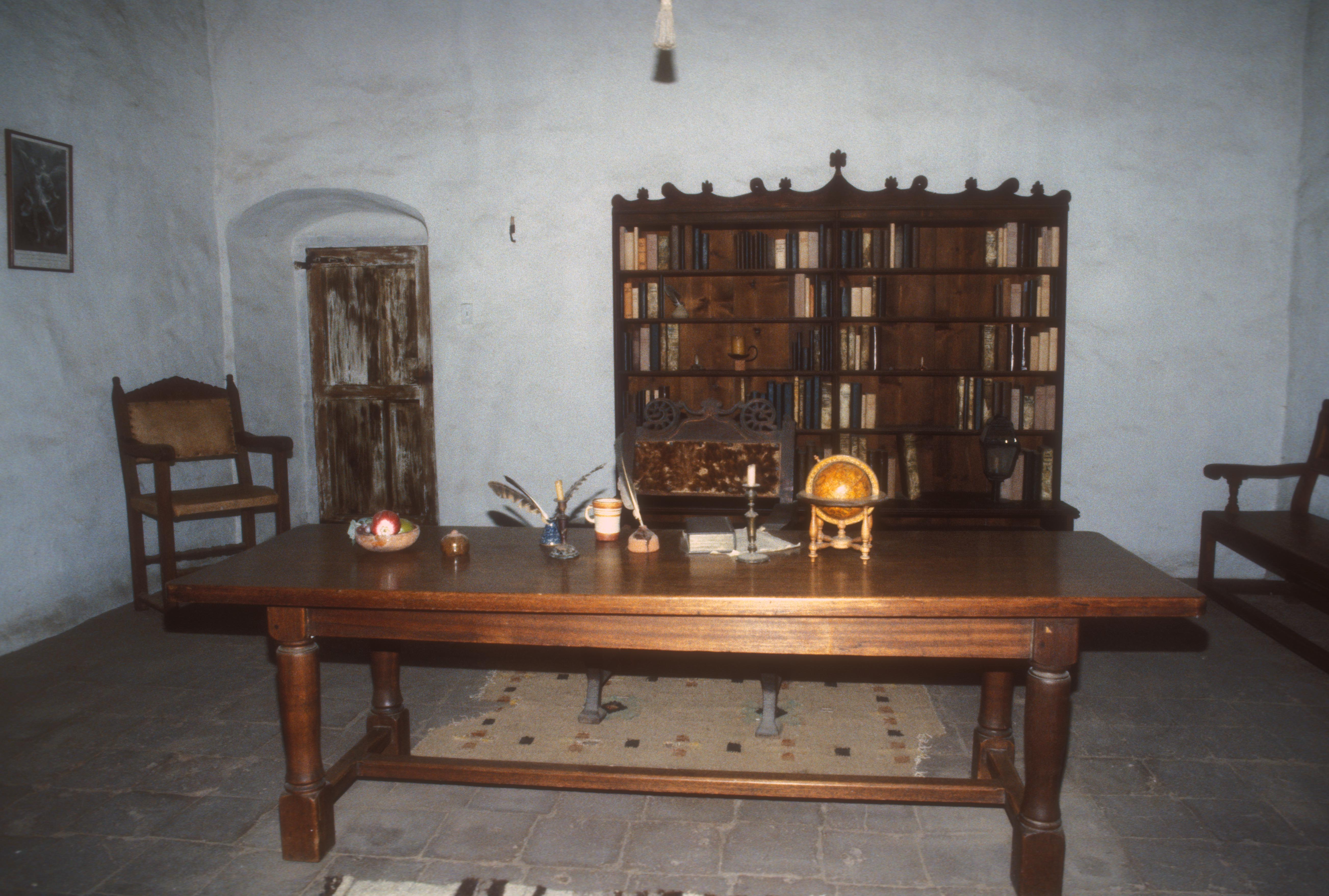
Library

== See also ==
- Spanish missions in California
- List of Spanish missions in California
- List of National Historic Landmarks in California
- History of Santa Barbara, California
- California Historical Landmarks in Santa Barbara County, California
- USNS Mission Purisima (AO-118) – a Buenaventura Class fleet oiler built during World War II.

== Notes ==
- This article contains material from the California Department of Parks and Recreation which, unless otherwise indicated, is in the public domain.
