= Health and appearance of Michael Jackson =

Medical history of American celebrity

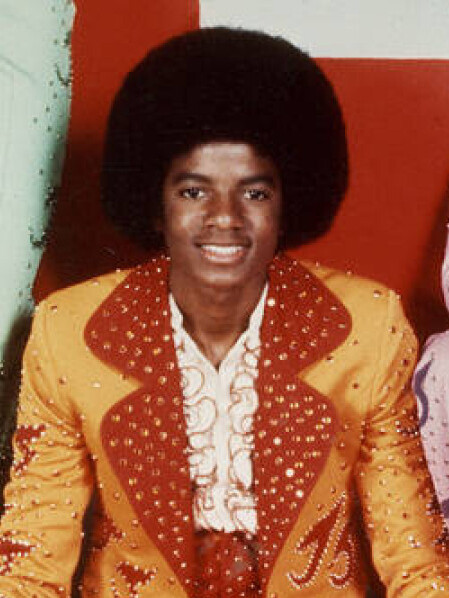
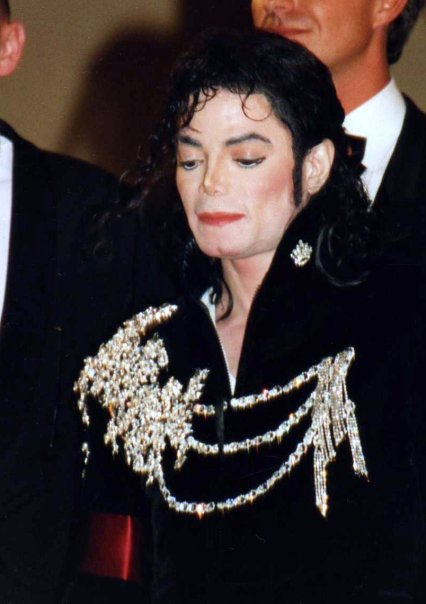
Michael Jackson in 1976 at age 17 (left) and 1997 at age 38 (right)

Michael Jackson (1958–2009) was an American entertainer who spent over four decades in the public eye, first as a child star with the Jackson 5 and later as a solo artist. From the mid-1980s, Jackson's appearance began to change dramatically. The changes to his face triggered widespread speculation of extensive cosmetic surgery, and his skin tone became much lighter.

Jackson was diagnosed with the skin disorder vitiligo, which results in white patches on the skin and sensitivity to sunlight. To treat the condition, he used fair-colored makeup and possibly skin-lightening prescription creams to cover up the uneven blotches of color caused by the illness. The lighter skin and Jackson's nonconfirmation of his diagnosis resulted in speculation that he was trying to appear white. Jackson revealed he had vitiligo in 1993, and said he had not purposely bleached his skin and that he was proud to be black.

Jackson and some of his siblings said they had been physically and psychologically abused by their father Joe Jackson. In 2003, Joe admitted to whipping them as children, but he emphatically rejected the longstanding abuse allegations. The whippings deeply traumatized Jackson and may have led to the onset of further health problems later in his life.

At some point during the 1990s, it appeared that Jackson had become dependent on prescription drugs, mainly painkillers and strong sedatives. The drug use was later linked to second- and third-degree burns he had suffered years before. Jackson gradually became dependent on these drugs, and his health deteriorated. He went into rehabilitation in 1993. While preparing for a series of comeback concerts scheduled to begin in July 2009, Jackson died of acute propofol and benzodiazepine intoxication after suffering cardiac arrest on June 25, 2009. Conrad Murray, his personal physician, was convicted of involuntary manslaughter in his death and sentenced to four years in prison.

== Skin color ==
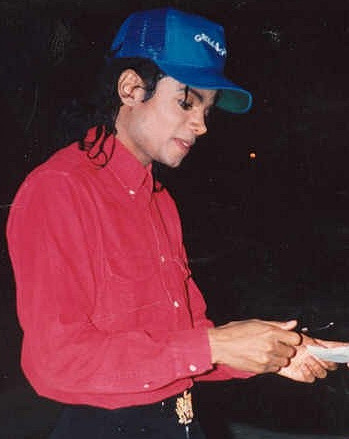
Jackson in 1988, after his skin transformation from medium brown to pale

Jackson's skin had been medium-brown during his youth, but from the mid-1980s, it gradually grew paler. The change drew widespread media coverage, including speculation that he had been bleaching his skin. Jackson's dermatologist, Arnold Klein, said he observed in 1983 that Jackson had vitiligo, a condition characterized by patches of the skin losing their pigment. He also identified discoid lupus erythematosus in Jackson. He diagnosed Jackson with lupus that year, and with vitiligo in 1986.

Vitiligo's drastic effects on the body can cause psychological distress. Jackson used fair-colored makeup and skin-bleaching prescription creams to cover up the uneven blotches of color caused by the illness. The creams further lightened his skin, and, with the application of makeup, he could appear very pale. The cause of vitiligo is unknown, but it is believed to be due to genetic susceptibility triggered by an environmental factor such that an autoimmune disease occurs. When Jackson was diagnosed with vitiligo in the mid-1980s, he started to learn more about the disease. He would often call his dermatologist's nurse and future wife Debbie Rowe to get medical information as well as emotional support.

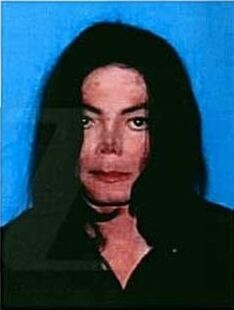
In his 2005 driver's license photo, Jackson didn't wear makeup, marking a rare instance where his vitiligo was clearly visible.

Jackson's physical changes gained widespread media coverage and provoked criticism from the public. Some African-American psychologists argued Jackson was "a lousy role model for black youth": A member of the Association of Black Psychologists, Dennis Chestnut, said Jackson had given "black youth a feeling that they can achieve," but might encourage them to believe they had to be esoteric and idiosyncratic to be successful, while Halford Fairchild, another member of the aforementioned organization, said Jackson and other African-American celebrities would try "to look more like white people in order to get in films and on television." Jackson also was confronted with the reaction of the people around him. Filmmaker John Landis, who directed two music videos for Jackson, said when Jackson showed him his bleached chest, Landis told him the doctor who had done it was a criminal.

However, in 1993, Jackson said in an interview with Oprah Winfrey that "there is no such thing as skin bleaching, I have never seen it, I don't know what it is," adding "I have a skin disorder [vitiligo] that destroys the pigmentation of the skin. It's something that I cannot help, okay? But, when people make up stories that I don't want to be who I am, it hurts me." Jackson suggested that his skin tone began to change "sometime after Thriller," that his condition was hereditary, and admitted to using makeup to even his skin tone. Winfrey's interview with Jackson was watched by an average of 62 million viewers at any given moment. It also started a public discourse on the topic of vitiligo, then a relatively unknown condition.

Jackson publicly said that he was proud to be black. He also wrote a letter to photographer William Pecchi Jr. in 1988 which reads: "Maybe I look at the world through rose colored glasses but I love people all over the world. That is why stories of racism really disturb me. [...] Because in truth I believe ALL men are created equal, I was taught that and will always believe it. I just can't conceive of how a person could hate another because of skin color. I love every race on the planet earth. Prejudice is the child of ignorance. Naked we come into the world and naked we shall go out. And a very good thing too, for it reminds me that I am naked under my shirt, whatever its color."

Shortly following Jackson's death, tubes of Benoquin and hydroquinone were found in Jackson's home. Both creams are commonly used to treat vitiligo; David Sawcer said some patients with vitiligo remove dark areas of skin when most of their skin has become pale. Darkening depigmented skin is also extremely difficult. Depigmentation causes a permanent and extreme sensitivity to the sun. Vitiligo patients are at risk to contract melanoma, and an annual cancer check-up is recommended. Jackson also covered his skin disorder with clothing wearing long sleeves and long pants. In the music video for "Remember the Time", all dancers and actors except for Jackson are lightly dressed following the example set by ancient Egyptians. Jackson usually avoided wearing patterned clothing to avoid attention to the disorder.

Jackson's autopsy confirmed that he had vitiligo. His skin was found to have reduced (though not absent) melanocytes, the cells active in skin pigmentation. Vitiligo occurs in three different patterns. Segmental depigmentation means only one side of the body is affected, whereas generalized depigmentation means many parts of the body are affected. Jackson's autopsy report states a "focal depigmentation of the skin" (i.e., the depigmentation occurs on one or a few areas of the body). In Jackson's case, there were five affected areas. Jackson's autopsy did not confirm or refute the claim that he had lupus.

== Cosmetic procedures ==
=== Nose surgeries ===
Media reports state Jackson had extensive surgery on his nose. Jackson denied those reports in his 1988 autobiography Moonwalk, saying he had only had two rhinoplasties, the first occurring in 1979 after a stage accident where he broke his nose. Shortly after Jackson's death, Klein stated that he had rebuilt Jackson's nose because its cartilage had totally collapsed and that he had been 'exquisitely sensitive to pain'. Medical records show that Klein administered Jackson Demerol during procedures. Jackson had told Patrick Treacy that he had had a facial hypersensitivity caused by a botched cosmetic surgery. Jackson's second wife, Debbie Rowe, who had met Jackson while she had been working for Klein, said she had been designated to help him through procedures.

In 2017, British broadcaster Sky canceled the airing of an episode of Urban Myths which cast Joseph Fiennes to portray Jackson with heavy white makeup and a constructed nose. The cancellation came after Jackson's family had expressed concerns in public.

=== Facial structure ===
Surgeons speculated he also had a forehead lift, cheekbone surgery and altered his lips. Jackson variously denied the reports of extensive cosmetic surgery, at times claiming to have only ever had surgery on his nose, while at other times saying that he also had a cleft created in his chin. Jackson attributed the changes in the structure of his face to puberty and weight loss from his strict vegetarian diet. He also denied allegations that he had altered his eyes. In the unedited version of the documentary Living with Michael Jackson, Jackson was asked about his cheeks; he answered: "These cheekbones? No. My father has the same thing. We have Indian blood."

== Physical health ==
=== Burns and scalp surgery ===
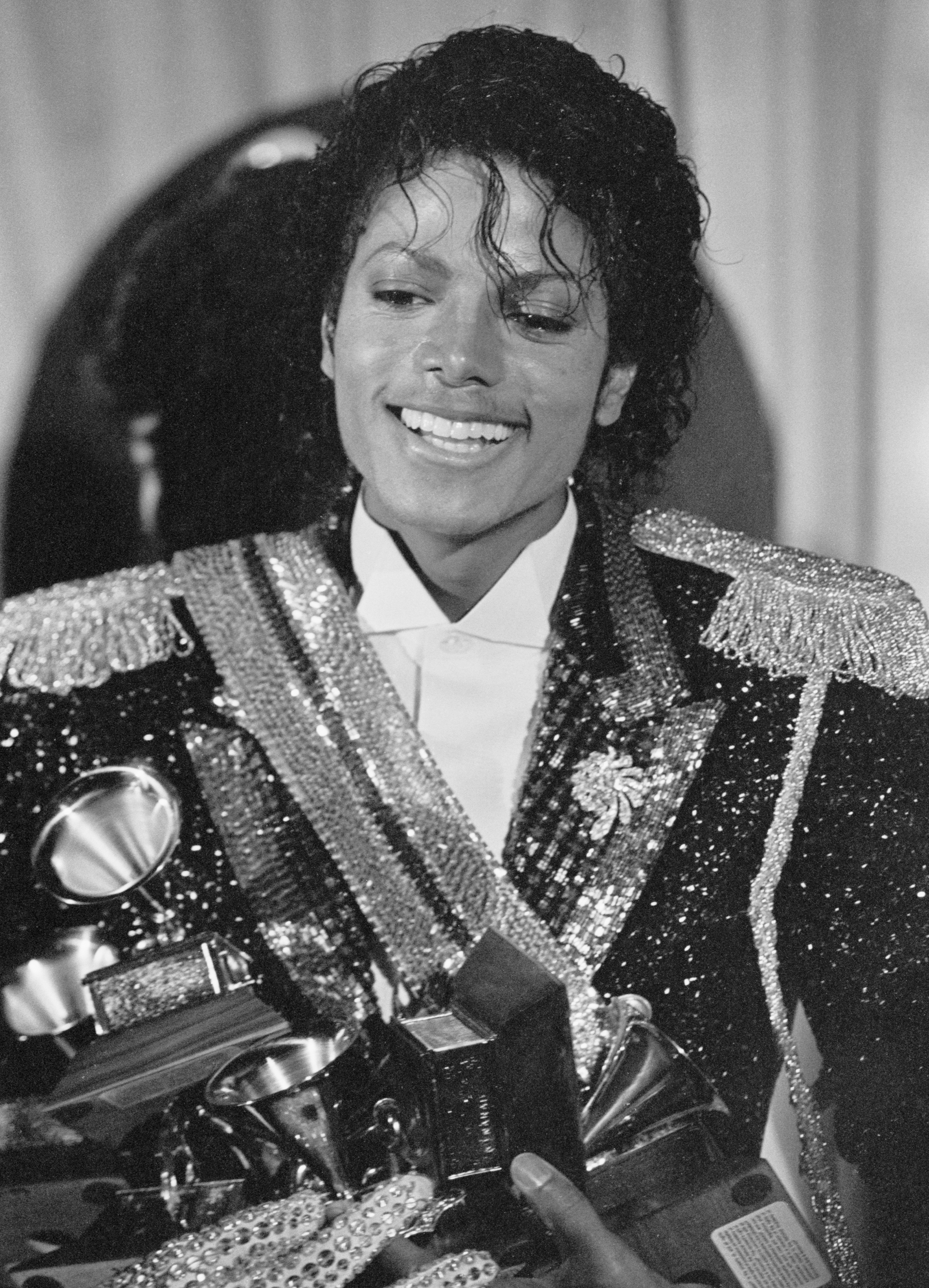
Jackson at the 26th Grammy Awards, nearly a month after his hair caught fire.

On January 27, 1984, Jackson's hair caught fire during the recording of a Pepsi television commercial. Jackson stated that the fire had been caused by sparks of magnesium flash bombs exploding only two feet away from either side of his head, in breach of safety regulations. Later that day, the hospital announced that Jackson was in a stable condition and was doing well. A spokesman said that he had suffered second-degree burns on his skull and would be transferred to the Brotman Medical Center's special burn unit.

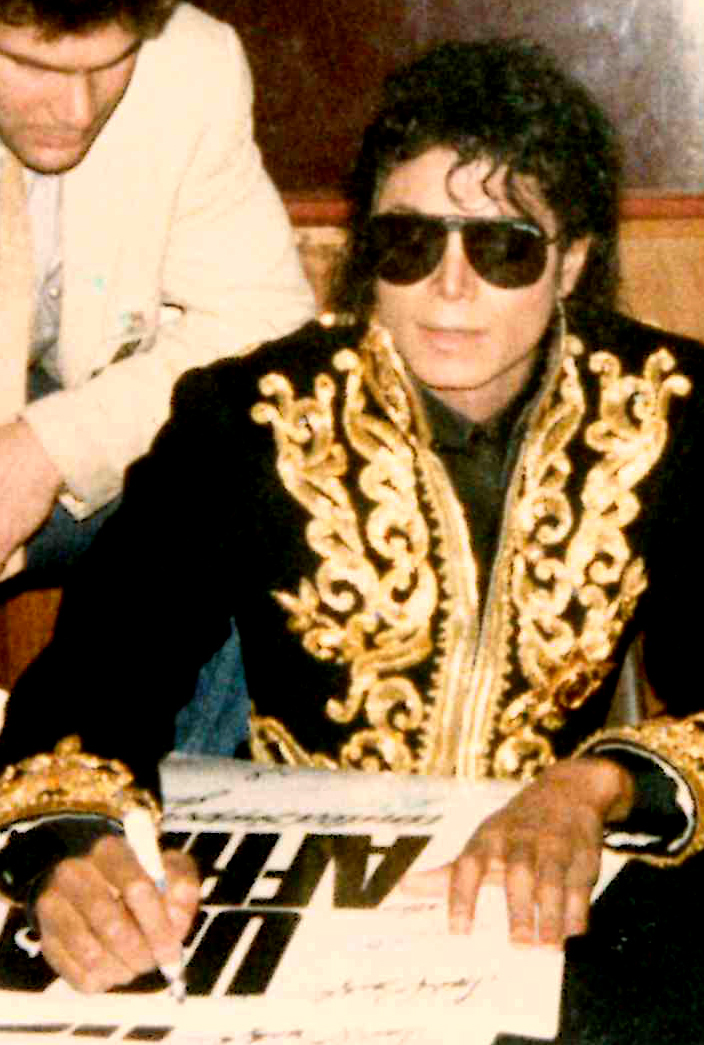
Jackson in 1985

Jackson said that he had suffered third-degree burns on the back of his head, which had gone almost through his skull, and that they had caused multiple health problems. Over a period of several years, balloon implants had been inserted to stretch the affected area and cut out the scars in order to restore his hair. In November 1993, Jackson announced the cancellation of the remaining shows of the Dangerous World Tour due to a dependence on painkillers, which had been prescribed after a recent constructive scalp surgery. The efforts to restore his hair failed; Jackson thereafter resolved to wear wigs.

=== Dehydration ===
In August 1993, two shows of Jackson's Dangerous World Tour in Thailand had to be canceled due to dehydration. On August 27, 1993, Jackson "returned to the concert stage". A few days later, Jackson complained of nausea and a severe headache. His physician, David Forecast, stated that Jackson had had a migraine a few weeks prior and that the dehydration might have intensified it. Jackson underwent an MRI scan, which was entirely normal.

A specialist confirmed Forecast's diagnosis of "late-onset migraine," and medication was prescribed for Jackson. Jackson consumed a lot of water, preventing dehydration and any issues with his voice. In late 1995, Jackson was hospitalized after collapsing during rehearsals for a televised performance. Medics cited irregular heartbeats, gastro-intestinal inflammation, dehydration, and kidney and liver irregularities.

In June 2003, Jackson had been briefly hospitalized before a deposition in a copyright matter. A physician had stated Jackson was weak, dizzy and dehydrated. He had been treated with intravenous fluids and a tranquilizer. Jackson's lawyer stated that Jackson "sometimes became nervous and failed to eat when faced with depositions". An emergency physician and Jackson's personal physician had provided affidavits regarding Jackson's health. The deposition was postponed.

=== Orthopedic problems ===
In June 1990, Jackson was admitted to a hospital in Santa Monica due to chest pain. According to Mark Zatzkis, "laboratory and X-ray tests of Jackson's heart and lungs revealed no abnormalities"; the pains "were caused by bruised ribs suffered during a vigorous dance practice". The first concert in Santiago de Chile, scheduled for October 21, 1993, was canceled due to lumbar issues; two days later, Jackson performed at Estadio Nacional. Another concert in Lima, Peru, scheduled for October 26, 1993, was canceled due to a torn muscle suffered during a show in Brazil.

Jackson suffered a back injury in June 1999 after one of the stages collapsed during a concert in Munich, Germany. On March 10, 2005, Jackson appeared late in court after having received treatment in a hospital due to a back problem. The judge ordered him to appear in court under the penalty of arrest and forfeiture of his bail. Jackson appeared in court wearing a T-shirt, a blazer, pajama bottoms and slippers.

On March 21, Jackson arrived in court accompanied by a doctor. It is believed that he suffered from back problems again. A conversation between the judge and the lawyers regarding the matter was sealed. During the trial, Jackson occasionally needed help to get to his seat. On June 5, 2005, Jackson was taken to the emergency room at the Santa Ynez Valley Cottage Hospital to seek treatment for back pain. Jackson's spokeswoman, Raymone Bain, said "stress contributed to the back problem".

=== Viral infections and voice issues ===
On March 12, 1988, Jackson canceled a show in St. Louis, Missouri, which was rescheduled to March 14; on March 13, Jackson performed in St. Louis with a common cold. The cold progressed to laryngitis; the show on March 14 was also canceled. Three shows in Tacoma, scheduled from October 31 to November 2, 1988, had to be canceled on his physician's advice because Jackson had the flu. Two shows in Los Angeles were canceled due to swollen vocal cords; three shows in Los Angeles scheduled for November 20, 21 and 22 were also canceled; these five concerts were rescheduled for January 1989.

In August 1992, a concert in London, England had to be postponed due to a viral infection. Four days later, Jackson performed in Cardiff, Wales. In September 1992, a concert in Gelsenkirchen, Germany was canceled because Jackson was ill with the flu. In October 1992, a concert in Istanbul and another in Izmir, Turkey had to be canceled due to loss of voice caused by a cold. His private doctor attended to Jackson in Istanbul. According to organizers, Jackson's "vocal cords were irritated". These concerts were supposed to be the last three shows of the tour's European leg. Jackson was seen by a throat specialist in London and was advised to seek further treatment in Los Angeles.

People around Jackson took precautions to keep him healthy. One of the measures was that Jackson wore a surgical mask during air travel. Later he transformed it into a fashion accessory wearing a silk mask in black with jewel tones. On February 15, 2005, Jackson was admitted to the Marian Medical Center in Santa Maria with "flu-like symptoms". According to Chuck Merrill, Jackson was in stable condition and would recover within a few days. Jackson left the hospital on February 16, 2005. Todd Bailey said Jackson "continued to need care for some persistent viral symptoms, but otherwise he was in good spirits". One week later, the jury selection for the child sexual abuse trial resumed in Jackson's presence.

=== Dental problems ===
In 1993, several concerts in Mexico City were canceled due to dental issues. Two abscessed molars were extracted.

=== Ambulance transport and hospitalization ===
In 1992, an ambulance took Jackson back to his hotel after the show in Lausanne, Switzerland; another show in Basel was also canceled. In 1999, Jackson was taken to a hospital with abrasions and bruises after a bridge, on which Jackson was standing during a charity concert in Munich, Germany, had been lowered too quickly.

== Insomnia ==
Allan Metzger stated in his testimony for Murray's trial that Jackson began having recurring insomnia because each show often left him adrenalized and unable to sleep for days. Metzger would prescribe sleep medication for Jackson that helped him while he was working on We Are the World. However, during the 1996 HIStory World Tour, his insomnia became worse and his prescriptions were increased by different physicians.

In his final months, Jackson's insomnia was still prevalent and he was dissatisfied with his lack of sleep. Nurse Lee stated she spent one night in Jackson's residence to monitor his nighttime routine. Jackson went to bed with classical music playing on a sound system and Donald Duck cartoons playing on a computer. That night Jackson slept only for three hours. He told Lee: "All I want is to be able to sleep. I want to be able to sleep eight hours. I know I'll feel better the next day." Lee stated that Jackson told her that he believed propofol would help him, but did not say the name of the doctor that would give it to him.

Klein recalled Jackson could not sleep one night when he was on tour in Hawaii. Finally, Klein and his office staff slept in Jackson's room. One of his lawyers said Jackson suffered from sleeplessness when he was under pressure: "He gets upset, he doesn't drink, he doesn't eat, he can't sleep. It gets to the point where he just can't stand it. He is exhausted with this kind of thing."

== Drug use ==
=== Painkillers ===
In November 1993, Jackson announced that he was dependent on painkillers; he said he had recently undergone a scalp surgery, and the painkillers had been prescribed. In a taped statement, Jackson said: "The pressure resulting from these false allegations, coupled with the incredible energy necessary for me to perform, caused so much distress that it left me physically and emotionally exhausted. I became increasingly more dependent on the painkillers." His lawyers said Jackson would be treated for dependency overseas for one and a half months to two months. In December 1993, Jackson returned to the United States.

Jackson's dependency was questioned by the lawyer who represented the boy accusing Jackson of sexual abuse. In November 1993, two lawyers, who had seen Jackson a few days before he had canceled his tour, described their impressions in a sworn declaration. A plaintiff's lawyer in a copyright matter stated he had been "warned that the entertainer was taking painkillers because of recent oral surgery" before questioning him. The lawyer stated he had seen "no obvious effects of drug abuse".

One of Jackson's lawyers stated she had seen him the day before and had concluded he had been 'unfit to give testimony' but 'seemed to be doing much better' the next day when he had given the deposition. Jackson's lawyer said these swings had continued over the next few days. She said she had been "deeply concerned" about Jackson's health.

=== Propofol ===
Cherilyn Lee, a nurse who provided nutritional counseling to Jackson, said that on April 12, 2009, he had asked her for unspecified "products for sleep". On April 19, 2009, he told her the only medicine that would help was propofol. Lee refused, telling him, "Michael, the only problem with you taking this medication ... is you're going to take it and you're not going to wake up."

Jackson dismissed the warning, telling her he had been given the drug before and that he had been told that it was safe. After Jackson's death, Lee said in an interview: "He wasn't looking to get high or feel good and sedated from drugs. This was a person who was not on drugs. This was a person who was seeking help, desperately, to get some sleep, to get some rest."

Patrick Treacy, a cosmetic surgeon who had treated Jackson while he had been living in Ireland in 2006, stated that he had never seen any drugs in the house and had never been asked for narcotics. Jackson had always insisted on the presence of an anesthetist when propofol had been administered.

== Mental health ==
=== Appearance ===
In his interview in 1993, Jackson talked about the impact the speculations about his skin color had on him. "It is something I cannot help," said Jackson. "When people make up stories that I don't want to be who I am, it hurts me. It's a problem for me. I can't control it. But what about all the millions of people who sit in the sun to become darker, to become other than what they are. Nobody says nothing about that." Jackson publicly said that he was proud to be black. Jackson's paternity of his three children is questioned in public due to their light skin color. Jackson's cosmetic surgeries are also regarded as an attempt to look white. Another theory says Jackson did not want to look like his father. People close to Jackson say he did not want to remove himself from the race.

=== Eccentric lifestyle ===
In September 1986, the National Enquirer reported that Jackson slept in an oxygen chamber in order to prolong his life. Later editor Nick Maier declared that the story was not true. He said a Polaroid of Jackson lying in the chamber was provided by Jackson's press representative. Maier added: "Many celebrities try to create a buzz around themselves. And Michael Jackson did exactly that. In the end, that backfired..." Jackson used his eccentric image to cover his skin condition before speaking about it in public.

=== Depression ===
Jackson's daughter stated her father had depression and had been prescribed antidepressants. Jackson stated he used to cry from loneliness as a child starting at the age of eight or nine. Jackson said his acne had a bad effect on his personality and depressed him. He had not looked at people when he had been talking and had not wanted to go out, but stated he had learned to feel better about himself and things had changed.

Jackson stated in his biography he had one of the most difficult periods in his life when he was making Off the Wall. He felt isolated having only very few close friends. He used to walk through his neighborhood hoping to meet somebody he could talk to and who might become a friend. "Success definitely brings on loneliness", he added. "I've learned to cope better with these things and now I don't get nearly as depressed as I used to".

=== Childhood ===
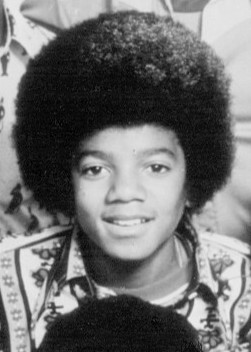
Jackson as a teenager in 1974

In his memoir, Jackson described the relationship with his father Joe as "turbulent". He stated he would not know his father Joe and had never been able "to have a real closeness with him". He said Joe found it hard to relate to his children beyond family business. He stated that he and his siblings had been physically abused by his father with a belt or a switch. Jackson said he had fought back and had hidden himself under tables.

In his 1993 interview with Oprah Winfrey, Jackson said there had been times when he had been so scared of his father that he would get sick and start to regurgitate when Joe had come to see him. In 2003, his father admitted having whipped Jackson with a switch and a belt. In a speech held at Oxford University in March 2001, Jackson said that his father had never shown him love. He said he had forgiven his father and encouraged parents to spend more time with their children. Jackson said that he would not have been so successful if Joe had not been as strong. He said he was thankful that his father had not tried to take his children's money.

Jackson also said he missed a lot of his childhood. He said it was hard to watch other children playing while he was working. Jackson said that he loved to perform but admitted there had been times when he had not wanted to. In his mid 30s, Jackson said he was compensating for his lost childhood. Later, he released a song, "Childhood", about it.

=== Child sexual abuse allegations ===
In November 1993, Jackson's then lawyer Bertram Fields announced that his client would be treated for painkillers outside the U.S. He declined that Jackson would not come back because of the child molestation allegations. He said: "He's not in a position to cooperate with his attorneys now preparing his defense. He was barely able to function on an intellectual level."

Fields was criticized by others in Jackson's team for portraying Jackson as incompetent. Later he stated: "It was important to tell the truth. [The boy's lawyer] and the press took the position that Michael was trying to hide and that it was all a scam. But it wasn't." The lawyer resigned a few days later. The week before, Jackson had given two depositions in a copyright issue. One of the plaintiffs' lawyers said: "[Jackson] didn't look tired at all. It was not obvious to me he was suffering addiction or we wouldn't use the testimony".

== Death ==
=== Medical examination in February 2009 ===
Due to an inquiry about a cancelation insurance for the upcoming tour, insurance carriers demanded a medical exam by a doctor they trusted. In February 2009, Jackson had an examination performed by David Slavit of New York. Later, the broker told an AEG senior vice president Jackson had only slight hay fever and had passed the exam "with flying colors". A second medical exam was supposed to take place on July 6, 2009.

=== Health problems in June 2009 ===
After Jackson's death, nurse Lee stated that she had received a frantic call on June 21, 2009, from an aide on Jackson's staff. The aide had reported that Jackson had been feeling ill. Lee reported overhearing Jackson complain that one side of his body was hot, the other side cold. She had believed that somebody had given him something that had affected his central nervous system. She had advised the aide to take him to the hospital.

=== June 25, 2009 ===
The autopsy report states that Jackson called his primary physician, cardiologist Conrad Murray, at around 1 am on June 25, 2009, and complained of being dehydrated and being unable to sleep. Murray went to Jackson's residence and administered medical care. The details and extent of the medical care were unknown when the autopsy report was written. Jackson slept for several hours while Murray was at his bedside. He found Jackson not breathing at approximately 12 pm. He pulled him onto the bedroom floor and began CPR.

911 was called, and paramedics arrived at 12:26 pm. The paramedics continued CPR and ACLS protocol, including two rounds of epinephrine and atropine. Jackson was intubated, and the CPR efforts continued. Jackson remained unresponsive; his pupils were fixed and dilated. Jackson was transported to UCLA Medical Center under Murray's advisement, who gave all medical orders throughout the transport. Upon arrival, Jackson was asystolic. Central lines and an intra-aortic balloon pump were placed, but Jackson remained without vital signs. Death was pronounced at 2:26 pm.

=== Death investigation ===
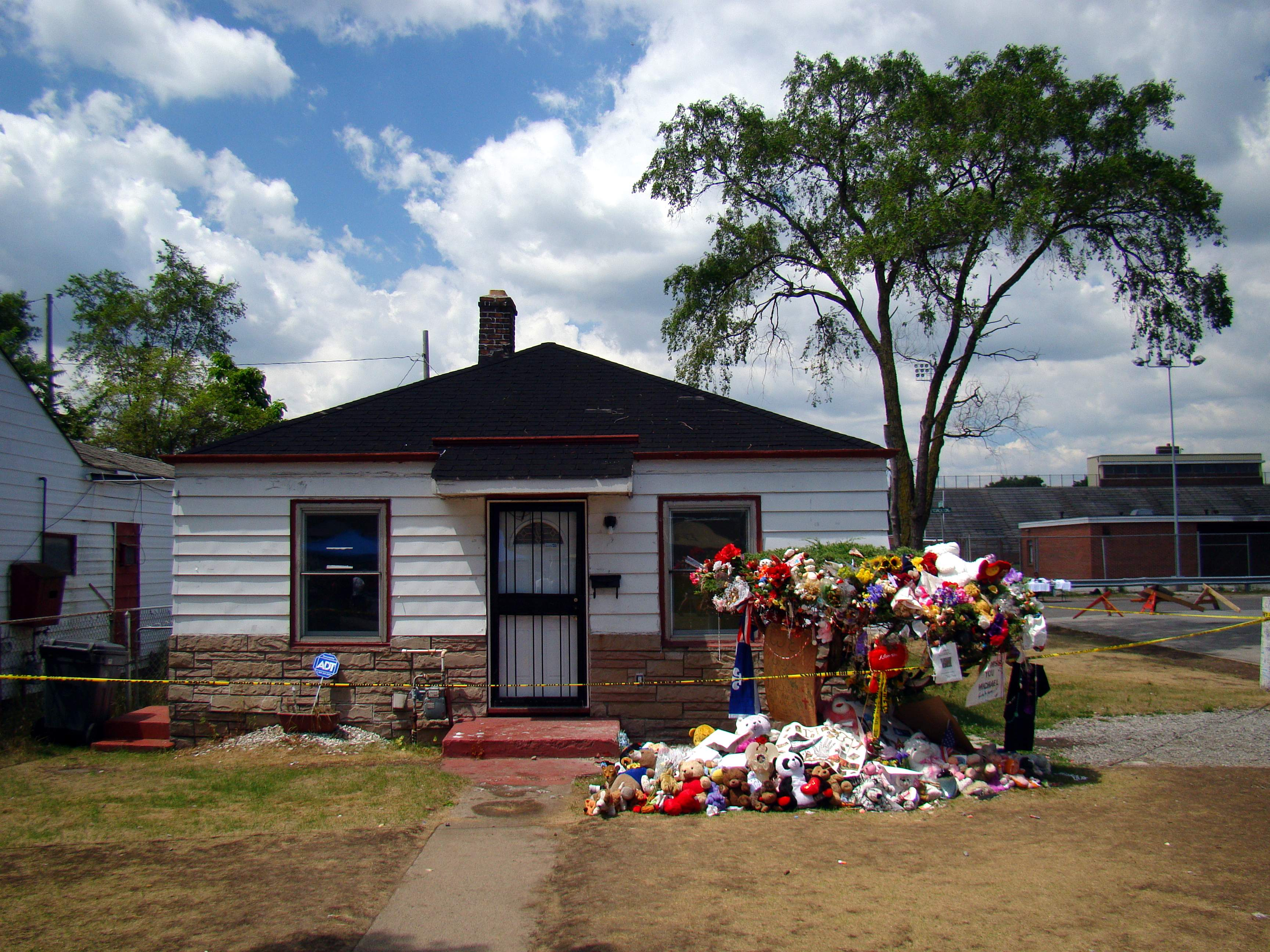
Jackson's childhood home in July 2009

In the afternoon of June 25, 2009, Jackson's death was reported as an accidental versus natural death case to the Los Angeles County Department of Coroner by the LAPD. The coroner completed a body examination at the hospital in the late afternoon. Later that day, the Los Angeles Sheriff's Department-Air Bureau transported Jackson's body to the Coroner's Forensic Science Center.

Two days after Jackson died, Murray told the police that he had arrived at Jackson's residence at 12:50 a.m. on June 25. He said doses of lorazepam and midazolam had not put Jackson to sleep throughout the night and so he had given him 25 milligrams of propofol at around 10:40 a.m. He said the propofol had been diluted with lidocaine.

Murray said he had administered the drug at Jackson's request, after which Jackson fell asleep. Murray stated that at some point, he had gone to the bathroom, and when he returned, he had found Jackson not breathing and had started CPR. Murray said he had given Jackson propofol "virtually every day" for a little more than two months. He said Jackson had told him it would be the only thing that would help him sleep and that he had received it before.

Murray stated he had feared Jackson had been becoming addicted. Three days before Jackson's death, he had begun to reduce the use of propofol, and with Jackson's reluctant cooperation, he had relied more on lorazepam and midazolam. According to Murray, Jackson had not needed propofol on the night of June 23, but the next night, lorazepam and midazolam had not helped Jackson sleep.

On June 29, the coroner's office issued a subpoena requesting all of Jackson's medical records. Murray only handed over a few documents referring to sporadic medical care he had provided since 2006, but no records referring to treatments in Jackson's final months. A few days later, the DEA confirmed they had joined the investigations into Jackson's death. A spokesperson said the agency would "routinely offer assistance to any agency regarding the Federal Controlled Substance act".

Following Jackson's death, a police warrant issued against his attending physician, Conrad Murray, said that Jackson's many doctors had used nineteen distinct aliases while prescribing medications for Jackson. Police found a CD mentioning the "Omar Arnold" alias when they raided the Las Vegas, Nevada, home and office of Conrad Murray, Jackson's personal physician. Use of pseudonyms by celebrities' doctors is common practice for maintaining the confidentiality of patients' medical history.

=== Autopsy report ===
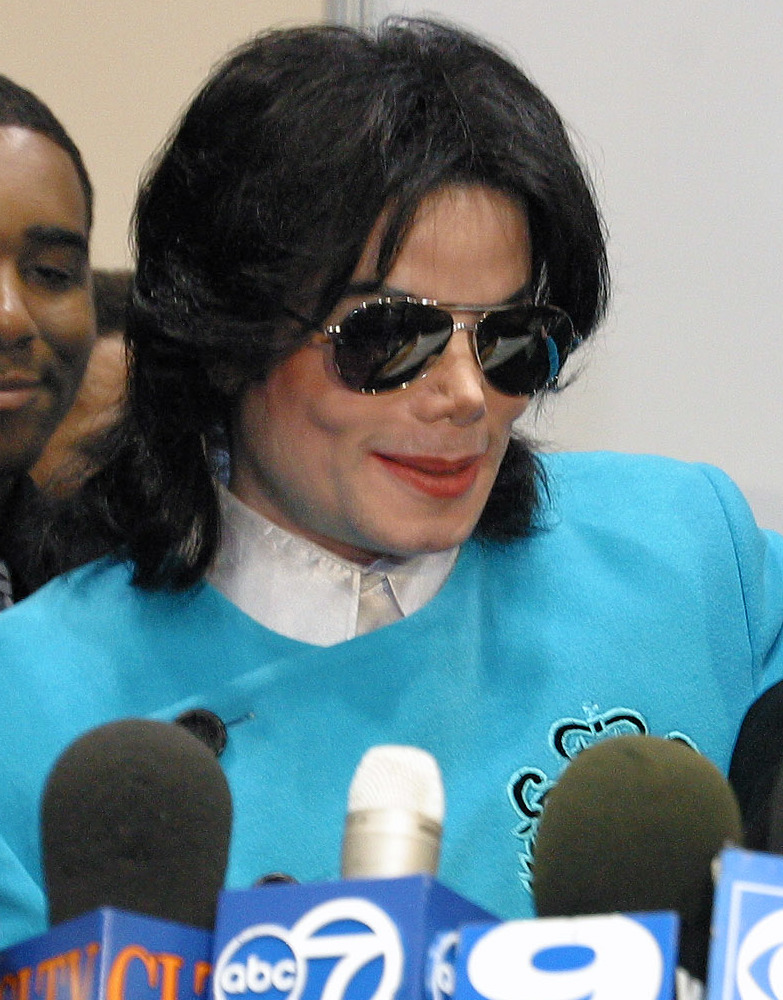
Jackson in 2003

Jackson's death was caused by an acute propofol intoxication with a benzodiazepine effect being a contributory factor in the death. The coroner determined Jackson's death a homicide based on the following reasons: "Circumstances indicate that propofol and the benzodiazepines were administered by another. The propofol was administered in a non-hospital setting without any appropriate medical indication. The standard of care for administering propofol was not met [...]. Recommended equipment for patient monitoring, precision dosing, and resuscitation was not present. The circumstances do not support self-administration of propofol".

Jackson's autopsy report states one scar beside each of his nostrils, one scar behind each of his ears, plus cosmetic tattoos on his eyebrows, around his eyes and lips. It also states a "dark discoloration resembling a tattoo on the anterior half of the scalp". Jackson was uncircumcised. The report confirmed that he had vitiligo and states a "focal depigmentation of the skin" (i.e., the depigmentation occurs on one or a few areas of the body).

In Jackson's case, there were five affected areas. Two areas of his neck were found to have reduced (though not absent) melanocytes, the cells active in skin pigmentation. He had puncture wounds on his right neck, both arms, (Note: "Punctured arms" presumably describes hypodermic needle wounds, while making no effort to distinguish phlebotomy from injection from intravenous therapy, all of which involve hypodermic needles; nor does it distinguish whether hypodermic use was medical or non-medical, medically supervised or unsupervised.) both ankles and his right shoulder. Jackson had degenerative osteoarthritis of the lower lumbar spine facet joints and the distal interphalangeal joints of the right index and long fingers as well as the left little finger. He also had a chronic interstitial pneumonitis.

=== Second autopsy ===
Jackson's family sought a second autopsy, which was performed by a private pathologist on June 27, 2009. Reverend Jesse Jackson (no relation) said the family had a lot of questions. Former medical examiners said it is not unusual for families to ask for a second autopsy because they either distrust officials or want a second opinion. A New York pathologist said the family would have the results within one or two weeks. It was estimated that the official toxicology results for Jackson could take four to six weeks.

=== Trial of Conrad Murray ===
In 2011, Murray was tried for involuntary manslaughter. Prosecutors said [Murray]... "repeatedly acted with gross negligence, repeatedly denied appropriate care to his patient". Records showed that Murray had spent nearly 90 minutes on the phone in the hours before Jackson died, making or receiving 11 phone calls. Murray's attorneys argued that Jackson administered the fatal dose himself when the defendant was not in the bedroom. Christopher Rogers said in his testimony: "The theory that seems less reasonable to me is that Mr. Jackson woke up, and although he was under the influence of sedative medications, managed to give himself another dose."

Records showed that 911 had been called at 12:21 p.m. Paramedic Richard Sennef testified that Murray did not mention propofol when he asked him about Jackson's medications. According to Sennef, Murray said: "No he's not taking anything. I just gave him a little bit of Lorazepam to help him sleep." Murray told Sennef he had treated Jackson for dehydration and exhaustion. Paramedic Martin Blunt testified he saw three open vials of lidocaine on the floor of Jackson's bedroom when he and his colleague arrived. He said that when his colleague had asked Murray what drugs Jackson had been given, Murray did not mention lidocaine. Blunt said when they prepared to transport Jackson to the hospital, he saw Murray putting three bottles into a black bag.

Jackson had arrived at the emergency room of UCLA Medical Center at 1:13 p.m. Emergency doctor Richelle Cooper testified she first called death at 12:57 p.m. based on the information provided by the paramedics at Jackson's residence. She said that Jackson had been "clinically dead" when he had arrived Cooper said Murray had told her Jackson had regularly taken Valium and Flomax and that he had given Jackson 2 mg of lorazepam via IV. That dose had been followed by another dose. After the second dose, Jackson went into arrest.

Murray asked doctors "not to give up easily." Murray "looked devastated" and "sounded desperate". Thao Nguyen said she and her attending could not find a pulse. Murray said he had detected a pulse, and the efforts continued. It was agreed if another attempt and resuscitation efforts with a balloon pump failed, then Jackson would be pronounced dead. After that final procedure, Jackson was pronounced dead. Nguyen said when she asked Murray if Jackson had taken any other sedatives or narcotics, "his reply was negative". Murray had also been unable to tell Nguyen when Jackson had stopped breathing. Cooper said: "Michael Jackson had died long before he became my patient. It is unlikely with that information [about the propofol] I could have done something that would have changed the outcome." Murray was sentenced to serve four years in prison.

The medical examiner, Rogers, testified in court that Jackson had been 5 ft 9 in (1.75 m) and had weighed 136 lb (62 kg), which would be within a normal weight range, although he had been thin. He also said that, in his opinion, Jackson "was healthier than the average person of his age" and that the arteries around Jackson's heart were free of fat and cholesterol, which is unusual for a 50-year-old individual. Toxicologist Dan Anderson testified that Demerol was not detected in Jackson's system. However, significant amounts of propofol, lidocaine, and lorazepam were present. According to Nader Kamangar, a sleep disorder specialist at UCLA, drugs such as Demerol can cause insomnia. In the case of Jackson, insomnia could have been caused by "anxiety for performing" as well.

==== Demerol injections ====
Shortly after Jackson's death, speculation about his use of Demerol surfaced. Murray's legal team argued that Demerol had caused Jackson's insomnia and therefore he had needed propofol to get to sleep. Medical records showed that Demerol had been administered to Jackson by his dermatologist. An expert for the defense testified that insomnia and anxiety are side effects of Demerol withdrawal. According to medical records, Klein had given Jackson Botox and Restylane to treat wrinkles and excessive perspiration. The expert said the Demerol shots were 'stiff doses' that had not been needed for skin treatment injections.

Records presented by the defense showed that Jackson had visited Klein's clinic at least 24 times between March 12 and June 22, 2009, receiving a total amount of 6,500 mg of Demerol during those visits. Murray said he had not known about the Demerol shots. He said Jackson told him his insomnia was caused by "his creative mind always racing". The expert testified he believed there was evidence that Jackson had been dependent on Demerol, "possibly" addicted. During cross-examination, he said he probably would not diagnose Jackson as being addicted to Demerol based strictly on the medical records. The witness also said he was not a board-certified addiction specialist. Demerol had not been found in Jackson's body at the autopsy.

The theory established by the defense caused a discussion among experts about whether propofol should be used to treat withdrawal symptoms.

=== Aftermath ===
Jackson's death and the trial against Murray started a public discussion about the use and dangers of propofol. Media reports stated that the American Association of Nurse Anesthetists had warned hospitals three days prior to Jackson's death to restrict access to propofol because some medical professionals had become addicted to the drug. Propofol became known as the 'Michael Jackson Drug' among patients, and many of them had reservations about it after Jackson's death. These concerns decreased.

Following Jackson's death and increasing numbers of fatalities linked to the drug, the DEA stated they would consider labelling propofol a controlled substance. In 2010 the agency recommended adding propofol to the List of Schedule IV drugs but it was not successful. In 2011, North Dakota classified propofol as a controlled substance. North Dakota was joined by Alabama in 2012 and Georgia in 2016. Also in 2011, South Korea listed propofol as a psychotropic drug, making its use outside stipulated treatments illegal.

In 2012, Missouri prison officials announced plans to use propofol for capital punishment. Pharmaceutical companies refused to provide propofol for such purposes.
