= California State Route 246 =

Highway in California

State Route 246
- SR 246 highlighted in red

Route information
- Maintained by Caltrans
- Length: 26 mi (42 km)
- Restrictions: No trucks over 3 short tons (2.7 t) through Lompoc

Major junctions
- West end: Ocean Avenue at the western city limits of Lompoc
- SR 1 in Lompoc; US 101 in Buellton
- East end: SR 154 in Santa Ynez

Location
- Country: United States
- State: California
- Counties: Santa Barbara

Highway system
- State highways in California; Interstate; US; State; Scenic; History; Pre‑1964; Unconstructed; Deleted; Freeways
← SR 245	→ SR 247

State Route 246 (SR 246) is a state highway in the U.S. state of California that runs from Lompoc east to Solvang and Santa Ynez, cutting through the Santa Ynez Valley and the Santa Barbara Wine Country. Its western terminus is at the western city limits of Lompoc, and its eastern terminus is at State Route 154 near Santa Ynez.

== Route description ==
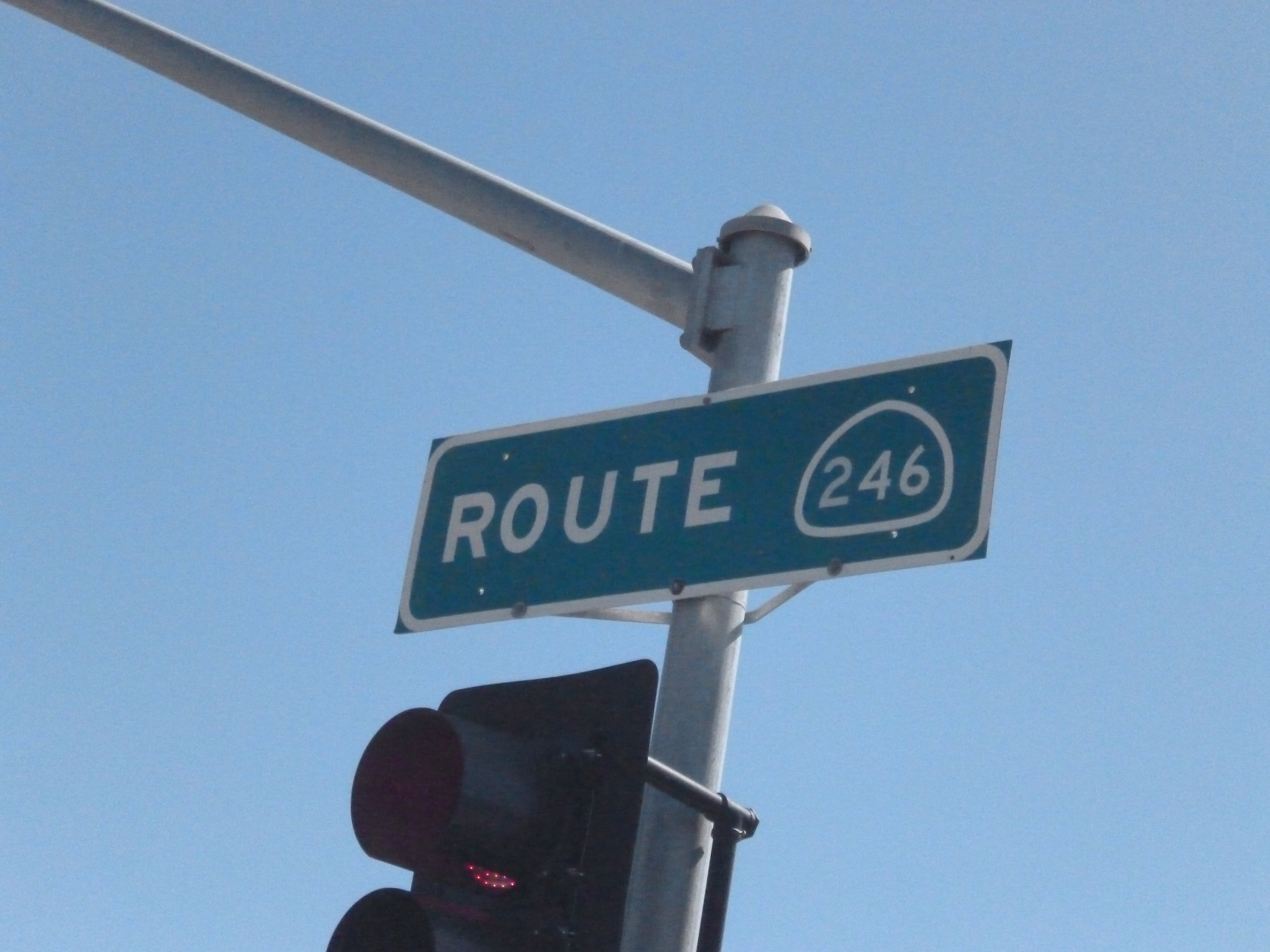
Sign on California Route 246

Route 246 is defined in section 546 of the California Streets and Highways Code. The definition omits the concurrency with Route 1 instead of duplicating that segment in the other route's definition in the code:

Route 246 is from:
(a) Current west city limits of the City of Lompoc to Route 1.
(b) Route 1 to Route 154 near Santa Ynez.

Most of SR 246 is two lanes wide, with the exception of the route through the cities of Lompoc and Buellton. This is the primary route from U.S. Route 101 to Solvang. It follows the Santa Ynez River for most of its length. The portion of the route through Solvang runs along Mission Drive, while the segment through Lompoc—including the portion where it is co-signed with State Route 1—runs along Ocean Avenue.

SR 246 begins at the western city limits of Lompoc, where it runs along Ocean Avenue to H Street, joining SR 1. The SR 246/SR 1 concurrency continues east along Ocean Avenue to the eastern edge of the city. SR 246 then splits from SR 1 and heads northeast out of Lompoc along a relatively flat two-lane road until reaching Buellton, where it widens upon its intersection with US 101. It narrows once again to two lanes through Solvang and Santa Ynez before reaching its eastern terminus at the junction with State Route 154.

SR 246 passes two of Santa Barbara County's Spanish-era missions, La Purísima Concepción near Lompoc, and Santa Inés in Solvang.

Part of SR 246 in Lompoc is in the National Highway System, a network of highways that are considered essential to the country's economy, defense, and mobility by the Federal Highway Administration.

== History ==
In 1933, this was designated as a state highway, and was numbered as Route 149 in 1935. In 1963, it was part of State Route 154. In the 1964 state highway renumbering, it was renumbered to SR 246. SR 246 used to run all the way west to Surf, but this segment along Ocean Avenue to the western city limits of Lompoc was relinquished to local control in 1984.

== Major intersections ==
Except where prefixed with a letter, postmiles were measured on the road as it was in 1964, based on the alignment that existed at the time, and do not necessarily reflect current mileage. Postmile prefixes include: R reflecting a realignment in the route since then, M indicating a second realignment, L referring to an overlap due to a correction or change, and T indicating postmiles classified as temporary. Segments that remain unconstructed or have been relinquished to local control may be omitted. The entire route is in Santa Barbara County.

Location	Postmile	Destinations	Notes
Lompoc	8.30	Ocean Avenue – NASA/Vandenberg SFB South Gate, Surf	Continuation beyond west end of SR 246 at the Lompoc west city limit
Lompoc	9.55 19.25 (Note: Indicates that the postmile represents the distance along SR 1 rather than SR 246.)	SR 1 north (H Street) – Vandenberg SFB, Guadalupe, Orcutt, Santa Maria	West end of SR 1 overlap
Lompoc	19.53	7th Street	Serves Lompoc Valley Medical Center
Lompoc	20.57 9.56	SR 1 south / 12th Street – Santa Barbara	East end of SR 1 overlap
Buellton	26.29	US 101	Interchange; US 101 exit 140A
Solvang	30.28	Alamo Pintado Road – Ballard, Los Olivos	Serves Santa Ynez Valley Cottage Hospital
	R34.60	SR 154 – Los Olivos, Cachuma Lake, Santa Barbara	Roundabout; east end of SR 246
	R34.60	Armour Ranch Road	Continuation beyond SR 154
1.000 mi = 1.609 km; 1.000 km = 0.621 mi: Concurrency terminus
