= Benedict Nordentoft =

Danish educator and cleric

Grand View College, Des Moines (c. 1900) where Nordentoft was president from 1903 to 1910

Benedict Nordentoft (17 January 1873 – 12 December 1942) was a Danish educator and cleric, principally remembered for the years he spent in Solvang, California, where he and his colleagues established a Danish community with a Lutheran church and a folk high school.

== Early life and education ==
Benedict Nordentoft was born in the rectory at Brabrand, a town just west of Aarhus, Denmark, on 17 January 1873. He was the 7th of the 13 gifted children raised by Pastor Peter Nordentoft and Vincentia Christiane Michelsen. In the footsteps of the famous theologian and philosopher N. F. S. Grundtvig, from the age of 11 he attended the Aarhus Cathedral School before studying theology at Copenhagen University. Later he would comment: "Although I was often moved by the sermons of Grundtvigian priests and although many of my student friends were Grundtvigians, I have never been able to accept Grundtvig's excessively dogmatic views." After graduating with honours in 1898, he became a substitute teacher at Herlufsholm School before becóming a tutor for Count Brockenhuus-Schack's eldest son in Ringsted in 1899.

Though pleased with his position, he could not resist the urge to go to America where he had been offered a post as a lecturer at Grand View College, a Danish seminary and folk high school in Des Moines, Iowa, believing that America would open up new horizons for him.

== Years in the United States ==
One of his first tasks as a lecturer at Grand View was to coordinate relations between Danish Lutheran churches in Michigan, Ohio, New Jersey, New York, Connecticut, Massachusetts and Maine. In the summer of 1901, he returned to Denmark specifically to be ordained in Aarhus Cathedral. Back in America, he continued his work as a lecturer at Grand View. In 1903, when he was only 30 years old, he became the college president, a post which he held until 1910. That year, as a result of differences with his colleagues at the college who were far more Grundtvigian than he, Nordentoft was pressured to leave.

From 1906, Nordentoft together with Jens M. Gregersen, a pastor from Kimballton, Iowa, and Peder P. Hornsyld, a lecturer at Grand View, had discussed the possibility of creating a new Danish colony with a dedicated Lutheran church and school on the west coast. In 1910, together with other Danish-Americans, they created the Danish-American Colony Company in San Francisco. Later that year, their land agent, Mads J. Frese, found suitable land in the Santa Ynez Valley northwest of Santa Barbara. On 23 January 1911, the contract was signed and Solvang was founded. The Danes had bought almost 9,000 acres of the Rancho San Carlos de Jonata land grant, paying an average of $40 per acre.

Soon after the establishment of Solvang, a school was opened with 21 students on 15 November 1911 with Nordentoft as president.

At the end of 1912 when it became almost impossible to sell any more plots of land, the company's income was vastly reduced. The shareholders persuaded Gregersen to give up his position as Solvang's pastor and travel to Iowa and Nebraska to convince Danish immigrants to buy land in the new colony. He enjoyed considerable success, relieving the colony of any further threats. After Gregersen's departure, Nordentoft became the pastor. Before long, Solvang also had a store, a bank, a lumber yard, a barbershop and a post office with Hornsyld as postmaster. Where there had just been fields, there was now a small town.

=== Solvang's folk high school ===
Nordentoft was not content with the little school established in Solvang. When he was unable to convince his Danish colleagues that a larger educational institution was needed, he bought them out and started to raise funds for a bigger and better school. The following year, in August 1914, a rejsegilde, or topping-out ceremony, was held for the impressive new building which Nordentoft called Atterdag College in memory of Valdemar Atterdag who did much to consolidate the kingdom of Denmark in the 14th century.

What surprised many of those who came to the celebration was the great similarity the building had with Grand View College. Standing on a hilltop with a commanding view of the village, the new college or folk high school was designed to teach Danish-speaking students in their late teens how to lead more meaningful lives with an emphasis on lectures, singing, gymnastics, folk dancing and fellowship. A difficult period followed as World War I put a stop to Danish emigration to America leading to a reduction in the number of young people requiring a school education. It also became difficult to maintain a Danish-speaking school at a time when American nationalism was steadily growing.

On 26 April 1918 when he was 45, Nordentoft married 20-year-old Mary Hansine Christiansen, the daughter of a Danish farmer from Newell, Iowa, and one of his earlier students. By 1921, the family had two children and a third was on the way. Nordentoft, who felt he had achieved his ambitions in America and wished to have his children educated in Denmark, sold the college to the congregation of Solvang's Bethania Church in 1921 for $5,000. He then returned to Denmark with his wife and family.

== Later life ==
Back in Denmark in 1921, he was first a priest in Tranebjerg on Samsø, then in Mariager and in March 1926 he became pastor of St Nicolai Church in Kolding. The family who raised no less than 11 children were always very welcoming to anyone who wished to visit them at the rectory in Hyrdestræde. All the children were given the middle name Atterdag in memory of the college.

Nordentoft not only taught at the high school in Kolding but became a popular public speaker in the area, thanks to his entertaining and humorous delivery. He often spoke affectionately about his years in America and was active on the committee for the Danish-American Mission. In 1941, he was awarded the Order of the Dannebrog for his services to Danish-American relations.

Benedict Nordentoft died in Kolding on 12 December 1942. A few years later, the authorities in Solvang decided to name two streets in his memory: Nordentoft Way and Kolding Avenue.
