= Solvang, California =

City in California, United States

- City
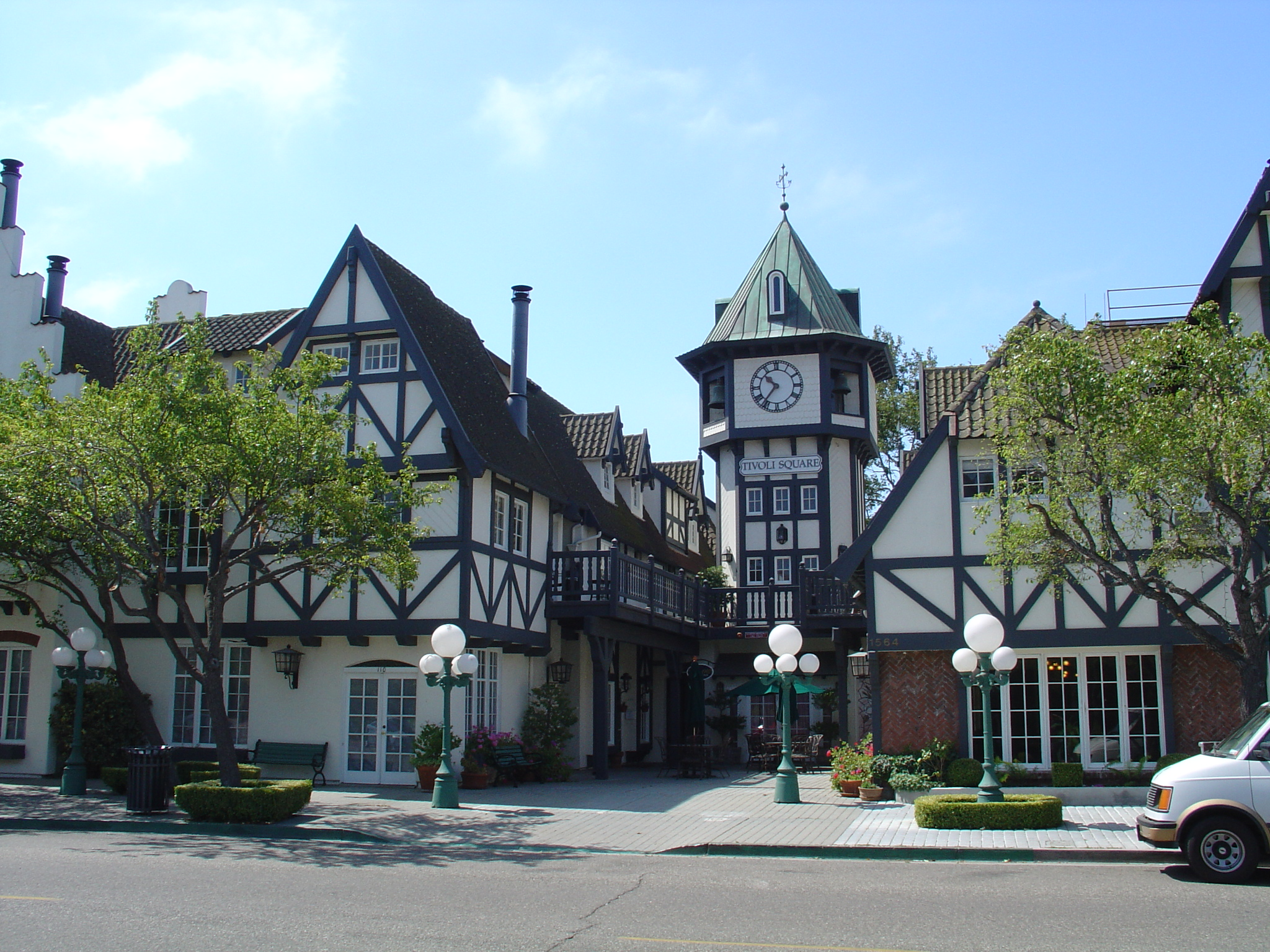
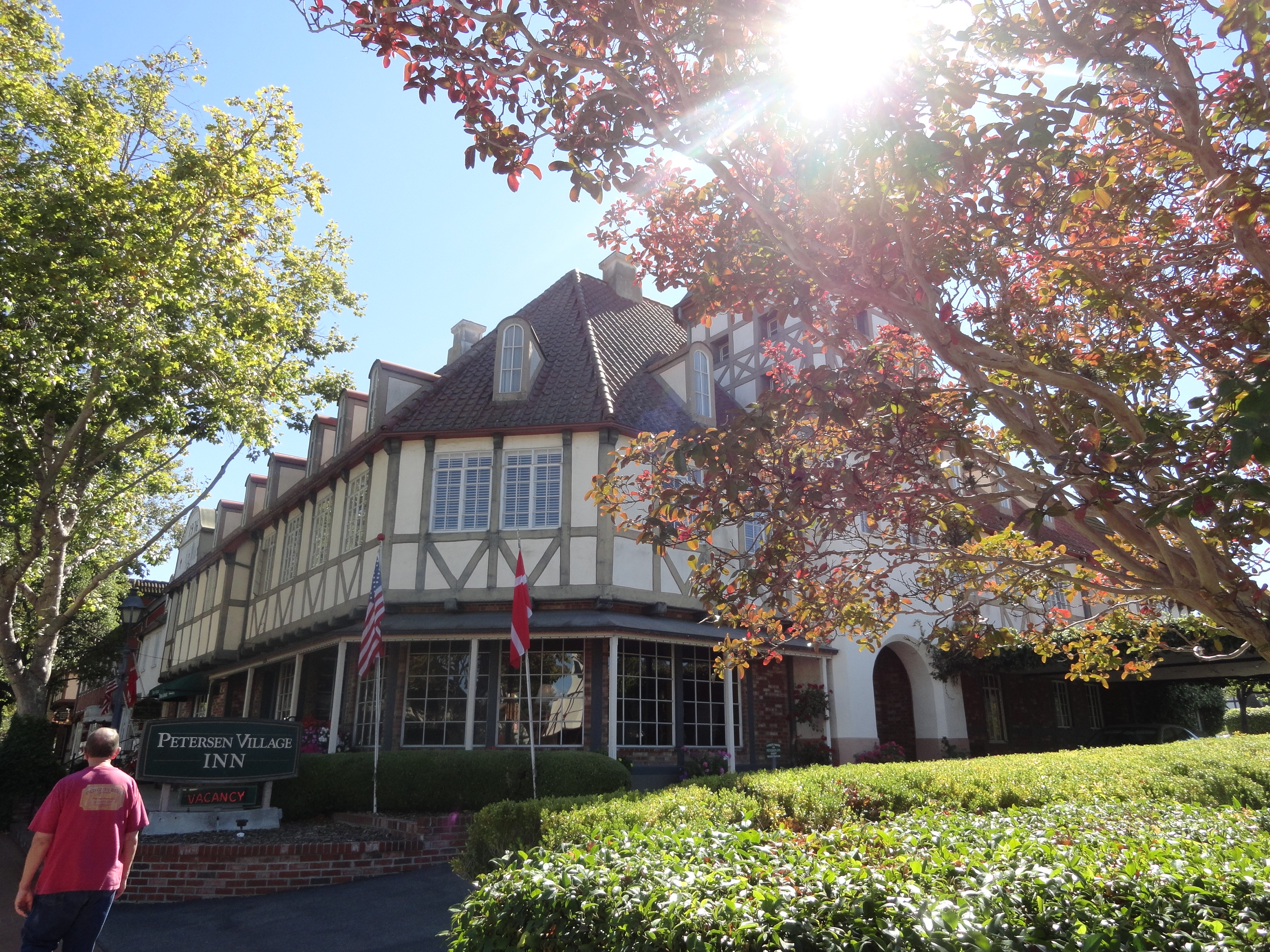
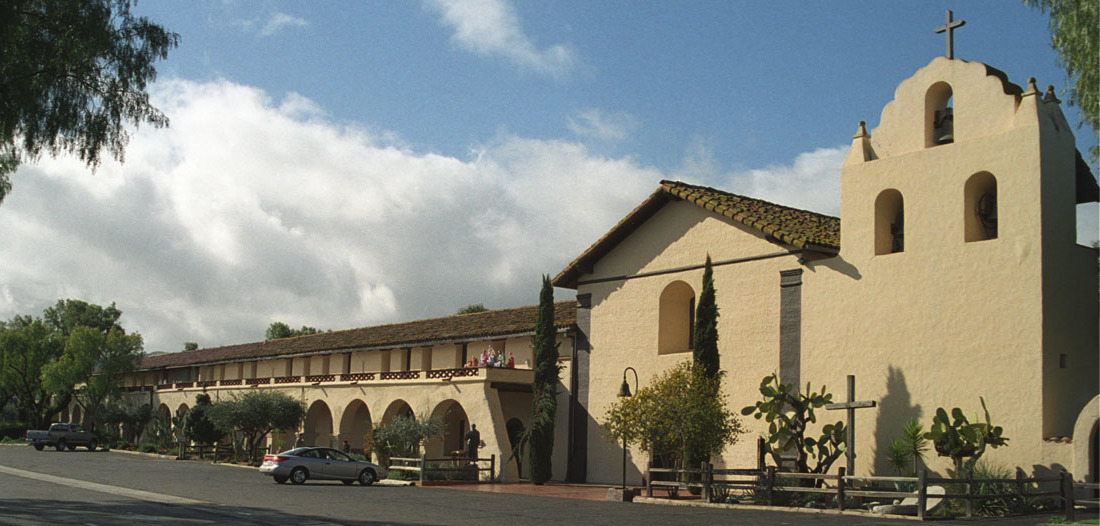
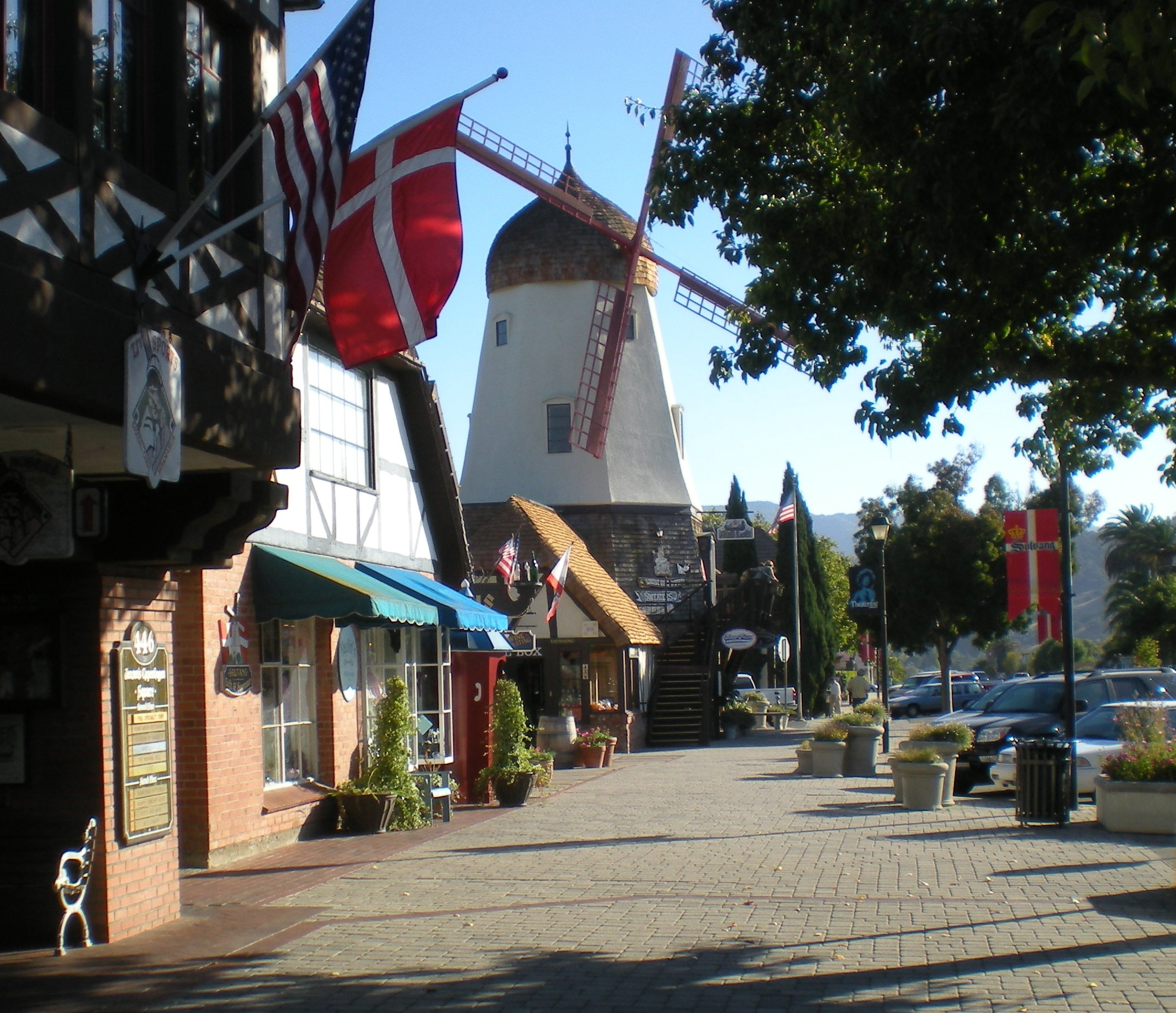
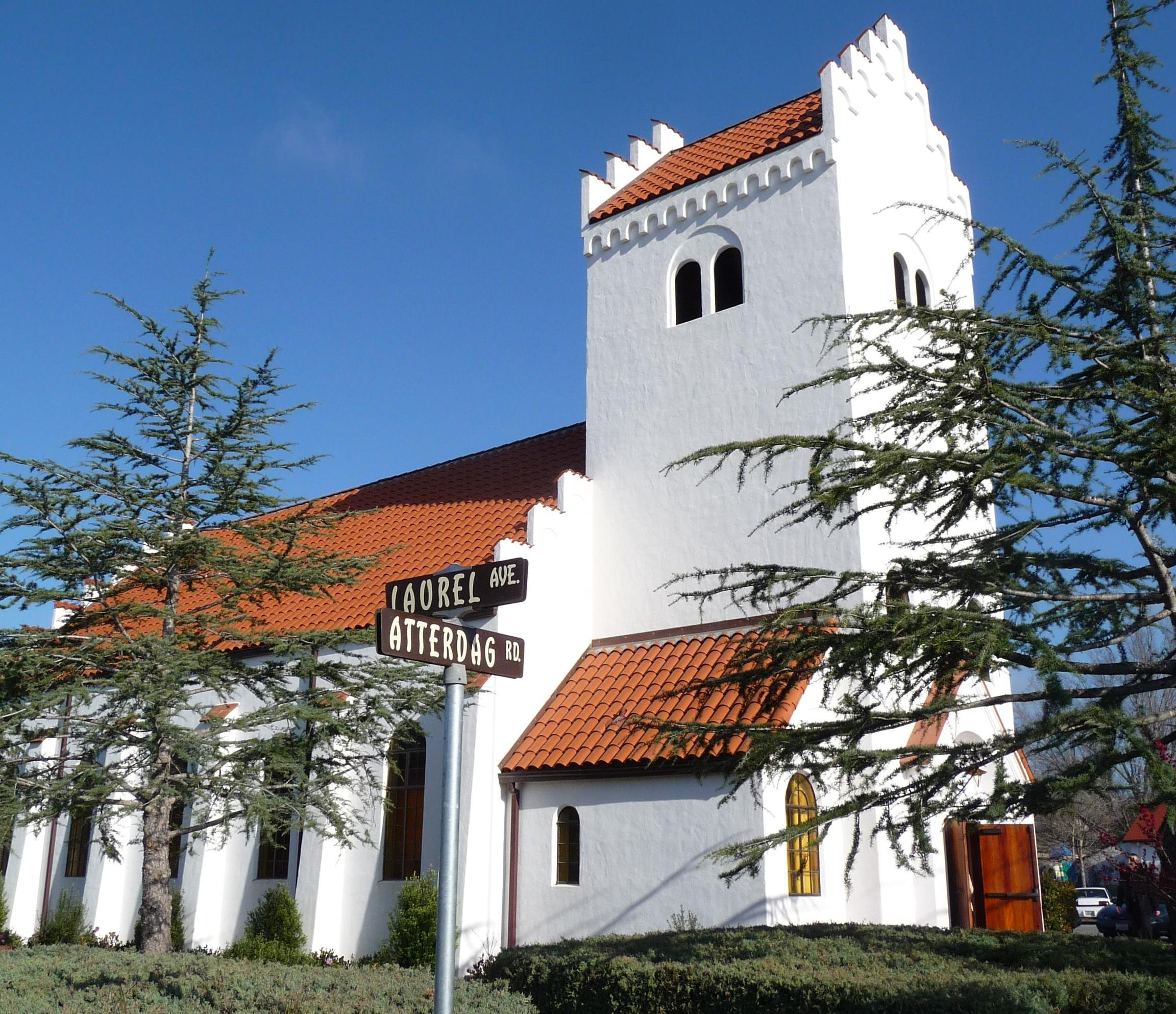
- Top: Tivoli Square, Petersen Village Inn; middle: Mission Santa Inés; bottom: Solvang windmill, Bethania Church

- Flag Seal Banner Flag
- Nickname: Danish Capital of America
- Interactive map of Solvang, California
- Location in the United States Solvang (California) Solvang (the United States)
- Coordinates: 34°35′38″N 120°8′23″W
- Country: United States
- State: California
- County: Santa Barbara
- Established: 1911
- Incorporated: May 1, 1985

Government
  - Mayor: David Brown

Area
  - Total: 2.42 sq mi (6.28 km^{2})
  - Land: 2.42 sq mi (6.28 km^{2})
  - Water: 0 sq mi (0.00 km^{2})
- Elevation: 505 ft (154 m)

Population (2020)
  - Total: 6,126
  - Density: 2,530/sq mi (975/km^{2})
- Time zone: UTC−08:00 (PST)
  - Summer (DST): UTC−07:00 (PDT)
- ZIP Codes: 93463-93464
- Area code: 805
- FIPS code: 06-72576
- GNIS feature IDs: 1661468, 2411925
- Website: cityofsolvang.com

Solvang (/ˈsɒlvæŋ/; Danish for "sunny field") is a city in Santa Barbara County, California, United States. Located in the Santa Ynez Valley, Solvang was founded in 1911 and incorporated as a city on May 1, 1985. The population was 6,126 at the 2020 census. Solvang has been described as "The Danish Capital of America".

In 1804, Mission Santa Inés was founded by the Spanish under Esteban Tápis. A small community grew up around the mission called "Santa Inés" during the Mexican period, but it was largely abandoned after the American Conquest of California. In 1911, a new settlement was founded around the mission by a group of Danish Americans who purchased 9,000 acres (3,600 ha) of the surrounding Rancho San Carlos de Jonata, to establish a Danish community far from Midwestern winters. The community began building Danish-themed architecture in 1947, and has since become a tourist destination with 1.5 million visitors per year. The community attracts tourists from Nordic countries, and has been the subject of several Danish royal visits including Prince Henrik in 2011. A minority of residents in the 21st century are of Danish origin.

== History ==
=== Beginnings ===
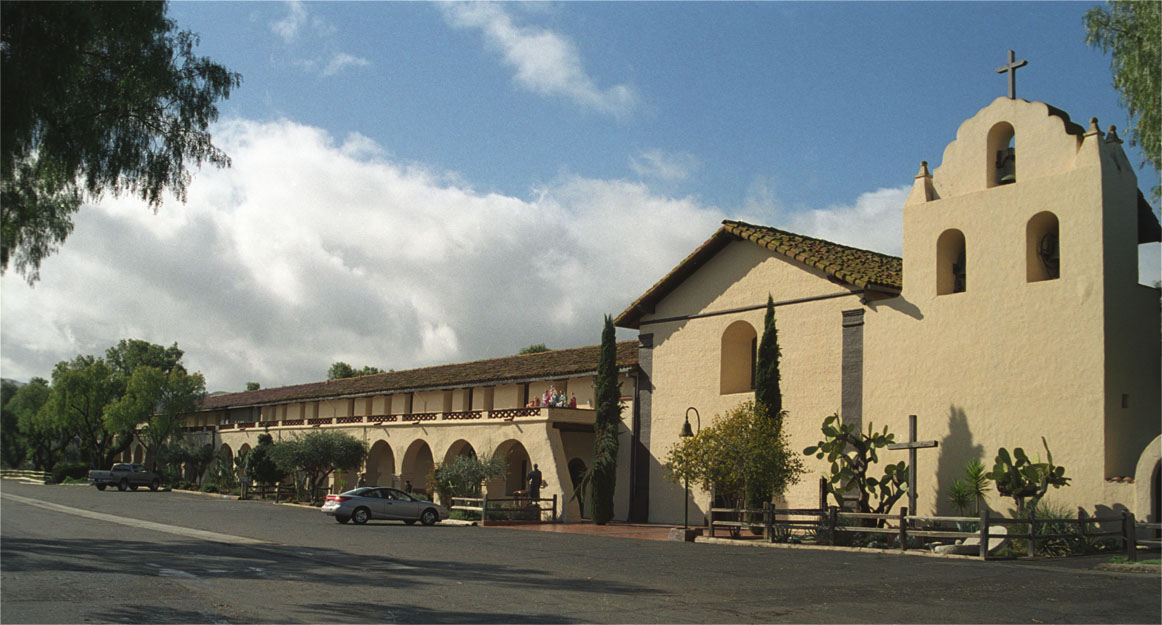
Mission Santa Inés in Solvang

The Santa Ynez Valley, in which Solvang lies, was originally inhabited by the Chumash, identified by Father Pedro Font, chaplain of the 1776 Anza Expedition, and were described as an ingenious and industrious people who are good fishermen and hunters, with an excellent astronomical system.

As part of the expansion of the mission system established in California by Spanish missionaries, Father Estévan Tapís founded Mission Santa Inés, now located near the center of Solvang, in order to relieve overcrowding at Mission Santa Barbara and Mission La Purísima Concepción since it was located midway between the two. It also served as a gateway to the Chumash Indians living east of the Coast Range.

After the Mexican War of Independence, the Mexican Assembly passed the Secularization Laws which confiscated Mission lands, along with other property, and transferred them to the control of local ranchers, with Solvang being later founded on what became known as the Rancho San Carlos de Jonata. With secularization, Mission Santa Inés began to decline and the Chumash Indian population in the area along with it. For a time, the mission was a seminary but soon began to deteriorate; it was repaired by the Donahue family in 1884 and renovated by Fr. Alexander Buckler in 1904.

=== Danish settlement ===
Between 1865 and 1914, 300,000 Danes had immigrated to United States, some of whom headed west into California. Three men—Benedict Nordentoft, Jens Gregersen, and Peder Hornsyld—sought and found land to grow a Danish settlement. Initially the settlement was like any other pioneer town in California. In 1910, Danish-Americans created the Danish-American Colony Company in San Francisco. Later that year, suitable land was found in the Santa Ynez Valley northwest of Santa Barbara, and in 1911, they acquired almost 9,000 acres (36 km^{2}) of the Rancho San Carlos de Jonata land grant, paying an average of $40 per acre.

Solvang was established in 1911 for cultural, educational, and religious purposes. A hotel was built close to the Mission where new arrivals could be housed, and a school opened in 1911, with 21 students.

=== Expansion and development ===
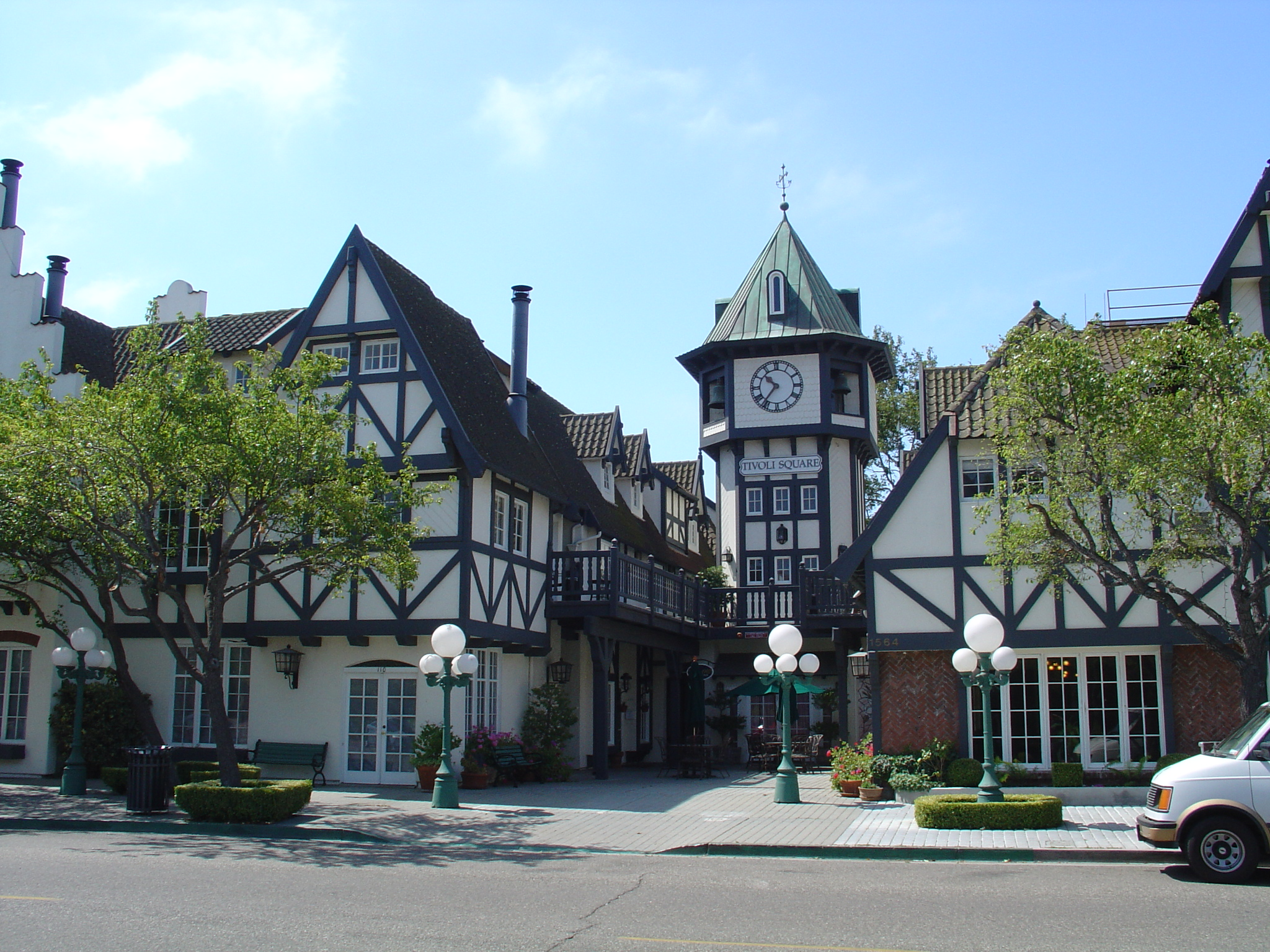
Tivoli Square, Solvang

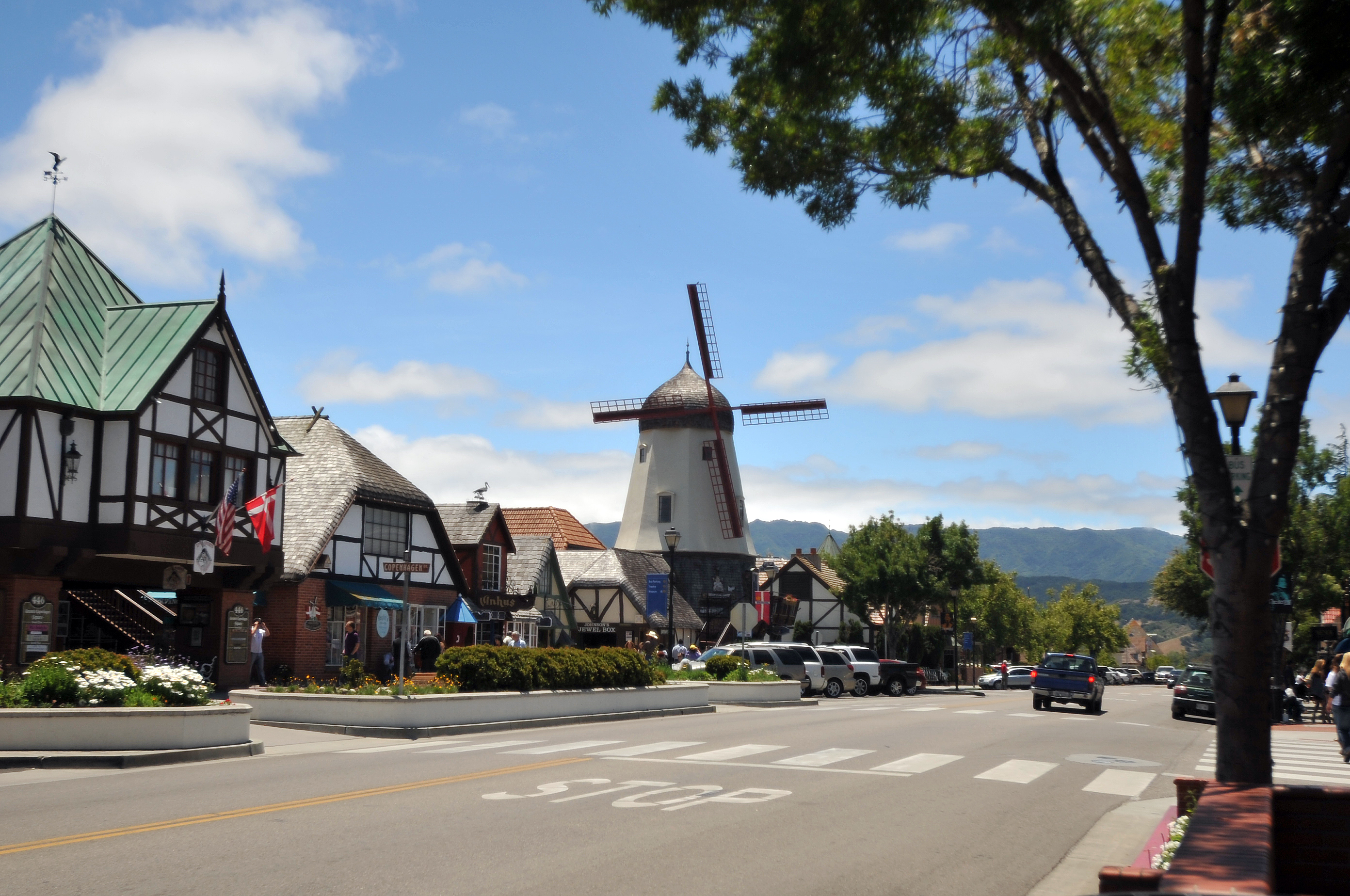
Main Street, Solvang. Alisal Road

In 1912, when it became difficult to sell any more plots of land, developers from Solvang travelled to Iowa and Nebraska to persuade Danish immigrants to buy land in the town. This attracted new settlers. The early settlement had a store, a bank, a lumber yard, a barbershop and a post office. During the 1920s, civic amenities such as electricity were installed in the town.

=== Folk high school ===
In 1914, Atterdag College opened, named after Valdemar IV of Denmark. The school taught Danish-speaking students in their late teens a curriculum that emphasized lectures, singing, gymnastics, folk dancing and fellowship; teaching both Danish and American curriculum. There were no examinations or degrees, and learning was mutual with teachers and students living, eating and studying together. Among the popular recreation and sports that were taught were folk dance and gymnastics. During World War I, enrollment dropped due to reduced Danish immigration, and a rise in nationalism. The school was sold to the Solvang Lutheran church in 1921. Atterdag College continued to be used as a folk school, community meeting hall, performing arts venue, gymnastics center, summer school, and boarding house until it was demolished in 1970, and then replace by the Solvang Lutheran Home.

=== Danish church ===
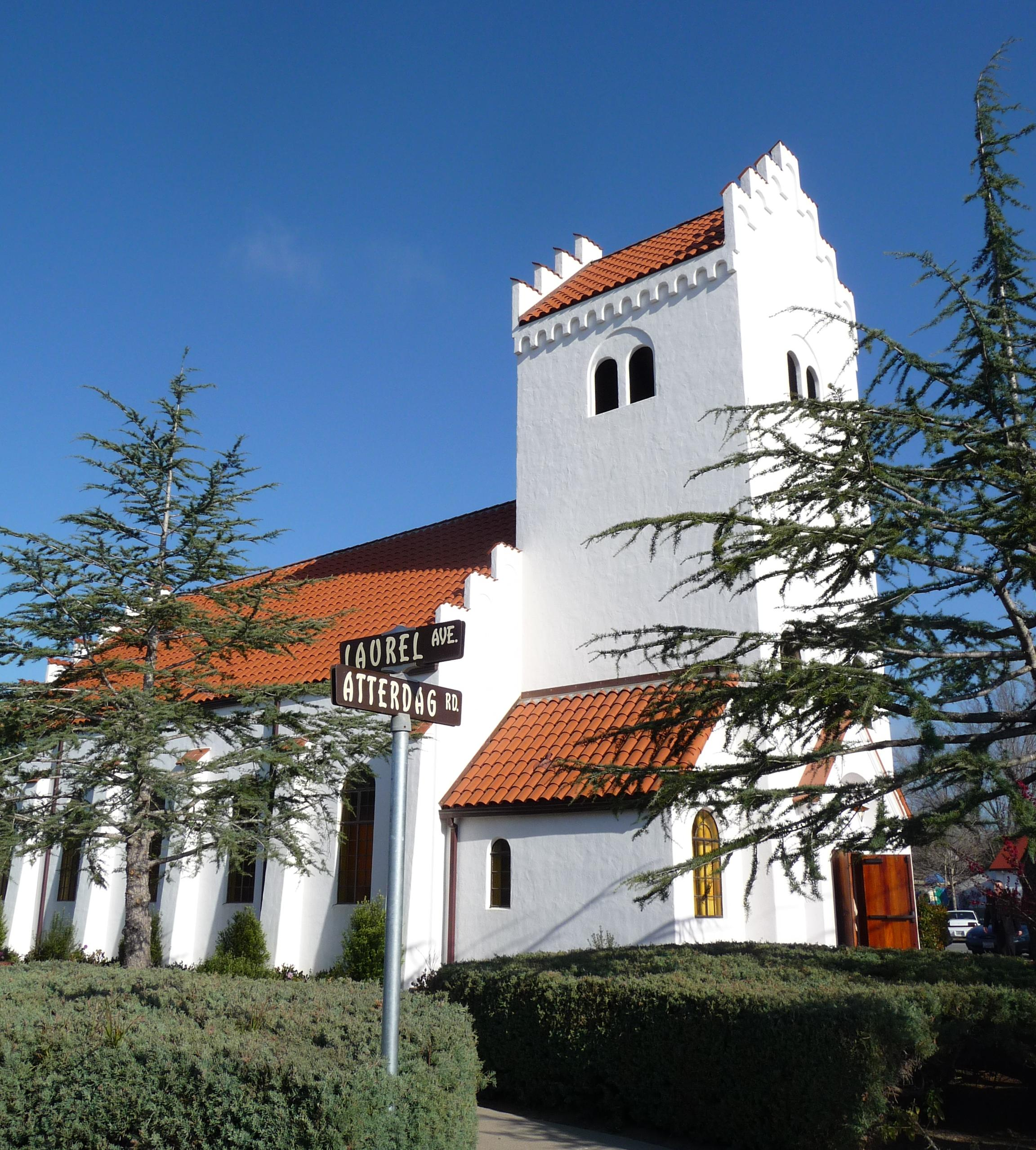
Bethania Lutheran Church

The Bethania Evangelical Lutheran Church opened in 1928, designed as a Gothic-styled, 14th century rural Danish church. Originally, the services were mainly in Danish, but are now in English.

=== Danish-styled architecture ===
Initially, most of Solvang's buildings were built in the same style as others in the area. The Lutheran church was the first to be based on Danish architecture and bears a close relationship to Danish equivalents. In 1931 Earl Petersen, a local architect, gave the older buildings a new look, adding façades in so-called "Danish Provincial" style. It was a Danish medieval bindingsverk design. The pioneer of the Danish Provincial style was Ferdinand Sorensen, originally from Nebraska. In the mid-1940s, after returning to Solvang from a trip to Denmark, he first completed Møllebakken, his Danish-styled home, and then went on to build the first of the village's four windmills. But after World War II, interest grew in the concept of a "Danish Village." Buildings in the half-timbered style of Danish rural houses proliferated, creating a new tourist attraction. While much was done to create an "authentic" Danish atmosphere in the town center, it has been pointed out by Scandinavians that fake thatched roofs and artificial timbering are largely a result of local interests in general rather than those of the Danish immigrants themselves. The older buildings have simply been restyled to look Danish even if there was nothing Danish about them originally.

=== Subsequent development ===
During the 1920s, the proportion of non-Danish residents rose substantially and local businesses and churches began providing services in English, in addition to traditional Danish. In the 1930s, Solvang became the largest town in the Santa Ynez Valley and a commercial hub for the local region. By the late 1940s, Solvang's growth stagnated as the town's economic activity focused predominately on agriculture, prompting younger residents to leave in search of more diverse job opportunities. In 1947, the town was featured in an article in The Saturday Evening Post entitled "Little Denmark," which praised Solvang's quaint rural charms and sparked a tourism boom prompting residents of Los Angeles and San Francisco to take weekend trips to Solvang.

Solvang subsequently developed a tourism industry focused on emphasizing the town's Danish heritage. Up to the 1980s, all changes to downtown occurred without city government, mainly by businessmen and selling bonds. In 1985, Solvang became incorporated as California's 440th city and afterwards made the town look uniformly with Danish-Provincial style. Numerous older buildings were demolished.

The 2004 film Sideways brought attention to the vineyards in the surrounding Santa Ynez Valley and tasting rooms have opened. Restaurants are also part of the revitalization of Solvang as it becomes a destination for locally sourced fare.

== Geography ==
Solvang is located in the Santa Ynez Valley, some 46 miles (74 km) northwest of Santa Barbara and approximately 15 miles (24 km) north of the Pacific coast. According to the United States Census Bureau, the city has a total area of 2.4 square miles (6.2 km^{2}), of which 99.95% is land and 0.05% is water.

=== Climate ===
Solvang enjoys sunshine throughout the year with clear, warm days and cool nights. Average temperatures vary between 52 and 72 °F (11 and 22 °C) with highs reaching the lower 90s °F (lower 30s °C) and winter lows in the upper 30s °F (between 2 and 5 °C). Furthermore, Solvang experiences large diurnal temperature variations, especially in the summer, when daily temperatures vary on average by almost 40 °F (22 °C) Average annual rainfall for Solvang (recorded between 1964 and 2010) is 19.31 inches (490 mm).

Solvang is 140 miles (230 km) northwest of Los Angeles.

Climate data for Solvang, California
Month	Jan	Feb	Mar	Apr	May	Jun	Jul	Aug	Sep	Oct	Nov	Dec	Year
Record high °F (°C)	88 (31)	92 (33)	95 (35)	105 (41)	104 (40)	115 (46)	119 (48)	115 (46)	122 (50)	110 (43)	100 (38)	94 (34)	122 (50)
Mean daily maximum °F (°C)	65.3 (18.5)	66.7 (19.3)	68.8 (20.4)	72.9 (22.7)	77.5 (25.3)	83.8 (28.8)	90.6 (32.6)	91.0 (32.8)	88.1 (31.2)	82.1 (27.8)	73.2 (22.9)	66.3 (19.1)	77.2 (25.1)
Daily mean °F (°C)	52 (11)	53.5 (11.9)	55.3 (12.9)	58.2 (14.6)	62.1 (16.7)	66.6 (19.2)	71.3 (21.8)	71.6 (22.0)	69.8 (21.0)	65.0 (18.3)	58.0 (14.4)	52.5 (11.4)	61.3 (16.3)
Mean daily minimum °F (°C)	38.6 (3.7)	40.3 (4.6)	41.8 (5.4)	43.4 (6.3)	46.8 (8.2)	49.3 (9.6)	52.1 (11.2)	52.2 (11.2)	51.4 (10.8)	48.0 (8.9)	42.8 (6.0)	38.6 (3.7)	45.4 (7.4)
Record low °F (°C)	20 (−7)	22 (−6)	25 (−4)	27 (−3)	31 (−1)	32 (0)	36 (2)	34 (1)	34 (1)	27 (−3)	25 (−4)	16 (−9)	16 (−9)
Average precipitation inches (mm)	4.4 (110)	4.7 (120)	3.5 (89)	1.5 (38)	0.4 (10)	0.0 (0.0)	0.0 (0.0)	0.0 (0.0)	0.2 (5.1)	0.7 (18)	1.9 (48)	3.1 (79)	20.5 (520)
Average precipitation days	7	7	7	4	2	0	0	0	1	2	4	6	40

== Demographics ==
Historical population
Census	Pop.	Note	%±
1960	1,325		—
1970	2,004		51.2%
1980	3,091		54.2%
1990	4,741		53.4%
2000	5,332		12.5%
2010	5,245		−1.6%
2020	6,126		16.8%
U.S. Decennial Census; 1860–1870 1880-1890; 1900 1910 1920; 1930 1940 1950; 1960 1970 1980; 1990 2000 2010; 2020

=== 2020 census ===
As of the 2020 census, Solvang had a population of 6,126 and a population density of 2,526.2 inhabitants per square mile (975.4/km^{2}). The median age was 50.9 years, and the age distribution was 16.6% under the age of 18, 6.7% aged 18 to 24, 19.8% aged 25 to 44, 26.6% aged 45 to 64, and 30.3% who were 65 years of age or older. For every 100 females there were 88.7 males, and for every 100 females age 18 and over there were 86.3 males age 18 and over.

The Census reported that 94.2% of the population lived in households, 2.4% lived in non-institutionalized group quarters, and 3.3% were institutionalized. 96.8% of residents lived in urban areas, while 3.2% lived in rural areas.

There were 2,463 households in Solvang, of which 26.7% had children under the age of 18 living in them. Of all households, 50.3% were married-couple households, 5.7% were cohabiting couple households, 14.0% were households with a male householder and no spouse or partner present, and 30.0% were households with a female householder and no spouse or partner present. About 28.8% of all households were made up of individuals and 16.4% had someone living alone who was 65 years of age or older. The average household size was 2.34. There were 1,572 families (63.8% of all households).

There were 2,621 housing units at an average density of 1,080.8 units per square mile (417.3 units/km^{2}), of which 2,463 (94.0%) were occupied. Of occupied units, 58.9% were owner-occupied and 41.1% were renter-occupied. The homeowner vacancy rate was 1.0% and the rental vacancy rate was 1.9%.

Racial composition as of the 2020 census
Race	Number	Percent
White	4,161	67.9%
Black or African American	50	0.8%
American Indian and Alaska Native	81	1.3%
Asian	115	1.9%
Native Hawaiian and Other Pacific Islander	0	0.0%
Some other race	789	12.9%
Two or more races	930	15.2%
Hispanic or Latino (of any race)	1,835	30.0%

=== Income and poverty ===
In 2023, the US Census Bureau estimated that the median household income was $118,208, and the per capita income was $76,064. About 5.4% of families and 7.7% of the population were below the poverty line.

=== 2010 census ===
The 2010 United States census reported that Solvang had a population of 5,245. The population density was 2,161.6 inhabitants per square mile (834.6/km^{2}). The racial makeup of Solvang was 4,326 (82.5%) White, 38 (0.7%) African American, 59 (1.1%) Native American, 72 (1.4%) Asian, 1 (0.0%) Pacific Islander, 611 (11.6%) from other races, and 138 (2.6%) from two or more races. There were 1,530 Hispanic or Latino residents, of any race (29.2%).

The Census reported that 5,190 people (99.0% of the population) lived in households, 3 (0.1%) lived in non-institutionalized group quarters, and 52 (1.0%) were institutionalized.

There were 2,173 households, out of which 611 (28.1%) had children under the age of 18 living in them, 1,081 (49.7%) were opposite-sex married couples living together, 183 (8.4%) had a female householder with no husband present, 121 (5.6%) had a male householder with no wife present. There were 120 (5.5%) unmarried opposite-sex partnerships, and 18 (0.8%) same-sex married couples or partnerships. 636 households (29.3%) were made up of individuals, and 303 (13.9%) had someone living alone who was 65 years of age or older. The average household size was 2.39. There were 1,385 families (63.7% of all households); the average family size was 2.97.

There were 1,094 residents (20.9%) under the age of 18, 384 (7.3%) aged 18 to 24, 1,142 (21.8%) 25 to 44, 1,530 (29.2%) 45 to 64, and 1,095 residents (20.9%) who were 65 years of age or older. The median age was 45.0 years. For every 100 females, there were 93.0 males. For every 100 females age 18 and over, there were 90.7 males.

There were 2,485 housing units at an average density of 1,024.1 units per square mile (395.4 units/km^{2}), of which 1,257 (57.8%) were owner-occupied, and 916 (42.2%) were occupied by renters. The homeowner vacancy rate was 3.8%; the rental vacancy rate was 6.9%. 2,872 people (54.8% of the population) lived in owner-occupied housing units and 2,318 people (44.2%) lived in rental housing units.

== Economy ==
=== Top employers ===
According to Solvang's 2024 Annual Comprehensive Financial Report, the top employers in the city were:

#	Employer	# of employees
1	The Alisal Guest Ranch & Resort	369
2	Atterdag Village (formerly Solvang Lutheran Home)	182
3	Santa Ynez Valley Cottage Hospital	107
4	New Frontiers Market	103
5	Landsby/ Mad&Vin	70
6	Solvang Unified School District	66
7	Valley Fresh Market	55
8	Solvang Brew	54
9	Santa Ynez Band of Chumash Mission Indians	40
10	City of Solvang	32

== Arts and culture ==
=== Tourism ===
Solvang is a tourist attraction with over one million visitors per year. Tourists were initially attracted to Solvang by the visit of Denmark's Prince Frederik in April 1939. But it was in 1947, following a feature article in The Saturday Evening Post, that they began to flock to the town. Sights include the Danish windmills, the statues of Hans Christian Andersen and The Little Mermaid replica, the half-timbered houses, the Danish rural church, the Round Tower as well as Danish music and folk dancing. Several restaurants and pastry shops serve Danish specialities. A replica of a 19th-century Danish streetcar, the horse-drawn Hønen ("the hen"), takes visitors on sightseeing tours around downtown Solvang. Partly as a result of the 2004 film Sideways, which was set in the surrounding Santa Ynez Valley, the number of wine-related businesses in Solvang has increased, attracting oenophiles to the downtown area.

=== Museums ===
- The Elverhøj Museum, named after a Danish play from 1928 named Elverhøj, housed in the former residence of artist Viggo Brandt-Erichsen, is devoted to preserving the Danish heritage of Solvang with its Danish-American pioneer spirit. The building which was completed in 1950 is inspired by the 18th-century farmhouses of northern Jutland. After extensive renovation, the museum opened to the public in May 1988. The cottage in the garden houses a diorama of scale models depicting Solvang in the 1920s. From January to April 2011, the museum was hosting an exhibition entitled "Spirit of Solvang" consisting of a series of old black-and-white photographs of the village enhanced by local resident Paul Roark.
- The Hans Christian Andersen Museum, located above The Book Loft, is devoted to presenting the author's life and works. Displays include models of Andersen's childhood home and of "The Princess and the Pea." The museum also contains hundreds of volumes of Andersen's works, including many illustrated first editions.
- The Vintage Motorcycle Museum displays machines from the private collection of Virgil Elings, a veteran motocross and road racer. While there is an emphasis on vintage racing bikes, the collection is quite broad and ranges from 1910 to the present.

=== Danish Days ===
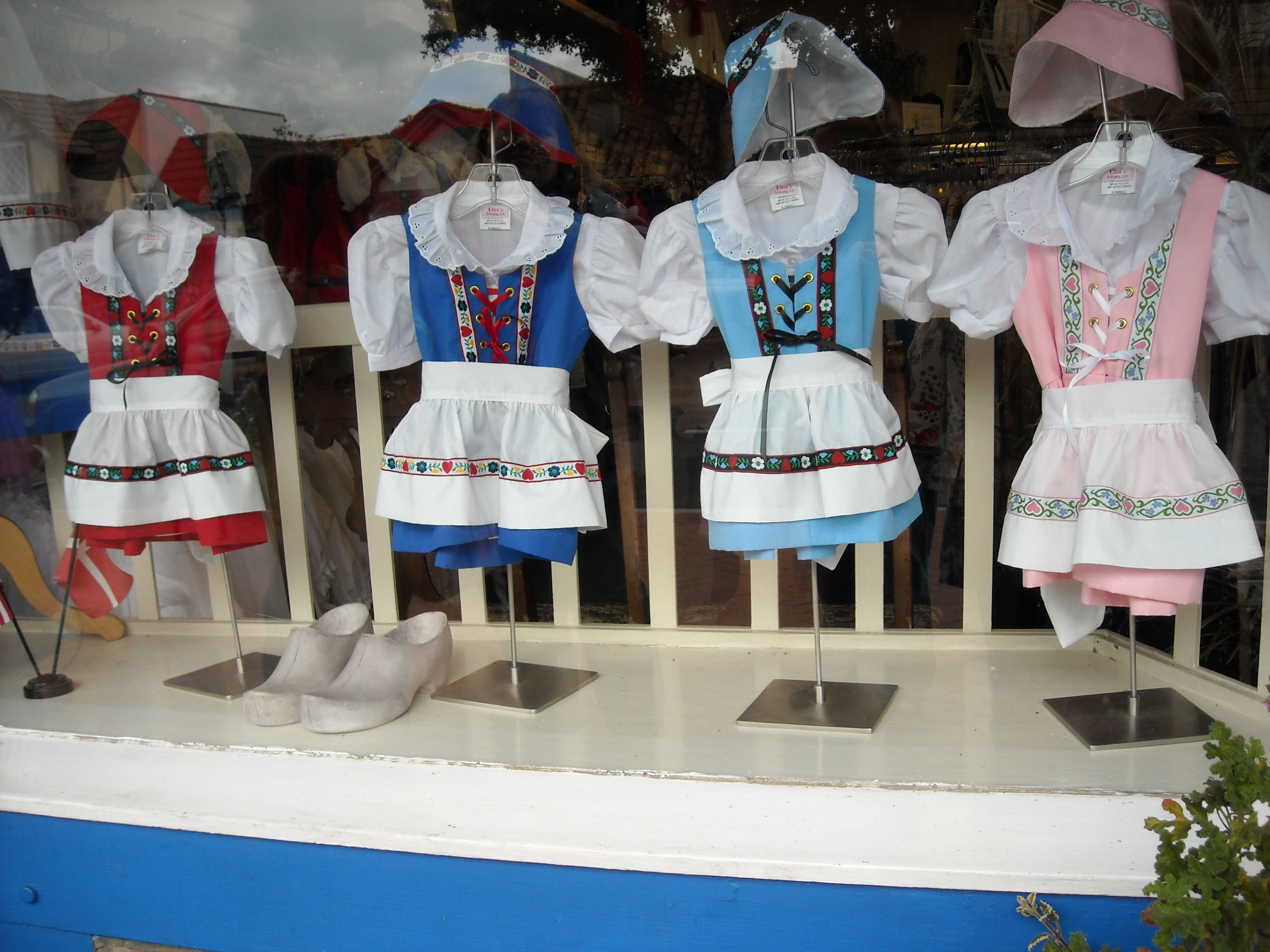
Imitation Danish costumes on sale in Solvang

Since 1936 Solvang has celebrated Danish folk traditions at its annual "Danish Days" event. The first time it was celebrated was June 5, Grundlovsdag (Demark's Constitution Day), in 1936; and it included parades, folk dancing, gymnastics, theater, concerts, and street dancing. Led by a "Danish Maid," the program consists of æbleskiver eating competitions, music, dancing, and processions through the downtown area with floats, marching groups, marching bands, folk dancers and singers. A Danish Days breakfast on Sunday morning features medisterpølser, a spiced pork sausage recipe of Danish origins, and æbleskiver.

=== Festival Theater ===
The 700-seat open-air Festival Theater was built in 1974 following the success of a makeshift performance of Hamlet in 1971 in the town park. Strong support from the local business community, Donovan Marley (director of the Pacific Conservatory of the Performing Arts), and Earl Petersen (a local architect), allowed the structure to be completed in record time. Recent productions have included West Side Story and Les Misérables. The style of the exterior is reminiscent of both Danish and Elizabethan architecture.

=== Royal visits ===
On April 7, 1939, Danish Crown Prince Frederik and Princess Ingrid visited Solvang; at the time, a large number of the town's 400 residents were Danish immigrants. They drove through the grounds of Atterdag College and attended a Good Friday service at Bethania Church.

On June 5, 1960, Princess Margrethe of Denmark paid a visit which included a reception at Palacio del Rio, lunch at Bethania Church and a tour of downtown Solvang. She returned on May 23, 1976, as Queen of Denmark together with her husband, Prince Henrik. After a formal luncheon in the Parish Hall, the couple visited Bethania Church and the Solvang Lutheran Home before greeting residents on Copenhagen Drive. Shortly after her visit, the queen awarded Solvang developer Ferdinand Sorensen the Order of the Dannebrog for strengthening ties between the United States and Denmark.

During Solvang's centennial celebrations in 2011, the city was visited by Friis Arne Petersen, the Danish ambassador to the United States, and by Prince Henrik of Denmark.

== Parks and recreation ==
=== Bicycling ===
Solvang is a popular destination for bicyclists, and has been featured as a race location on the Tour of California. The surrounding countryside and variable terrain provide a variety of conditions useful for training. Two annual amateur bicycling events are held in Solvang: the Solvang Century (held in March) and the Solvang Prelude (held in November).

The Tour of California cycle race has had time trial stages in Solvang on four occasions; 2007, 2008, 2009 and 2011.

== Media ==
=== Local media ===
- The Santa Ynez Valley News is a weekly newspaper published in Solvang since 1925.
- KSYV is a non-commercial radio station licensed to Solvang since 1982.

=== Filming location ===
- Solvang was one of the two locations featured in the William Castle film, Homicidal (1961). The location used for the drugstore and flowershop still stands today and remains relatively unchanged.
- Parts of the horror film The Unseen (1980) were filmed in Solvang along or near Mission Drive, with particular use made of the Bit O' Denmark Restaurant and the Solvang Gardens Lodge, which was known as the Solvang Gaard Lodge at the time of filming.
- Much of the Oscar-winning film Sideways (2004) was filmed in Solvang and in nearby Buellton.
- Much of the Netflix film Paddleton (2019) takes place in Solvang.
- Season 3 episode 9 of USA Network's Psych, entitled "Christmas Joy" (aired 2008) features scenes shot in Solvang. The series takes place mostly in nearby Santa Barbara.
- The Lifetime film A Very Charming Christmas Town (2020) written and directed by Jake Helgren takes place almost entirely in Solvang, who centered his entire script around the history of the town.

=== Television ===
- Solvang was referenced in the Fallout TV Series, where Vault 33 Overseer Betty was living before the Great War.
- In Season 19 episode 6 of The Simpsons (Little Orphan Millie), they make a reference to Solvang as the place where an uncle of Milhouse's lives.
- In the sixth season episode "Rumspringa" of New Girl, Nick, Schmidt and Jess go to Solvang.

== Infrastructure ==
=== Transportation ===
State Route 246 runs through Solvang as Mission Drive, connecting Buellton and U.S. Route 101 to the west, and Santa Ynez and Highway 154 to the east.

Although most of Solvang's visitors arrive by car, there are three Amtrak Thruway bus connections per day for those arriving at Santa Barbara by rail. The Santa Ynez Valley Transit bus service connects Buellton, Solvang, Santa Ynez, and Los Olivos. The Clean Air Express now connects Solvang and Buellton to Goleta and Santa Barbara.

The nearby Santa Ynez Airport caters to general aviation.

=== Public safety ===
The Santa Barbara County Sheriff's Office has a sub station in Solvang, while the Solvang Volunteer Fire Department was disbanded in April 2007 and replaced with a contract from the Santa Barbara County Fire Department.

== Notable people ==
- Greta Andersen, Danish-American swimmer, lived in Solvang from 2017 to her death in 2023.
- Kenny Baker, singer and actor, resided and died in Solvang.
- Al Gionfriddo, outfielder and hero for the Brooklyn Dodgers in the 1947 World Series, resided and died in Solvang.
- Patricia Hitchcock, actress and only child of film director Alfred Hitchcock, resided in Solvang.
- Ska-punk band Mad Caddies calls Solvang its home.
- Beach volleyball Olympic gold medalist Todd Rogers lives in Solvang with his family.
- Professional cyclist Alison Tetrick was born in Solvang.
- Jose Villa, celebrity wedding photographer
- Stephanie Zimbalist lives part-time in the valley where she has a house inherited from her late father Efrem Zimbalist Jr.
- Thor Nis Christiansen, serial killer

== Sister city ==
- Denmark, Aalborg, since 1971.

== See also ==
- Kingsburg, a "Swedish village" in Fresno County, California
- Helen, Georgia
- Leavenworth, Washington, a Bavarian theme town developed with assistance from Solvang.
- Frankenmuth, Michigan
- Poulsbo, Washington, a Norwegian village in Kitsap County, Washington
