= Rancho San Carlos de Jonata =

Mexican land grant in California, United States

Coordinates: 34.650°N 120.190°W

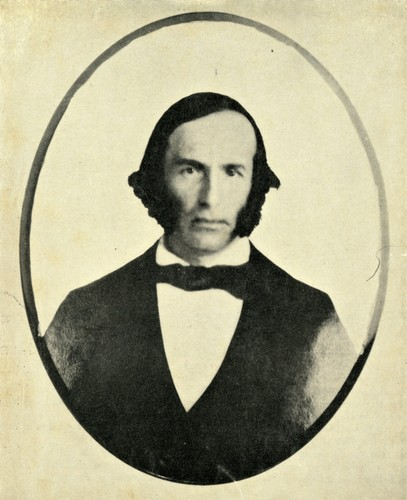
Rancho San Carlos de Jonata was granted to José M. Covarrubias, a Californio politician.

Rancho San Carlos de Jonata was a 26,634-acre (107.78 km^{2}) Mexican land grant in present-day Santa Barbara County, California given in 1845 by Governor Pío Pico to Joaquín Carrillo and Jose Maria Covarrubias. The grant was west of Mission Santa Inés in the Santa Ynez Valley, and extended north from the Santa Ynez River along Zaca Creek. The grant encompasses present-day Solvang and Buellton.

== History ==
José Joaquin Carrillo (1801–1868) was the son of Domingo Antonio Ygnacio Carrillo (1791–1837) and Maria Concepcion Nicanor Pico (1797–1871). Joaquin Carrillo married Manuela Carrillo and served as Santa Barbara County Judge from 1851–1853, a position later held by José María Covarrubias from 1861–1863. Joaquín Carrillo owned with his brother Rancho Lompoc and Rancho Mission Vieja de la Purisma.

José María Covarrubias (c. 1809 – 1870), a Frenchman who became a Mexican citizen and came to California in 1834 with the Hijar-Padres Colony to be a schoolteacher. Covarrubias held several key government posts in Monterey and Santa Barbara. Covarrubias married María Carrillo, sister of Joaquín Carrillo. He served as alcalde at Santa Barbara. In 1843 Covarrubias received the Rancho Castac land grant. Covarrubias was a member of the 1849 California Constitutional Convention, and member of the California State Assembly for four terms 1849–1862. In 1850, Covarrubias bought the Island of Santa Catalina land grant from Thomas M. Robbins.

With the cession of California to the United States following the Mexican-American War, the 1848 Treaty of Guadalupe Hidalgo provided that the land grants would be honored. As required by the Land Act of 1851, a claim for the six square league Rancho San Carlos de Jonata was filed with the Public Land Commission in 1853, and the grant was patented to Joaquín Carrillo and José M. Covarrubias in 1872.

Rufus Thompson (R.T.) Buell (1827-1905) was born in Vermont. In 1853 Buell joined the California Gold Rush, but by 1857 was dairy farming in Marin County, and in 1865, Monterey County. In 1866, R.T. Buell and his brother, Alonzo Wilcox Buell, bought a quarter of Rancho San Carlos de Jonata from Joaquín Carrillo and José M. Covarrubias. By 1872 R.T had bought the entire Rancho, and dissolved the partnership with his brother Alonzo. A severe drought forced Buell to sell 11,000 acres (45 km^{2}) of the rancho in the 1870s.

This property was sold in 1911 to the Danish American Company to establish a Danish colony called "Solvang". The remaining rancho was partitioned among his seven heirs upon his death in 1915.

== See also ==
- Ranchos of California
- List of Ranchos of California
