= Esteban Tápis =

Spanish missionary to the Americas

Esteve Tapis (25 August 1754 – 3 November 1825) was a Spanish missionary to the Americas.

== Biography ==
Tapis was born in Santa Coloma de Farners in the Catalan Province of Girona, and entered the novitiate of the Order of Friars Minor at Girona on 22 January 1778. He was sent to New Spain in 1786, where he attended the Colegio San Francisco in Mexico City to train for missionary work among the Native Americans. He then was assigned to Alta California, arriving in 1790, where he worked at the following missions:

- Mission San Luis Obispo de Tolosa (1790–1793)
- Mission Santa Bárbara (1793–1806)
- Mission San Carlos Borromeo de Carmelo (1806–1811)
- Mission La Purísima Concepción (1812–1813)
- Mission Santa Inés (1813–1814)
- Mission San Juan Bautista (1815–1825)

When the President of the Spanish missions in California, Fermín Francisco de Lasuén, O.F.M, died in 1803, Tapis took over as acting President, a post to which he was subsequently elected three times, holding the office from 1803 to 1812. During his administration, Tapis directed the founding of Mission Santa Inés in 1804. In addition to his authority over the missions, he also served as the local Rural Dean of the Diocese of Sonora which covered that region in that period, responsible for Church matters of any Catholic there.

Tapis retired as President in 1812 and was sent to assist Felipe Arroyo de la Cuesta at Mission San Juan Bautista in 1815, where he hoped to educate the boys of the indigenous population. Possessing a special talent for music, he created a system using colors for different types of music notes which made it easier for the students to follow, and his choir of Native American boys performed for many visitors, earning the Mission San Juan Bautista the nickname of the "Mission of Music." Two of his handwritten choir books are preserved at the San Juan Bautista Museum.

Much of Tapis' correspondence has survived. The largest work is his writings in defense of the missions and their methods against the Captain of the Presidio in Santa Barbara.

Tapis died at Mission San Juan Bautista in 1825, at age 71, and is buried in the Mission sanctuary.

Catholic Church titles
Preceded by Fermín Lasuén	President-General of the Missions of Alta California; 1803–1812	Succeeded by José Francisco de Paula Señan
