= Santa Ynez Valley Cottage Hospital =

Hospital in Solvang, California

- Cottage Health
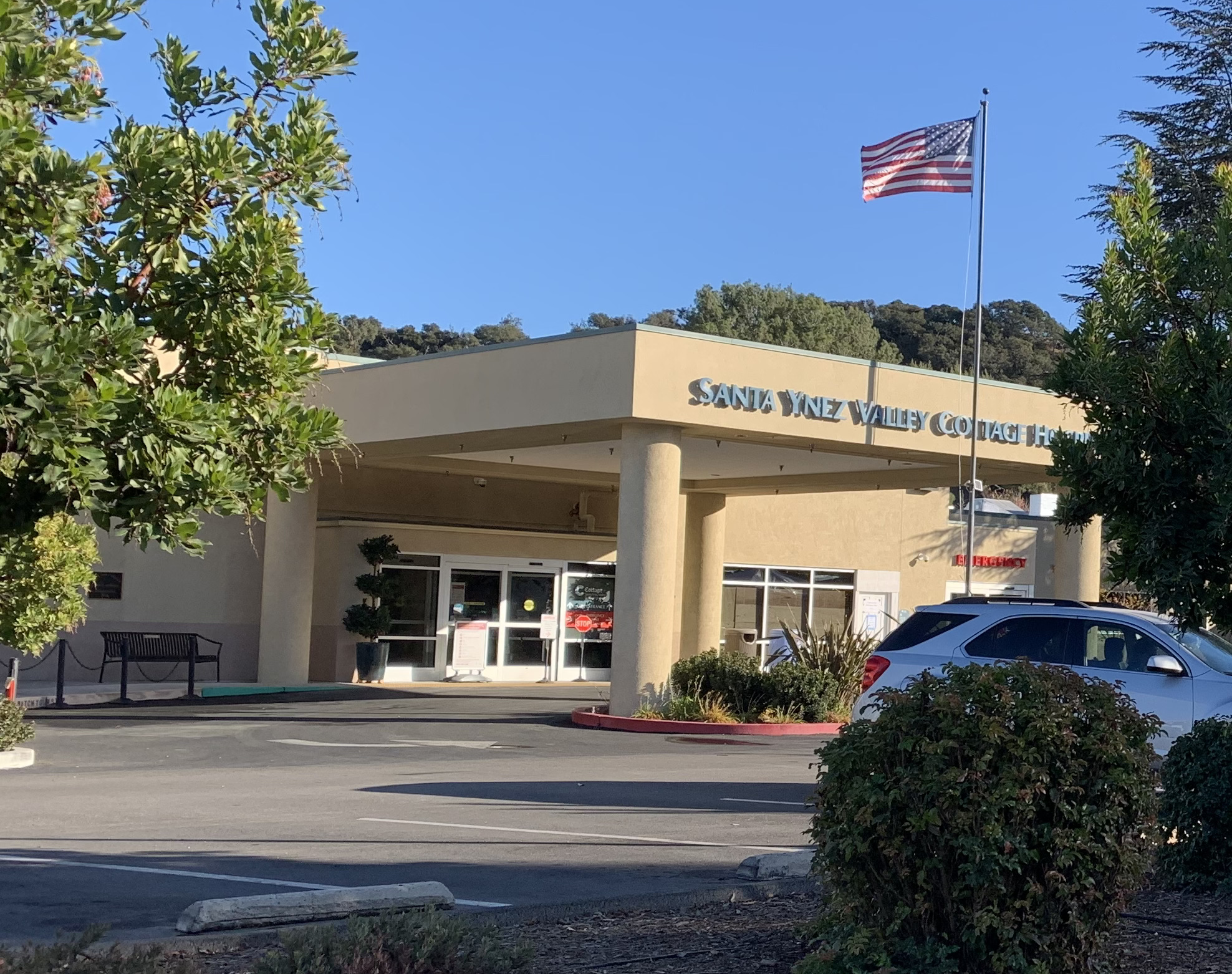

Geography
- Location: Solvang, California, Santa Barbara County, California, United States
- Coordinates: 34.60213°N 120.12627°W

Services
- Beds: 11

Helipads
- Helipad: No

History
- Founded: 1964

Links
- Website: www.cottagehealth.org/santa-ynez-valley-cottage-hospital/
- Lists: Hospitals in California

Santa Ynez Valley Cottage Hospital is a hospital in the city of Solvang, California. It is owned and operated by Cottage Health.

The hospital was featured briefly in a scene of the 2004 film Sideways.
