= Pacific Railroad Surveys =

Explorations of the American West, 1853–1855

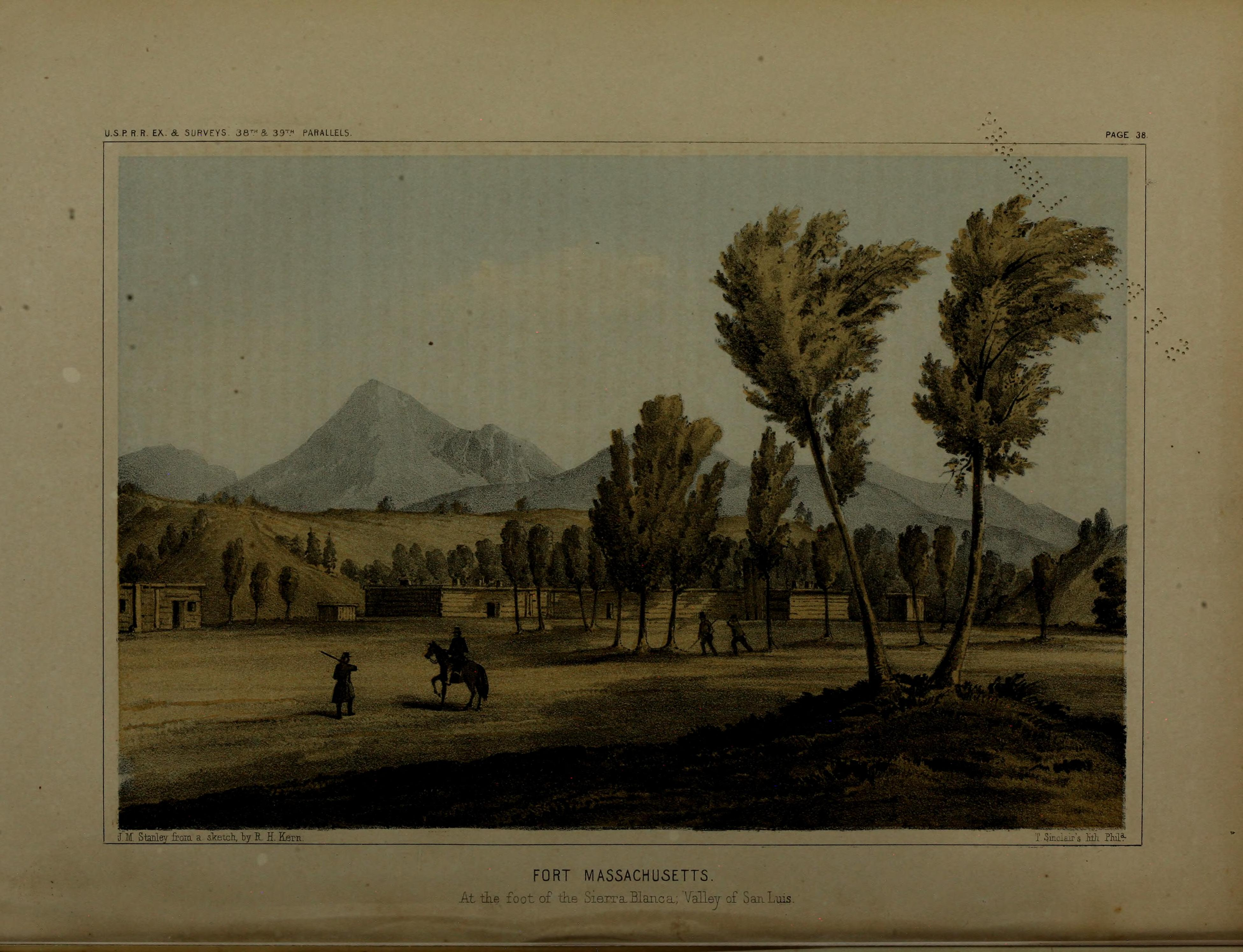
An illustration of Fort Massachusetts, Colorado, made during the surveys

The Pacific Railroad Surveys (1853–1855) were a series of explorations of the American West designed to find and document possible routes for a transcontinental railroad across North America. The expeditions included surveyors, scientists, and artists and resulted in an immense body of data covering at least 400,000 square miles (1,000,000 km^{2}) on the American West. "These volumes... constitute probably the most important single contemporary source of knowledge on Western geography and history and their value is greatly enhanced by the inclusion of many beautiful plates in color of scenery, native inhabitants, fauna and flora of the Western country." Published by the United States War Department from 1855 to 1860, the surveys contained significant material on natural history, including many illustrations of reptiles, amphibians, birds, and mammals. In addition to describing the route, these surveys also reported on the geology, zoology, botany, paleontology, climatology of the land as well as provided ethnographic descriptions of the Native peoples encountered during the surveys. Importantly, a map of routes for a railroad to the Pacific, was compiled to accompany the report.

== Background ==
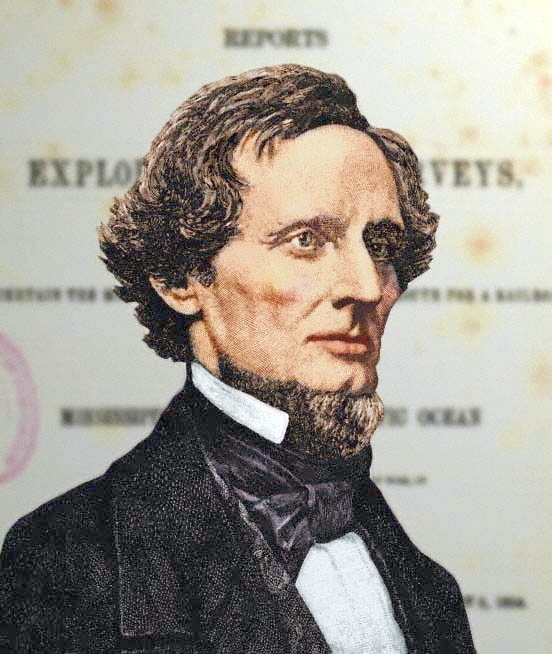
Exploration and surveys for the Pacific Railroad were carried out under the direction of Secretary of War Jefferson Davis

Starting in the late 18th and early 19th centuries, many Americans began a westward migration that would come to greatly influence the development of American history. However, water travel remained the most common and most efficient form of transit available. Soon, the development of the steam engine became an invaluable contribution to this westward expansion. As railroads gained popularity in the eastern United States during the 1830s, Americans felt an increased incentive to expand this new technology to the western frontier.

Beginning in the 1840s, several government sponsored expeditions hoped to find potential railroad routes across the west. However, no consensus route emerged due to the selfish economic motives of rival companies. In addition, cities and states competed for the route and terminus so no consensus was reached. Brigham Young, President of LDS Church, wrote, "We never went through the canyons or worked our way over the dividing ridges without asking where the rails could be laid." On March 3, 1853, Congress appropriated $150,000 and authorized Secretary of War Jefferson Davis “to Ascertain the Most Practical and Economical Route for a Railroad From the Mississippi River to the Pacific Ocean.” Davis ordered Brevet Captain George B. McClellan and the Corps of Topographical Engineers (TOPOGS), a division in the United States Army established to “discover, open up, and make accessible the American West,” to fulfill this obligation.

The most important concern for the United States Congress involved the location of where to build the railroad. With government involvement, lobbyists attempted to influence the selected locations because of the important social, political, and economic consequences. In addition, a transcontinental railroad would become a very costly endeavor. In fact, “Even the least expensive proposed routes would equal the federal budget for one year.” Despite these obstacles, a developing urgency clearly indicated the need for a transcontinental railroad. On August 16, 1856, Mr. Denver of the House Select Committee on the Pacific Railroad and Telegraph reported that: "the necessity that exists for constructing lines of railroad and telegraphic communication between the Atlantic and Pacific coasts of this continent is no longer a question for argument; it is conceded by every one."

The path of the first transcontinental railroad route was one of many proxy fights over the future of slavery in the United States exacerbated by capitulation and Mexican Cession resulting from the Treaty of Cahuenga and the Treaty of Guadalupe Hidalgo. The Compromise of 1850 which admitted California as a slave-free state, defined the geographical boundary of Texas as a slave state, banned the slave trade (but not slavery itself) in Washington, D.C., enhanced the Fugitive Slave Act, and most relevantly established Utah and New Mexico territories under popular sovereignty — meaning whether any future state from these territories would be free or slave would be decided by the constituency of migration at the time of the petition for statehood. The route of the first transcontinental railroad would determine whether slaves could be legally and efficiently trafficked into these geographically isolated territories. So the route was not just ancillary to free soil policy, but could ultimately affect the balance of power between the north and south in Congress when new states were inevitably admitted into the Union out of these regional territories. Just three years after this compromise, Jefferson Davis strongly influenced the Gadsden Purchase to facilitate his preferred southern route which was not viable over the Colorado Plateau. A year after this purchase, Bleeding Kansas began on account of identical thematic tensions. The Kansas–Nebraska Act was intended to open up new lands to develop and facilitate the construction of the transcontinental railroad, however it effectively repealed the Missouri Compromise of 1820. The map of the Pacific Railroad Surveys would be published in 1855.

The congressional inaction in the survey's aftermath is a reflection of the severity of this proxy fight. Despite the United States having common carrier railroad infrastructure since the 1830's, Congress was politically unable to enact any decision on an initial transcontinental railroad route until the south seceded from the Union in December 1860 in response to the November 6th presidential election. Contrasting national division along party lines on the issue, both major California political parties included a Pacific Railroad as part of their platform. That week and month, Theodore Judah, who himself had been engineering railroads since the 1840's, and California railroads in particular since the 1850's, finally obtained the political opportunity for a central route with Abraham Lincoln party associate and elector Leland Stanford. Slavery operative Jefferson Davis became President of the Confederate States of America. The Pony Express and then the first transcontinental telegraph were also initiated at this time out the urgency of the U.S. Civil War. Congress passed the first of the Pacific Railroad Acts and the major Homestead Act in 1862. The Central Pacific Railroad then broke ground on January 8, 1863. Though the last spike would not be driven into the transcontinental railroad until 1869, the second transatlantic telegraph cable was completed the year the Civil War ended.

== Five surveys ==
Five surveys were conducted.

- The Northern Pacific survey followed between the 47th parallel north and 49th parallel north from St. Paul, Minnesota to the Puget Sound and was led by the newly appointed governor of the Washington Territory, Isaac Stevens. Accompanying Stevens were Captain George B. McClellan with Lt. Sylvester Mowry out of the Columbia Barracks from the west and Lt. Rufus Saxton with Lt. Richard Arnold out of St. Marysville from the east.
- The Central Pacific survey followed between the 37th parallel north and 39th parallel north from St. Louis, Missouri to San Francisco, California. This survey was led by Lt. John W. Gunnison until his death by the Utes in Utah. Lt. Edward Griffin Beckwith then took command. Also participating in this survey was Frederick W. von Egloffstein, George Stoneman and Lt. Gouverneur K. Warren.
- There were two Southern Pacific surveys. One along the 35th parallel north from Oklahoma to Los Angeles, California, a route similar to the western part of the later Santa Fe Railroad and to Interstate 40, which was led by Lt. Amiel W. Whipple. The southernmost survey went across Texas to San Diego, California, a route which followed the Butterfield Overland Mail stagecoach trail where Southern Pacific RR completed the second transcontinental railway in 1881. This survey was led by Lt. John Parke and John Pope .
- The fifth survey was along the Pacific coast from San Diego to Seattle, Washington conducted by Lt. Robert S. Williamson and Parke.

== From surveys to construction ==
Although the Pacific Railroad Surveys (1853–1855) provided valuable information regarding the possible routes for the transcontinental railroad, they were not compelling enough to lead directly to construction. Three important trends also influenced Congress’ final decision. First, the California Gold Rush and the discovery of silver in Nevada led to a dramatic increase in population in the west. Second, the secession of the South from the Union during the beginnings of the American Civil War discounted southern politicians from interfering with a plan to build a northern or central route. Third, a growing population of railroad specialists allowed Congress several options to consider the most efficient and cost effective route to build a transcontinental railroad.

In particular, railroad engineer Theodore Judah, on 1 January 1857 in Washington, D.C., published "A practical plan for building The Pacific Railroad", in which he outlined the general plan and argued for the need to do a detailed instrumental survey of a specific selected route for the railroad, not a general reconnaissance of several possible routes that had been done in the Pacific Railroad Surveys. In winter 1859-1860, Judah was in Washington D.C. lobbying for a Pacific Railroad bill; California would hold a Pacific Railroad Convention in Sacramento on the first Monday that February. Judah returned to California by July, lobbied local newspapers for public support, and surveyed routes to at least three passes. After finding in Fall 1860 a practical trans-Sierra route from Sacramento over Donner Pass into the Great Basin of Nevada and after finding investors to incorporate the Central Pacific Railroad in June 1861, Judah was sent in October 1861 to Washington, D.C. to lobby for the Pacific Railway bill to aid in the construction of the first transcontinental railroad along his trans-Sierra route. The route followed much of the Stephens–Townsend–Murphy Party 1844 route and John C. Frémont's 1845-1846 third expedition route through the sierra crest made infamous by the Donner Party, rather than the Madeline Pass route mapped by the Pacific Railroad Surveys, or the intermediate Beckwourth Pass on account of political factors not included in the original surveys. The route followed a prior survey for a Donner Pass wagon toll road by Simon G. Elliott. Central Pacific Railroad entrepreneurs and engineers, including Charles Marsh, who made much of their prior fortunes facilitating the mining on the Mother Lode as well as the Comstock Lode, had been involved in the Henness Pass Turnpike Company and would later invest in the Dutch Flat and Donner Lake Wagon Road (DFDLWR) servicing Meadow Lake Mining District speculation in what would be popularly known as the "Dutch Flat Swindle" which politically threatened the timely completion of the railroad.

In 1862, Congress passed the Pacific Railway Act. The newly chartered Union Pacific Railroad Company would build continuous railroad and telegraph lines west from the Eastern shores of the Missouri River at Council Bluffs, Iowa (opposite Omaha, Nebraska) which would meet railroad and telegraph lines build east by the Central Pacific Railroad from the navigable waters of the Sacramento River in Sacramento, California. On May 10, 1869, the two rail lines joined with an honorary Golden Spike at Promontory Summit, Utah, after making a combined 1,774 miles (2,855 km) of railroad track.

== Natural history studies ==
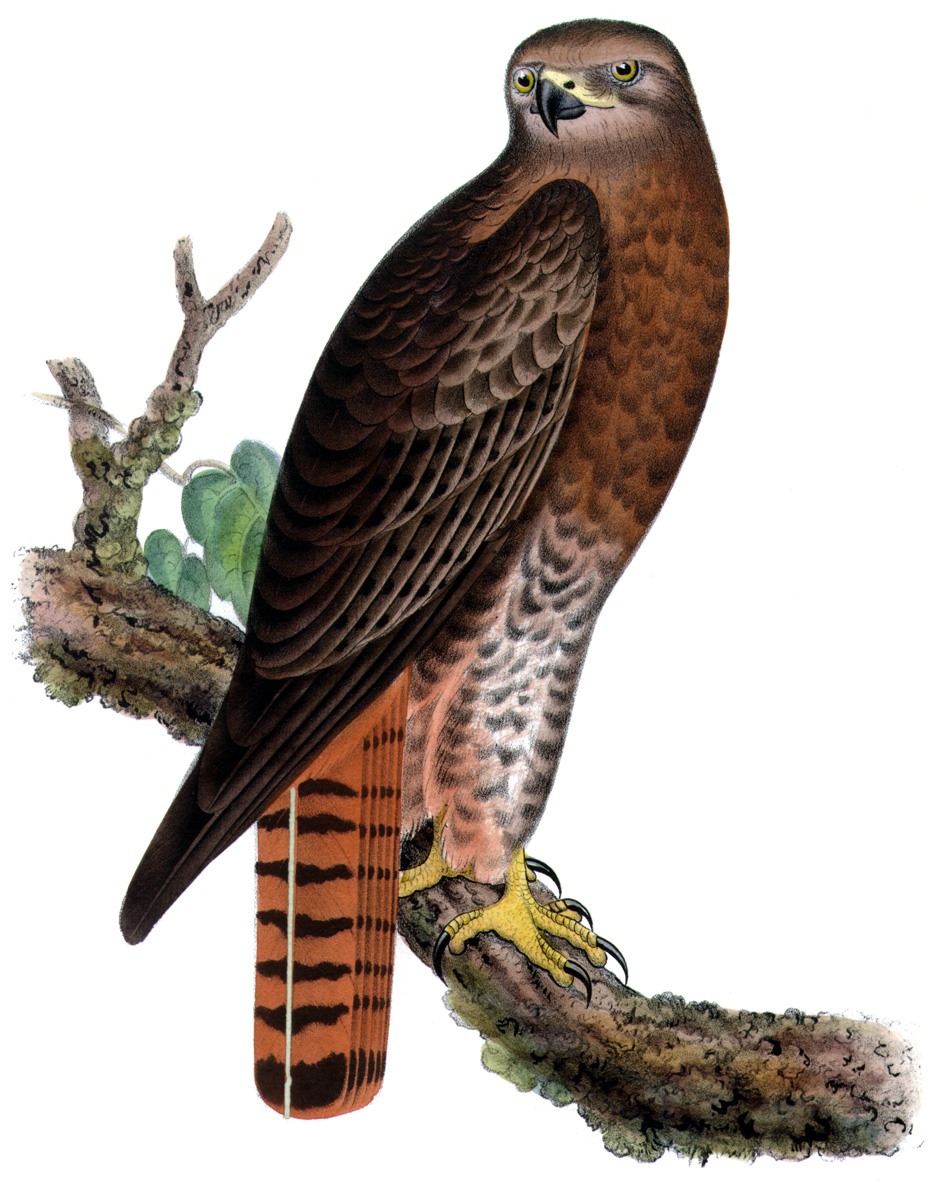
"Red-tailed Black Hawk" from volume X of the War Department's report to Congress

Leading naturalists were attached to all the survey parties:

- Dr. James G. Cooper served as naturalist for the western division, and Dr. George Suckley for the eastern division of the exploration of the Northern Pacific route.
- Botanist Frederick Creutzfeldt accompanied the exploring party of the Central Pacific route but was killed with Captain Gunnison in Utah.
- Dr. Adolphus L. Heermann and Dr. Edward Hallowell accompanied the Parke's exploration of the Southern Pacific Route.
- Dr. Caleb B. R. Kennerly accompanied the Whipple expedition on the southern route.
- Heermann accompanied Lt. Williamson on the expedition up the West Coast from Fort Yuma to San Francisco

Most of these men also served as the medical doctors for their exploring parties, and most were expert in only one or two areas of natural history. With limited time and expertise, their main charge was simply collection and preparation of plants and animals to be shipped back east for further study. They collected everything: plants, mammals, fish, insects, birds, mollusks, snakes, lizards, and turtles, both common and rare. This approach was described by geologist William P. Blake, who accompanied Lt. Parke's expedition:

The collections in this department of science were not restricted to what was new or undescribed, as I considered it quite as interesting to know that the flora of this region were the same as those common to other parts of the country, or that they were different. It was, therefore, established as a rule to collect everything; it being as easy at the conclusion of the survey to reject what was superfluous, as it would be difficult to replace what was wanting.

Plants and animals were preserved as well as could be in the expeditions' camps, and shipped overland back to the Smithsonian Institution and other centers of expertise for evaluation. This trip often required months of rugged travel, and not all the collections survived. Heermann, in a letter of transmittal to Lt. Parke, commented on these difficulties: "Of the reptiles, in which these countries are very rich, I had succeeded in forming quite a handsome collection, but unfortunately the cans in which they were contained became leaky, and possessing neither the means to correct this mishap, nor the alcohol to supply that wasted, they were all lost with the exception of a few specimens which I preserved in bottles."

Several of the expedition naturalists wrote reports on their areas of expertise which were included in the War Department's report to Congress. For example, Heermann wrote the report on birds, and Hallowell wrote the report on reptiles for Lt. Parke's exploration. Other leading naturalists contributed to the War Department's report by describing the collections returned from the exploring parties. These included Professor Asa Gray, Dr. John L. LeConte, William Cooper, Dr. Charles Girard, William G. Binney, and Dr. John S. Newberry. Most important of these was Spencer Fullerton Baird, who was at the time assistant secretary of the Smithsonian Institution. Baird not only wrote several sections of the report to Congress, but was responsible for many of the natural history illustrations. For example, the bird skins collected by the exploring parties were shipped to him. He had Smithsonian Institution artists produce engravings of the birds as they would appear in life, which were hand-tinted and included in the final report.

== See also ==
- Spencer Fullerton Baird
- United States and Mexican Boundary Survey
