= Central Pacific Railroad =

U.S. company that built western leg of the first transcontinental railroad

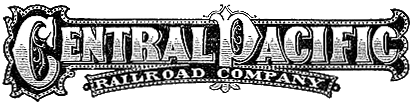

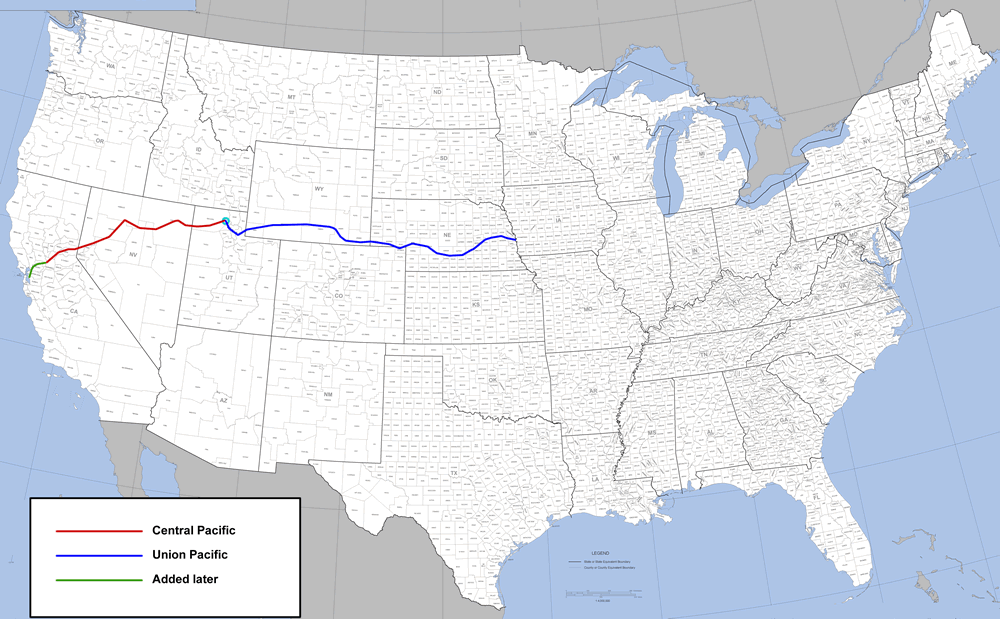
- Route of the First transcontinental railroad with the Central Pacific portion in red

Overview
- Headquarters: Sacramento, CA; San Francisco, California
- Founders: Charles Crocker; Mark Hopkins Jr.; Collis P. Huntington; Charles Marsh; Leland Stanford
- Locale: Sacramento, California-Ogden, Utah
- Dates of operation: June 28, 1861–April 1, 1885 continued as an SP leased line until June 30, 1959
- Successor: Southern Pacific

Technical
- Track gauge: 4 ft 8 1/2 in (1,435 mm) standard gauge

The Central Pacific Railroad (CPRR) was a rail company chartered by U.S. Congress in 1862 to build a railroad eastwards from Sacramento, California, to complete most of the western part of the "First transcontinental railroad" in North America. Incorporated in 1861, CPRR ceased independent operations in 1885 when the railroad was leased to the Southern Pacific Railroad Company. Its assets were formally merged into Southern Pacific in 1959.

Following the completion of the Pacific Railroad Surveys in 1855, several national proposals to build a transcontinental railroad failed because of political disputes over slavery. With the secession of the South in 1861, the modernizers in the Republican Party controlled the US Congress. They passed legislation in 1862 authorizing the central rail route with financing in the form of land grants and government railroad bond, which were all eventually repaid with interest. The government and the railroads both shared in the increased value of the land grants, which the railroads developed. The construction of the railroad also secured for the government the economical "safe and speedy transportation of the mails, troops, munitions of war, and public stores".

== History ==
=== Authorization and construction ===
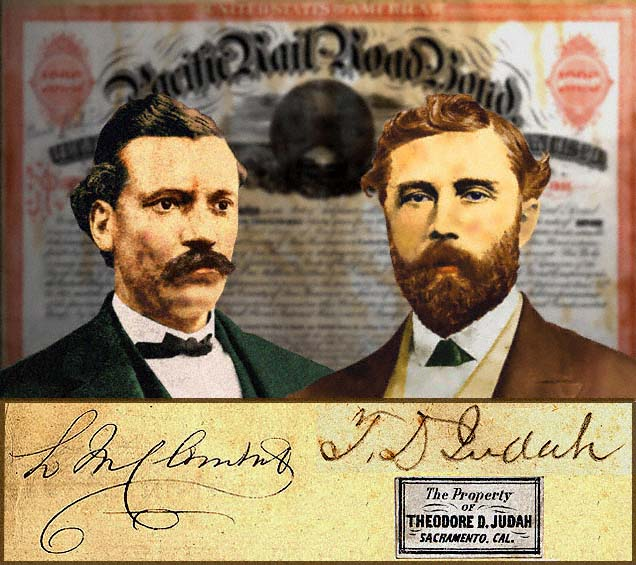
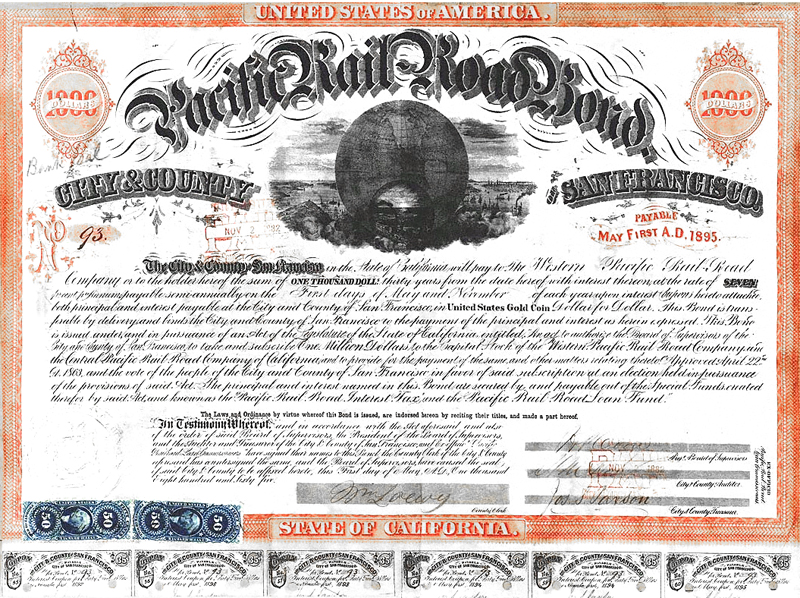
(Left): CPRR Original Chief Assistant Engineer L.M. Clement & Chief Engineer T.D. Judah; (right): 1865 San Francisco Pacific Railroad Bond approved in 1863 but delayed for two years by the opposition of the San Francisco Board of Supervisors

In the fall of 1860, Charles Marsh, a surveyor, civil engineer and water company owner, met with Theodore Judah, a civil engineer, who had recently built the Sacramento Valley Railroad from Sacramento to Folsom, California and was working on the California Central Railroad to extend the former from Folsom to Marysville. Marsh, who had already surveyed a potential railroad route between Sacramento and Nevada City, California, a decade earlier, went with Judah into the Sierra Nevada Mountains. There they examined the Henness Pass Turnpike Company's route (Marsh was a founding director of that company). They measured elevations and distances, and discussed the possibility of a transcontinental railroad. Both were convinced that it could be done.

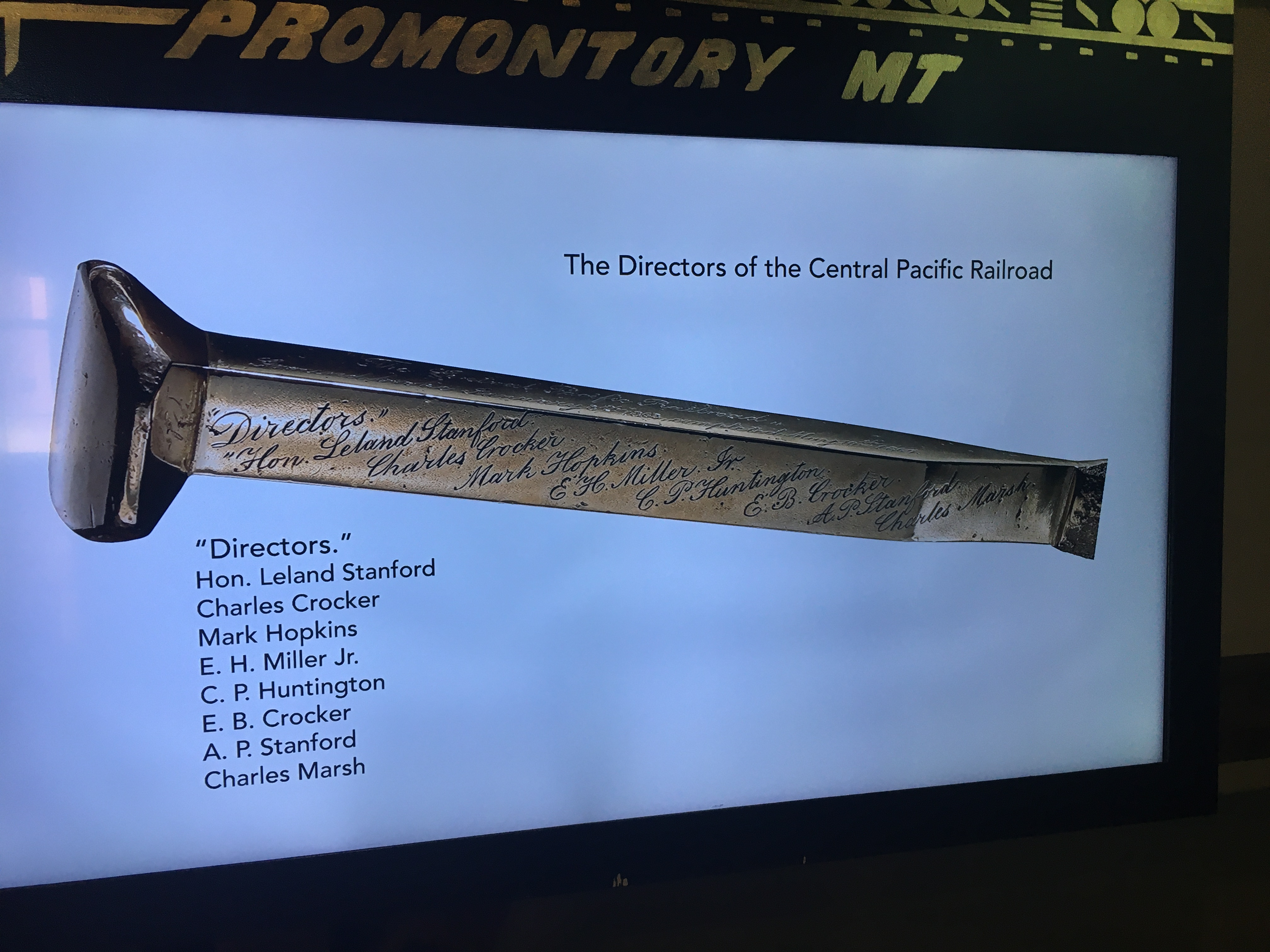
Gold Spike at the California State Railroad Museum, Sacramento, California. The museum also has a wall-sized painting of the Gold Spike ceremony which includes images of Charles Marsh and Leland Stanford (who were the only two Central Pacific directors to attend the Gold Spike ceremony at Promontory Summit, Utah).

In December 1860 or early January 1861, Marsh met with Judah and Daniel Strong in Strong's drug store in Dutch Flat, California, to discuss the project, which they called the Central Pacific Railroad of California. James Bailey, a friend of Judah, told Leland Stanford that Judah had a feasible route for a railroad across the Sierras, and urged Stanford to meet with Judah. In early 1861, Marsh, Judah and Strong met with Collis P. Huntington, Leland Stanford, Mark Hopkins Jr. and Charles Crocker to obtain financial backing. Papers were filed to incorporate the new company, and on April 30, 1861, the eight of them, along with Lucius Anson Booth, became the first board of directors of the Central Pacific Railroad.

Planned by Judah, the Central Pacific Railroad was promoted by Congress by the Pacific Railway Act of 1862 which authorized the issuance of government bonds and land grants for each mile that was constructed. Stanford served as president (at the same time he was elected governor of California), Huntington served as vice-president in charge of fundraising and purchasing, Hopkins was treasurer and Crocker was in charge of construction. They called themselves "The Associates", but became known as "The Big Four". Construction began in 1863 when the first rails were laid in Sacramento.

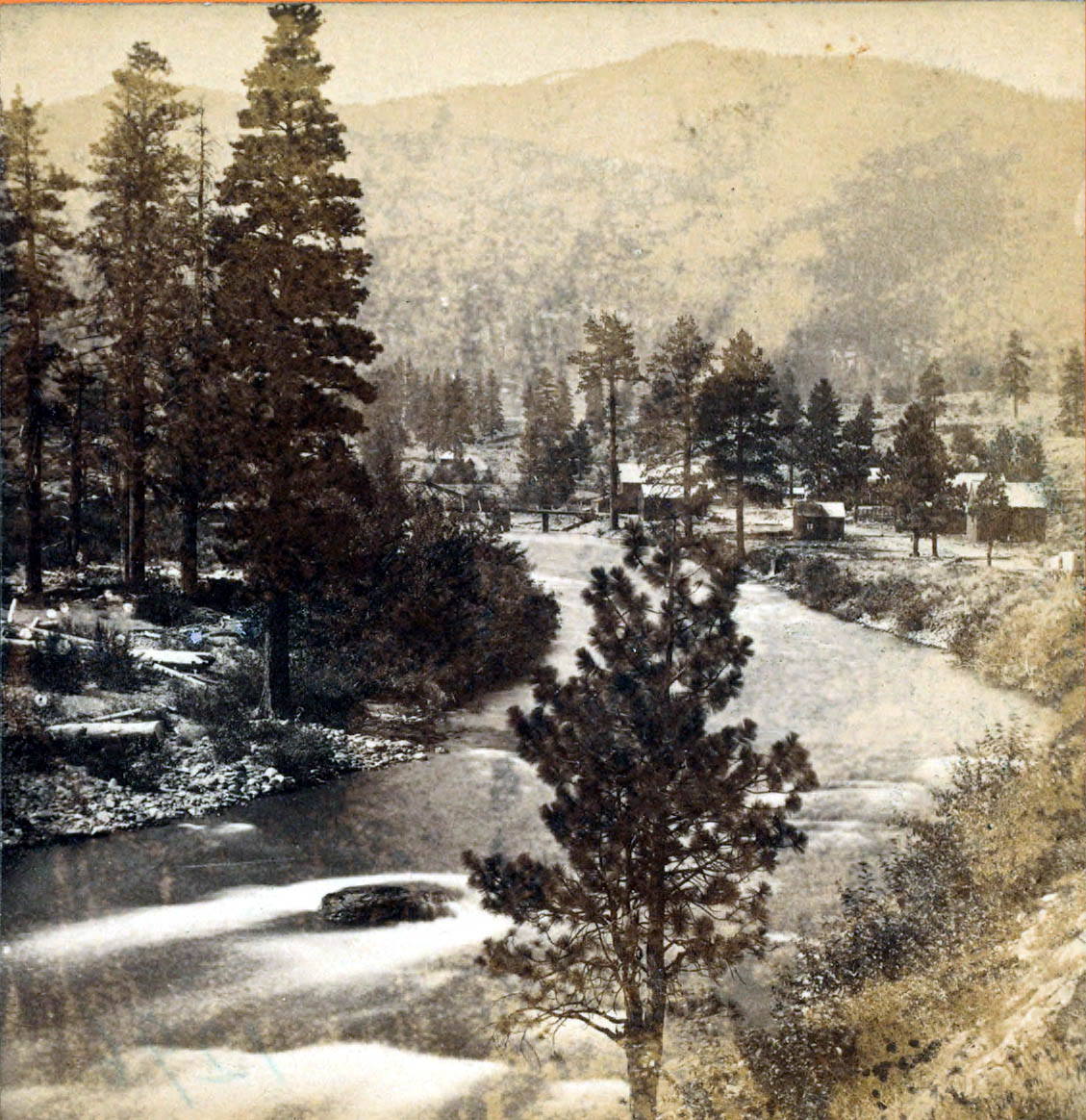
The Truckee River at Verdi, Nevada, c. 1868–75. When the Central Pacific Railroad reached its site in 1868, Charles Crocker pulled a slip of paper from a hat and read the name of Giuseppe Verdi; so, the town was named after the Italian opera composer.

Construction proceeded in earnest in 1865 when James Harvey Strobridge, the head of the construction work force, hired the first Cantonese emigrant workers at Crocker's suggestion. The construction crew grew to include 12,000 Chinese laborers by 1868, when they breached Donner summit and constituted eighty percent of the entire work force. The "Golden spike", connecting the western railroad to the Union Pacific Railroad at Promontory, Utah, was hammered on May 10, 1869. Coast-to-coast train travel in eight days became possible, replacing months-long sea voyages and lengthy, hazardous travel by wagon trains.

In 1885, the Central Pacific Railroad was acquired by the Southern Pacific Company as a leased line. Technically the CPRR remained a corporate entity until 1959, when it was formally merged into Southern Pacific. (It was reorganized in 1899 as the Central Pacific "Railway".) The original right-of-way is now controlled by the Union Pacific, which bought Southern Pacific in 1996.

The Union Pacific-Central Pacific (Southern Pacific) main line followed the historic Overland Route from Omaha, Nebraska, to San Francisco Bay.

Chinese labor was the most vital source for constructing the railroad. Most of the railroad workers in the west were Chinese, as they could be hired at a lower cost to do the difficult work. Fifty Cantonese emigrant workers were hired by the Central Pacific Railroad in February 1865 on a trial basis, and soon more and more Cantonese emigrants were hired. Working conditions were harsh, and Chinese were compensated less than their white counterparts, leading to far less white workers being hired. Chinese laborers were paid thirty-one dollars each month ($1,111 in 2025), and while white workers were paid the same, they were also given room and board. In time, CPRR came to see the advantage of good workers employed at low wages: "Chinese labor proved to be Central Pacific's salvation."

The difficulties faced by the Central Pacific in the Sierra Nevada – particularly the extensive tunneling required – were far more formidable than those encountered by the Union Pacific Railroad in the Rocky Mountains. The story that Chinese workers were suspended in wicker baskets over vertical granite cliffs at Cape Horn, California, to drill and blast a ledge for the Central Pacific has been repeated and exaggerated by uncritical historians.

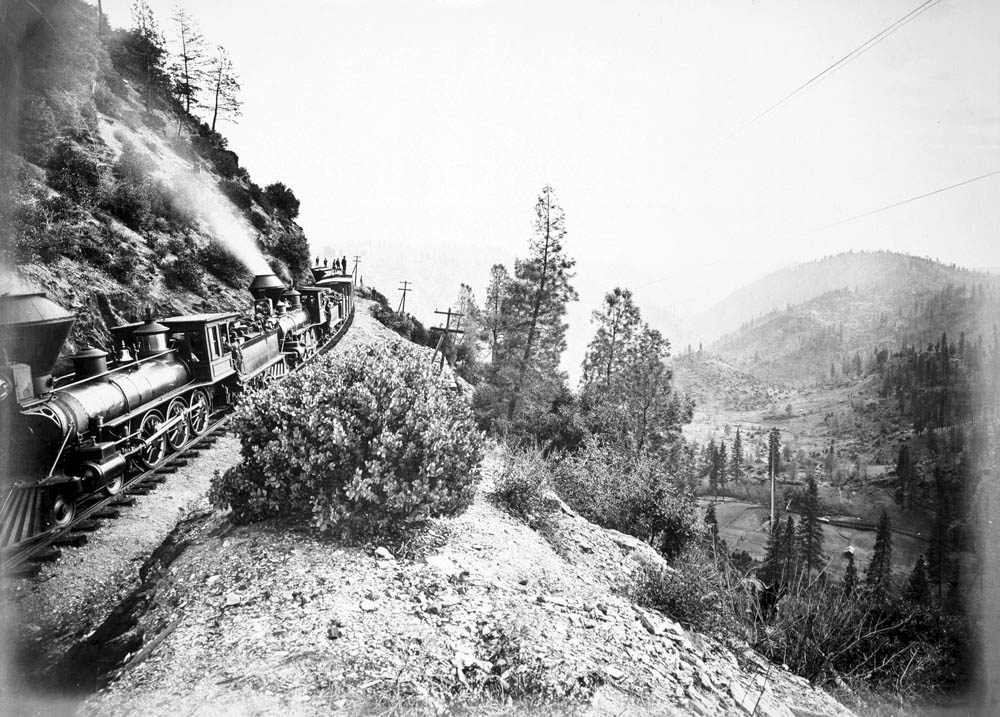
Cape Horn on the Central Pacific RR, c. 1876. Despite the frequently repeated myth of Chinese workers being blown to bits here while suspended in wicker baskets, it never happened. The cliff here isn't vertical, the rock isn't granite, and no one was lowered over the edge in wicker baskets to set dynamite charges. The cut was dug down from the top and from each end, not blasted from the side.

There is reliable, primary-source evidence stating that surveyors used safety ropes while staking out the route, but nothing about construction workers using ropes. Digging the cut was done downward from the top, and from each horizontal end of the cut. It is conceivable that a safety rope would have been useful when digging an initial footpath, that could then be enlarged into a shelf, but there was no reason to be suspended by ropes to dig or drill into the face of the cut. It wasn't done that way. And, most of the Chinese labor was not hired until later. So, the gangs that did the digging at Cape Horn may have been Irish.

Central Pacific Director Charles Marsh had extensive civil engineering experience in projects of this nature, both from planning an earlier proposed railroad into the Sierras, and from building ditches and flumes through those mountains for his water company.

=== Financing ===
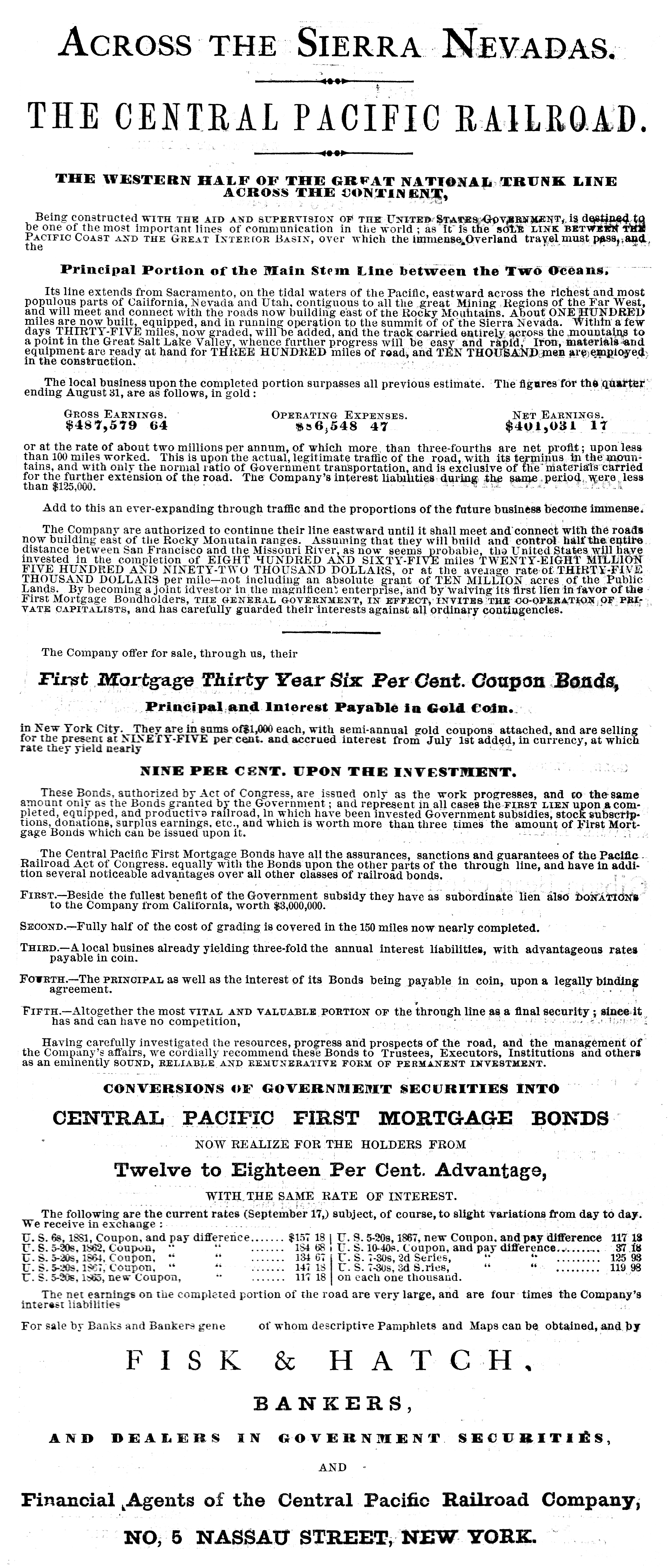
Advertisement for CPRR First Mortgage Bonds (1867)

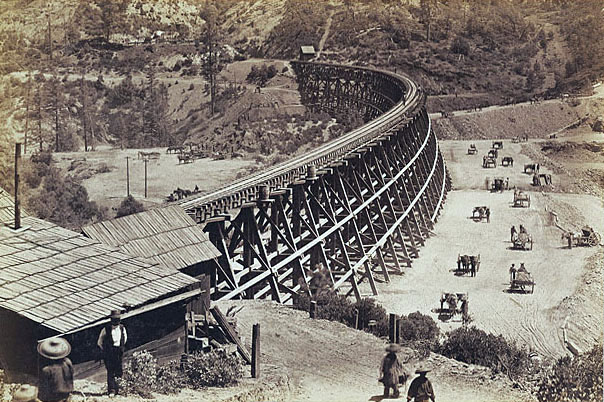
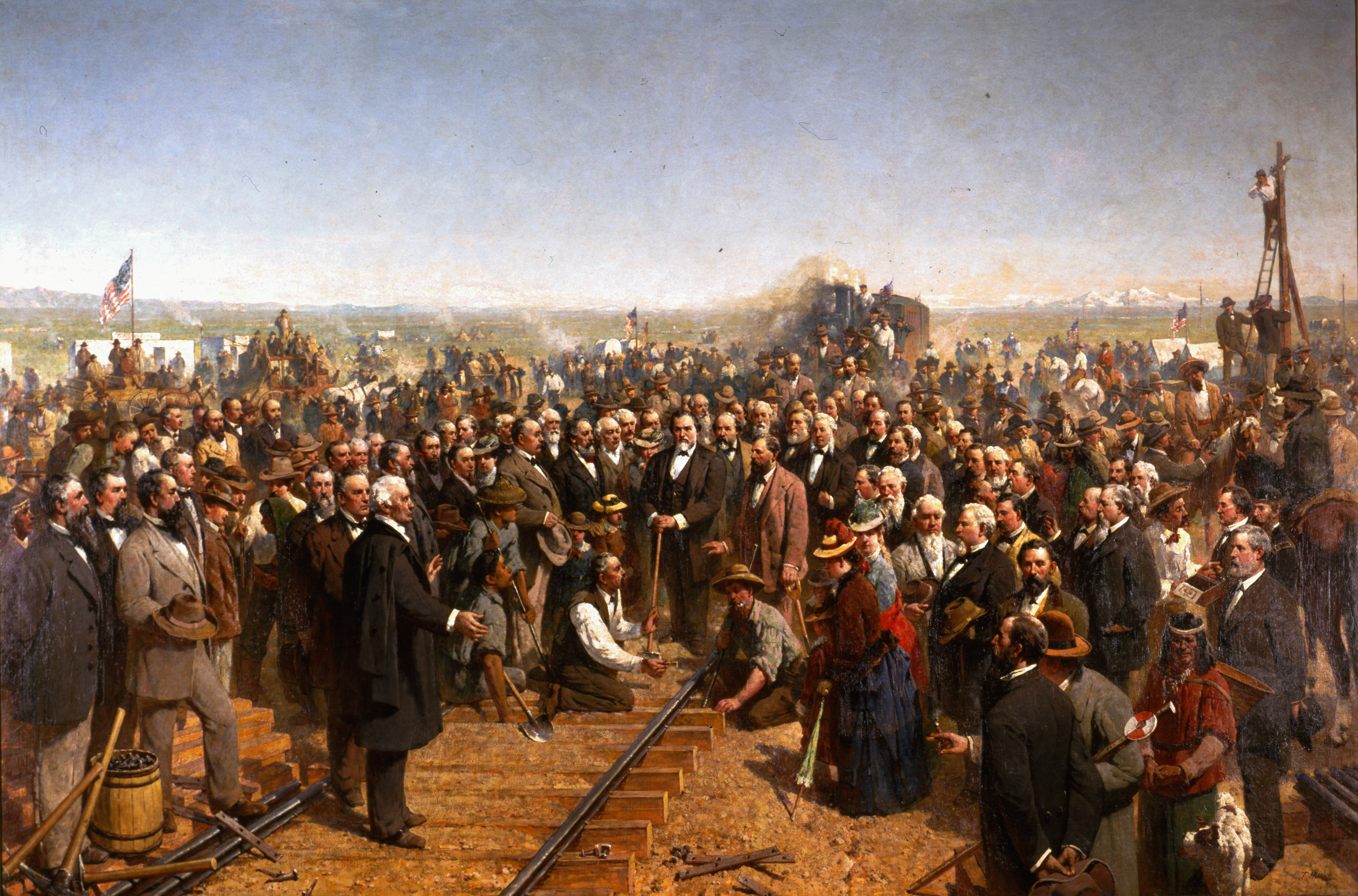
(Left): The Central Pacific built trestles initially in order to expedite construction of the railroad. Later, many of the trestles were filled in with dirt, such as this one near Secret Town, Placer County, California. Photo: Carleton Watkins (1876); (right): The Last Spike, painting by Thomas Hill (1881). Some of the Central Pacific officials depicted in the painting were not actually at the Gold Spike ceremony in Utah.

Construction of the road was financed primarily by 30-year, 6% U.S. government bonds authorized by Sec. 5 of the Pacific Railroad Act of 1862. They were issued at the rate of $16,000 ($265,000 in 2017 dollars) per mile of tracked grade completed east of the designated base of the Sierra Nevada range near Roseville, California, that state geologist Josiah Whitney had determined was the geologic start of the Sierras' foothills. Sec. 11 of the Act also provided that the issuance of bonds "shall be treble the number per mile" (to $48,000) for tracked grade completed over and within the two mountain ranges (but limited to a total of 300 miles (480 km) at this rate), and "doubled" (to $32,000) per mile of completed grade laid between the two mountain ranges. The U.S. Government Bonds, which constituted a lien upon the railroads and all their fixtures, were repaid in full (and with interest) by the company as and when they became due.

Sec. 10 of the 1864 amending Pacific Railroad Act (13 Statutes at Large, 356) additionally authorized the company to issue its own "First Mortgage Bonds" in total amounts up to (but not exceeding) that of the bonds issued by the United States. Such company-issued securities had priority over the original Government Bonds. (Local and state governments also aided the financing, although the City and County of San Francisco did not do so willingly. This materially slowed early construction efforts.) Sec. 3 of the 1862 Act granted the railroads 10 square miles (26 km^{2}) of public land for every mile laid, except where railroads ran through cities and crossed rivers. This grant was apportioned in 5 sections on alternating sides of the railroad, with each section measuring 0.2 miles (320 m) by 10 miles (16 km). These grants were later doubled to 20 square miles (52 km^{2}) per mile of grade by the 1864 Act.

Although the Pacific Railroad eventually benefited the Bay Area, the City and County of San Francisco obstructed financing it during the early years of 1863–1865. When Stanford was Governor of California, the Legislature passed on April 22, 1863, "An Act to Authorize the Board of Supervisors of the City and County of San Francisco to take and subscribe One Million Dollars to the Capital Stock of the Western Pacific Rail Road Company and the Central Pacific Rail Road Company of California and to provide for the payment of the same and other matters relating thereto" (which was later amended by Section Five of the "Compromise Act" of April 4, 1864). On May 19, 1863, the electors of the City and County of San Francisco passed this bond by a vote of 6,329 to 3,116, in a highly controversial Special Election.

The City and County's financing of the investment through the issuance and delivery of Bonds was delayed for two years, when Mayor Henry P. Coon, and the County Clerk, Wilhelm Loewy, each refused to countersign the Bonds. It took legal actions to force them to do so: in 1864 the Supreme Court of the State of California ordered them under Writs of Mandamus (The People of the State of California ex rel the Central Pacific Railroad Company vs. Henry P. Coon, Mayor; Henry M. Hale, Auditor; and Joseph S. Paxson, Treasurer, of the City and County of San Francisco. 25 Cal. 635) and in 1865, a legal judgment against Loewy (The People ex rel The Central Pacific Railroad Company of California vs. The Board of Supervisors of the City and County of San Francisco, and Wilhelm Lowey, Clerk 27 Cal. 655) directing that the Bonds be countersigned and delivered.

In 1863 the State legislature's forcing of City and County action became known as the "Dutch Flat Swindle". Critics claimed the CPRR's Big Four intended to build a railroad only as far as Dutch Flat, California, to connect to the Dutch Flat-Donner Pass Wagon Road to monopolize the lucrative mining traffic, and not push the track east of Dutch Flat into the more challenging and expensive High Sierra effort. CPRR's chief engineer, Theodore Judah, also argued against such a road and hence against the Big Four, fearing that its construction would siphon money from CPRR's paramount trans-Sierra railroad effort. Despite Judah's strong objection, the Big Four incorporated in August 1863 the Dutch Flat-Donner Lake Wagon Road Company. Frustrated, Judah headed off for New York via Panama to raise funds to buy out the Big Four from CPRR and build his trans-Sierra railroad. Unfortunately, Judah contracted yellow fever in Panama and died in New York in November 1863.

== Museums and archives ==
A replica of the Sacramento, California, Central Pacific Railroad passenger station is part of the California State Railroad Museum, located in the Old Sacramento State Historic Park.

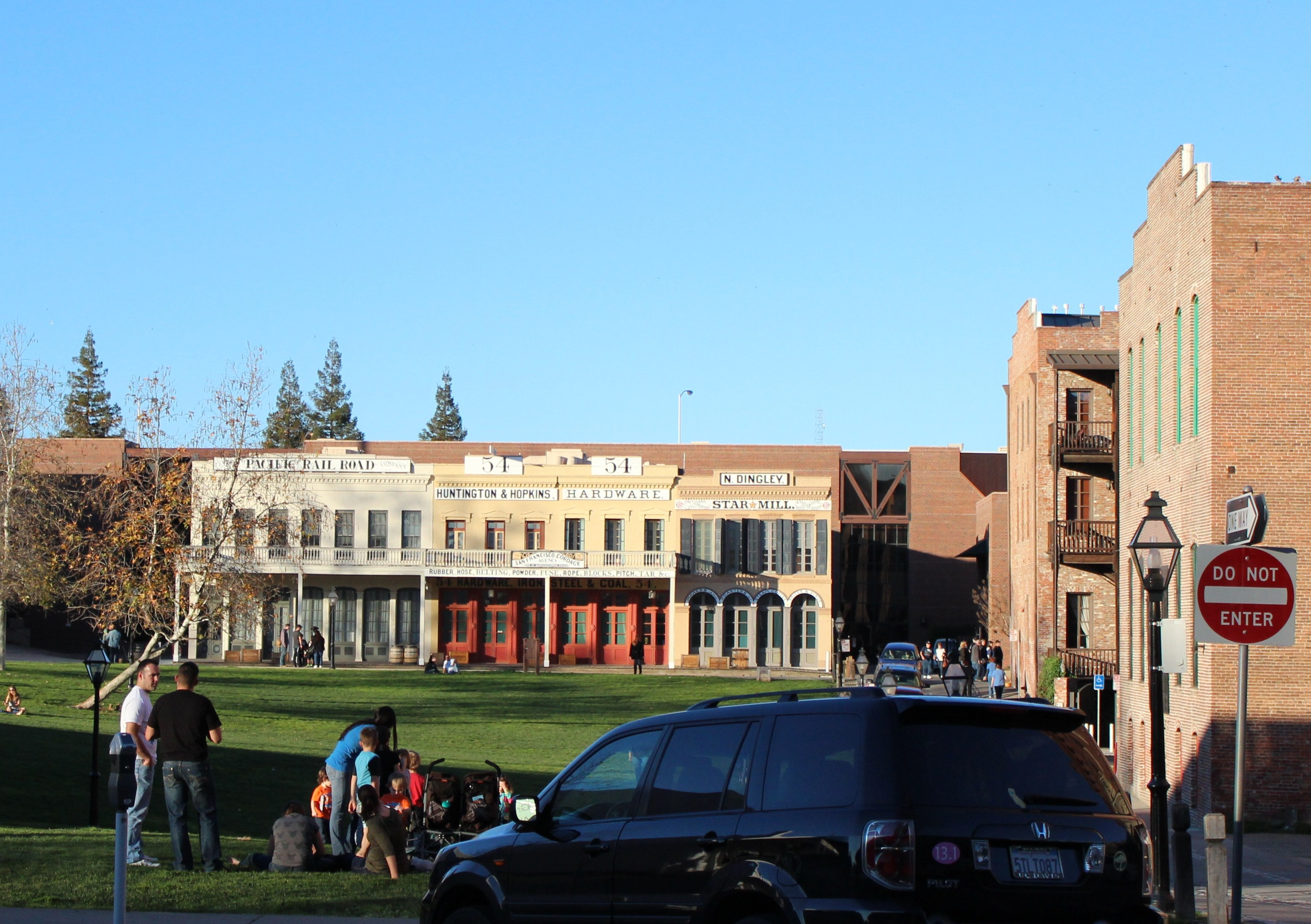
The reconstructed hardware store of Collis P. Huntington and Mark Hopkins is one of many buildings in Old Sacramento State Historic Park that relate to the Central Pacific RR and its beginnings. Old Sacramento also is the home to the California State Railroad Museum, a monument to Theodore Dehone Judah, Central Pacific RR milepost zero, Delta King steamboat, the Central Pacific depot and numerous other historic buildings.

Most of Collis P. Huntington's correspondence is preserved at Syracuse University, as part of the Collis Huntington Papers collection. It has been released on microfilm (133 reels) and is available at numerous other academic institutions across the country. Additional collections of manuscript letters are held at Stanford University and the Mariners' Museum at Newport News, Virginia. Alfred A. Hart was the official photographer of the CPRR construction.

== Locomotives ==
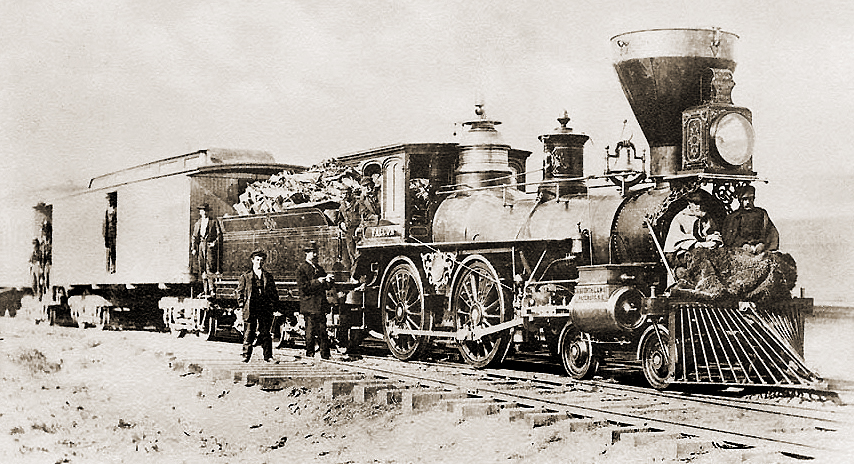
CPRR #113 Falcon, a Danforth 4–4–0, at Argenta, Nevada, March 1, 1869 (photo: J.B. Silvis)

The Central Pacific's first three locomotives were of the then common 4-4-0 type, although with the American Civil War raging in the east, they had difficulty acquiring engines from eastern builders, who at times only had smaller 4-2-4 or 4-2-2 types available. Until the completion of the Transcontinental rail link and the railroad's opening of its own shops, all locomotives had to be purchased from builders in the northeastern U.S. The engines had to be dismantled, loaded on a ship, which would embark on a four-month journey that went around South America's Cape Horn until arriving in Sacramento where the locomotives would be unloaded, re-assembled, and placed in service.

Locomotives at the time came from many manufacturers, such as Cooke, Schenectady, Mason, Rogers, Danforth, Norris, Booth, and McKay & Aldus, among others. The railroad had been on rather unfriendly terms with the Baldwin Locomotive Works, one of the more well-known firms. It is not clear as to the cause of this dispute, though some attribute it to the builder insisting on cash payment (though this has yet to be verified). Consequently, the railroad refused to buy engines from Baldwin, and three former Western Pacific Railroad (which the CP had absorbed in 1870) engines were the only Baldwin engines owned by the Central Pacific. The Central Pacific's dispute with Baldwin remained unresolved until well after the road had been acquired by the Southern Pacific.

In the 1870s, the road opened up its own locomotive construction facilities in Sacramento. Central Pacific's 173 was rebuilt by these shops and served as the basis for CP's engine construction. The locomotives built before the 1870s were given names as well as numbers. By the 1870s, it was decided to eliminate the names and as each engine was sent to the shops for service, their names would be removed. However, one engine that was built in the 1880s did receive a name: the El Gobernador.

== Preserved locomotives ==
The following CP engines have been preserved:

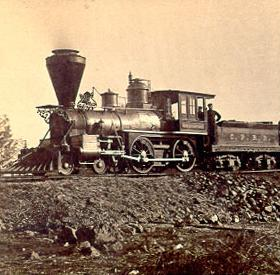
The Gov. Stanford locomotive, one of the locomotives preserved

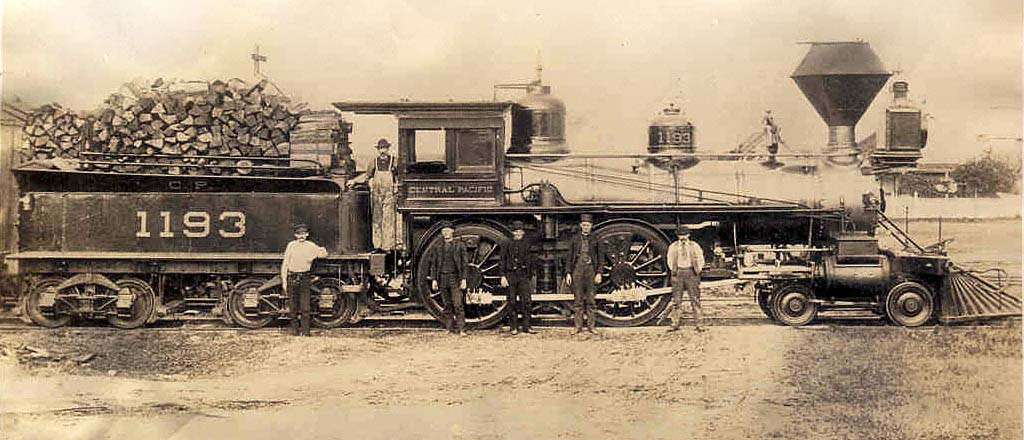
Central Pacific #31 (later, Stockton Terminal & Eastern #1), now preserved at Travel Town Museum.

- Central Pacific 1, Gov. Stanford
- CP 233, a 2-6-2T the railroad had built, is stored at the California State Railroad Museum.
- Central Pacific 3, C. P. Huntington, later purchased by the Southern Pacific Transportation Company.
- Former Western Pacific Mariposa, Central Pacific's second number 31. Built in 1864, it helped build the first transcontinental railroad, and later was sold to Stockton Terminal and Eastern in 1914 and renumbered 1. Currently at the Travel Town Museum in Los Angeles.
- Virginia and Truckee 18 Dayton was built for the Virginia and Truckee Railroad and never served on the Central Pacific, but the engine was one of two locomotives built by the CP's Sacramento shops in preservation (the other being CP 233). Moreover, its specifications were derived from CP 173, and thus is the only surviving example of that engine's design.
- Central Pacific's numbers 60 Jupiter, and 63 Leviathan. Although both engines have been scrapped, and therefore technically do not count as having been preserved, there are exact, full-size operating replicas built in recent years. The Jupiter was built for the National Park Service along with a replica of Union Pacific's 119 for use at the Golden Spike National Historical Park. Leviathan was finished in 2009, and was privately owned, traveling to various railroads to operate, until sold in 2018 to Stone Gable Estates of Elizabethtown, Pennsylvania. Stone Gable relettered the locomotive as Pennsylvania Railroad No. 331, a now-scrapped steam locomotive that pulled Abraham Lincoln's funeral train, and operates on the estate's Harrisburg, Lincoln and Lancaster Railroad.

== Timeline ==
1861

- June 28, 1861: "Central Pacific Rail Road of California" incorporated; name changed to "Central Pacific Railroad of California" on October 8, 1864, after the Pacific Railway Act amendment passes that summer.

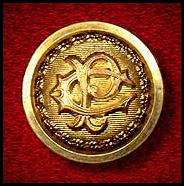
CPRR logo gilded "Staff" uniform button

1862

- July 1, 1862: President Lincoln signs the Pacific Railway Act, which authorized the Central Pacific and the Union Pacific to build a railroad to the Pacific Ocean.

1863

- January 8, 1863: Ground-breaking ceremonies take place at Sacramento, California, at the foot of "K" Street at the waterfront of the Sacramento River.
- October 26, 1863: First rail of the Pacific Railroad laid at Sacramento.

1864

- April 26, 1864: Central Pacific opened to Roseville, 18 miles (29 km), where it makes a junction with the California Central Railroad, operating from Folsom north to Lincoln.
- June 3, 1864: The first revenue train on the Central Pacific operates between Sacramento and Newcastle, California
- October 8, 1864: Following passage of the amendment to the Pacific Railroad Act, the company's name is changed to "Central Pacific Railroad of California", a new corporation.

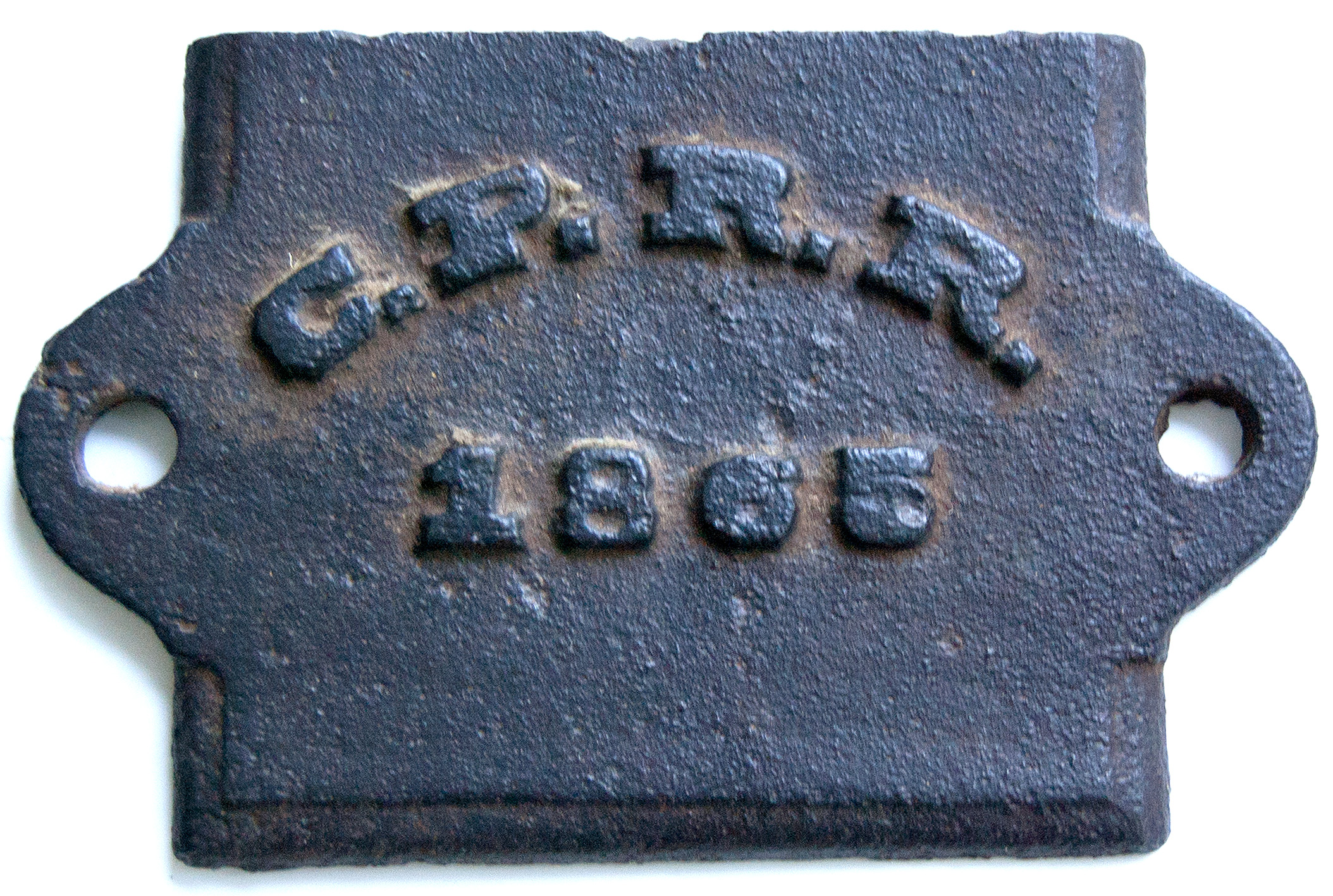
1865 CPRR journal cover

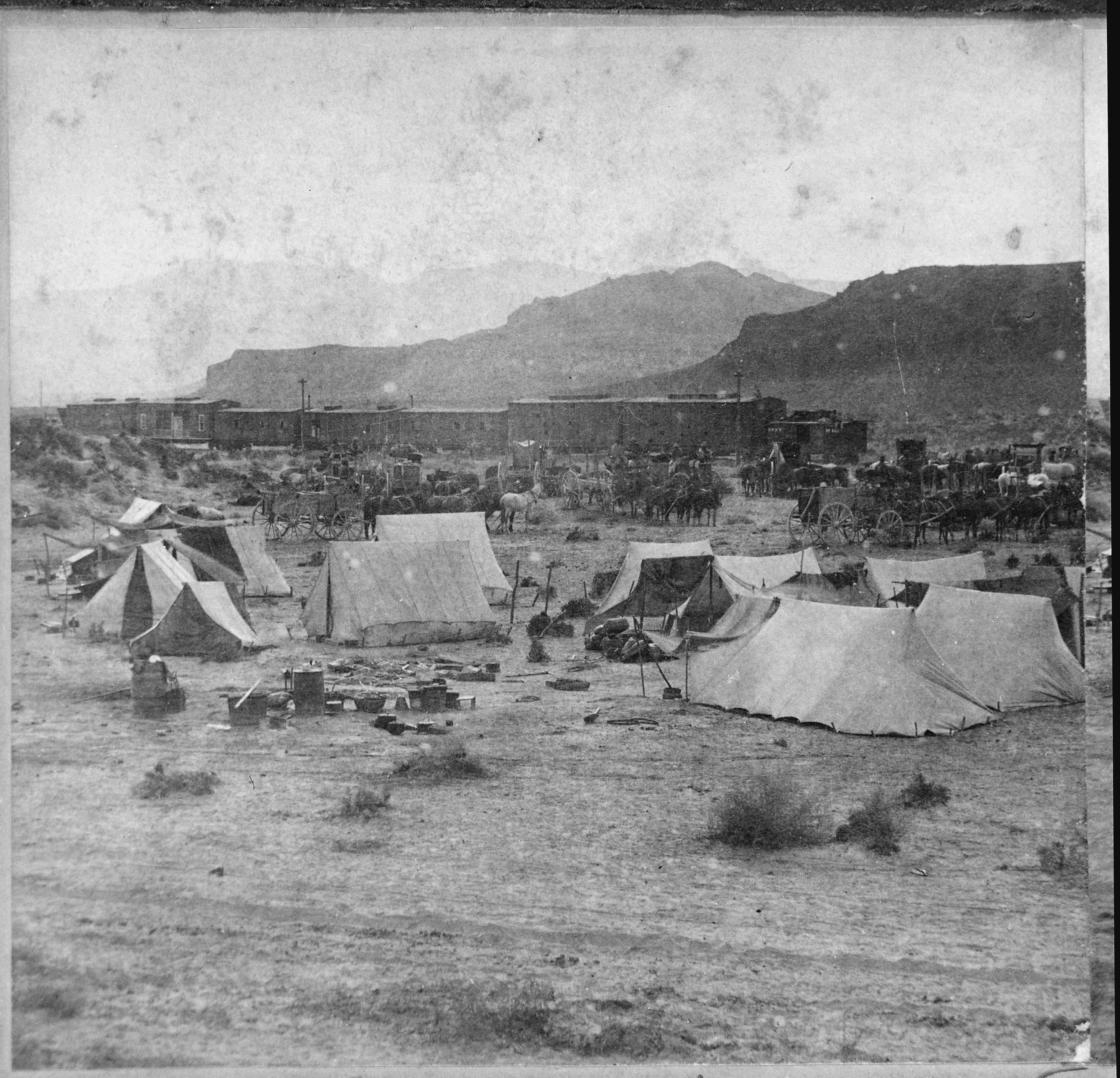
End of the track near Humboldt River Canyon, Nevada, 1868

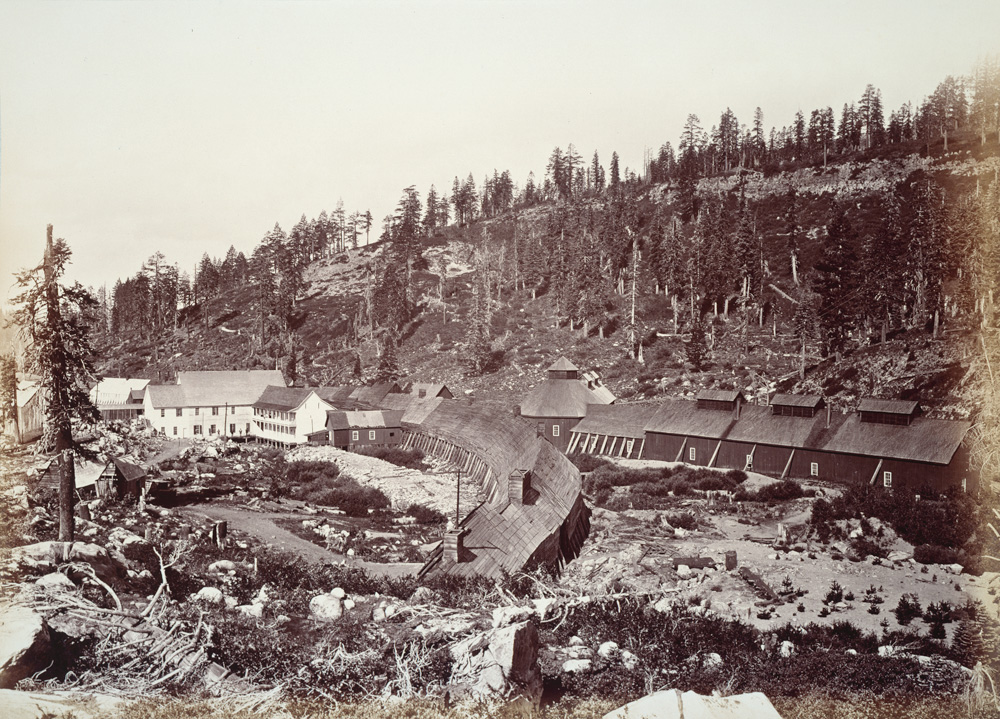
Summit station at Sierra Nevada

1865

- February 1865: Central Pacific hired its first 50 Cantonese emigrant laborers on a trial basis.
- May 13, 1865: Central Pacific opened 36 miles (58 km) to Auburn, California.
- September 1, 1865: Central Pacific opened 54 miles (87 km) to Colfax, California (formerly known as "Illinoistown".)

1866

- December 3, 1866: Central Pacific opened 92 miles (148 km) to Cisco, California.

1867

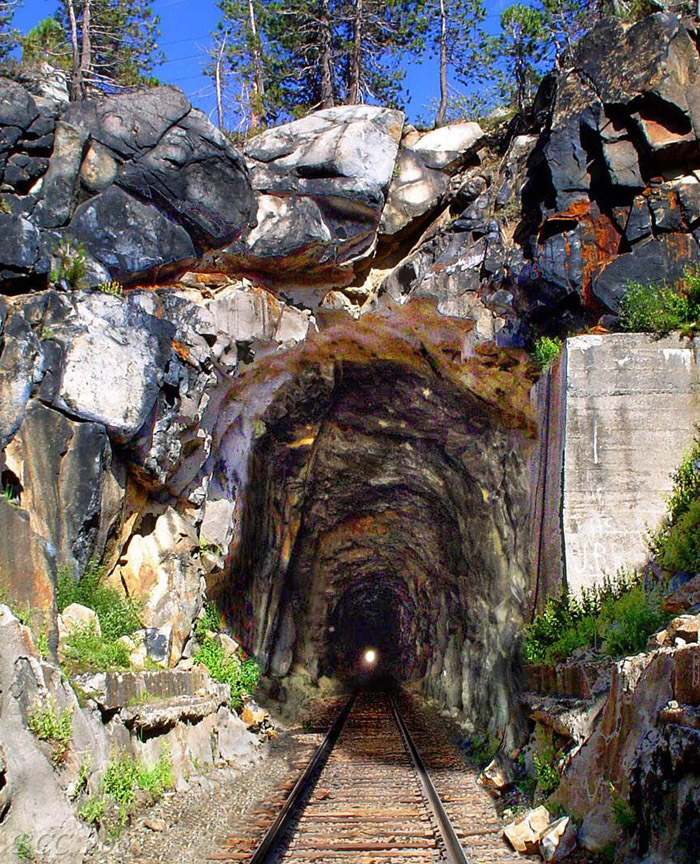
Summit Tunnel, West Portal (Composite image with the tracks removed in 1993 digitally restored)

- June 25, 1867: 5,000 Chinese railroad workers went on strike in protest against the longer hours and wage inequality they were facing.
- August 28, 1867: The Sierra Nevadas were finally "conquered" by the Central Pacific Railroad, after almost five years of sustained construction effort by its mainly Chinese crew about 10,000 strong, with the successful completion at Donner Pass of its 1,659-foot (506 m) Tunnel No. 6 (a.k.a. the "Summit Tunnel").
- December 1, 1867: Central Pacific opened to Summit of the Sierra Nevada, 105 miles (169 km).

1868

- June 18, 1868: The first passenger train crosses the Sierra Nevada to Lake's Crossing (modern day Reno, Nevada) at the eastern foot of the Sierra in Nevada.

1869

- April 28, 1869: Track crews on the Central Pacific lay 10 miles (16 km) of track in one day. To date, this is the longest stretch of track to have been built in one day.
- May 10, 1869: The Central Pacific and Union Pacific tracks meet in Promontory, Utah, connecting Omaha, Nebraska with Sacramento, California.
- May 15, 1869: The first transcontinental trains are run over the new line to Sacramento, California.
- September 6, 1869: The first transcontinental train reaches the San Francisco Bay at Alameda Terminal, achieving the first Pacific Railroad from the Missouri river to the Pacific Ocean.
- November 8, 1869: Central Pacific subsidiaries, Western Pacific Railroad (1862–1870) and San Francisco and Oakland Railroad, complete the final leg of the route, connecting Omaha, Nebraska to Oakland, California.

1870

- June 23, 1870: Central Pacific is consolidated with the Western Pacific Railroad (1862–1870), San Francisco and Alameda Railroad and San Francisco and Oakland Railroad to form the "Central Pacific Railroad Co." (of June 1870).
- August 22, 1870: Central Pacific Railroad Co. is consolidated with the California & Oregon; San Francisco, Oakland & Alameda; and San Joaquin Valley Railroad; to form the "Central Pacific Railroad Co.", a new corporation.

1876

- April 30, 1876: Operates the California Pacific Railroad between South Vallejo and Sacramento, Calistoga and Marysville until April 1, 1885 (see below).

1877

- July 16, 1877: Start of the Great railroad strike of 1877 when railroad workers on strike in Martinsburg, West Virginia, derail and loot a train; United States President Rutherford B. Hayes calls in Federal troops to break the strike.

1883

- November 18, 1883: A system of one-hour standard time zones for American railroads was first implemented. The zones were named Intercolonial, Eastern, Central, Mountain, and Pacific. Within one year, 85% of all cities having populations over 10,000, about 200 cities in total, were using standard time.

1885

- April 1, 1885: Central Pacific is leased to Southern Pacific.

1888

- June 30, 1888: Listed by ICC as a "non-operating" subsidiary of Southern Pacific.

1899

- July 29, 1899: Central Pacific is reorganized as the "Central Pacific Railway".

1959

- June 30, 1959: Central Pacific is formally merged into the Southern Pacific.

== Acquisitions ==
- San Joaquin Valley Railroad (1868–1870)
- Stockton and Copperopolis Railroad
- Stockton and Visalia Railroad
- Western Pacific Railroad (1862–1870)

== See also ==
- Rail transport in California
- Donner Pass (Sierra Nevada)
