= Snow Tent, California =

Snow Tent
- Former settlement
- Location in California
- Coordinates: 39°23′45″N 120°51′28″W
- Country: United States
- State: California
- County: Nevada County
- Elevation: 4,583 ft (1,397 m)

Population (1880)
  - Total: 25
- Time zone: UTC-8 (Pacific (PST))
  - Summer (DST): UTC-7 (PDT)

Snow Tent was a historic settlement in Nevada County, California. The name derives from a tent set up by the first resident in 1850. Snow Tent grew into a gold mining and lumbering center, then vanished sometime after 1880.

Located in what is today the Tahoe National Forest, the Snow Tent site is on the San Juan Ridge roughly midway between North Bloomfield and Graniteville, about 16 miles northeast of Nevada City.

Snow Tent was situated near the intersection of what are Snow Tent Road and the N. Bloomfield-Graniteville Road. It was an important stop on one of the routes through Henness Pass. It still appeared on maps as of 1902.

== Mining ==
Snow Tent lies on a rich bed of gold bearing gravel which runs from the San Juan Ridge in a southwesterly direction towards Hunt's Hill, You Bet, Dutch Flat and into Placer County. Snow Tent was the site of both hydraulic and hard rock mining. It is not clear how extensive hydraulic mining was since it does not appear from Hartwell's 1880 map that any ditch brought water to Snow Tent.

Hydraulic mining on the Ridge received a major blow from the 1884 Sawyer decision, which prohibited the discharge of tailings into the Yuba River. Hard rock or quartz mining in the area began in the 1850s and continued for some time, with occasional reports of new strikes.

== Lumbering ==
Mining required a lot of wood and Snow Tent lay amid rich pine forests. Snow Tent's principal saw mill was owned by James Churchill. Constructed in the early 1850s, it burned down in 1857, reportedly of arson, with a loss of $8000 (~$211,781 in 2024). Mr. Churchill rebuilt the mill, and it burned again with a loss estimated at $40,000. He rebuilt it again and it finally burned down for good in 1875, again reportedly of arson with a loss of $4000 (~$103,702 in 2024). In the early 20th century, the Landsburgh brothers operated a sawmill in the area.

== Stage Stop ==
Snow Tent was an important stop on the route between Marysville, Nevada City and the territory that would become the state of Nevada. As early as 1851, stagecoaches and freight wagons regularly operated on this route. Snow Tent's best known institution was its hotel, sometimes known as Snow Tent House, and operated for some years by Mr. L. A. Sackett. It was put up for sale in 1864 with this advertisement.

Snow Tent Ad

The hotel burned down in 1866, from an accidental chimney fire.

== Life in Snow Tent ==
Snow Tent dates from the spring of 1850, when Michael Angelo Singleton, a native of Louisiana, erected a canvas tent from which he sold goods and mined, and which was snowbound during winter.

Beginning in 1851, Snow Tent had a general store operated by Furman, McIntyre & Co. It also had a livery stable attached to the hotel. It does not appear to have had a school, church or post office, commonly found in mining camps in that region. By 1880, its population was reduced to 25. It does appear to have had more than its expected share of mining camp violence. In addition to the acts of arson noted above, there are a number of reports of thefts and killings. North of Snow Tent is a stream still called Bloody Run, after the number of corpses found there.
