= Secret Town =

Secret Town may refer to:

- Secret Town, California
- The Secret Town, novels

== See also ==
- Closed city
