= Pacific Railroad Acts =

Federal acts for first US transcontinental railroad

- Other short titles: Pacific Railway Act
- Long title: An Act to aid in the construction of a railroad and telegraph line from the Missouri river to the Pacific ocean, and to secure to the government the use of the same for postal, military, and other purposes
- Enacted by: the 37 United States Congress
- Effective: July 1, 1862

Citations
- Statutes at Large: 12 Stat. 489

Legislative history
- Introduced in the House of Representatives as H.R. 364 by Samuel Curtis on July 8, 1861; Committee consideration by Select Committee on the Pacific Railroad; Passed the House of Representatives on May 6, 1862 (Passed); Passed the Senate on June 20, 1862 (Passed); Signed into law by President Abraham Lincoln on July 1, 1862

Major amendments
- Pacific Railroad Act of 1863 (12 Stat. 807); Pacific Railroad Act of 1864 (13 Stat. 356); Pacific Railroad Act of 1865 (13 Stat. 504); Pacific Railroad Act of 1866 (14 Stat. 79)

The Pacific Railroad Acts of 1862 were a series of acts of Congress that promoted the construction of a "transcontinental railroad" (the Pacific Railroad) in the United States through authorizing the issuance of government bonds and the grants of land to railroad companies. In 1853, the War Department under then Secretary of War Jefferson Davis was authorized by the Congress to conduct surveys of five different potential transcontinental routes from the Mississippi ranging from north to south. It submitted a massive twelve volume report to Congress with the results in early 1855. However, no route or bill could be agreed upon and passed authorizing the Government's financial support and land grants until the secession of the southern states in 1861 removed their opposition to a central route. The Pacific Railroad Act of 1862 (12 Stat. 489) was the original act. Some of its provisions were subsequently modified, expanded, or repealed by four additional amending Acts: The Pacific Railroad Act of 1863 (12 Stat. 807), Pacific Railroad Act of 1864 (13 Stat. 356), Pacific Railroad Act of 1865 (13 Stat. 504), and Pacific Railroad Act of 1866 (14 Stat. 66).

The Pacific Railroad Act of 1862 began the practice of granting federal government owned lands directly to corporations; before that act, land grants were made to the states, for the benefit of corporations.

== Act of 1862, and amended 1864–65 ==
Pacific Railroad Act of 1862
- Long title: An Act to aid in the construction of a railroad and telegraph line from the Missouri river to the Pacific ocean, and to secure to the government the use of the same for postal, military, and other purposes
- Enacted by: the 37th United States Congress

Citations
- Statutes at Large: 12 Stat. 489

Legislative history
- Signed into law by President Abraham Lincoln on July 1, 1862

Major amendments
- March 3, 1863; 1864; March 3, 1865

The original 1862 Act's long title was An Act to aid in the construction of a railroad and telegraph line from the Missouri river to the Pacific ocean, and to secure to the government the use of the same for postal, military, and other purposes. It was based largely on a proposed bill originally reported six years earlier on August 16, 1856, to the 34th Congress by the Select Committee on the Pacific Railroad and Telegraph. Signed into law by President Abraham Lincoln on July 1, 1862, the 1862 Act authorized extensive land grants in the Western United States and the issuance of 30-year government bonds (at 6 percent) to the Union Pacific Railroad and Central Pacific Railroad (later the Southern Pacific Railroad) companies in order to construct a continuous transcontinental railroad between the eastern side of the Missouri River at Council Bluffs, Iowa (opposite from Omaha, Nebraska) and the navigable waters of the Sacramento River in Sacramento, California. Section 2 of the act granted each Company contiguous rights of way for their rail lines as well as all public lands within 100 feet (30 m) on either side of the track.

Section 3 granted an additional 10 square miles (26 km^{2}) of public land for every mile of grade except where railroads ran through cities or crossed rivers. The method of apportioning these additional land grants was specified in the act as being in the form of "five alternate sections per mile on each side of said railroad, on the line thereof, and within the limits of ten miles on each side" which thus provided the companies with a total of 6,400 acres (2,600 ha) for each mile of their railroad, resulting in checkerboarding. (The interspersed non-granted area remained as public lands under the custody and control of the United States General Land Office.) The U.S. Government Pacific Railroad Bonds were authorized by Section 5 to be issued to the companies at the rate of $16,000 per mile of tracked grade completed west of the designated base of the Sierra Nevadas and east of the designated base of the Rocky Mountains (UPRR). Section 11 of the act provided that the issuance of bonds "shall be treble the number per mile" (to $48,000) for tracked grade completed over and within the two mountain ranges (but limited to a total of 300 miles (480 km) at this rate), and doubled (to $32,000) per mile of completed grade laid between the two mountain ranges Section 12 of the act provided that the grades and curves were not to exceed the maximum grades and curves of the Baltimore and Ohio Railroad.

The 30-year U.S. government bonds authorized by the act would be issued and backed by the U.S. government, which would then provide the capital raised to the railroad companies upon completion of sections of the railroads in exchange for a lien on that section. The liens covered the railroads and all their fixtures, and all the loans were repaid in full (and with interest) by the companies as and when they became due.

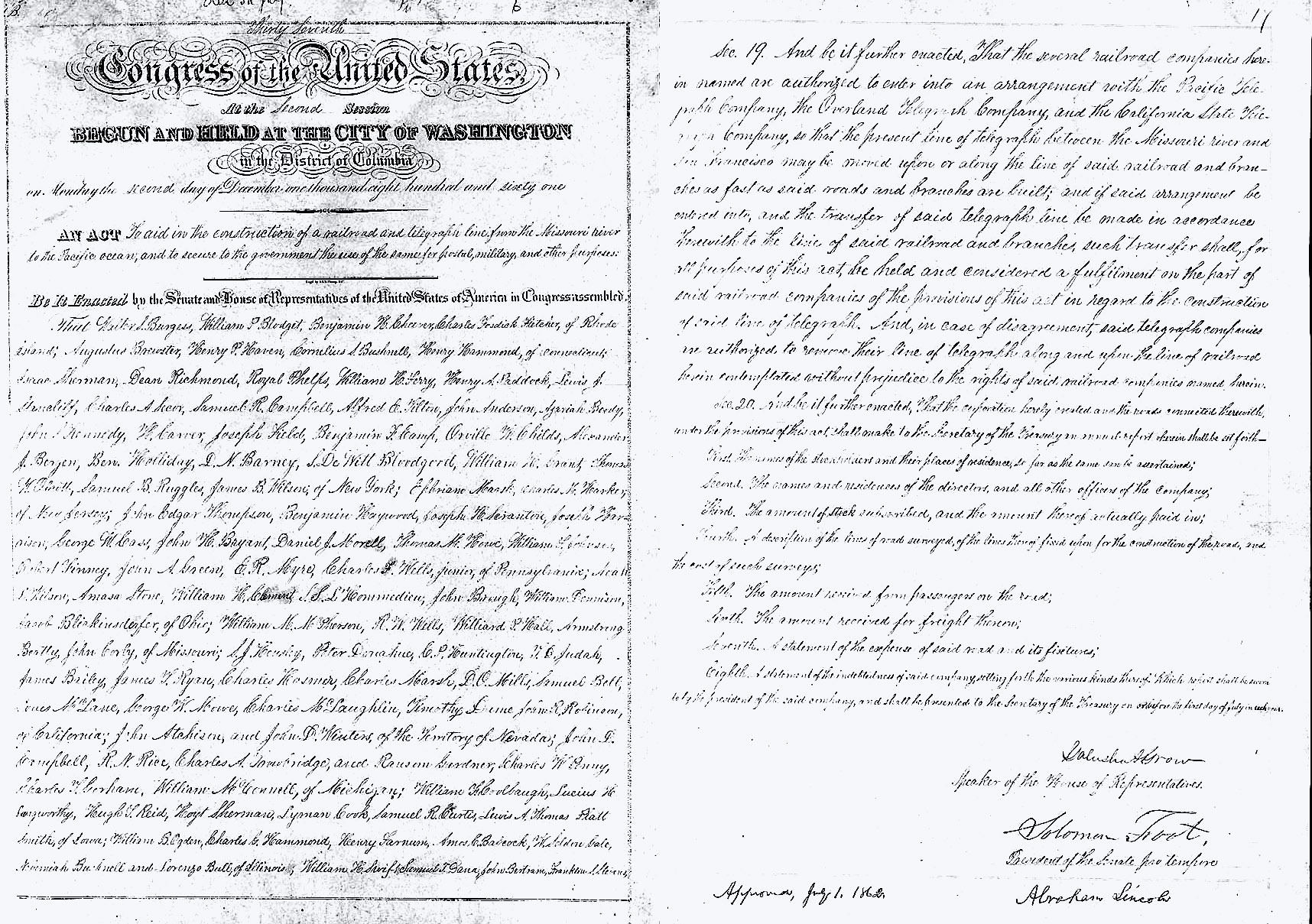
First and last pages of the original manuscript of the Pacific Railroad Act of 1862 (12 Stat. 489) signed by President Lincoln on July 1, 1862 (U.S. National Archives)

Section 10 of the 1864 amending Act (13 Statutes at Large, 356) additionally authorized the two charter companies to issue their own "First Mortgage Bonds" in total amounts up to (but not exceeding) that of the bonds issued by the United States, and that such company issued securities would have priority over the original Government Bonds.

The amending Act of March 3, 1865 ratified and confirmed the assignment made by Central Pacific Railroad to Western Pacific Railroad to construct the westernmost leg of the Pacific Railroad from Sacramento to San Jose and authorized Western Pacific as one of the charter companies.

From 1850 to 1871, the railroads received more than 175 million acres (71 million ha) of public land – an area more than one tenth of the whole United States and larger in area than Texas.

Railroad expansion provided new avenues of migration into the American interior. The railroads sold portions of their land to arriving settlers at a handsome profit. Lands closest to the tracks drew the highest prices, because farmers and ranchers wanted to locate near railway stations.

== Act of 1863 ==
The act of March 3, 1863 (12 Sta. 807) was:

AN ACT to establish the gauge of the Pacific railroad and its branches.
Be it enacted by the Senate and House of Representatives of the United States of America in Congress assembled, That the gauge of the Pacific railroad and its branches throughout their whole extent, from the Pacific coast to the Missouri river, shall be, and hereby is, established at four feet eight and one-half inches.

This act set the gauge to be used by the railroads at four feet and eight and one-half inches, a gauge that had previously been used by George Stephenson in England for the Liverpool and Manchester Railway (1830) and was already popular with railroads in the Northeastern states. Due in part to the 1863 Act the gauge would come to be widely (but not universally) adopted in the United States and is known as standard gauge. A common gauge choice allowed easy transfer of cars between different railroad companies and facilitates trackage rights between companies.

== Thurman Act ==
An act of Congress (May 7, 1878, 20 Stat. 56), which became known as the Thurman Act, was an amendment to solve disputes over the railroad subsidies, revenues, and loan repayments consequential to the original act.

== See also ==
- First transcontinental railroad
- Central Pacific Railroad
- Union Pacific Railroad
- Western Pacific Railroad (1862–1870)
- Kansas Pacific Railway Co. v. Dunmeyer A court case stemming from a disputed land grant.
- History of rail transport in the United States

== Related primary source documents (external links) ==
- Full annotated texts of all Acts and Resolves passed by the Congress of the United States relating to the Pacific Railroad (1862–1874) Central Pacific Railroad Photographic History Museum
- REPORT OF THE SELECT COMMITTEE ON THE PACIFIC RAILROAD AND TELEGRAPH Including a Minority Report & Proposed Pacific Railroad Acts, 34th Congress, 1st Session, House Report #358 (1856) Central Pacific Railroad Photographic History Museum
- FIRST MORTGAGE BONDS OF THE CENTRAL PACIFIC RAILROAD Business Prospects and Operations of the Company, and Exhibit of Earnings, &c., for Quarter Ending Sept. 30, 1867. Central Pacific Railroad Photographic History Museum
- The General Railroad Law of California. (May 20, 1861); Act to Aid in Carrying Out the Pacific Railroad and Telegraph Act of Congress. (April 4, 1864) Central Pacific Railroad Photographic History Museum
- Abstract from the 1862 Annual Report of the Commissioner of the General Land Office to the Secretary of the Interior relating to Government Land Grants under the Pacific Railroad Act of 1862, Western Mineral Lands, and Surveying Estimates. Central Pacific Railroad Photographic History Museum
- The Official "Date of Completion" of the Transcontinental Railroad under the Provisions of the Pacific Railroad Act of 1862, et seq., as Established by the Supreme Court of the United States to be November 6, 1869. (99 U.S. 402) 1879 Central Pacific Railroad Photographic History Museum
- ANNUAL REPORT OF THE COMMISSIONER OF RAILROADS, made to the Secretary of the Interior, for the year ending June 30, 1883. Appendix 1. Transcontinental Railroads. History of Construction. RAILROAD GRANT ACTS. Central Pacific Railroad Photographic History Museum
- Legislative History of the First Transcontinental Railroad Congressional Globe (1850–1873) Central Pacific Railroad Photographic History Museum
