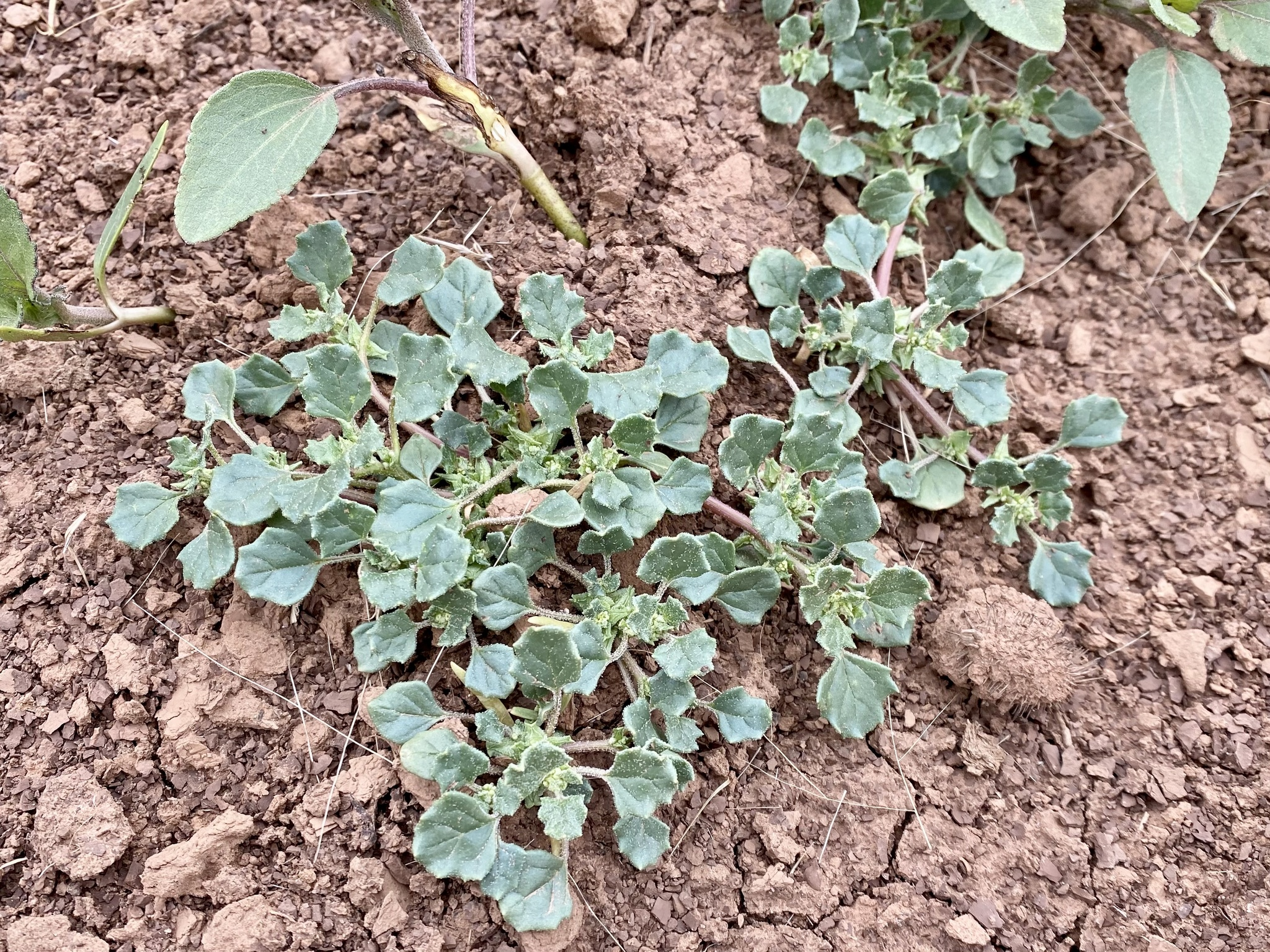
- Suckleya

Scientific classification
- Kingdom: Plantae
- Clade: Tracheophytes
- Clade: Angiosperms
- Clade: Eudicots
- Order: Caryophyllales
- Family: Amaranthaceae
- Genus: Suckleya; A.Gray (1876)
- Species: S. suckleyana

Binomial name
- Suckleya suckleyana (Torr.) Rydb. (1900)

Synonyms
- Atriplex suckleyana (Torr.) S.Watson (1874); Obione suckleyana Torr. (1860); Suckleya petiolaris A.Gray (1876), nom. superfl.

= Suckleya =

Species of flowering plant

Suckleya is a monotypic genus of flowering plants belonging to the family Amaranthaceae. It only contains one known species, Suckleya suckleyana (Torr.) Rydb.

Its native range is western central Canada (within the province of Alberta) to western central and southern central United States (with the states of Colorado, Montana, New Mexico, Texas and Wyoming).

The genus name of Suckleya and the Latin specific epithet of suckleyana is in honour of George Suckley (1830–1869), an American physician and naturalist notable as an explorer of the Washington and Oregon territories in the 1850s, and describer of several new fish species. It was first described and published in Proc. Amer. Acad. Arts Vol.11 on page 103 in 1876. The species was then published in Mem. New York Bot. Gard. Vol.1 on page 133 in 1900.
