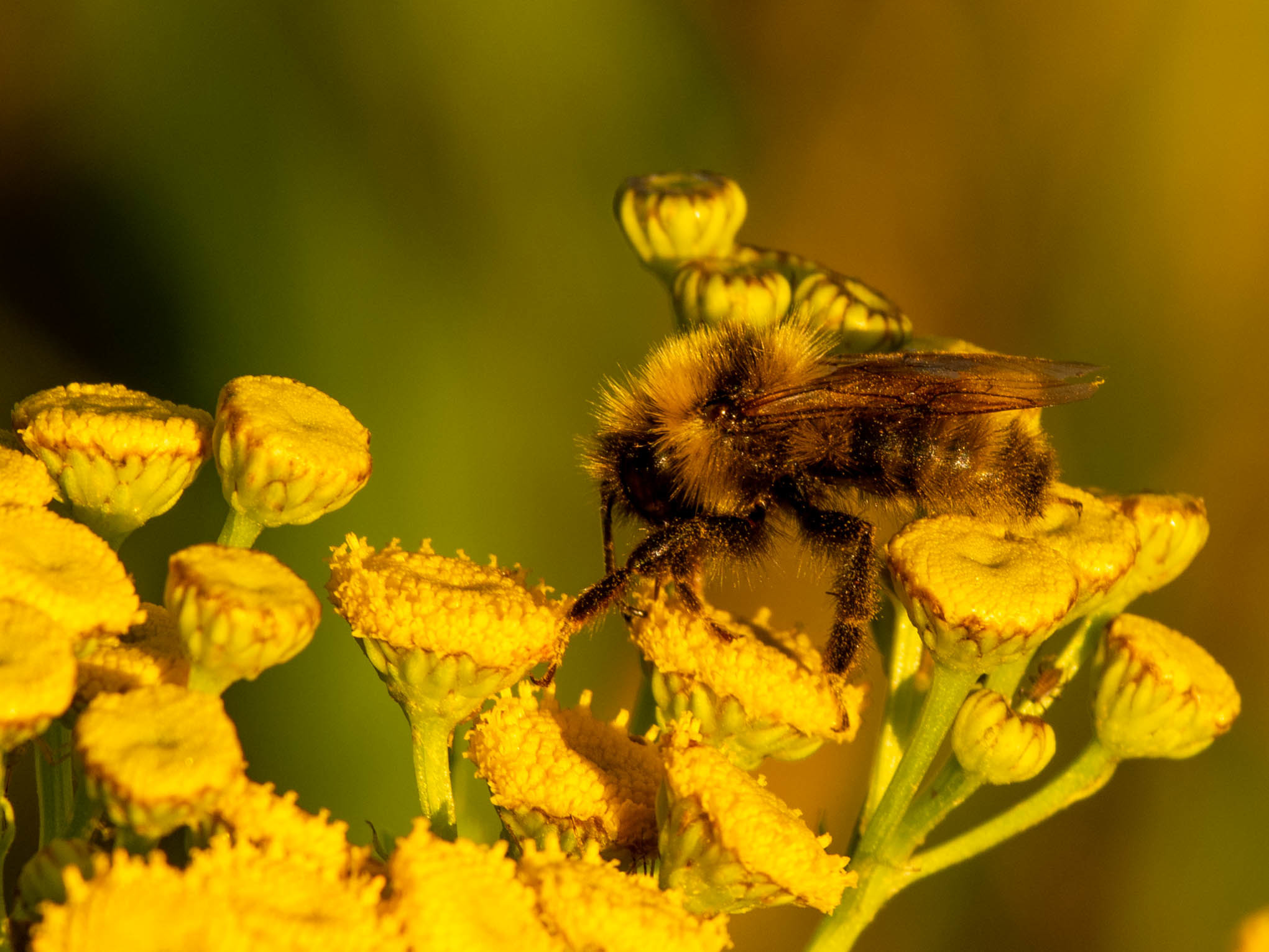
- St. Brieux, Saskatchewan, 2021

Conservation status
- Critically Endangered (IUCN 3.1)

Scientific classification
- Kingdom: Animalia
- Phylum: Arthropoda
- Clade: Pancrustacea
- Class: Insecta
- Order: Hymenoptera
- Family: Apidae
- Genus: Bombus
- Subgenus: Psithyrus
- Species: B. suckleyi

Binomial name
- Bombus suckleyi Greene, 1860

= Bombus suckleyi =

Species of bee

Bombus suckleyi is a species of bumblebee known commonly as Suckley's cuckoo bumblebee, named after biologist George Suckley. Suckley's bumble bee is a generalist pollinator and represents a rare group of obligate, parasitic bumble bees (cuckoo bumble bees). Suckley's bumble bee is a social-parasite because it invades the nests of the host bumble bees, including the western bumble bee (Bombus occidentalis), and relies on host species workers to provision its larvae. It is native to northwestern North America, including Alaska and parts of western and central Canada and the western United States.

== Taxonomy ==
Bumble bees are members of the genus Bombus within the insect order Hymenoptera and family Apidae. Bombus suckleyi was first described by John Greene and named after George Suckley. Suckley's bumble bee and all cuckoo bumble bees are classified under the subgenus Psithyrus. Bombus suckleyi is recognized as a valid species in the United States under the Integrated Taxonomic Information System (ITIS).

== Description and identification ==
Suckley's bumble bee is a member of the subgenus Psithyrus which contains all cuckoo bumble bees. This subgenus differs morphologically from other Bombus subgenera primarily because its members do not have corbicula (pollen-carrying baskets) on the tibia of their hind legs. Cuckoo bees do not gather nectar or pollen for their own brood and have lost the ability to carry large amounts of pollen and nectar on their body. Suckley's bumble bee can be distinguished from other bees based on physical characteristics and coloration. It is most similar to the Ashton cuckoo bumble bee (Bombus bohemicus), the indiscriminate bumble bee (Bombus insularis), and the Fernald cuckoo bumble bee (Bombus flavidus).

Suckley's bumble bee females are 0.72–0.92 in (18–23 mm) in length and covered in short hair of even length that is black, yellow, or white. The hind tibia has a round, convex shape with dense hairs and no pollen carrying basket. Suckley's bumble bee females have variable coloration with black faces and predominately yellow thorax. The abdomen consists of seven tergal segments: T1 and T2 are black, T3 has some yellow laterally and posterially with no yellow centrally, T4 is predominately yellow with a black patch centrally and anteriorally (contrast Aston cuckoo bumble bee), T5 is usually black, but can have some yellow laterally, and T6 and T7 are black.

Males are slightly smaller than females at 0.51–0.61 in (13–16 mm) in length and their hind legs are convex with few hairs. The male coloration is highly variable with consistently T1 and T4 yellow, some yellow on T2, T3, T5, T6, and T7 is black.

== Natural history ==
=== Life cycle and behavior ===
Suckley's bumble bee is a cuckoo bumble bee or social parasite of other Bombus species. Its life cycle is directly linked to a host species for survival because they have lost the ability to collect sufficient pollen and nectar to produce colonies. All individual Suckley's bumble bees are able to reproduce and there is no sterile worker caste, differing from eusocial Bombus species. Suckley's bumble bee females emerge later in the season than host species and invade a host colony by killing or subduing the resident queen. A Suckley's bumble bee female is not strictly speaking a queen because she does not produce any worker bees of her own, and instead controls the host workers to continue collecting pollen and nectar to provision her offspring. Once developed, individuals leave the nest to mate; mated females feed on nectar and pollen prior to overwintering and males die after mating. Females emerge in the spring and forage until they find a suitable host colony to invade. Suckley's bumble bee has been documented breeding in colonies of B. occidentallis and has been recorded in colonies of B. terricola, B. rufocinctus, B. fervidus, and B. nevadensis, and B. appositus. Suckley's bumble bee females in California are active from late May to late October, with their greatest activity in June. Males in California are active from early July to late September, with peaks in late July and early September.

=== Habitat ===
Suckley's bumble bee inhabits western meadows at a wide range of elevations. Like all bumble bees, Suckley's bumble bee requires suitable nesting sites for colonies, nectar and pollen resources during the colony period (spring, summer, and fall), and suitable overwintering sites for mated females. Suckley's bumble bee has historically been widespread across the western United States in a variety of meadow ecosystems. Historic observations have been most often made at higher elevations meadows within forest or subalpine zones.

Meadows often exist within patchy meadow-complexes and bumble bees are able to exploit scattered resources because they are mobile compared to other insects. Quality and quantity of bumble bee habitat varies at a landscape scale and bumble bees routinely forage over relatively large distances of > 1.25 miles (> 2 km) and require approximately 815–2,500 acres (3.3–10 km^{2}) of suitable habitat to sustain viable populations. The quantity and quality of floral resources within Suckley's range varies greatly, and floral-rich meadows are often interspersed within forests or exist in field margins and hedgerows within a matrix of flower-poor agricultural land.

Suckley's bumble bee and its host species rely on flowers through the entire growing season to produce large colonies. Suckley's bumble bee is a generalist forager and has been reported on a wide range of flowers mostly in the Asteraceae family and some in the Fabaceae family, with Aster, Chrysothamnus, Cirsium, and Solidago as example food plants. DiscoverLife lists the following as Suckley's floral associations (with number of observations): Cirsium (15), Aster sp. (11), Centaurea repens (10), and Trifolium sp. (4). Suckley's bumble bee depends on the success of its host species and its primary host, the western bumble bee, which feeds similarly on Ceanothus, Centaurea, Chrysothamnus, Cirsium, Geranium, Grindellia, Lupinus, Melilotus, Monardella, Rubus, Solidago, and Trifolum. The temporal distribution of flowering plants is important, as the amount of nectar and pollen during the early spring and late summer impact the growth of the host colony and for the production of Suckley's bumble bee individuals.

The nests that host Suckley's bumble bee are primarily underground cavities that have been created naturally or by other animals such as abandoned rodent nests. Suckley's bumble bee females also require sites where they hibernate during the winter after mating. Bumble bees are generally known to hibernate close to the ground surface or down an inch or two in loose soil, or under leaf litter or other debris, in sites that are undisturbed and have adequate organic material to provide shelter.

== Historic and current distribution ==
There are historic records of Suckley's bumble bee in 11 western states as well as all 10 Canadian provinces. In Canada, the species was historically spread across the southern portions of British Columbia, Alberta, and Saskatchewan with a disjunct population in Newfoundland.

Suckley's bumble bee recent observations have greatly diminished from historic abundance and range. Suckley's bumble bee has experienced an overall decline of 77%, losing more than 50% of its range and with relative abundance records at less than 10% of historic observations.

== Conservation ==
Suckley's bumble bee has been recognized as imperiled or needing protection by international and state entities. It has a NatureServe ranking of G1 or critically imperiled from 2018 and is considered critically endangered by the International Union for the Conservation of Nature (IUCN). It has experienced rapid, significant, recent declines, averaging over 77% during the last few decades. Its declines are associated with those of its host species. Other possible reasons for its declines include pesticides, loss of habitat, competition from introduced species of bees, climate change, and the parasite Nosema bombi. Multiple threats produce synergistic impacts to this species which make it more vulnerable to decline and extinction. Suckley's bumble bee and other cuckoo bumble bees are especially at risk of extinction because of their dependence on the success of host species.

Suckley's bumble bee is a species of ‘great conservation need’ in Washington, Idaho, Colorado, and California. Suckley's bumble bee was petitioned for federal Endangered Species Act protection in 2020.

A petition was submitted by the Xerces society, Defenders of Wildlife, and the Center for Food Safety to the California Fish and Game Commission in October 2018 to list Bombus suckleyi and three others as endangered under the California Endangered Species Act. The California Department of Fish and Wildlife evaluated this petition in a report for The California Fish and Game Commission completed in April 2019. On June 12, 2019, the California Fish and Game Commission voted to add the four bumblebees, including Bombus suckleyi, to the list of protected species under the California Endangered Species Act. A subsequent legal challenge of the CESA's definition of a fish as "a wild fish, mollusk, crustacean, invertebrate, amphibian, or part, spawn, or ovum of any of those animals" was eventually overruled, because the explicit intent was for all invertebrates (therefore including insects) to be qualified for protection under this legal definition.
