= George Suckley =

American physician and naturalist

- Suckley, c. 1862
- Born: September 30, 1830; New York City, U.S.
- Died: July 30, 1869 (aged 38); New York City, U.S.
- Education: College of Physicians and Surgeons (MD, 1851)
- Known for: Pacific Railroad Surveys; The Natural History of Washington Territory (1859)
- Scientific career
- Fields: Medicine; natural history; ichthyology
- Workplaces: New York Hospital; United States Army (1853–1856); Union Army (1861–1865)
- Author abbrev. (zoology): Suckley

George Suckley (1830–1869) was an American medical doctor and naturalist notable as an explorer of Washington and Oregon territories in the 1850s, and describer of several new fish species.

== Life ==
He was born in New York City, studied at the College of Physicians and Surgeons (today Columbia University), received an M.D. in 1851, and subsequently served as surgeon at New York Hospital.

In April 1853 Suckley was appointed assistant surgeon and naturalist to the Pacific Railroad Survey led by Isaac Stevens. Initially commissioned as a surgeon with the U.S. Army, Suckley resigned in 1856 to pursue natural history full-time resulting in the publication of several works on the natural history of the Pacific Northwest.

Upon the outbreak of the American Civil War, Suckley rejoined the Army and worked as a surgeon throughout the war. He died in New York City a few years after the war.

Two fish species, Squalus suckleyi Girard 1855, and Catostomus sucklii Girard 1856, and the bumblebee Bombus suckleyi are named after George Suckley.

In 1856, American botanist A.Gray published Suckleya, a genus of flowering plants from America belonging to the family Amaranthaceae, which were named in George Suckley's honor.

== Works ==
- (with James Graham Cooper) Natural History of Washington Territory (1859)
