= Secret Town, California =

Unincorporated community in California, United States

Secret
- Unincorporated community
- Location in California Secret (the United States)
- Coordinates: 39°09′26″N 120°52′40″W
- Country: United States
- State: California
- County: Placer County
- Elevation: 2,904 ft (885 m)

Secret Town was a historical mining town in Placer County, California. It was located 5 miles (8.0 km) northeast of Colfax, at an elevation of 2904 feet (885 m).

== Name ==
After gold was discovered in this area, miners wanted to keep the location a secret, hence the unusual name.

== Railway bridge ==
Secret Town was the site of a very long trestle railroad bridge. The 1100 ft (335 m) long and 95 ft (29 m) high Secret Town wooden trestle on the Central Pacific Railroad's grade, like most of the other trestles of the line, was filled in with earth and rock after the railroad opened to traffic and could afford to send Chinese laborers back to improve the right-of-way by reducing the risk of catching fire from smokestack sparks as steam locomotives crossed.

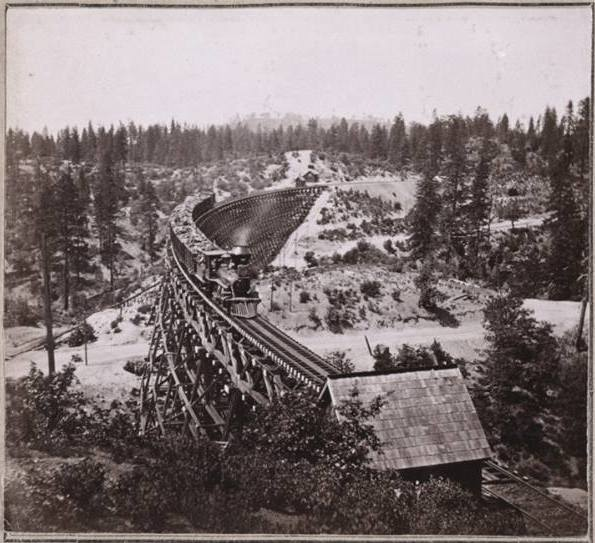
Secret Town trestle, ca. 1870

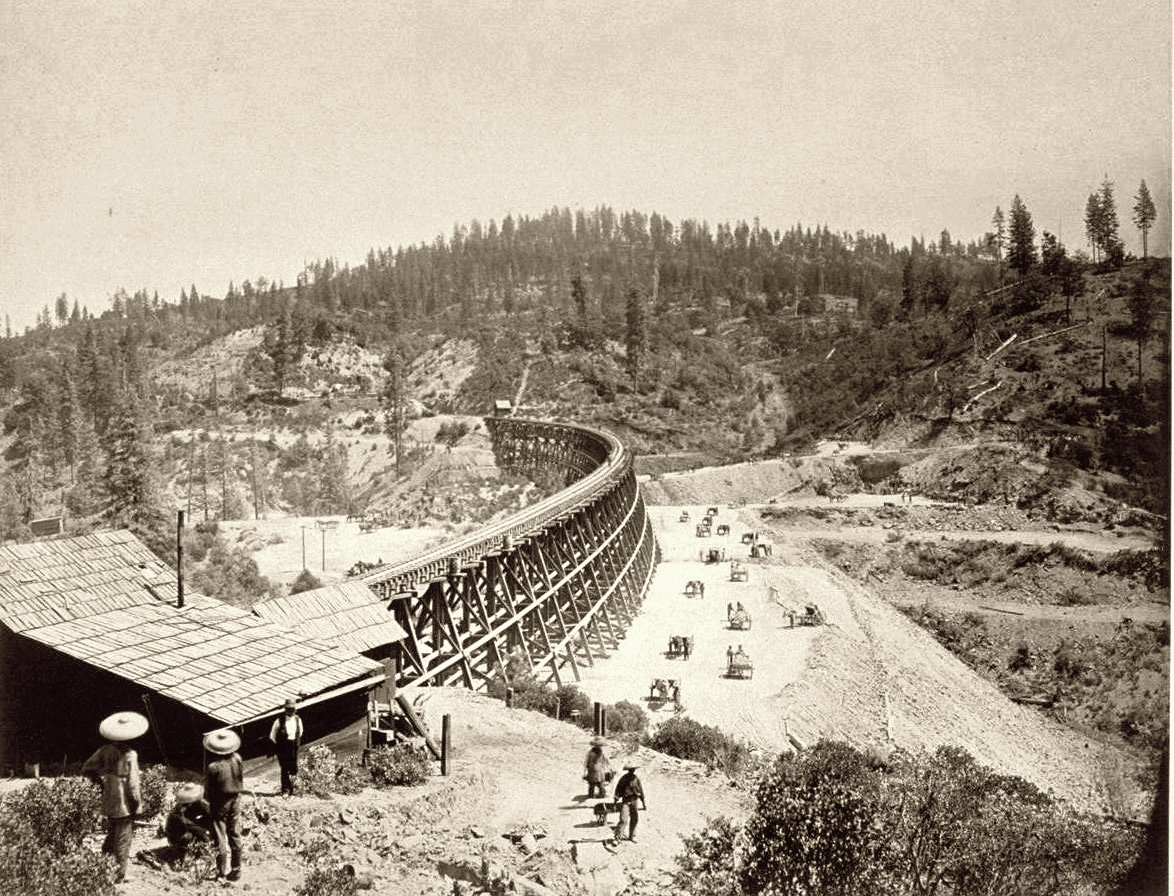
Chinese laborers fill Secret Town trestle, 1877
