= Charles Marsh (railroad builder) =

Charles Marsh (December 6, 1825 – May 22, 1876) was an influential figure in the building of the first transcontinental railroad, as well as in building water systems for mining in the Sierra Nevada Mountains during the California Gold Rush. He was one of the founding directors of the Central Pacific Railroad. He was a surveyor and worked with Theodore D. Judah to survey and evaluate various possible routes for the first transcontinental railroad through the Sierra Nevada. He built a number of ditches and water pipelines to serve mines and towns there, and became known as the “Father of Ditches.” He was also one of the founders of the Nevada County Narrow Gauge Railroad.

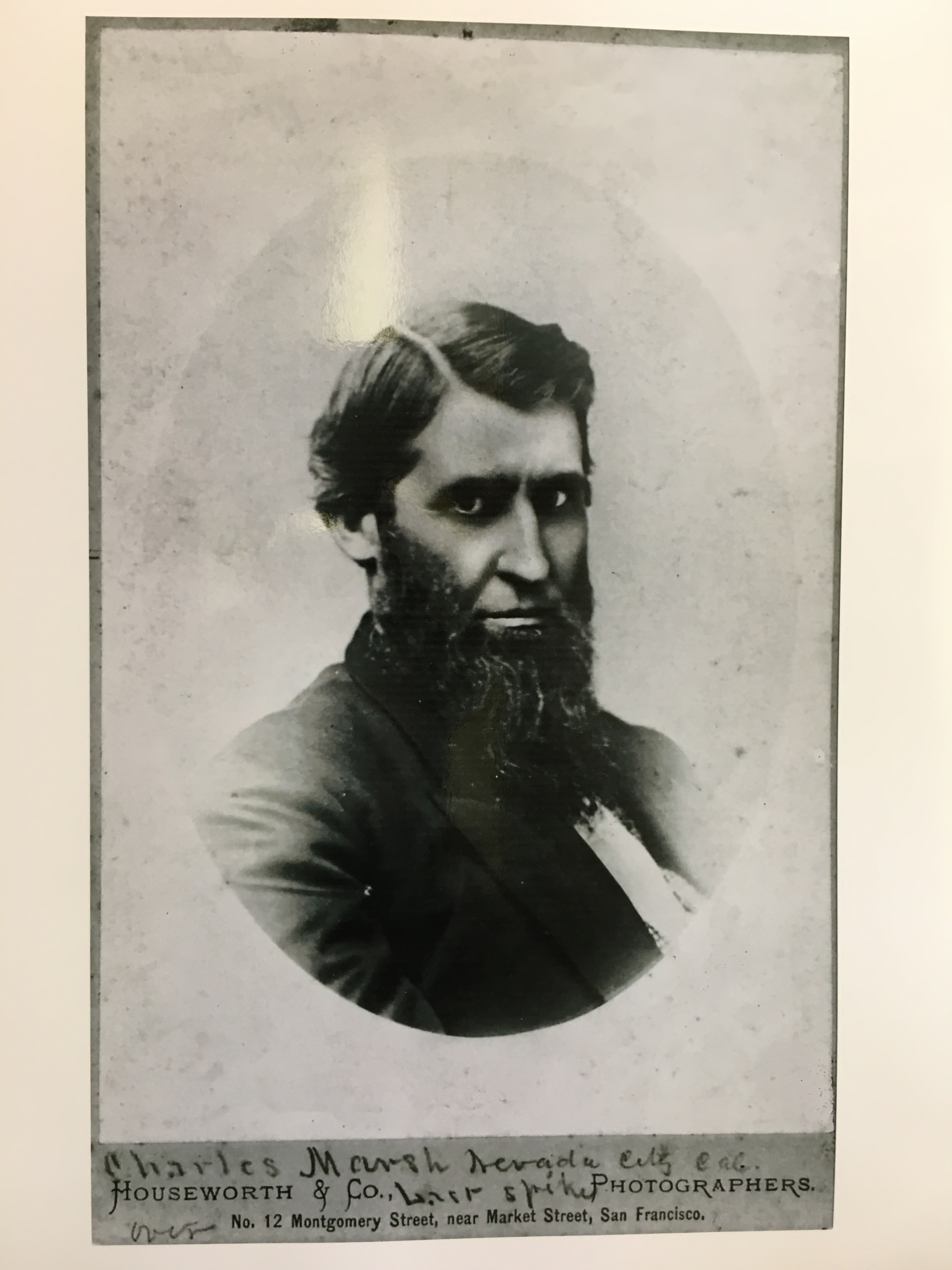
Charles Marsh. Photo courtesy of the Nevada County Historical Society, Searls Historical Library, Nevada City, California.

== Builder of ditches/canals and entrepreneur ==
Marsh was born December 6, 1825, in Hatley, Quebec, Canada. It seems he spent his early years in Vermont, then moved with his family to the Milwaukee area of Wisconsin, where he studied civil engineering. In 1849, at age 23, he came to California and tried his hand at prospecting near what later became Nevada City, California. He found $3,000 in gold, and the next year, he conceived a plan to bring water to Coyote Diggings there. In conjunction with three others, he built a nine-mile ditch at a cost of $10,000. When completed, the investment paid for itself in six weeks.

This eventually evolved into the South Yuba Canal Company, the largest network of ditches in California with 250 miles (400 km) of ditches and 20 reservoirs. Over the years, the industrious Marsh was the founder, director and/or investor in a multitude of water companies, railroads, mines, etc., including the Henness Pass Turnpike Company, Excelsior Canal Company, Union Hotel, Banner Mine, and the Bank of Nevada County.

"East meets West" at the completion of the first transcontinental railroad at Promontory Summit, Utah, on May 10, 1869. The Central Pacific Railroad locomotive "Jupiter" is on the left, and Union Pacific No. 119 on the right. The only two members of the Central Pacific board of directors to attend the ceremony were Leland Stanford and Charles Marsh.

In 1850, at age 24, Marsh was elected county surveyor, and laid out the western boundary of the county. That year, in partnership with two others, he built the 45-mile (72 km) Grizzly Ditch, which was completed in 1851 at a cost of $50,000.

In 1852, he surveyed the townsite of Walloupa, and built the Walloupa Ditch. That year he became a director of the Sacramento, Auburn and Nevada Railroad and surveyed its proposed route from Sacramento to Nevada City. He estimated that it would cost two million dollars to build the railroad. Unable to raise the required funds, the project was dropped. A decade later, when the Central Pacific Railroad was built, it began at Sacramento and went through Auburn on its way to Nevada.

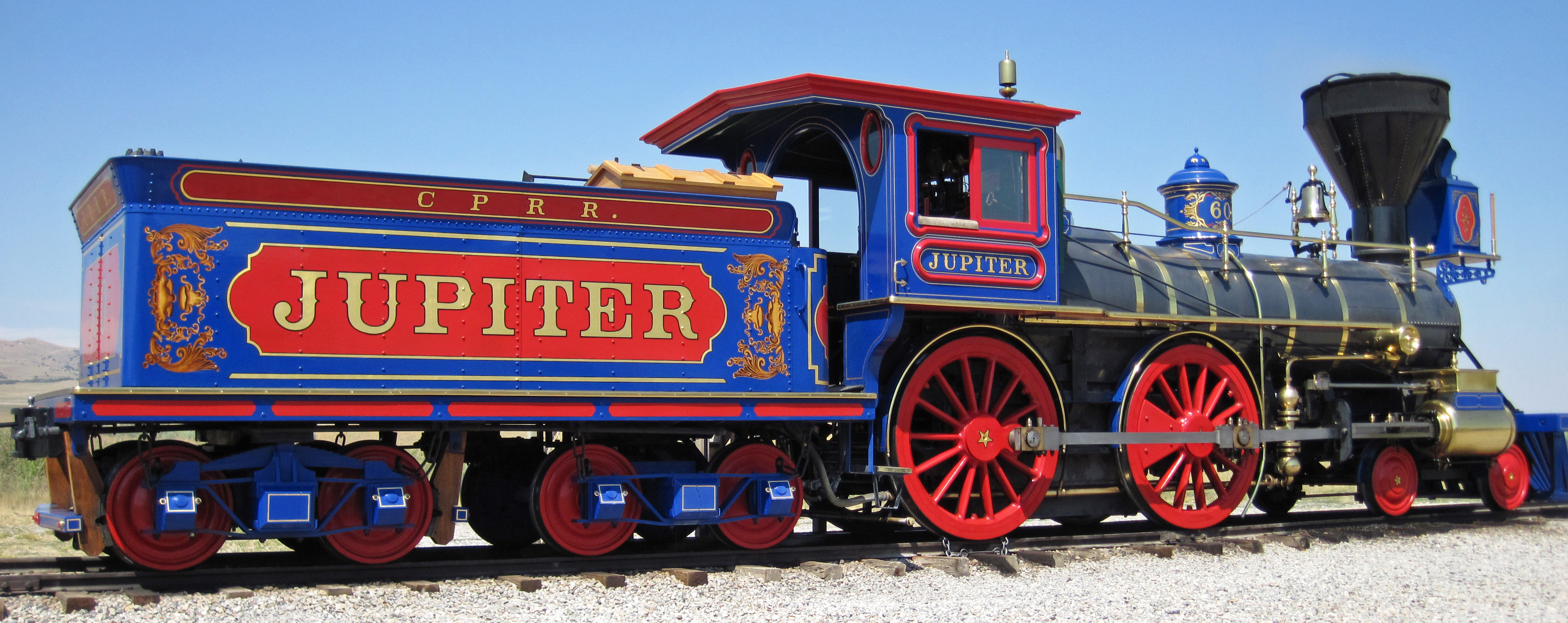
This replica of the Central Pacific "Jupiter" (built by O’Connor Engineering Company) is at the Golden Spike National Historic Site at Promontory Summit, Utah, along with a replica of the Union Pacific #119.

Marsh became chairman of the county board of supervisors in 1855, at the age of 30, and continued building and operating various ditches/canals bringing water to mines and towns. As owner of the Nevada Water Works, he built a water pipe system to serve Nevada City.

== Planning and building the first transcontinental railroad ==
In the fall of 1860, Marsh, surveyor, civil engineer and water company owner, met with Theodore Judah, civil engineer, who had recently built the Sacramento Valley Railroad from Sacramento to Folsom, California. Marsh, who had already surveyed a potential railroad route between Sacramento and Nevada City, California, a decade earlier, went with Judah into the Sierra Nevada Mountains. There they examined the Henness Pass Turnpike Company’s route (Marsh was a founding director of that company). They measured elevations and distances, and discussed the possibility of a transcontinental railroad. Both came back convinced that it could be done.

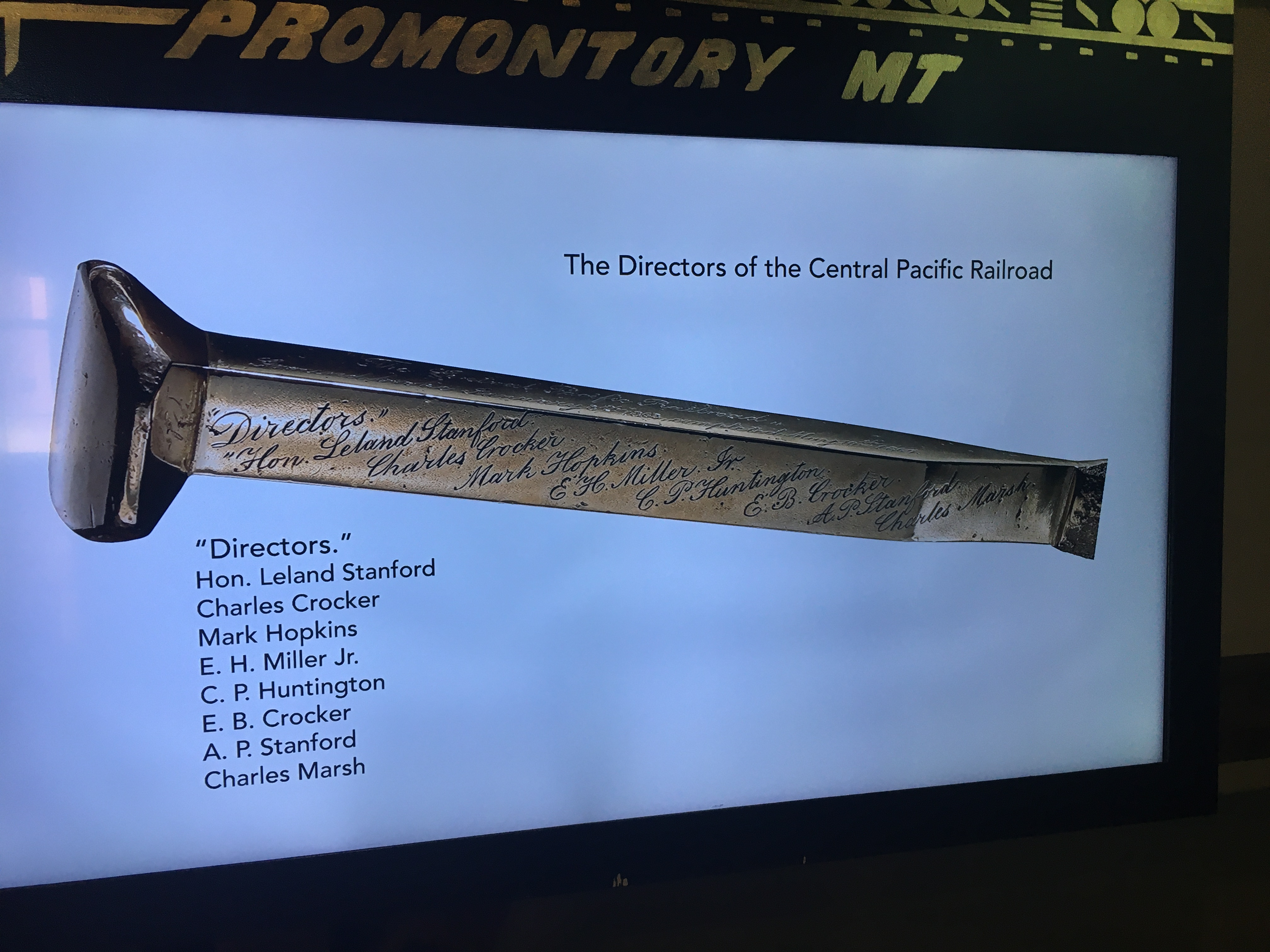
Gold Spike at the California State Railroad Museum, Sacramento, California. The museum also has a wall-sized painting of the Gold Spike ceremony which includes images of Charles Marsh and Leland Stanford.

In December 1860 or early January 1861, Marsh met with Theodore Judah and Dr. Daniel Strong in Strong’s drug store in Dutch Flat, California, to discuss the project, which they called the Central Pacific Railroad of California. James Bailey, a friend of Judah, told Leland Stanford that Judah had a feasible route for a railroad across the Sierras, and urged Stanford to meet with Judah. In early 1861, Marsh, Judah and Strong met with Collis P. Huntington, Leland Stanford, Mark Hopkins Jr. and Charles Crocker to obtain financial backing. Papers were filed to incorporate the new company, and on April 30, 1861, the eight of them, along with Lucius Anson Booth, became the first board of directors of the Central Pacific Railroad. Marsh was one of the initial investors and owned 50 shares, about 4% of the new company (The percentage changed as more shares were sold).

In 1862, Marsh, Judah, Huntington and Congressman Aaron Sargent explored possible railroad routes over the Sierra Nevada, including visiting the Donner cabins, Fuller’s crossing on the Truckee River, and Washoe, Long and Sierra Valleys. Later, Marsh, Judah and Huntington also explored a possible route along the Middle Fork of the Feather River.

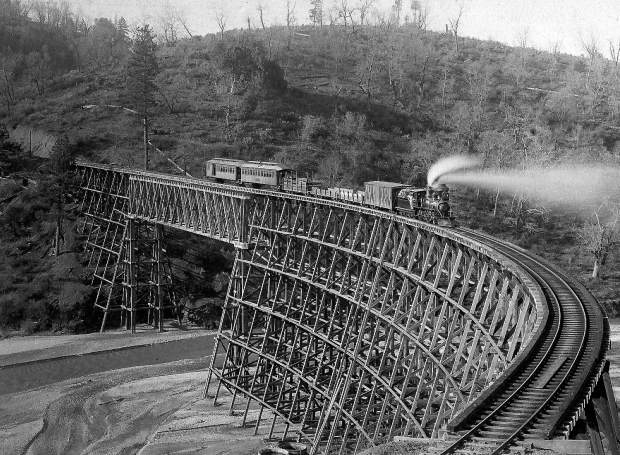
The Bear River Bridge on the Nevada County Narrow-Gauge Railroad, which was the highest railroad bridge in the state. Some of the railroad’s rolling stock is preserved at the Nevada County Narrow Gauge Railroad & Transportation Museum in Nevada City, California. Photo courtesy of the Searls Historical Library collection, Nevada City, California.

On May 10, 1869, the Central Pacific Railroad, which was building east from Sacramento, California, met the Union Pacific Railroad, which was building west from Council Bluffs, Iowa, at Promontory Summit, Utah. This completed the first transcontinental railroad. Of the members of the Central Pacific Railroad’s board of directors, only Leland Stanford and Charles Marsh attended the Gold Spike ceremony.

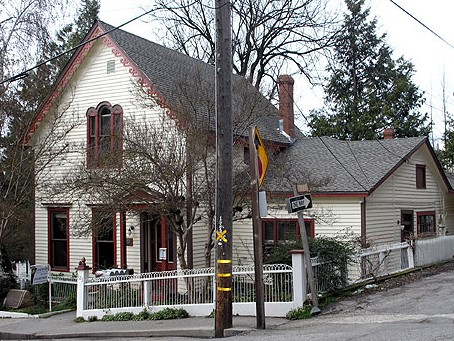
Charles Marsh House, 123 Nevada St., Nevada City, California. In November 1853, Marsh was in such demand as a surveyor that when he returned to his office, someone would ring a bell to announce that fact to people anxiously waiting for surveys.

== Founder of the Nevada County Narrow Gauge Railroad ==
In 1874, Marsh was one of the organizers of and investors in the Nevada County Narrow Gauge Railroad. This line connected Nevada City, California with the Central Pacific at Colfax, California. Marsh was active in both the Masons and Odd Fellows, and held the highest offices in the state of those organizations. In April 1876, at age 50, he was thrown from a carriage in San Francisco, fracturing his skull, and died of his injuries. His funeral, attended by over 1,000 people, was one of the largest in memory.
