= Henness Pass =

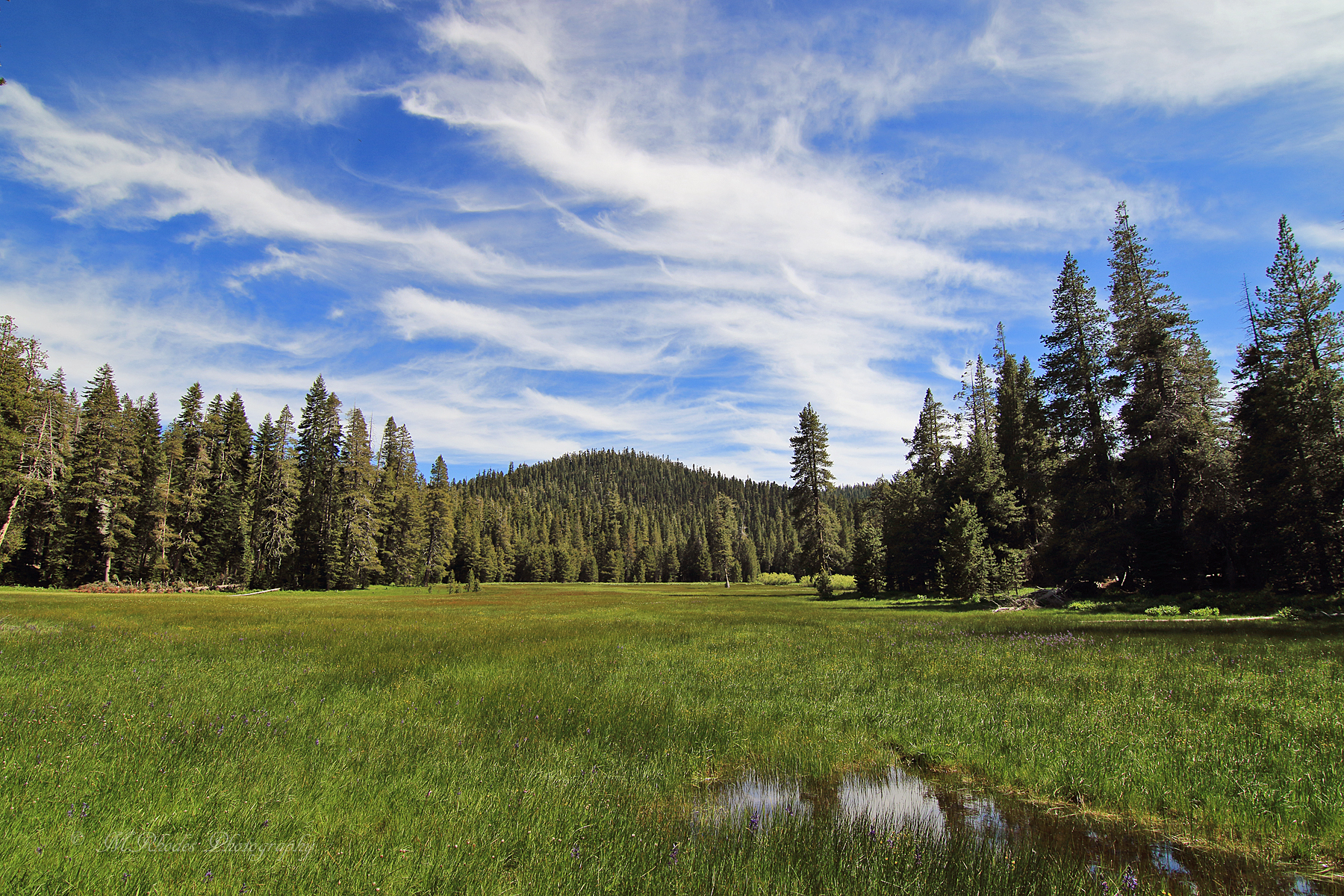
- Henness Pass

- Location within California
- Elevation: 6,916 feet (2,108 m)
- Traversed by: Henness Pass Road

Third Approach
- Location: Sierra County, California, U.S.
- Range: Sierra Nevada
- Coordinates: 39°30′10″N 120°26′22″W
- Topo map: USGS Sattley

Henness Pass, at an elevation of 6,916 ft (2,108 m), is a mountain pass located northwest of Reno on the crest of the Sierra Nevada range in Sierra County, California. The pass is traversed by Henness Pass Road, a mostly unpaved road not generally passable by automobiles in winter. Portions of the road are recommended for high clearance vehicles only.

Like most of the well-known Sierra Nevada passes, it lies on the Great Basin Divide. Here, the Middle Yuba River flows west to the Pacific Ocean, and the Little Truckee River flows east into the Great Basin.

Historically, Henness Pass Road was a travel route used by Native Americans and then immigrants and local mining communities during the Gold Rush era. Beginning in the late 1850s, the road was a major supply route for the silver and gold mines in Nevada. Freight was brought by steamboat from San Francisco up the Sacramento River to Marysville. From there it was carried by wagons, with part of the route being via the Bridgeport Covered Bridge and the Virginia Turnpike, which connected to the road to Henness Pass at North San Juan.

Henness Pass is named for Patrick Henness, who is credited with developing the route in 1849 or 1850 as an alternative to Donner Pass. In 1855 the road was officially surveyed by D.B. Scott when the California Legislature passed An Act to Construct a Wagon Road over the Sierra Nevada range, but a route through El Dorado County approximating the current path of U.S. Route 50 was ultimately chosen.

Charles Marsh was a founding director of the Henness Pass Turnpike Company, and was a civil engineer who built and owned water systems serving the mines and towns of Nevada County, California beginning in the 1850s. His intimate familiarity with the topography of the area led to his accompanying Theodore D. Judah (who wanted to build a transcontinental railroad) on a reconnaissance of the Sierra Nevada Mountains in 1860. They proceeded over the Henness route, taking elevations and measurements, and came back both convinced that a railroad crossing of the imposing mountains was feasible. They also explored the Donner Pass route, and agreed that it was more favorable.

The Henness Pass route was eclipsed by completion in 1868 of the First transcontinental railroad as far as Reno via Donner Pass. Henness Pass and its namesake road still provide the only crossing of any significance between Yuba Pass (State Route 49) to the north and Donner Summit (Interstate 80) to the south.

== See also ==
- http://cprr.org/Museum/Maps/Nevada_Survey_Maps/
