= First transcontinental railroad =

First U.S. railroad connecting the Pacific coast and Eastern states

- The ceremony for the driving of the "Last Spike" at Promontory Summit, Utah, May 10, 1869

Overview
- Other name: Pacific Railroad
- Owner: U.S. government
- Locale: United States
- Termini: Council Bluffs, Iowa (Omaha, Nebraska); Alameda Terminal, starting September 6, 1869; Oakland Long Wharf, starting November 8, 1869 (San Francisco Bay)

Service
- Operator(s): Central Pacific; Union Pacific

History
- Opened: May 10, 1869; 157 years ago

Technical
- Line length: 1,912 mi (3,077 km)
- Track gauge: 4 ft 8 1/2 in (1,435 mm) standard gauge
Route map
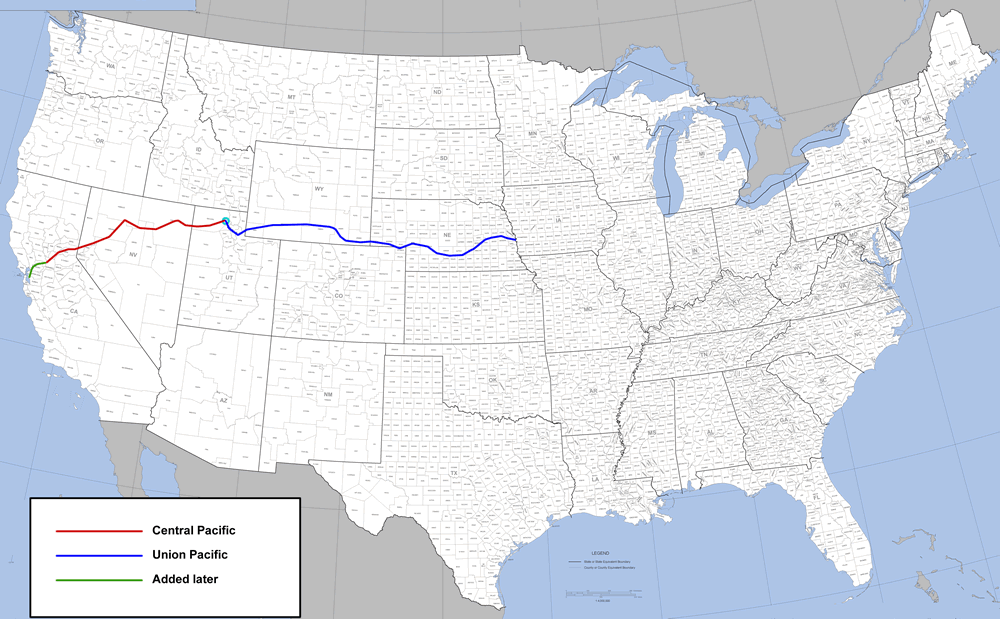
1863–1869: Union Pacific built westwards (blue line), Central Pacific built eastwards (red) and Western Pacific built the last leg (green)

America's first transcontinental railroad (known originally as the "Pacific Railroad" and later as the "Overland Route") was a 1,911-mile (3,075 km) continuous railroad line built between 1863 and 1869 that connected the existing eastern U.S. rail network at Council Bluffs, Iowa, with the Pacific coast at the Oakland Long Wharf on San Francisco Bay. The rail line was built by three private companies over public lands provided by extensive U.S. land grants. Building was financed by both state and U.S. government subsidy bonds as well as by company-issued mortgage bonds. (Note: The total value of the thirty year 6% US Government subsidy bonds issued to the three companies was $55,092,192 and the amount of federal lands specified by Pacific Railroad Acts of 1862 and 1864 to which the UPRR, CPRR and WPRR were entitled was 21,100,000 acres (8,500,000 hectares) of which 2,391,009 acres (967,607 hectares) had been patented as of March 1876.) The Western Pacific Railroad Company built 132 miles (212 km) of track from the road's western terminus at Alameda/Oakland to Sacramento, California. The Central Pacific Railroad Company of California (CPRR) constructed 690 miles (1,110 km) east from Sacramento to Promontory Summit, Utah Territory. The Union Pacific Railroad (UPRR) built 1,085 miles (1,746 km) from the road's eastern terminus at the Missouri River settlements of Council Bluffs and Omaha, Nebraska, westward to Promontory Summit.

The railroad opened for through traffic between Sacramento and Omaha on May 10, 1869, when CPRR President Leland Stanford ceremonially tapped the gold "Last Spike" (later often referred to as the "Golden Spike") with a silver hammer at Promontory Summit. (Note: Paddle steamers linked Sacramento to the cities and their harbor facilities in the San Francisco Bay until late 1869, when the CPRR completed and opened the Western Pacific portion (which the CPRR had acquired control of in 1867–68 to Alameda first and then to Oakland.)) In the following six months, the last leg from Sacramento to San Francisco Bay was completed. The resulting coast-to-coast railroad connection revolutionized the settlement and economy of the American West. (Note: "The charter of the last-named Company [Western Pacific Railroad] contemplated a line from Sacramento toward San Francisco, making the circuit of the Bay of that name [to San José]. Their franchise has recently [late 1867] been assigned to parties in the interest of the Central Pacific Railroad Company; and it is probable that this line will be formally incorporated with the Central Pacific Railroad, and the road extended from Sacramento to San Francisco by the "best, most direct and practicable route" so soon as the overland connection is completed. In the meantime the travel is abundantly accommodated by first-class steamers." – Central Pacific Railroad Company of California "Railroad Across the Continent, with an account of the Central Pacific Railroad of California", pp. 9–10, New York: Brown & Hewitt, Printers. September 1868.) (Note: The legal "date of completion" of the WPRR grade was subsequently designated to be January 22, 1870. The formal consolidation of the Central Pacific Railroad of California with the Western Pacific Railroad Co., San Joaquin Valley Railroad Co., and San Francisco, Oakland & Alameda Railroad Co. under the name of the Central Pacific Railroad Company became effective on June 22, 1870, with the filing of Articles of Consolidation drawn under the laws of California with the California Secretary of State.) It brought the western states and territories into alignment with the northern Union states and made transporting passengers and goods coast-to-coast considerably quicker, safer and less expensive.

The first transcontinental rail passengers arrived at the Pacific Railroad's original western terminus at Alameda Terminal on September 6, 1869, where they transferred to the steamer Alameda for transport across the Bay to San Francisco. The road's rail terminus was moved two months later to the Oakland Long Wharf, about a mile to the north, when its expansion was completed and opened for passengers on November 8, 1869. (Note: The new terminus opened on November 8, later deemed to be two days after the official "completion date" of the Pacific Railroad. Section 6 of the Pacific Railroad Act of 1862, et seq. required that an official date of completion be determined for the purpose of determining how other provisions of the Acts would be carried out. November 6, 1869, was confirmed as being that date by the US Supreme Court in Part I of the Court's Opinion and Order dated January 27, 1879, in re Union Pacific Railroad vs. United States (99 U.S. 402).) Service between San Francisco and Oakland Pier continued to be provided by ferry.

The CPRR eventually purchased 53 miles (85 km) of UPRR-built grade from Promontory Summit (MP 828) to Ogden, Utah Territory (MP 881), which became the interchange point between trains of the two roads. The transcontinental line became popularly known as the Overland Route after the name of the principal passenger rail service to Chicago that operated over the length of the line until 1962.

== Overall significance ==
Railroads not only increased the speed of transport, but also dramatically lowered its cost. The first transcontinental railroad resulted in passengers and freight being able to cross the country in a matter of days instead of months and at one tenth the cost of stagecoach or wagon transport. With economical transportation in the West (which had been referred to as the Great American Desert) now farming, ranching and mining could be done at a profit. As a result, railroads transformed the country, particularly the West (which had few navigable rivers).

For example, before the railroads were built in the West, if a farmer were to ship a load of corn only 200 miles to Chicago, the shipping cost by wagon would exceed the price for which the corn could be sold. So, under such circumstances, farming could not be done at a profit. Mining and other economic activity in the West were similarly inhibited because of the high cost of wagon transportation. One Congressman, referring to the West, bluntly stated that, “All that land wasn’t worth ten cents until the railroads came.”

Freight rates by rail were a small fraction of what they had been with wagon transport. When the United States concluded the Louisiana Purchase in 1803, people thought that it would take 300 years to populate it. With the introduction of the railroad, it took only 30 years. The low cost of shipping by rail resulted in the Great American Desert becoming the great American breadbasket.

== Origins ==
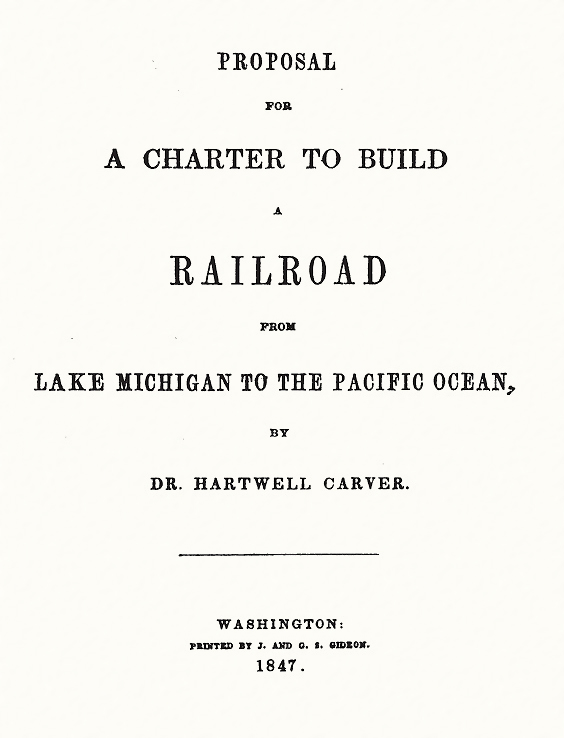
Title page of Dr. Hartwell Carver's 1847 Pacific Railroad proposal to Congress from Lake Michigan to the West Coast

Among the early proponents of building a railroad line that would connect the coasts of the United States was Dr. Hartwell Carver, who in 1847 submitted to the U.S. Congress a "Proposal for a Charter to Build a Railroad from Lake Michigan to the Pacific Ocean", seeking a congressional charter to support his idea. (Note: Carver's 1847 proposal records himself as having written a newspaper article on the subject in 1837. Some sources say that he wrote such an article in 1832.)

=== Preliminary exploration ===
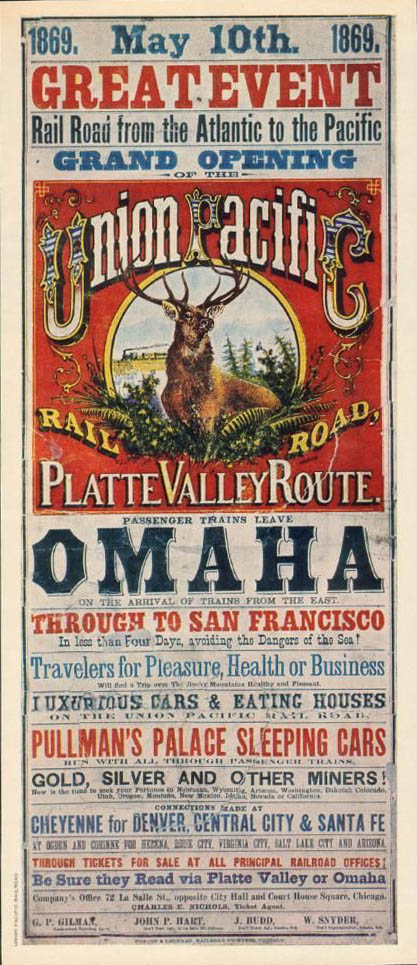
The official poster announcing the Pacific Railroad's grand opening

Congress agreed to support the idea. Under the direction of the Department of War, the Pacific Railroad Surveys were conducted from 1853 through 1855. These included an extensive series of expeditions of the American West seeking possible routes. A report on the explorations described alternative routes and included an immense amount of information about the American West, covering at least 400,000 sq mi (1,000,000 km^{2}). It included the region's natural history and illustrations of reptiles, amphibians, birds, and mammals.

The report did not include detailed topographic maps of potential routes needed to estimate the feasibility, cost and select the best route. However, the survey was detailed enough to determine that the best southern route lay south of the Gila River boundary with Mexico in mostly vacant desert, through the future territories of Arizona and New Mexico. This in part motivated the United States to complete the Gadsden Purchase.

In 1856, the Select Committee on the Pacific Railroad and Telegraph of the US House of Representatives published a report recommending support for a proposed Pacific railroad bill:

The necessity that now exists for constructing lines of railroad and telegraphic communication between the Atlantic and Pacific coasts of this continent is no longer a question for argument; it is conceded by every one. In order to maintain our present position on the Pacific, we must have some more speedy and direct means of intercourse than is at present afforded by the route through the possessions of a foreign power.

=== Possible routes ===
The U.S. Congress was strongly divided on where the eastern terminus of the railroad should be—in a southern or northern city. Three routes were considered:

- A northern route roughly along the Missouri River through present-day northern Montana to Oregon Territory. This was considered impractical because of the rough terrain and extensive winter snows. (Note: Later, the Northern Pacific Railway (NP) found and built a better route across the northern tier of the western United States from Minnesota to the Pacific Coast. It was approved by Congress in 1864 and given nearly 40 million acres (160,000 km^{2}) of land grants, which it used to raise money in Europe. Construction began in 1870 and the main line opened all the way from the Great Lakes to the Pacific Ocean on September 8, 1883.)
- A central route following the Platte River in Nebraska through to the South Pass in Wyoming, following most of the Oregon Trail. Snow on this route remained a concern.
- A southern route across Texas, New Mexico Territory, the Sonora desert, connecting to Los Angeles, California. Surveyors found during an 1848 survey that the best route lay south of the border between the United States and Mexico. This was resolved by the Gadsden Purchase in 1853. (Note: The southern route was constructed in 1880 when the Southern Pacific Railroad crossed Arizona territory.)

Once the central route was chosen, it was immediately obvious that the western terminus should be Sacramento. But there was considerable difference of opinion about the eastern terminus. Three locations along 250 miles (400 km) of Missouri River were considered:

- St. Joseph, Missouri, accessed via the Hannibal and St. Joseph Railroad.
- Kansas City, Kansas / Leavenworth, Kansas, accessed via the Leavenworth, Pawnee and Western Railroad, controlled by Thomas Ewing Jr. and later by John C. Frémont.
- Council Bluffs, Iowa / Omaha, Nebraska, accessed via an extension of Union Pacific financier Thomas C. Durant's proposed Mississippi and Missouri Railroad and the new Union Pacific Railroad, also controlled by Durant.

Council Bluffs had several advantages: It was well north of the Civil War fighting in Missouri; it was the shortest route to South Pass in the Rockies in Wyoming; and it would follow a fertile river that would encourage settlement. Durant had hired the future president Abraham Lincoln in 1857 when he was an attorney to represent him in a business matter about a bridge over the Missouri. Now Lincoln was responsible for choosing the eastern terminus, and he relied on Durant's counsel.

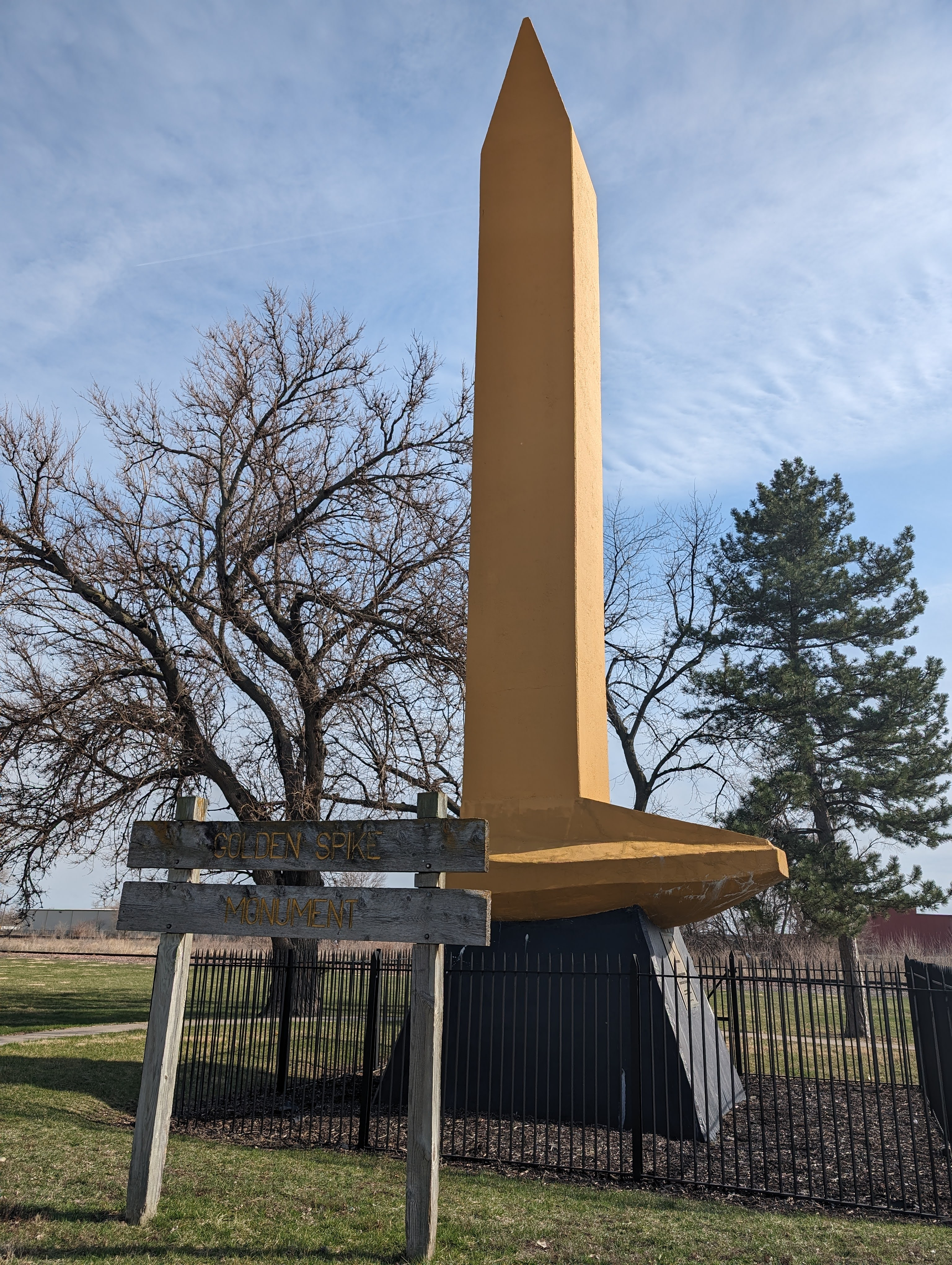
The Golden Spike monument located in Council Bluffs, Iowa at the Eastern Terminus of the Union Pacific Railroad.

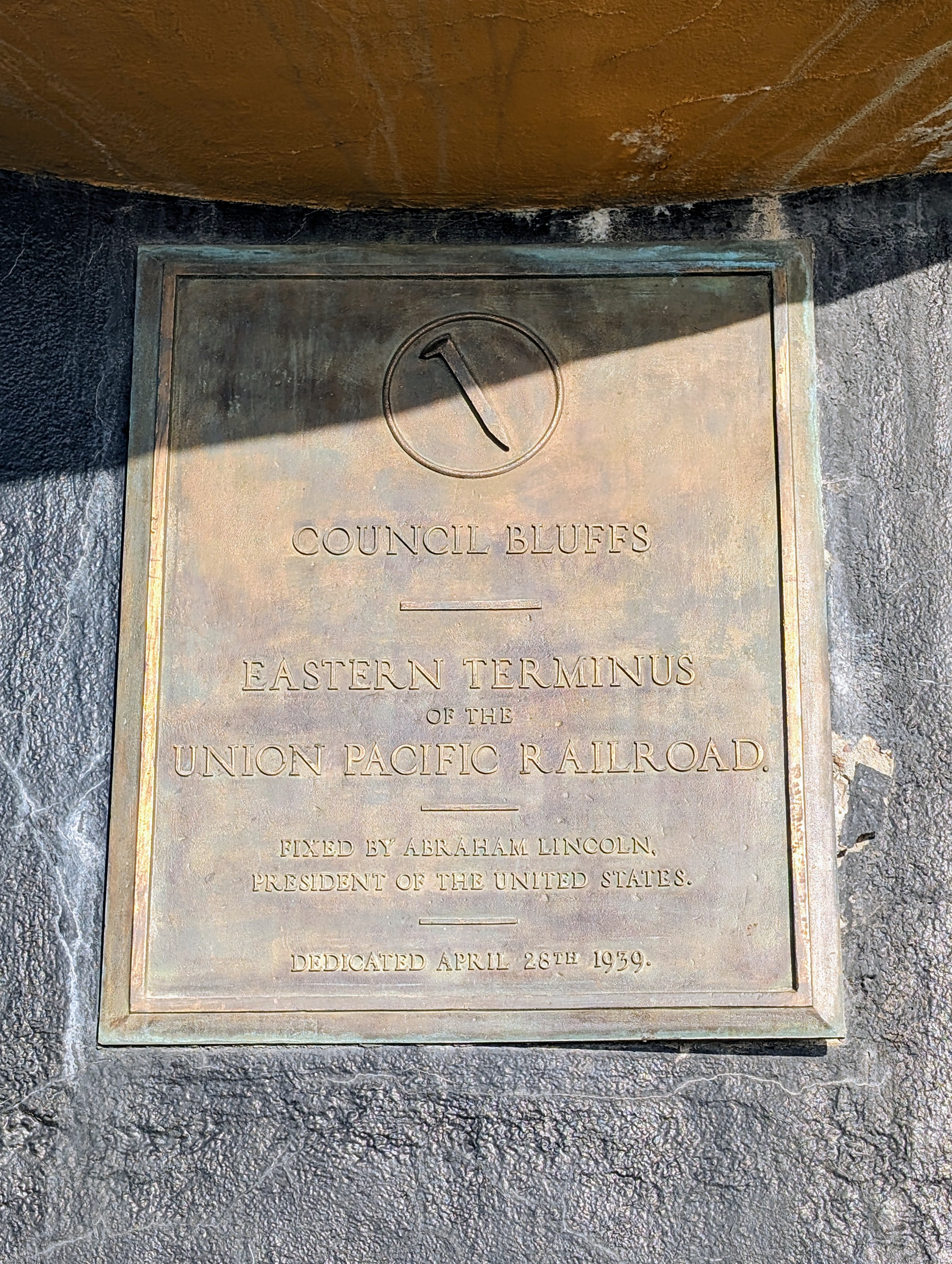
Plaque fixed to the Golden Spike monument.

== Key people ==
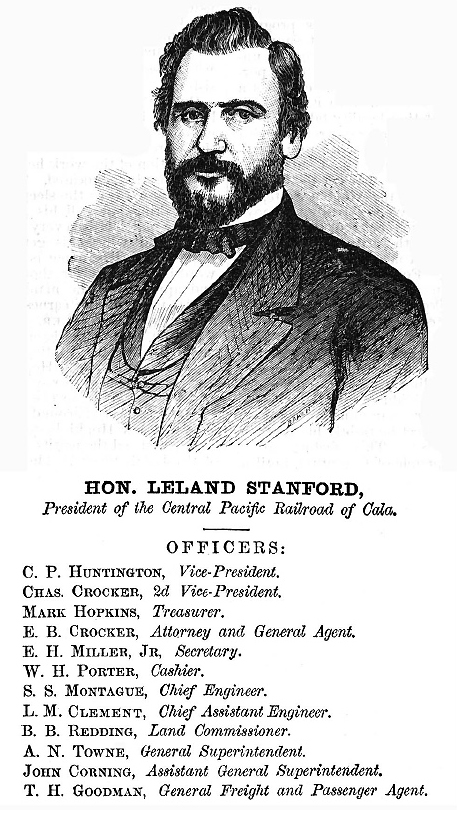
Leland Stanford and the officers of the CPRR in 1870

=== Asa Whitney ===
One of the most prominent champions of the central route railroad was Asa Whitney. He envisioned a route from Chicago and the Great Lakes to northern California, paid for by the sale of land to settlers along the route. Whitney traveled widely to solicit support from businessmen and politicians, printed maps and pamphlets, and submitted several proposals to Congress, all at his own expense. In June 1845, he led a team along part of the proposed route to assess its feasibility.

Legislation to begin construction of the Pacific Railroad (called the Memorial of Asa Whitney) was first introduced to Congress by Representative Zadock Pratt. Congress did not immediately act on Whitney's proposal.

=== Theodore Judah ===
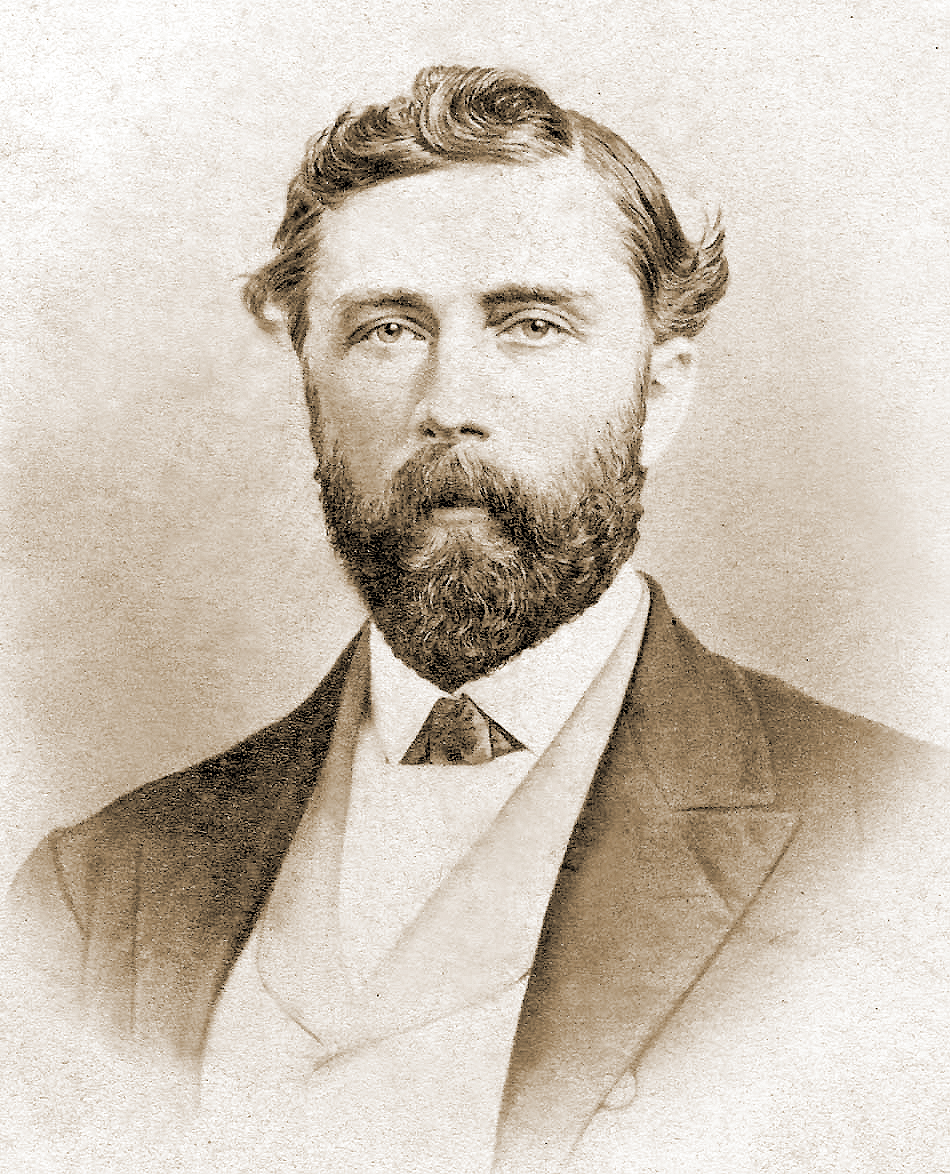
Theodore Judah, architect of the transcontinental railroad and first chief engineer of the Central Pacific

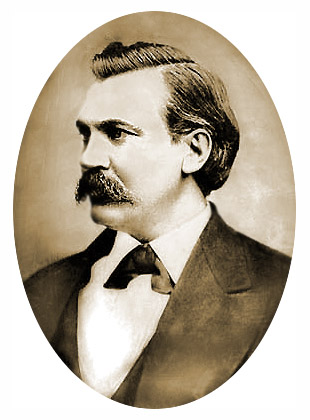
Lewis M. Clement, Chief Assistant Engineer and Superintendent of Track

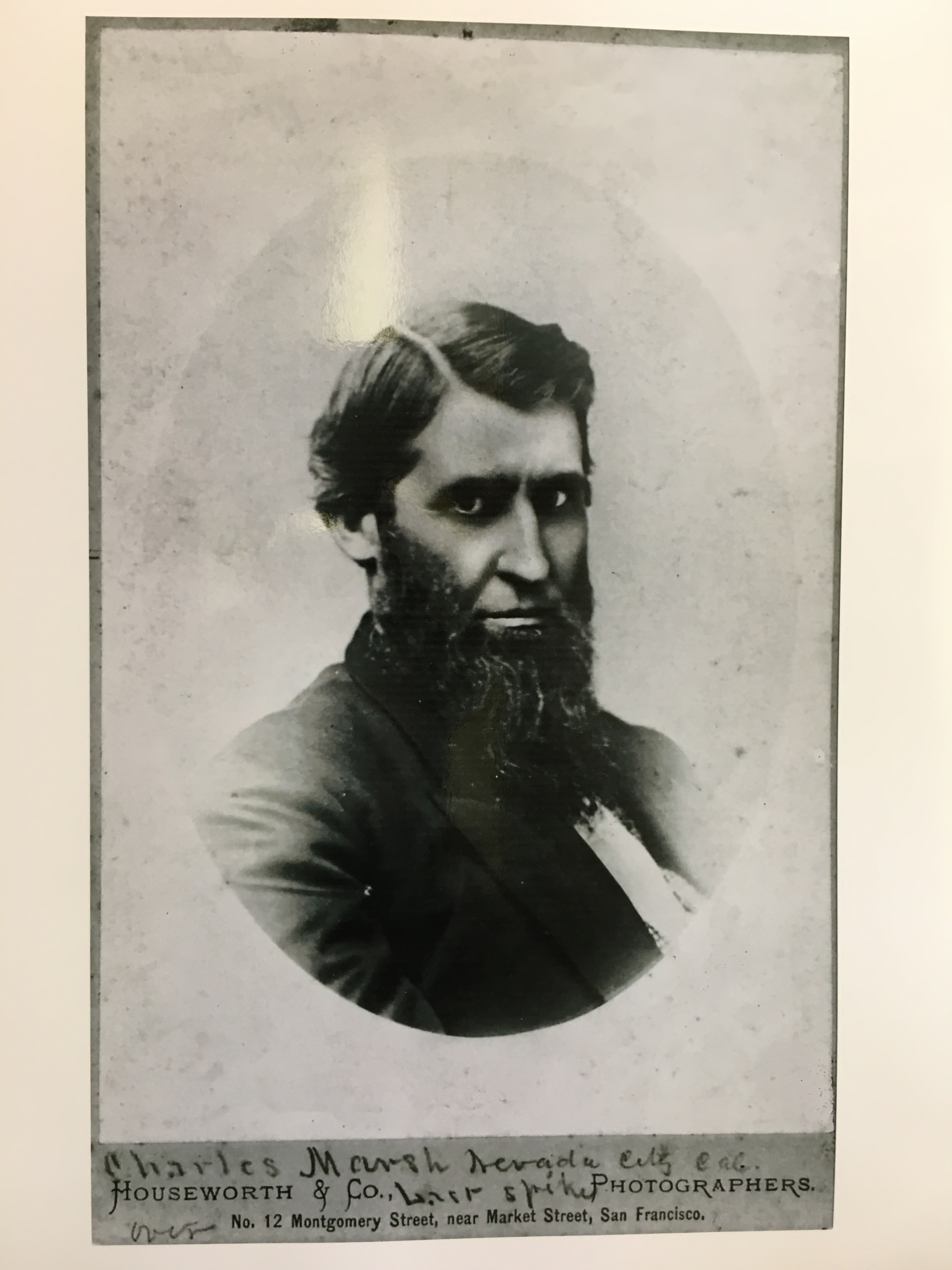
Charles Marsh was the leading expert on the topography in the part of the Sierra Nevada Mountains where the Central Pacific Railroad was to be built. He was a civil engineer, and founding investor and member of the board of directors of the Central Pacific.

Theodore Judah was a fervent supporter of the central route railroad. He lobbied vigorously in favor of the project and undertook the survey of the route through the rugged Sierra Nevada, one of the chief obstacles of the project.

In 1852, Judah was chief engineer for the newly formed Sacramento Valley Railroad, the first railroad built west of the Mississippi River. Although the railroad later went bankrupt once the easy placer gold deposits around Placerville, California, were depleted, Judah was convinced that a properly financed railroad could pass from Sacramento through the Sierra Nevada mountains to reach the Great Basin and hook up with rail lines coming from the East.

In 1856, Judah wrote a 13,000-word proposal in support of a Pacific railroad and distributed it to Cabinet secretaries, congressmen and other influential people. In September 1859, Judah was chosen to be the accredited lobbyist for the Pacific Railroad Convention, which indeed approved his plan to survey, finance and engineer the road. Judah returned to Washington in December 1859. He had a lobbying office in the United States Capitol, received an audience with President James Buchanan, and represented the Convention before Congress.

Judah returned to California in 1860. He continued to search for a more practical route through the Sierra suitable for a railroad. In mid-1860, local miner Daniel Strong had surveyed a route over the Sierra for a wagon toll road, which he realized would also suit a railroad. He described his discovery in a letter to Judah. Also in 1860, Charles Marsh, a surveyor, civil engineer and water company owner, met with civil engineer Judah. Marsh, who had already surveyed a potential railroad route between Sacramento and Nevada City, California, a decade earlier, went with Judah into the Sierra Nevada Mountains. There they examined the Henness Pass Turnpike Company's route (Marsh was a founding director of that company). They measured elevations and distances and discussed the possibility of a transcontinental railroad. Both were convinced that it could be done. Judah, Marsh and Strong then met with merchants and businessmen to solicit investors in their proposed railroad.

From January or February 1861 until July, Judah and Strong led a 10-person expedition to survey the route for the railroad over the Sierra Nevada through Clipper Gap and Emigrant Gap, over Donner Pass, and south to Truckee. They discovered a way across the Sierras that was gradual enough to be made suitable for a railroad, although it still needed a lot of work.

=== The Big Four ===
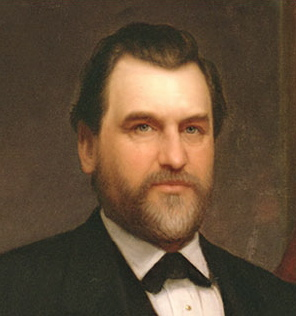
Leland Stanford's official gubernatorial portrait

Four northern California businessmen formed the Central Pacific Railroad: Leland Stanford, (1824–1893), President; Collis Potter Huntington, (1821–1900), Vice President; Mark Hopkins, (1813–1878), Treasurer; Charles Crocker, (1822–1888), Construction Supervisor. All became substantially wealthy from their association with the railroad. Judah, Marsh, Strong, Stanford, Huntington, Hopkins and Crocker, along with James Bailey and Lucius Anson Booth, became the first board of directors of the Central Pacific Railroad.

=== Thomas Durant ===
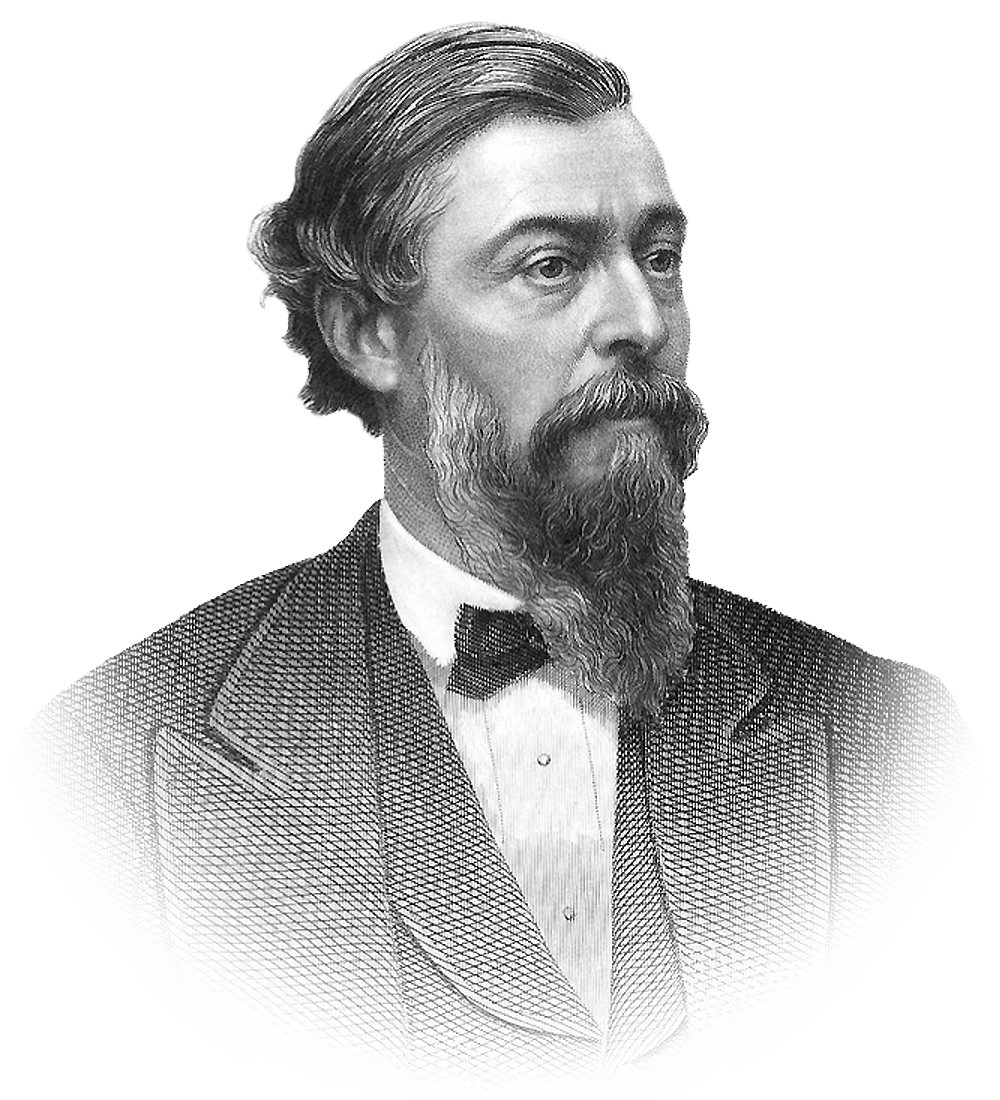
Dr. Thomas C. Durant

Former ophthalmologist Dr. Thomas Clark "Doc" Durant was nominally only a vice president of Union Pacific, so he installed a series of respected men like John Adams Dix as president of the railroad. While serving as vice president of Union Pacific he would be a key figure in the Crédit Mobilier scandal which ultimately led to his removal from the company.

=== Grenville M. Dodge ===
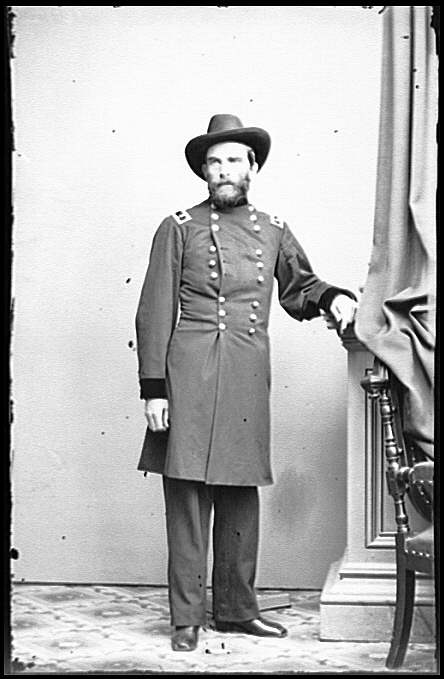
Maj. Gen. Grenville M. Dodge

Major General Grenville M. Dodge served as the chief engineer of Union Pacific during the construction of the First Transcontinental Railroad. In 1865 while fighting against Native-American tribes he would discover a pass in the Laramie Mountains, which would serve as a vital passage for the First Transcontinental Railroad. Dodge would serve in the United States House of Representatives for Iowa's 5th District from 1867 until 1869. During this time he would push for legislation to help the construction of the railroad.

== Authorization and funding ==
In February 1860, Iowa Representative Samuel Curtis introduced a bill to fund the railroad. It passed the House but died when it could not be reconciled with the Senate version because of opposition from southern states who wanted a southern route near the 42nd parallel. Curtis tried and failed again in 1861. After the southern states seceded from the Union, the House of Representatives approved the bill on May 6, 1862, and the Senate on June 20. Lincoln signed the Pacific Railroad Act of 1862 into law on July 1. It authorized creation of two companies, the Central Pacific in the west and the Union Pacific in the mid-west, to build the railroad. The legislation called for building and operating a new railroad from the Missouri River at Council Bluffs, Iowa, west to Sacramento, California, and on to San Francisco Bay. Another act to supplement the first was passed in 1864. The Pacific Railroad Act of 1863 established the standard gauge to be used in these federally financed railways.

=== Federal financing ===
To finance the project, the act authorized the federal government to issue 30-year U.S. government bonds (at 6% interest). The railroad companies were paid $16,000 per mile (approximately $573,000 per mile today) for track laid on a level grade, $32,000 per mile (about $1,147,000 per mile today) for track laid in foothills, and $48,000 per mile (or about $1,720,000 per mile today) for track laid in mountains. The two railroad companies sold similar amounts of company-backed bonds and stock.

=== Union Pacific financing ===
While the federal legislation for the Union Pacific required that no partner was to own more than 10 percent of the stock, the Union Pacific had problems selling its stock. One of the few subscribers was the Church of Jesus Christ of Latter-day Saints leader Brigham Young, who also supplied crews for building much of the railroad through Utah.

Durant manipulated market prices on his stocks by spreading rumors about which railroads he had an interest in were being considered for connection with the Union Pacific. First he touted rumors that his fledgling M&M Railroad had a deal in the works, while secretly buying stock in the depressed Cedar Rapids and Missouri Railroad. Then he circulated rumors that the CR&M had plans to connect to the Union Pacific, at which point he began buying back the M&M stock at depressed prices. It is estimated his scams produced over $5 million in profits for him and his cohorts.

=== Central Pacific financing ===
Collis Huntington, a Sacramento hardware merchant, heard Judah's presentation about the railroad at the St. Charles Hotel in November 1860. He invited Judah to his office to hear his proposal in detail. Huntington persuaded Judah to accept financing from himself and four others: Mark Hopkins, his business partner; James Bailey, a jeweler; Leland Stanford, a grocer; and Charles Crocker, a dry-goods merchant. They initially invested $1,500 each and formed a board of directors. These investors became known as The Big Four, and their railroad was called the Central Pacific Railroad. Each eventually made millions of dollars from their investments and control of the Central Pacific Railroad.

Before major construction could begin, Judah traveled back to New York City to raise funds to buy out The Big Four. Shortly after arriving in New York, Judah died on November 2, 1863, of yellow fever that he had contracted while traveling over the Panama Railroad's transit of the Isthmus of Panama. The CPRR Engineering Department was taken over by his successor Samuel S. Montegue, as well as Canadian trained Chief Assistant Engineer (later Acting Chief Engineer) Lewis Metzler Clement who also became Superintendent of Track.

=== Land grants ===
To allow the companies to raise additional capital, Congress granted the railroads a 200-foot (61 m) right-of-way corridor, lands for additional facilities like sidings and maintenance yards. They were also granted alternate sections of government-owned lands—6,400 acres (2,600 ha) per mile (1.6 km)—for 10 miles (16 km) on both sides of the track, forming a checkerboard pattern. The railroad companies were given the odd-numbered sections while the federal government retained the even-numbered sections. The exception was in cities, at rivers, or on non-government property. The railroads sold bonds based on the value of the lands, and in areas with good land like the Sacramento Valley and Nebraska sold the land to settlers, contributing to a rapid settlement of the West. The total area of the land grants to the Union Pacific and Central Pacific was larger than the area of the state of Texas: federal government land grants totaled about 130,000,000 acres, and state government land grants totaled about 50,000,000 acres.

It was far from a given that the railroads operating in the thinly-settled west would make enough money to repay their construction and operation. If the railroad companies failed to sell the land granted them within three years, they were required to sell it at prevailing government price for homesteads: $1.25 per acre ($3.09/ha). If they failed to repay the bonds, all remaining railroad property, including trains and tracks, would revert to the U.S. government. To encourage settlement in the west, Congress (1861–1863) passed the Homestead Acts which granted an applicant 160 acres (65 ha) of land with the requirement that the applicant improve the land. This incentive encouraged thousands of settlers to move west.

In return for the land grants, the railroads were required to haul government personnel and cargo at significantly reduced rates (generally half of the normal rate). In addition, the land was granted in a checkerboard fashion, with the government retaining every other section. The land that the government retained typically doubled in value as a result of the railroad being built. The land grants were a good deal for the government.

The government guaranteed loans to several Pacific railroads, which were all paid off by 1899 ($63 million in principal, and $105 million in interest). After receiving rate discounts of approximately 50% on government personnel and cargo for 80 years (including during two world wars), Congress finally discontinued the rate reductions at the end of World War II. The land grants had been more than paid for (several times over).

=== Railroad self-dealing ===
The federal legislation lacked adequate oversight and accountability. The two companies took advantage of these weaknesses in the legislation to manipulate the project and produce extra profit for themselves. Despite the generous subsidies offered by the federal government, the railroad capitalists knew they would not turn a profit on the railroad business for many months, possibly years. They determined to make a profit on the construction itself. Both groups of financiers formed independent companies to complete the project, and they controlled management of the new companies along with the railroad ventures. This self-dealing allowed them to build in generous profit margins paid out by the railroad companies. In the west, the four men heading the Central Pacific chose a simple name for their company, the "Contract and Finance Company." In the east, the Union Pacific selected a foreign name, calling their construction firm "Crédit Mobilier of America." The latter company was later implicated in a far-reaching scandal which would greatly affect the railroad's purpose, described later.

Also, the lack of federal oversight provided both companies with incentives to continue building their railroads past one other, since they were each being paid, and receiving land grants, based on how many miles of track they laid, even though only one track would eventually be used. This tacitly-agreed profiteering activity was captured (probably accidentally) by Union Pacific photographer Andrew J. Russell in his images of the Promontory Trestle construction.

=== Labor and wages ===
Many of the civil engineers and surveyors who were hired by the Union Pacific had been employed during the American Civil War to repair and operate the over 2,000 miles (3,200 km) of railroad line the U.S. Military Railroad controlled by the end of the war. The Union Pacific also utilized their experience repairing and building truss bridges during the war. Most of the semi-skilled workers on the Union Pacific were recruited from the many soldiers discharged from the Union and Confederate armies along with emigrant Irishmen.

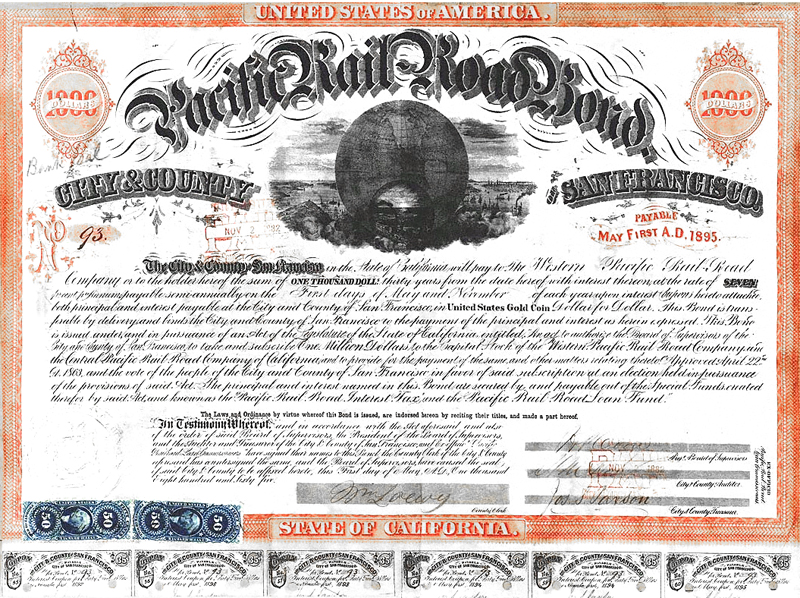
Pacific Railroad Bond, City and County of San Francisco, 1865

After 1864, the Central Pacific Railroad received the same Federal financial incentives as the Union Pacific Railroad, along with some construction bonds granted by the state of California and the city of San Francisco. The Central Pacific hired some Canadian and European civil engineers and surveyors with extensive experience building railroads, but it had a difficult time finding semi-skilled labor. Most Caucasians in California preferred to work in the mines or agriculture. The railroad experimented by hiring local emigrant Chinese as manual laborers, many of whom were escaping the poverty and terrors of the war (especially the Punti–Hakka Clan Wars) in the Sze Yup districts in the Pearl River Delta of Guangdong province in China. When they proved themselves as workers, the CPRR from that point forward preferred to hire Chinese, and even set up recruiting efforts in Canton. Despite their small stature and lack of experience, the Chinese laborers were responsible for most of the heavy manual labor since only a very limited amount of that work could be done by animals, simple machines, or black powder. The railroad also hired some black people escaping the aftermath of the American Civil War. Most of the black and white workers were paid $30 per month and given food and lodging. Most Chinese were initially paid $31 per month and provided lodging, but they preferred to cook their own meals. In 1867 the CPRR raised their wage to $35 (equivalent to $810 in 2025) per month after a strike. CPRR came to see the advantage of good workers employed at low wages: "Chinese labor proved to be Central Pacific's salvation."

White workers suffered from dysentery more than Chinese when they built the American transcontinental railroad in the 19th century since Chinese consumed boiled water. Chinese workers also kept hot water for bathing every day.

== Transcontinental route ==
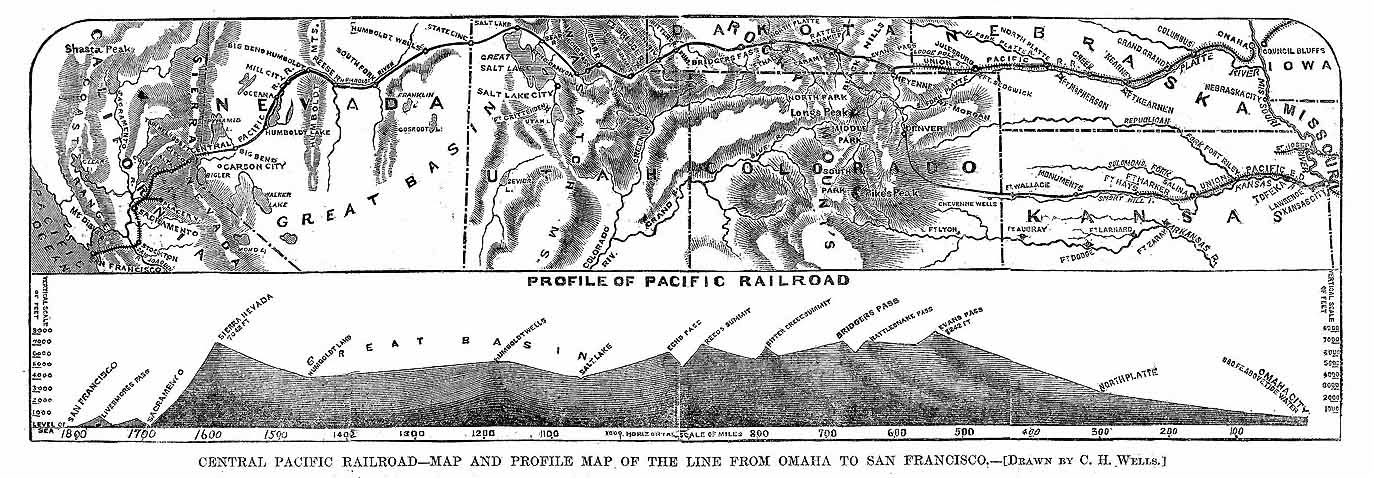
Profile of the Pacific Railroad from Council Bluffs/Omaha to San Francisco. Harper's Weekly December 7, 1867

=== Construction begun ===
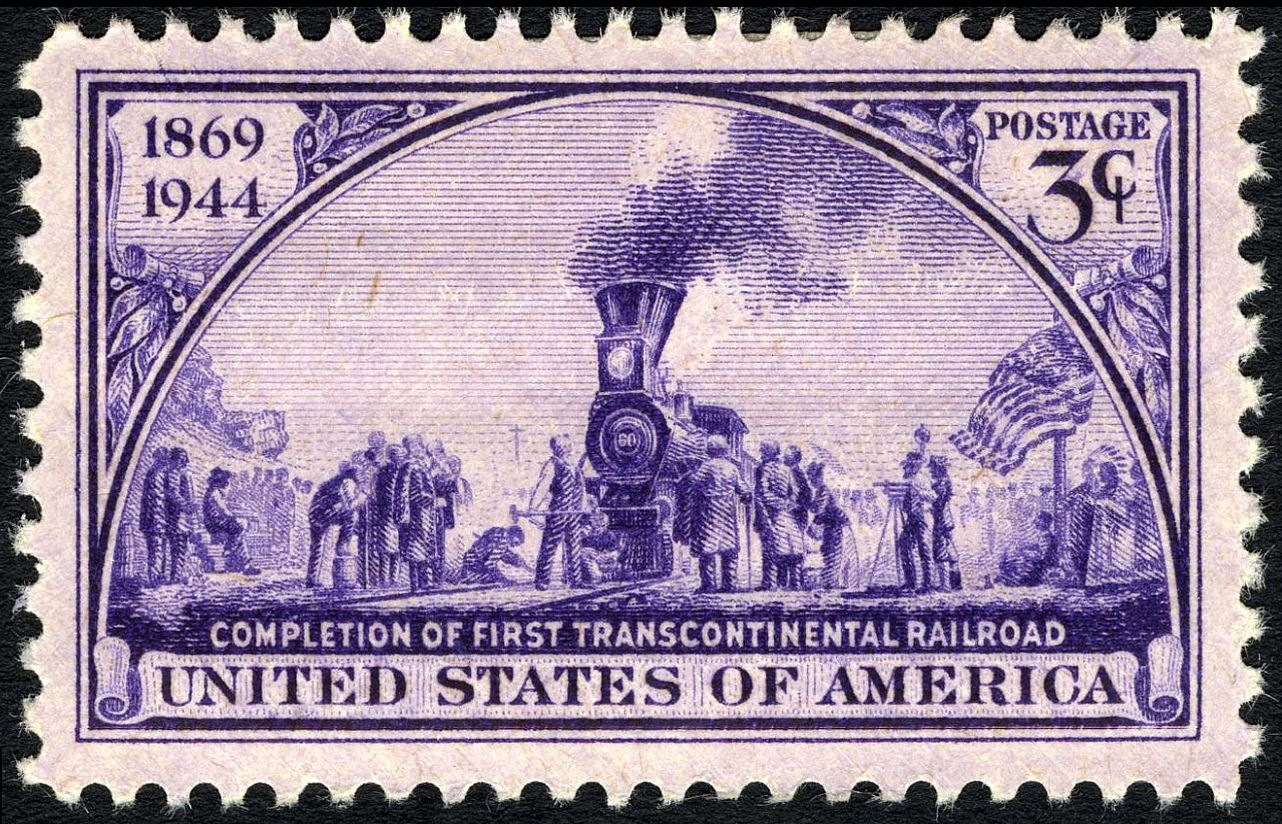
The U.S. Post Office issued a postage stamp in 1944 commemorating the 75th anniversary of the first transcontinental railroad in America. The engraving depicts the driving of the 'Golden Spike' at Promontory, Utah, where the Union Pacific and Central Pacific railroads came together in 1869.

The Central Pacific broke ground on January 8, 1863. Because of insufficient transportation alternatives from the manufacturing centers on the east coast, virtually all of their tools and machinery, including rails, railroad switches, railroad turntables, freight and passenger cars, and steam locomotives, were transported first by train to east coast ports. They were then loaded on ships which either sailed around South America's Cape Horn, or offloaded the cargo at the Isthmus of Panama, where it was sent across via paddle steamer and the Panama Railroad. The Panama Railroad gauge was 5 feet (1,524 mm), which was incompatible with the 4-foot-8 1/2-inch (1,435 mm) gauge used by the CPRR equipment. The latter route was about twice as expensive per pound. Once the machinery and tools reached the San Francisco Bay area, they were put aboard river paddle steamers which transported them up the final 130 miles (210 km) of the Sacramento River to the new state capital in Sacramento. Many of these steam engines, railroad cars, and other machinery were shipped dismantled and had to be reassembled. Wooden timbers for railroad ties, trestles, bridges, firewood, and telegraph poles were harvested in California and transported to the project site.

The Union Pacific Railroad did not start construction for another 18 months until July 1865. They were delayed by difficulties obtaining financial backing and the unavailability of workers and materials due to the Civil War. Their start point in the new city of Omaha, Nebraska, was not yet connected via railroad to Council Bluffs, Iowa. Equipment needed to begin work was initially delivered to Omaha and Council Bluffs by paddle steamers on the Missouri River.

After the American Civil War ended in 1865, the Union Pacific still competed for railroad supplies with companies who were building or repairing railroads in the south, and prices rose.

=== Rail standards ===
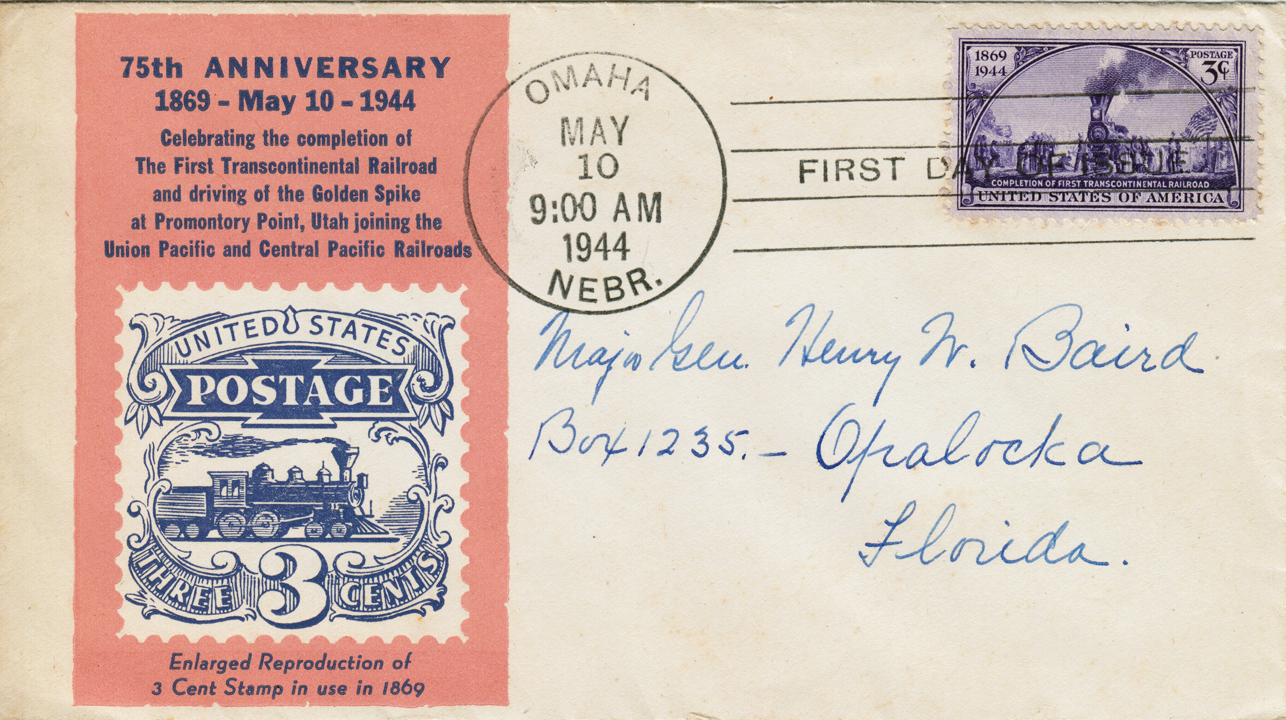
First Day Cover for the 75th Anniversary of the Driving of the Last Spike (May 10, 1944)

At that time in the United States, there were two primary standards for track gauge, as defined by the distance between the two rails. In Britain, the gauge was 4 ft 8 1/2 in (1,435 mm) standard gauge, and this had been adopted by the majority of northern railways. However, much of the south had adopted a 5 ft (1,524 mm) gauge. Transferring railway cars across a break of gauge required changing out the trucks. Alternatively, cargo was offloaded and reloaded, a time-consuming effort that delayed cargo shipments. For the transcontinental railroad, the builders adopted what is now known as the standard gauge.

The Bessemer process and open hearth furnace steel-making were in use by 1865, but the advantages of steel rails which lasted much longer than iron rails had not yet been demonstrated. The rails used initially in building the railway were nearly all made of an iron flat-bottomed modified I-beam profile weighing 56 or 66 pounds per yard (27.8 or 32.7 kg/m). The railroad companies were intent on completing the project as rapidly as possible at a minimum cost. Within a few years, nearly all railroads converted to steel rails.

=== Time zones and telegraph usage ===
Time was not standardized across the United States and Canada until November 18, 1883. In 1865, each railroad set its own time to minimize scheduling errors. To communicate easily up and down the line, the railroads built telegraph lines alongside the tracks. These lines eventually superseded the original First Transcontinental Telegraph which followed much of the Mormon Trail up the North Platte River and across the very thinly populated Central Nevada Route through central Utah and Nevada. The telegraph lines along the railroad were easier to protect and maintain. Many of the original telegraph lines were abandoned as the telegraph business was consolidated with the railroad telegraph lines.

=== Union Pacific route ===
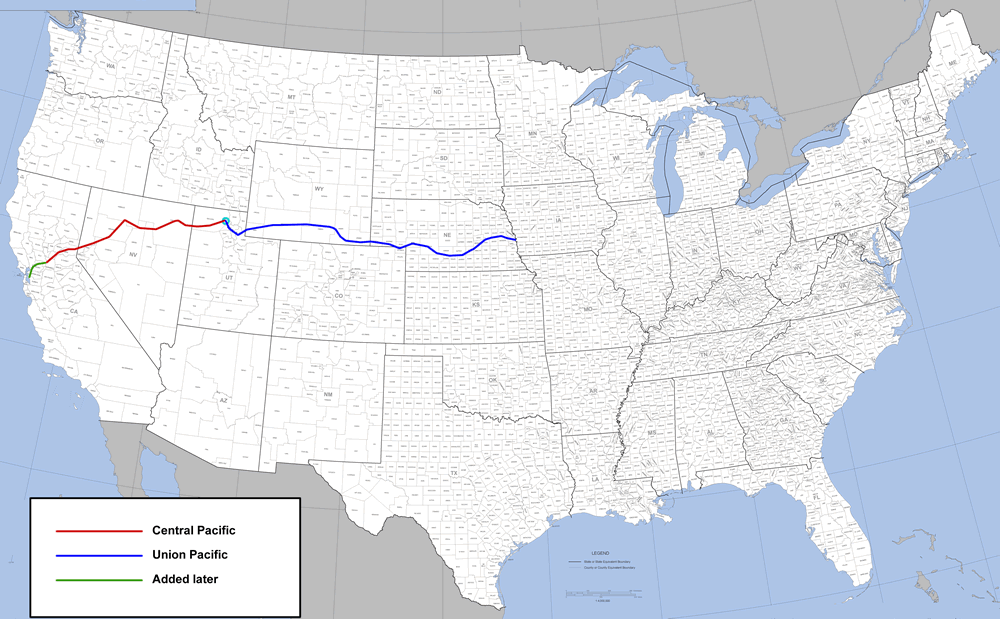
Route of the first American transcontinental railroad from Sacramento, California, to Council Bluffs, Iowa. Other railroads connected at Council Bluffs to cities throughout the East and Midwest.

The Union Pacific's 1,087 miles (1,749 km) of track started at MP 0.0 in Council Bluffs, Iowa, on the eastern side of the Missouri River. Omaha was chosen by President Abraham Lincoln as the location of its Transfer Depot where up to seven railroads could transfer mail and other goods to Union Pacific trains bound for the west.

Trains were initially transported across the Missouri River by ferry before they could access the western tracks beginning in Omaha, Nebraska Territory. The river froze in the winter, and the ferries were replaced by sleighs. A bridge was not built until 1872, when the 2,750-foot-long (840 m) Union Pacific Missouri River Bridge was completed.

After the rail line's initial climb through the Missouri River bluffs west of Omaha and out of the Missouri River Valley, the route bridged the Elkhorn River and then crossed over the new 1,500-foot (460 m) Loup River bridge as it followed the north side of the Platte River valley west through Nebraska along the general path of the Oregon, Mormon and California Trails.

By December 1865, the Union Pacific had only completed 40 miles (64 km) of track, reaching Fremont, Nebraska, and a further 10 miles (16 km) of roadbed.

At the end of 1865, Peter A. Dey, Chief Engineer of the Union Pacific, resigned over a routing dispute with Thomas C. Durant, one of the chief financiers of the Union Pacific.

With the end of the Civil War and increased government supervision in the offing, Durant hired his former M&M engineer Grenville M. Dodge to build the railroad, and the Union Pacific began a mad dash west.

Former Union General John "Jack" Casement was hired as the new Chief Engineer of the Union Pacific. He equipped several railroad cars to serve as portable bunkhouses for the workers and gathered men and supplies to push the railroad rapidly west. Among the bunkhouses, Casement added a galley car to prepare meals, and he even provided for a herd of cows to be moved with the railhead and bunk cars to provide fresh meat. Hunters were hired to provide buffalo meat from the large herds of American bison.

The small survey parties who scouted ahead to locate the roadbed were sometimes attacked and killed by raiding Native Americans. In response, the U.S. Army instituted active cavalry patrols that grew larger as the Native Americans grew more aggressive. Temporary, "Hell on wheels" towns, made mostly of canvas tents, accompanied the railroad as construction headed west.

The Platte River was too shallow and meandering to provide river transport, but the Platte river valley headed west and sloped up gradually at about 6 feet per mile (1.1 m/km), often allowing to lay a mile (1.6 km) of track a day or more in 1866 as the Union Pacific finally started moving rapidly west. Building bridges to cross creeks and rivers was the main source of delays. Near where the Platte River splits into the North Platte River and South Platte River, the railroad bridged the North Platte River over a 2,600-foot-long (790 m) bridge (nicknamed ½ mile bridge). It was built across the shallow but wide North Platte resting on piles driven by steam pile drivers. Here they built the "railroad" town of North Platte, Nebraska, in December 1866 after completing about 240 miles (390 km) of track that year. In late 1866, former Major General Grenville M. Dodge was appointed Chief Engineer on the Union Pacific, but hard-working General "Jack" Casement continued to work as chief construction "boss" and his brother Daniel Casement continued as a financial officer.

The original emigrant route across Wyoming of the Oregon, Mormon and California Trails, after progressing up the Platte River valley, went up the North Platte River valley through Casper, Wyoming, along the Sweetwater River and over the Continental Divide at the 7,412-foot (2,259 m) South Pass. The original westward travelers in their ox and mule pulled wagons tried to stick to river valleys to avoid as much road building as possible—gradients and sharp corners were usually of little or no concern to them. The ox and mule pulled wagons were the original off-road vehicles in their day since nearly all of the Emigrant Trails went cross country over rough, unimproved trails. The route over South Pass's main advantage for wagons pulled by oxen or mules was a shorter elevation over an "easy" pass to cross and its "easy" connection to nearby river valleys on both sides of the continental divide for water and grass. The emigrant trails were closed in winter. The North Platte–South Pass route was far less beneficial for a railroad, as it was about 150 miles (240 km) longer and much more expensive to construct up the narrow, steep and rocky canyons of the North Platte. The route along the North Platte was also further from Denver, Colorado, and went across difficult terrain, while a railroad connection to that City was already being planned for and surveyed.

Efforts to survey a new, shorter, "better" route had been underway since 1864. By 1867, a new route was found and surveyed that went along part of the South Platte River in western Nebraska and after entering what is now the state of Wyoming, ascended a gradual sloping ridge between Lodgepole Creek and Crow Creek to the 8,200-foot (2,500 m) Evans Pass (also called Sherman's Pass) which was discovered by the Union Pacific employed English surveyor and engineer, James Evans, in the Great Divide Basin in about 1864. This pass is now marked by the Ames Monument (41.1311°N 105.3982°W), commemorating two of the main backers of the Union Pacific Railroad, and the ghost town of Sherman. From North Platte, Nebraska (elevation 2,834 feet or 864 metres), the railroad proceeded westward and upward along a new path across the Nebraska Territory and Wyoming Territory (then part of the Dakota Territory) along the north bank of the South Platte River and into what would become the state of Wyoming at Lone Pine, Wyoming. Evans Pass was located between what would become the new "railroad" towns of Cheyenne and Laramie. Connecting to this pass, about 15 miles (24 km) west of Cheyenne, was the one place across the Laramie Mountains that had a narrow "guitar neck" of land that crossed the mountains without serious erosion at the so-called "gangplank" (41°6′0″N 105°9′9″W) discovered by Major General Grenville Dodge in 1865 when he was in the U.S. Army. The new route surveyed across Wyoming was over 150 miles (240 km) shorter, had a flatter profile, allowing for cheaper and easier railroad construction, and also went closer by Denver and the known coalfields in the Wasatch and Laramie Ranges.

The railroad gained about 3,200 feet (980 m) in the 220 miles (350 km) climb to Cheyenne from North Platte, Nebraska—about 15 feet per mile (2.8 m/km)—a very gentle slope of less than one degree average. This "new" route had never become an emigrant route because it lacked the water and grass to feed the emigrants' oxen and mules. Steam locomotives did not need grass, and the railroad companies could drill wells for water if necessary.

Coal had been discovered in Wyoming and reported on by John C. Frémont in his 1843 expedition across Wyoming, and was already being exploited by Utah residents from towns like Coalville, Utah, and later Kemmerer, Wyoming, by the time the Transcontinental railroad was built. Union Pacific needed coal to fuel its steam locomotives on the almost treeless plains across Nebraska and Wyoming. Coal shipments by rail were also looked on as a potentially major source of income—this potential is still being realized.

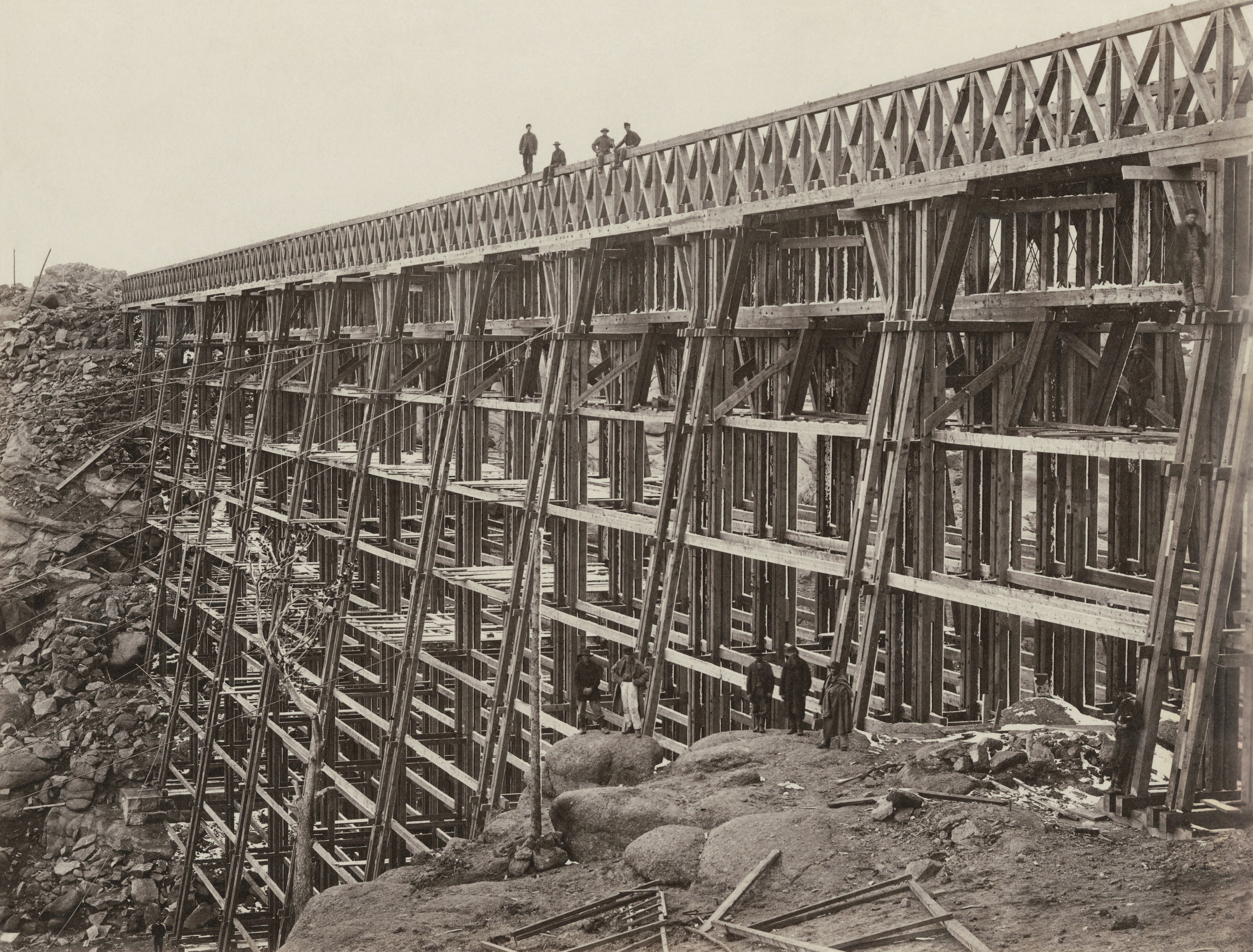
Dale Creek Bridge

The Union Pacific reached the new railroad town of Cheyenne in December 1867, having laid about 270 miles (430 km) that year. They paused over the winter, preparing to push the track over Evans (Sherman's) Pass. At 8,247 feet (2,514 m), Evans Pass was the highest point reached on the transcontinental railroad. About 4 miles (6.4 km) beyond Evans pass, the railroad had to build an extensive bridge over the Dale Creek canyon (41°6′14″N 105°27′17″W). The Dale Creek Crossing was one of their more difficult railroad engineering challenges. Dale Creek Bridge was 650 feet (200 m) long and 125 feet (38 m) above Dale Creek. The bridge components were pre-built of timber in Chicago, Illinois, and then shipped on rail cars to Dale Creek for assembly. The eastern and western approaches to the bridge site, near the highest elevation on the transcontinental railroad, required cutting through granite for nearly a mile on each side. The initial Dale Creek bridge had a train speed limit of 4 miles (6.4 km) per hour across the bridge. Beyond Dale Creek, railroad construction paused at what became the town of Laramie, Wyoming, to build a bridge across the Laramie River.

Located 35 miles (56 km) from Evans pass, Union Pacific connected the new "railroad" town of Cheyenne to Denver and its Denver Pacific Railway and Telegraph Company railroad line in 1870. Elevated 6,070 feet (1,850 m) above sea level, and sitting on the new Union Pacific route with a connection to Denver, Cheyenne was chosen to become a major railroad center and was equipped with extensive railroad yards, maintenance facilities, and a Union Pacific presence. Its location made it a good base for helper locomotives to couple to trains with snowplows to help clear the tracks of snow or help haul heavy freight over Evans pass. The Union Pacific's junction with the Denver Railroad with its connection to Kansas City, Kansas, Kansas City, Missouri, and the railroads east of the Missouri River again increased Cheyenne's importance as the junction of two major railroads. Cheyenne later became Wyoming's largest city and the capital of the new state of Wyoming.

The railroad established many townships along the way: Fremont, Elkhorn, Grand Island, North Platte, Ogallala and Sidney as the railroad followed the Platte River across Nebraska territory. The railroad even dipped into what would become the new state of Colorado after crossing the North Platte River as it followed the South Platte River west into what would become Julesburg before turning northwest along Lodgepole Creek into Wyoming. In the Dakota Territory (Wyoming) the new towns of Cheyenne, Laramie, Rawlins (named for Union General John Aaron Rawlins, who camped in the locality in 1867), Green River and Evanston (named after James Evans) were established, as well as many more fuel and water stops. The Continental Divide was crossed 29 mi (47 km) west of Rawlins, at what would become the site of a town named Creston. The Green River was crossed with a new bridge, and the new "railroad" town of Green River constructed there after the tracks reached the Green River on October 1, 1868—the last big river to cross.

On December 4, 1868, the Union Pacific reached Evanston, having laid almost 360 miles (580 km) of track over the Green River and the Laramie Plains that year. By 1871, Evanston became a significant maintenance shop town equipped to carry out extensive repairs on the cars and steam locomotives.

In the Utah Territory, the railroad once again diverted from the main emigrant trails to cross the Wasatch Mountains and went down the rugged Echo Canyon (Summit County, Utah) and Weber River canyon. To speed up construction as much as possible, Union Pacific contracted several thousand Mormon workers to cut, fill, trestle, bridge, blast and tunnel its way down the rugged Weber River Canyon to Ogden, Utah, ahead of the railroad construction. The Mormon and Union Pacific rail work was joined in the area of the present-day border between Utah and Wyoming. The longest of four tunnels built in Weber Canyon was 757-foot-long (231 m) Tunnel 2. Work on this tunnel started in October 1868 and was completed six months later. Temporary tracks were laid around it and Tunnels 3 (508 feet or 155 metres), 4 (297 feet or 91 metres) and 5 (579 feet or 176 metres) to continue work on the tracks west of the tunnels.

The tunnels were all made with the new dangerous nitroglycerine explosive, which expedited work but caused some fatal accidents. While building the railroad along the rugged Weber River Canyon, Mormon workers signed the Thousand Mile Tree which was a lone tree alongside the track 1,000 miles (1,600 km) from Omaha. A historic marker has been placed there.

The tracks reached Ogden, Utah, on March 8, 1869, although finishing work would continue on the tracks, tunnels and bridges in Weber Canyon for over a year. From Ogden, the railroad went north of the Great Salt Lake to Brigham City and Corinne using Mormon workers, before finally connecting with the Central Pacific Railroad at Promontory Summit in Utah territory on May 10, 1869. Some Union Pacific officers declined to pay the Mormons all of the agreed upon construction costs of the work through Weber Canyon, and beyond, claiming Union Pacific poverty despite the millions they had extracted through the Crédit Mobilier of America scandal. Only partial payment was secured through court actions against Union Pacific.

=== Central Pacific route ===
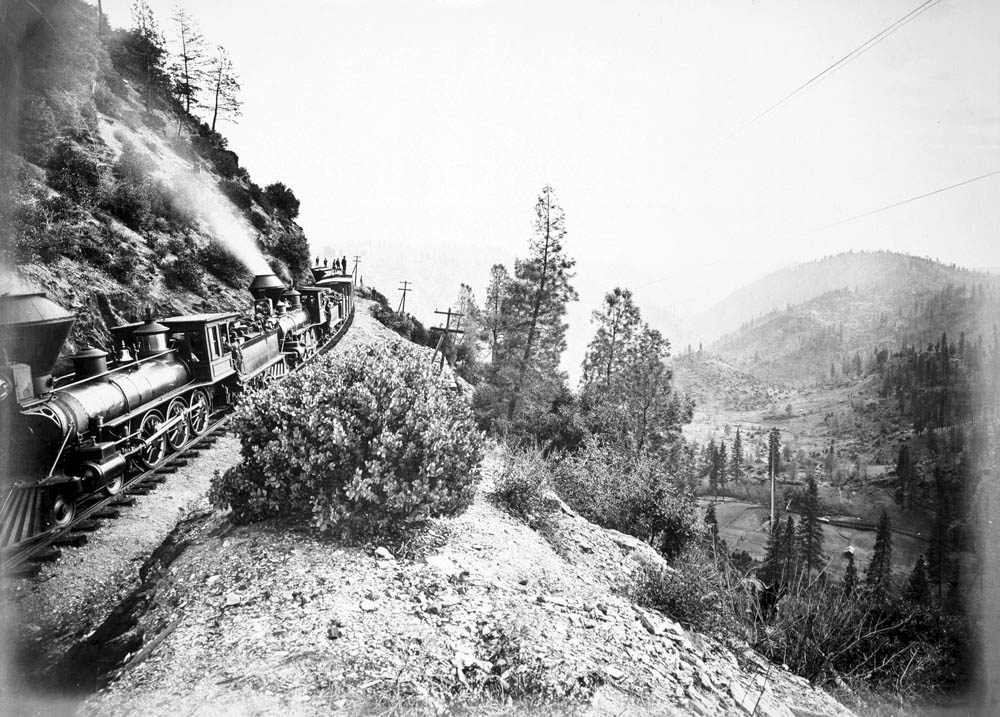
Central Pacific Railroad at Cape Horn c. 1880

The Central Pacific laid 690 miles (1,110 km) of track, starting in Sacramento, California, in 1863 and continuing over the rugged 7,000-foot (2,100 m) Sierra Nevada mountains at Donner Pass into the new state of Nevada. The elevation change from Sacramento (elev. 40 ft or 12 m) to Donner Summit (elev. 7,000 ft or 2,100 m) had to be accomplished in about 90 miles (140 km) with an average elevation change of 76 feet per mile (14 meters per km), and there were only a few places in the Sierra where this type of "ramp" existed. The discovery and detailed map survey with profiles and elevations of this route over the Sierra Nevada is credited to Theodore Judah, chief engineer of the Central Pacific Railroad until his death in 1863. This route is up a ridge between the North fork of the American River on the south and Bear and South Yuba Rivers on the north. As the railroad climbed out of Sacramento up to Donner Summit, there was only one 3-mile (4.8 km) section near "Cape Horn CPRR" where the railroad grade slightly exceeded two percent.

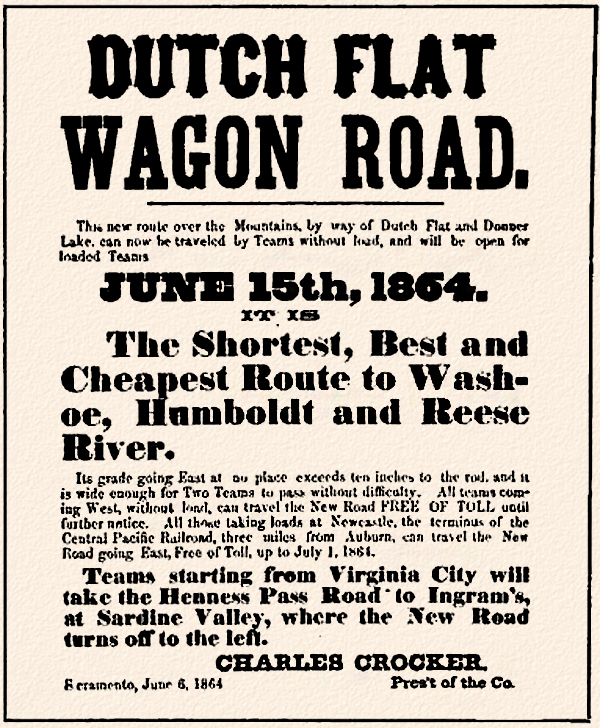
1864 advertisement for the opening of the Dutch Flat Wagon Road

In June 1864, the Central Pacific railroad entrepreneurs opened Dutch Flat and Donner Lake Wagon Road (DFDLWR). Costing about $300,000 and a years worth of work, this toll road wagon route was opened over much of the route the Central Pacific railroad (CPRR) would use over Donner Summit to carry freight and passengers needed by the CPRR and to carry other cargo over their toll road to and from the ever-advancing railhead and over the Sierra to the gold and silver mining towns of Nevada. As the railroad advanced, their freight rates with the combined rail and wagon shipments would become much more competitive. The volume of the toll road freight traffic to Nevada was estimated to be about $13,000,000 a year as the Comstock Lode boomed, and getting even part of this freight traffic would help pay for the railroad construction. When the railroad reached Reno, it had the majority of all Nevada freight shipments, and the price of goods in Nevada dropped significantly as the freight charges to Nevada dropped significantly. The rail route over the Sierras followed the general route of the Truckee branch of the California Trail, going east over Donner Pass and down the rugged Truckee River valley.

The route over the Sierra had been plotted out by Judah in preliminary surveys before his death in 1863. Judah's deputy, Samuel S. Montague was appointed as Central Pacific's new Chief Engineer, with Lewis M. Clement as Assistant Chief Engineer and Charles Cadwalader as second assistant. To build the new railroad, detailed surveys had to be run that showed where the cuts, fills, trestles, bridges and tunnels would have to be built. Work that was identified as taking a long time was started as soon as its projected track location could be ascertained and work crews, supplies and road work equipment found to be sent ahead. Tunnels, trestles and bridges were nearly all built this way. The spread-out nature of the work resulted in the work being split into two divisions, with L. M. Clement taking the upper division from Blue Cañon to Truckee and Cadwalader taking the lower division from Truckee to the Nevada border. Other assistant engineers were assigned to specific tasks such as building a bridge, tunnel or trestle which was done by the workers under experienced supervisors.

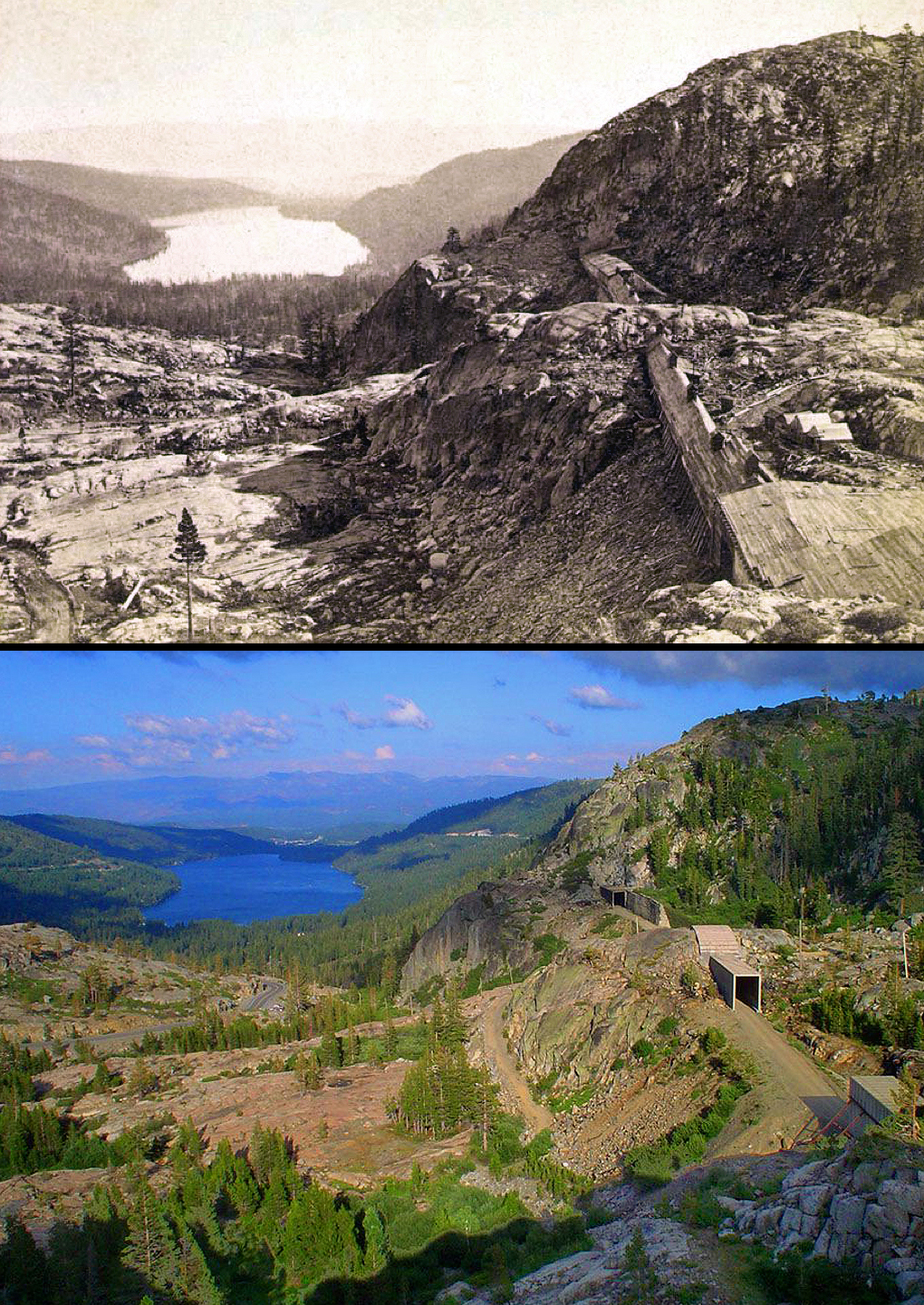
The CPRR grade at Donner Summit as it appeared in 1869 and 2003

In total, the Central Pacific had eleven tunnel projects (Nos. 3 through 13) under construction in the Sierra from 1865 to 1868, with seven tunnels located in a 2-mile (3.2 km) stretch on the east side of Donner Summit. The tunnels were usually built by drilling a series of holes in the tunnel face, filling them with black powder and detonating it to break the rock free. The black powder was provided by the California Powder Works near Santa Cruz, California. These works had started production in 1864 after the American Civil War had cut off shipments of black powder from the East to the mining and railroad industry of California and Nevada. The Central Pacific was a prolific user of black powder, often using up to 500 kegs of 25 pounds (11 kg) per day.

The summit tunnel (Number 6), 1,660 feet (510 m), was started in late 1865, well ahead of the railhead. Through solid granite, the summit tunnel progressed at a rate of only about 0.98 feet (0.30 m) per day per face as it was being worked by three eight-hour shifts of workers, hand drilling holes with a rock drill and hammer, filling them with black powder and trying to blast the granite loose. One crew worked drilling holes on the faces and another crew collected and removed the loosened rock after each explosion. The workers were pulled off the summit tunnel and the track grading east of Donner Pass in the winter of 1865–1866 as there was no way to supply them, nor quarters they could have lived in. The crews were transferred to work on bridges and track grading on the Truckee River canyon.

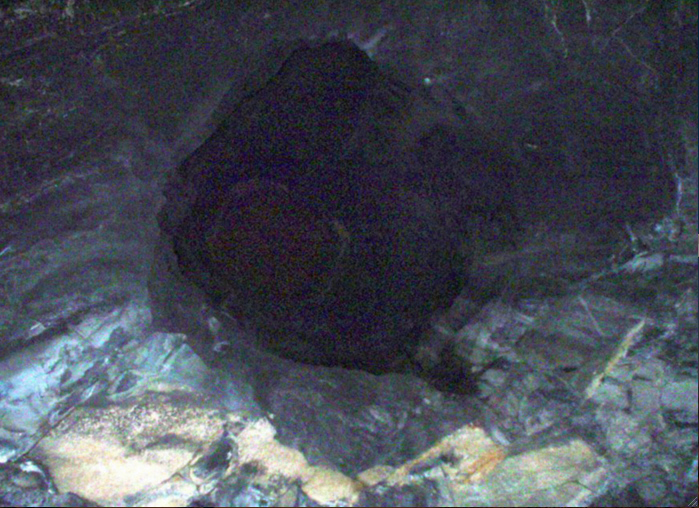
The vertical central shaft of the CPRR "Summit Tunnel" (Tunnel#6) at Donner Summit which allowed drilling and excavation to be carried out on four faces at once

In 1866, they put in a 125-foot (38 m) vertical shaft in the center of the summit tunnel and started work towards the east and west tunnel faces, giving four working faces on the summit tunnel to speed up progress. A steam engine off an old locomotive was brought up with much effort over the wagon road and used as a winch driver to help remove loosened rock from the vertical shaft and two working faces. By the winter of 1866–67, work had progressed sufficiently and a camp had been built for workers on the summit tunnel which allowed work to continue. The cross section of a tunnel face was a 16-foot-wide (4.9 m), 16-foot-high (4.9 m) oval with an 11-foot (3.4 m) vertical wall. Progress on the tunnel sped up to over 1.5 feet (0.46 m) per day per face when they started using the newly invented nitroglycerin—manufactured near the tunnel. They used nitroglycerin to deepen the summit tunnel to the required 16-foot (4.9 m) height after the four tunnel faces met, and made even faster progress. Nearly all other tunnels were worked on both tunnel faces and met in the middle. Depending on the material the tunnels penetrated, they were left unlined or lined with brick, rock walls or timber and post. Some tunnels were designed to bend in the middle to align with the track bed curvature. Despite this potential complication, nearly all the different tunnel center lines met within 2 inches (5 cm) or so. The detailed survey work that made these tunnel digs as precise as required was nearly all done by the Canadian-born and -trained Lewis Clement, the CPRR's Chief Assistant Engineer and Superintendent of Track, and his assistants.

Hills or ridges in front of the railroad road bed would have to have a flat-bottomed, V-shaped "cut" made to get the railroad through the ridge or hill. The type of material determined the slope of the V and how much material would have to be removed. Ideally, these cuts would be matched with valley fills that could use the dug out material to bring the road bed up to grade—cut and fill construction. In the 1860s there was no heavy equipment that could be used to make these cuts or haul it away to make the fills. The options were to dig it out by pick and shovel, haul the hillside material by wheelbarrow and/or horse or mule cart or blast it loose. To blast a V-shaped cut out, they had to drill several holes up to 20 feet (6.1 m) deep in the material, fill them with black powder, and blast the material away. Since the Central Pacific was in a hurry, they were profligate users of black powder to blast their way through the hills. The only disadvantage came when a nearby valley needed fill to get across it. The explosive technique often blew most of the potential fill material down the hillside, making it unavailable for fill. Initially, many valleys were bridged by "temporary" trestles that could be rapidly built and were later replaced by much lower maintenance and permanent solid fill. The existing railroad made transporting and putting material in valleys much easier—load it on railway dump cars, haul where needed and dump it over the side of the trestle.

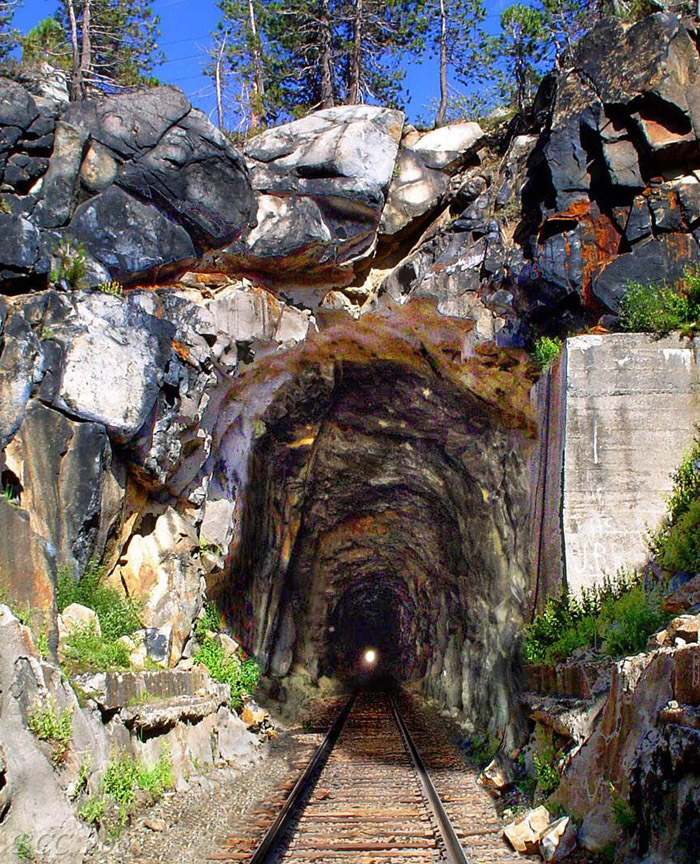
The Summit Tunnel at Donner Summit, West Portal (Composite image with the tracks removed in 1993 digitally restored)

The route down the eastern Sierras was done on the south side of Donner Lake with a series of switchbacks carved into the mountain. The Truckee River, which drains Lake Tahoe, had already found and scoured out the best route across the Carson Range of mountains east of the Sierras. The route down the rugged Truckee River Canyon, including required bridges, was done ahead of the main summit tunnel completion. To expedite the building of the railroad through the Truckee River canyon, the Central Pacific hauled two small locomotives, railcars, rails and other material on wagons and sleighs to what is now Truckee, California, and worked the winter of 1867–68 on their way down Truckee canyon ahead of the tracks being completed to Truckee. This feat was dramatized in John Ford's film The Iron Horse with one of Central Pacific's actual locomotives, C.P. Huntington. In Truckee canyon, five Howe truss bridges had to be built. This gave them a head start on getting to the "easy" miles across Nevada.

In order to keep the higher portions of the Sierra grade open in the winter, 37 miles (60 km) of timber snow sheds were built between Blue Cañon and Truckee in addition to utilizing snowplows pushed by locomotives, as well as manual shovelling. With the advent of more efficient oil fired steam and later diesel electric power to drive plows, flangers, spreaders, and rotary snow plows, most of the wooden snowsheds have long since been removed as obsolete. Tunnels 1–5 and Tunnel 13 of the original 1860s tunnels on Track 1 of the Sierra grade remain in use today, while additional new tunnels were later driven when the grade was double tracked over the first quarter of the twentieth century. In 1993, the Southern Pacific Railroad (which operated the CPRR-built Oakland–Ogden line until its 1996 merger with the Union Pacific) closed and pulled up the 6.7-mile (10.8 km) section of Track #1 over the summit running between the Norden complex (Shed 26, MP 192.1) and the covered crossovers in Shed #47 (MP 198.8) about a mile east of the old flyover at Eder, bypassing and abandoning the tunnel 6–8 complex, the concrete snowsheds just beyond them, and tunnels 9–12 ending at MP 195.7, all of which had been located on Track 1 within two miles of the summit. Since then all east- and westbound traffic has been run over the Track #2 grade crossing the summit about one mile (1.6 km) south of Donner Pass through the 10,322-foot-long (3,146 m) Tunnel #41 ("The Big Hole") running under Mt. Judah between Soda Springs and Eder, which was opened in 1925 when the summit section of the grade was double tracked. This routing change was made because the Track 2 and Tunnel 41 Summit crossing is far easier and less expensive to maintain and keep open in the harsh Sierra winters.

On June 18, 1868, the Central Pacific reached Reno, Nevada, after completing 132 miles (212 km) of railroad up and over the Sierras from Sacramento, California. By then the railroad had already been prebuilt down the Truckee River on the much flatter land from Reno to Wadsworth, Nevada, where they bridged the Truckee for the last time. From there, they struggled across a forty mile desert to the end of the Humboldt river at the Humboldt Sink. From the end of the Humboldt, they continued east over the Great Basin Desert bordering the Humboldt River to Wells, Nevada. One of the most troublesome problems found on this route along the Humboldt was at Palisade Canyon (near Carlin, Nevada), where for 12 miles (19 km) the line had to be built between the river and basalt cliffs. From Wells, Nevada, to Promontory Summit, the Railroad left the Humboldt and proceeded across the Nevada and Utah desert. Water for the steam locomotives was provided by wells, springs, or pipelines to nearby water sources. Water was often pumped into the water tanks with windmills. Train fuel and water cranes for the early trains with steam locomotives may have been as often as every 10 miles (16 km). On one memorable occasion, not far from Promontory, the Central Pacific crews organized an army of workers and five train loads of construction material, and laid 10 miles (16 km) of track on a prepared rail bed in one day—a record that still stands today. The Central Pacific and Union Pacific raced to get as much track laid as possible, and the Central Pacific laid about 560 miles (900 km) of track from Reno to Promontory Summit in the one year before the Last Spike was driven on May 10, 1869.

Central Pacific had 1,694 freight cars available by May 1869, with more under construction in their Sacramento yard. Major repairs and maintenance on the Central Pacific rolling stock was done in their Sacramento maintenance yard. Near the end of 1869, Central Pacific had 162 locomotives, of which 2 had two drivers (drive wheels), 110 had four drivers, and 50 had six drivers. The steam locomotives had been purchased in the eastern states and shipped to California by sea. Thirty-six additional locomotives were built and coming west, and twenty-eight more were under construction. There was a shortage of passenger cars and more had to be ordered. The first Central Pacific sleeper, the "Silver Palace Sleeping Car", arrived at Sacramento on June 8, 1868.

The CPRR route passed through Newcastle and Truckee in California, Reno, Wadsworth, Winnemucca, Battle Mountain, Elko and Wells in Nevada (with many more fuel and water stops), before connecting with the Union Pacific line at Promontory Summit in the Utah Territory. When the eastern end of the CPRR was extended to Ogden by purchasing the Union Pacific Railroad line from Promontory for about $2.8 million in 1870, it ended the short period of a boom town for Promontory, extended the Central Pacific tracks about 60 miles (97 km) and made Ogden a major terminus on the transcontinental railroad, as passengers and freight switched railroads there.

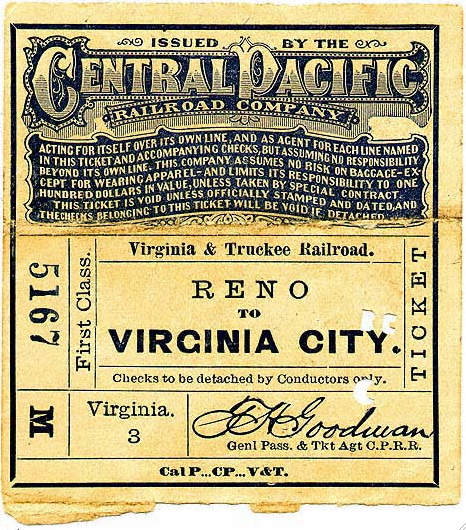
CPRR-issued ticket for passage from Reno to Virginia City, NV on the V&TRR, 1878

Subsequent to the railhead's meeting at Promontory Summit, Utah Territory, the San Joaquin River Bridge at Mossdale Crossing (near present-day Lathrop, California) was completed on September 8, 1869, with the first through freight train carrying freight from the East Coast leaving Sacramento and crossing the bridge to arrive that evening at the Alameda Wharf on San Francisco Bay. As a result, the western part of the route was extended from Sacramento to the Alameda Terminal in Alameda, California, and shortly thereafter, to the Oakland Long Wharf at Oakland Point in Oakland, California, and on to San Jose, California. Train ferries transferred some railroad cars to and from the Oakland wharves and tracks to wharves and tracks in San Francisco. Before the CPRR was completed, developers were building other feeder railroads like the Virginia and Truckee Railroad to the Comstock Lode diggings in Virginia City, Nevada, and several different extensions in California and Nevada to reach other cities there. Some of their main cargo was the thousands of cords (3.6 m^{3} each) of firewood needed for the many steam engines and pumps, cooking stoves, heating stoves etc. in Comstock Lode towns and the tons of ice needed by the miners as they worked ever deeper into the "hot" Comstock Lode ore body. In the mines, temperatures could get above 120 °F (49 °C) at the work face and a miner often used over 100 pounds (45 kg) of ice per shift. This new railroad connected to the Central Pacific near Reno, and went through Carson City, the new capital of Nevada.

After the transcontinental railroads were completed, many other railroads were built to connect up to other population centers in Utah, Wyoming, Kansas, Colorado, Oregon, Washington territories, etc. In 1869, the Kansas Pacific Railway started building the Hannibal Bridge, a swing bridge across the Missouri River between Kansas City, Missouri, and Kansas City, Kansas, which connected railroads on both sides of the Missouri while still allowing passage of paddle steamers on the river. After completion, this became another major east–west railroad. To speed completion of the Kansas Pacific Railroad to Denver, construction started east from Denver in March 1870 to meet the railroad coming west from Kansas city. The two crews met at a point called Comanche Crossing, Kansas, on August 15, 1870. Denver was now firmly on track to becoming the largest city and the future capital of Colorado. The Kansas Pacific Railroad linked with the Denver Pacific Railway via Denver to Cheyenne in 1870.

The original transcontinental railroad route did not pass through the two biggest cities in the so-called Great American Desert—Denver, Colorado, and Salt Lake City, Utah. Feeder railroad lines were soon built to service these two and other cities and states along the route.

Modern-day Interstate 80 roughly follows the path of the railroad from Sacramento across modern day California, Nevada, Wyoming and Nebraska, with a few exceptions. Most significantly, the two routes are different between Wells, Nevada, and Echo, Utah. In this area the freeway passes along the south shore of the Great Salt Lake and passes through Salt Lake City, cresting the Wasatch Mountains at Parley's Summit. The railroad was originally routed along the north shore, and later with the Lucin Cutoff directly across the center of the Great Salt Lake, passing through the city of Ogden instead of Salt Lake City. The railroad crosses the Wasatch Mountains via a much gentler grade through Weber Canyon. Most of the other deviations are in mountainous areas where interstate highways allow for grades up to six-percent grades, which allows them to go many places the railroads had to go around, since their goal was to hold their grades to less than two percent.

== Construction ==
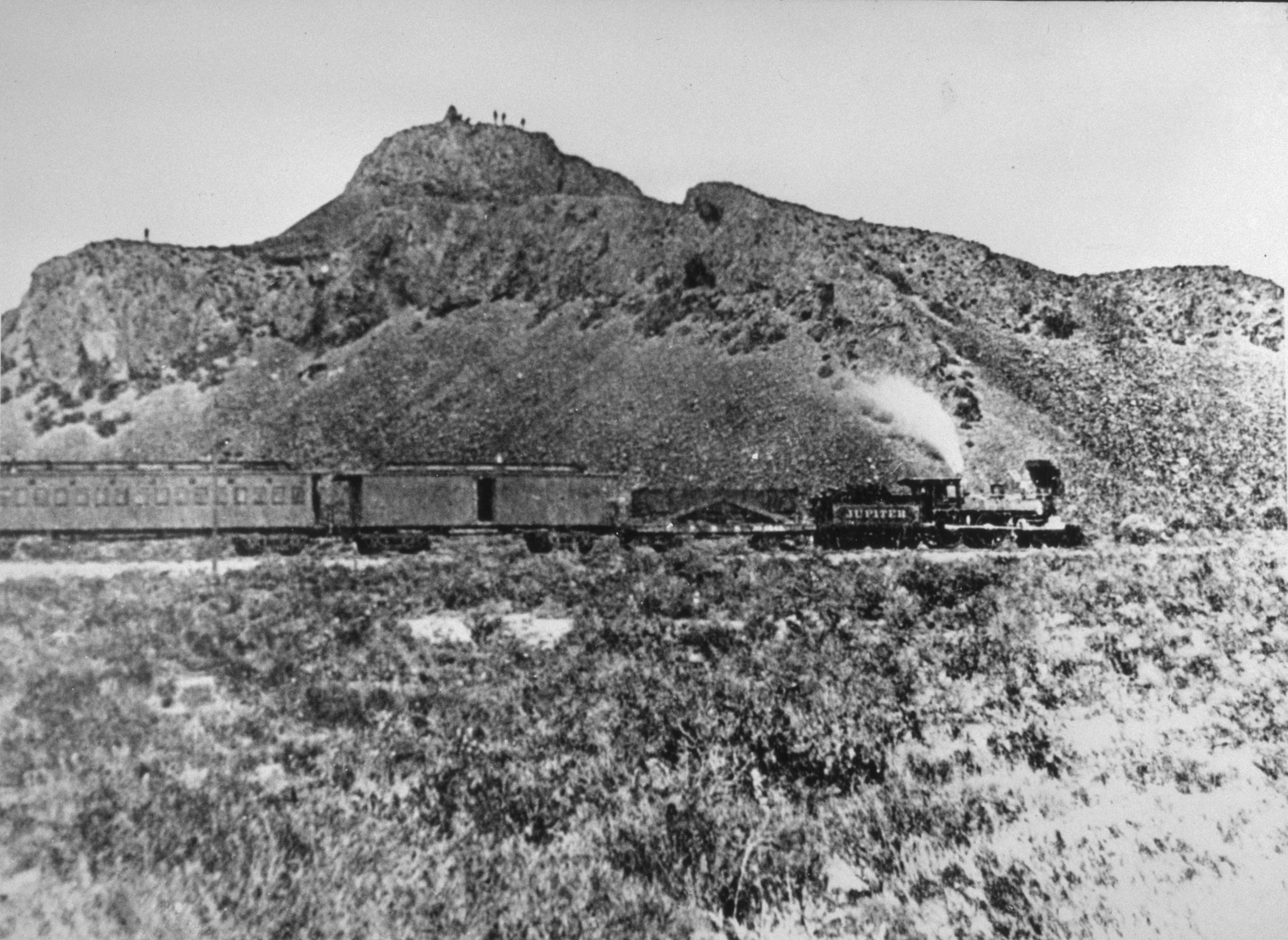
The Jupiter, which carried Leland Stanford (one of the "Big Four" owners of the Central Pacific) and other railway officials to the Last Spike Ceremony

Most of the capital investment needed to build the railroad was generated by selling government-guaranteed bonds (granted per mile of completed track) to interested investors. The Federal donation of right-of-way saved money and time as it did not have to be purchased from others. The financial incentives and bonds would hopefully cover most of the initial capital investment needed to build the railroad. The bonds would be paid back by the sale of government-granted land, as well as prospective passenger and freight income. Most of the engineers and surveyors who figured out how and where to build the railroad on the Union Pacific were engineering college trained. Many of Union Pacific engineers and surveyors were Union Army veterans (including two generals) who had learned their railroad trade keeping the trains running and tracks maintained during the U.S. Civil War. After securing the finances and selecting the engineering team, the next step was to hire the key personnel and prospective supervisors. Nearly all key workers and supervisors were hired because they had previous railroad on-the-job training, knew what needed to be done and how to direct workers to get it done. After the key personnel were hired, the semi-skilled jobs could be filled if there was available labor. The engineering team's main job was to tell the workers where to go, what to do, how to do it, and provide the construction material they would need to get it done.

Survey teams were put out to produce detailed contour maps of the options on the different routes. The engineering team looked at the available surveys and chose what was the "best" route. Survey teams under the direction of the engineers closely led the work crews and marked where and by how much hills would have to be cut and depressions filled or bridged. Coordinators made sure that construction and other supplies were provided when and where needed, and additional supplies were ordered as the railroad construction consumed the supplies. Specialized bridging, explosive and tunneling teams were assigned to their specialized jobs. Some jobs like explosive work, tunneling, bridging, heavy cuts or fills were known to take longer than others, so the specialized teams were sent out ahead by wagon trains with the supplies and men to get these jobs done by the time the regular track-laying crews arrived. Finance officers made sure the supplies were paid for and men paid for their work. An army of men had to be coordinated and a seemingly never-ending chain of supplies had to be provided. The Central Pacific road crew set a track-laying record by laying 10 mi (16 km) of track in a single day, commemorating the event with a signpost beside the track for passing trains to see.

In addition to the track-laying crews, other crews were busy setting up stations with provisions for loading fuel, water and often also mail, passengers and freight. Personnel had to be hired to run these stations. Maintenance depots had to be built to keep all of the equipment repaired and operational. Telegraph operators had to be hired to man each station to keep track of where the trains were so that trains could run in each direction on the available single track without interference or accidents. Passing sidings (also known as passing loops) had to be built to allow trains to pass. Provision had to be made to store and continually pay for coal or wood needed to run the steam locomotives. Water towers had to be built for refilling the water tanks on the engines, and provision made to keep them full.

=== Labor ===
The majority of the Union Pacific track across the Nebraska and Wyoming territories was built by veterans of the Union and Confederate armies, as well as many recent immigrants. Brigham Young, President of the Church of Jesus Christ of Latter-day Saints, landed contracts with the Union Pacific that offered jobs for around 2,000 members of the church with the hope that the railroad would support commerce in Utah. Church members built most of the road through Utah. Construction superintendent Durant repeatedly failed to pay the wages agreed upon. The Union Pacific train carrying him to the final spike ceremony was held up by a strike by unpaid workers in Piedmont, Wyoming, until he paid them for their work. Representatives of Brigham Young had less success, and failed in court to force him to honor the contract.

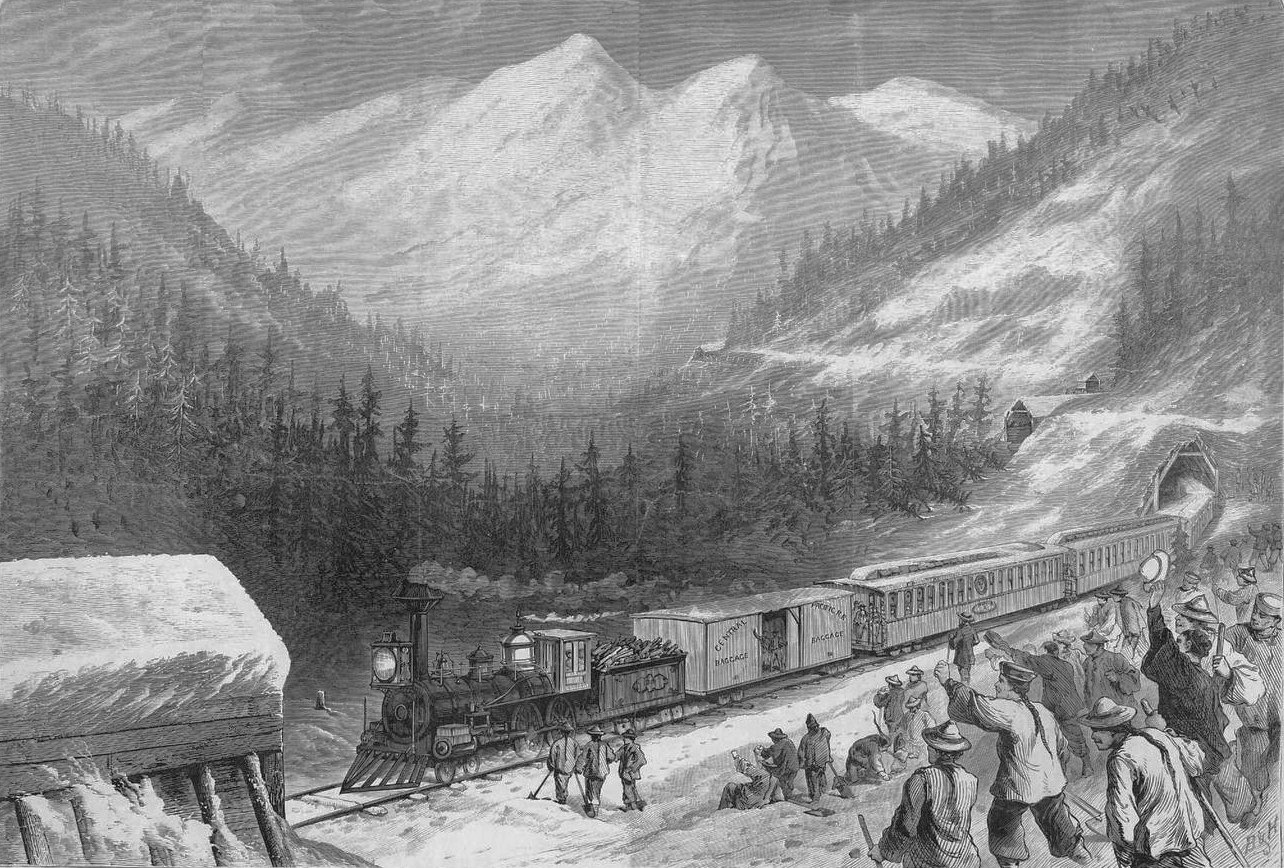
Chinese railroad workers greet a train on a snowy day.

The manual labor to build the Central Pacific's roadbed, bridges and tunnels was done primarily by many thousands of emigrant workers from China under the direction of skilled non-Chinese supervisors. The Chinese were commonly referred to at the time as "Celestials" and China as the "Celestial Kingdom". Labor-saving devices in those days consisted primarily of wheelbarrows, horse or mule pulled carts, and a few railroad pulled gondolas. The construction work involved an immense amount of manual labor. Initially, Central Pacific had a hard time hiring and keeping unskilled workers on its line, as many would leave for the prospect of far more lucrative gold or silver mining options elsewhere. Despite the concerns expressed by Charles Crocker, one of the "big four" and a general contractor, that the Chinese were too small in stature and lacking previous experience with railroad work, they decided to try them anyway. After the first few days of trial with a few workers, with noticeably positive results, Crocker decided to hire as many as he could, looking primarily at the California labor force, where the majority of Chinese worked as independent gold miners or in the service industries (e.g.: laundries and kitchens). Most of these Chinese workers were represented by a Chinese "boss" who translated, collected salaries for his crew, kept discipline and relayed orders from an American general supervisor. Most Chinese workers spoke only rudimentary or no English, and the supervisors typically only learned rudimentary Chinese. Many more workers were imported from the Guangdong Province of China, which at the time, beside great poverty, suffered from the violence of the Taiping Rebellion. Most Chinese workers were planning on returning with their newfound "wealth" when the work was completed. Most of the men received between one and three dollars per day, the same as unskilled white workers; but the workers imported directly from China sometimes received less. A diligent worker could save over $20 per month after paying for food and lodging—a "fortune" by Chinese standards. A snapshot of workers in late 1865 showed about 3,000 Chinese and 1,700 white workers employed on the railroad. Nearly all of the white workers were in supervisory or skilled craft positions and made more money than the Chinese.

Most of the early work on the Central Pacific consisted of constructing the railroad track bed, cutting and/or blasting through or around hills, filling in washes, building bridges or trestles, digging and blasting tunnels and then laying the rails over the Sierra Nevada mountains. Once the Central Pacific was out of the Sierras and the Carson Range, progress sped up considerably as the railroad bed could be built over nearly flat ground. In those days, the Central Pacific once did a section of 10 miles (16 km) of track in one day as a "demonstration" of what they could do on flat ground like most of the Union Pacific had in Wyoming and Nebraska.

The track laying was divided up into various parts. In advance of the track layers, surveyors consulting with engineers determined where the track would go. Workers then built and prepared the roadbed, dug or blasted through hills, filled in washes, built trestles, bridges or culverts across streams or valleys, made tunnels if needed, and laid the ties. The actual track-laying gang would then lay rails on the previously laid ties positioned on the roadbed, drive the spikes, and bolt the fishplate bars to each rail. At the same time, another gang would distribute telegraph poles and wire along the grade, while the cooks prepared dinner and the clerks busied themselves with accounts, records, using the telegraph line to relay requests for more materials and supplies or communicate with supervisors. Usually the workers lived in camps built near their work site. Supplies were ordered by the engineers and hauled by rail, possibly then to be loaded on wagons if they were needed ahead of the railhead. Camps were moved when the railhead moved a significant distance. Later, as the railroad started moving long distances every few days, some railroad cars had bunkhouses built in them that moved with the workers—the Union Pacific had used this technique since 1866. Almost all of the roadbed work had to be done manually, using shovels, picks, axes, two-wheeled dump carts, wheelbarrows, ropes, scrapers, etc., with initially only black powder available for blasting. Carts pulled by mules, and horses were about the only labor-saving devices available then. Lumber and ties were usually provided by independent contractors who cut, hauled and sawed the timber as required.

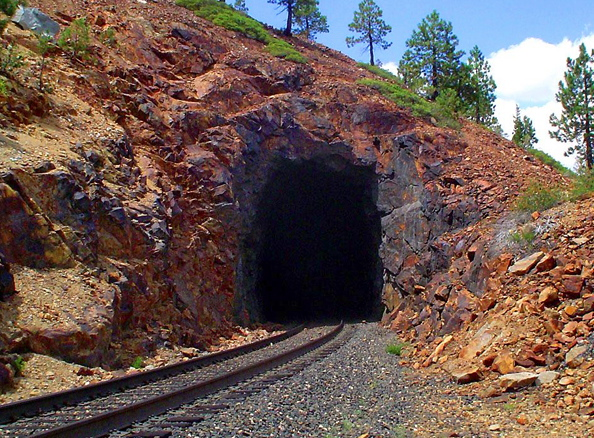
CPRR Tunnel#3 near Cisco, California (MP 180.1) opened in 1866 and remains in daily use today.

Tunnels were blasted through hard rock by drilling holes in the rock face by hand and filling them with black powder. Sometimes cracks were found which could be filled with powder and blasted loose. The loosened rock would be collected and hauled out of the tunnel for use in a fill area or as roadbed, or else dumped over the side as waste. A foot or so advance on a tunnel face was a typical day's work. Some tunnels took almost a year to finish and the Summit Tunnel, the longest, took almost two years. In the final days of working in the Sierras, the recently invented nitroglycerin explosive was introduced and used on the last tunnels including Summit Tunnel.

Supply trains carried all the necessary material for the construction up to the railhead, with mule or horse-drawn wagons carrying it the rest of the ways if required. Ties were typically unloaded from horse-drawn or mule-drawn wagons and then placed on the track ballast and leveled to get ready for the rails. Rails, which weighed the most, were often kicked off the flatcars and carried by gangs of men on each side of the rail to where needed. The rails just in front of the rail car would be placed first, measured for the correct gauge with gauge sticks and then nailed down on the ties with spike mauls. The fishplates connecting the ends of the rails would be bolted on and then the car pushed by hand to the end of the rail and rail installation repeated.

Track ballast was put between the ties as they progressed. Where a proper railbed had already been prepared, the work progressed rapidly. Constantly needed supplies included "food, water, ties, rails, spikes, fishplates, nuts and bolts, track ballast, telegraph poles, wire, firewood (or coal on the Union Pacific) and water for the steam train locomotives, etc." After a flatcar was unloaded, it would usually be hooked to a small locomotive and pulled back to a siding, so another flatcar with rails etc. could be advanced to the railhead. Since juggling railroad cars took time on flat ground, where wagon transport was easier, the rail cars would be brought to the end of the line by steam locomotive, unloaded, and the flat car returned immediately to a siding for another loaded car of either ballast or rails. Temporary sidings were often installed where it could be easily done to expedite getting needed supplies to the railhead.

The railroad tracks, spikes, telegraph wire, locomotives, railroad cars, supplies etc. were imported from the east on sailing ships that sailed the nearly 18,000-mile (29,000 km), 200-day trip around Cape Horn. Some freight was put on Clipper ships which could do the trip in about 120 days. Some passengers and high-priority freight were shipped over the newly completed (as of 1855) Panama Railroad across the Isthmus of Panama. Using paddle steamers to and from Panama, this shortcut could be traveled in as little as 40 days. Supplies were normally offloaded at the Sacramento, California, docks where the railroad started.

=== Central Pacific construction ===
On January 8, 1863, Governor Leland Stanford ceremonially broke ground in Sacramento, California, to begin construction of the Central Pacific Railroad. After great initial progress along the Sacramento Valley, construction was slowed, first by the foothills of the Sierra Nevada, then by cutting a railroad bed up the mountains themselves. As they progressed higher in the mountains, winter snowstorms and a shortage of reliable labor compounded the problems. On January 7, 1865, a want ad for 5,000 laborers was placed in the Sacramento Union. Consequently, after a trial crew of Chinese workers was hired and found to work successfully, the Central Pacific expanded its efforts to hire more emigrant laborers—mostly Chinese. Emigrants from poverty stricken regions of China, many of which suffered from the strife of the Taiping Rebellion, seemed to be more willing to tolerate the living and working conditions on the railroad construction, and progress on the railroad continued. The increasing necessity for tunneling as they proceeded up the mountains then began to slow progress of the line yet again.

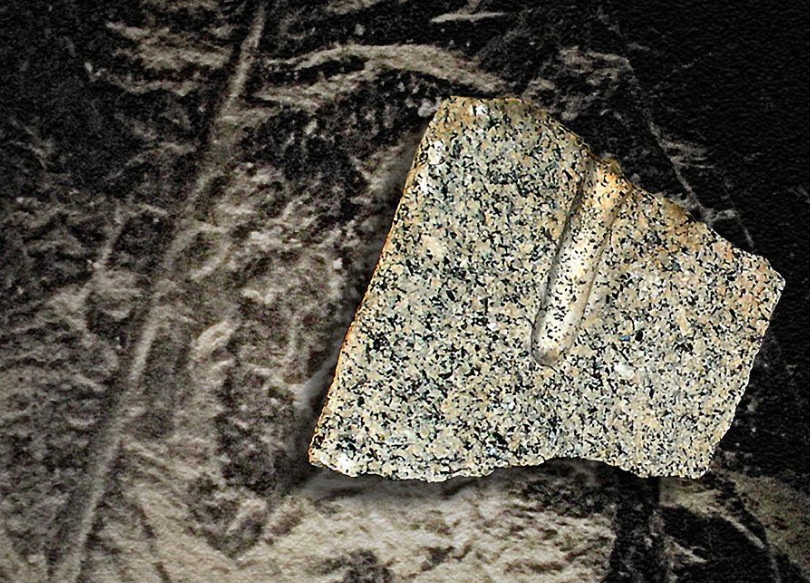
Example of hand-drilled granite from within Tunnel#6, the "Summit Tunnel"

The first step of construction was to survey the route and determine the locations where large excavations, tunnels and bridges would be needed. Crews could then start work in advance of the railroad reaching these locations. Supplies and workers were brought up to the work locations by wagon teams and work on several different sections proceeded simultaneously. One advantage of working on tunnels in winter was that tunnel work could often proceed since the work was nearly all "inside". Living quarters would have to be built outside and getting new supplies was difficult. Working and living in winter in the presence of snow slides and avalanches caused some deaths.

To carve a tunnel, one worker held a rock drill on the granite face while one to two other workers swung eighteen-pound sledgehammers to sequentially hit the drill which slowly advanced into the rock. Once the hole was about 10 inches (25 cm) deep, it would be filled with black powder, a fuse set and then ignited from a safe distance. Nitroglycerin, which had been invented less than two decades before the construction of the first transcontinental railroad, was used in relatively large quantities during its construction. This was especially true on the Central Pacific Railroad, which owned its own nitroglycerin plant to ensure it had a steady supply of the volatile explosive. This plant was operated by Chinese laborers as they were willing workers even under the most trying and dangerous of conditions.

Chinese laborers were also crucial in the construction of 15 tunnels along the railroad's line through the Sierra Nevada mountains. These were about 32 feet (9.8 m) high and 16 feet (4.9 m) wide. When tunnels with vertical shafts were dug to increase construction speed, tunneling began in the middle of the tunnel and at both ends simultaneously. At first hand-powered derricks were used to help remove loose rocks up the vertical shafts. These derricks were later replaced with steam hoists as work progressed. By using vertical shafts, four faces of the tunnel could be worked at the same time, two in the middle and one at each end. The average daily progress in some tunnels was only 0.85 feet (26 cm) a day per face, which was very slow, or 1.18 feet (36 cm) daily according to historian George Kraus. J. O. Wilder, a Central Pacific-Southern Pacific employee, commented that "The Chinese were as steady, hard-working a set of men as could be found. With the exception of a few whites at the west end of Tunnel No. 6, the laboring force was entirely composed of Chinamen with white foremen and a "boss/translator". A single foreman (often Irish) with a gang of 30 to 40 Chinese men generally constituted the force at work at each end of a tunnel; of these, 12 to 15 men worked on the heading, and the rest on the bottom, removing blasted material. When a gang was small or the men were needed elsewhere, the bottoms were worked with fewer men or stopped so as to keep the headings going." The laborers usually worked three shifts of 8 hours each per day, while the foremen worked in two shifts of 12 hours each, managing the laborers. Once out of the Sierra, construction was much easier and faster. Under the direction of construction superintendent James Harvey Strobridge, Central Pacific track-laying crews set a record with 10 miles 56 feet (16.111 km) of track laid in one day on April 28, 1869. Horace Hamilton Minkler, track foreman for the Central Pacific, laid the last rail and tie before the Last Spike was driven.

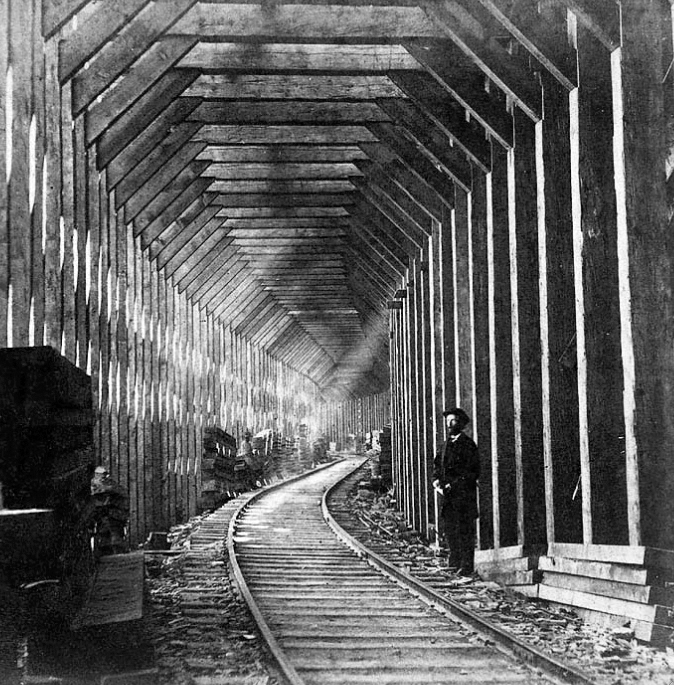
CPRR snow galleries allowed construction to continue in heavy snow (1868).

In order to keep the CPRR's Sierra grade open during the winter months, beginning in 1867, 37 miles (60 km) of massive wooden snow sheds and galleries were built between Blue Cañon and Truckee, covering cuts and other points where there was danger of avalanches. 2,500 men and six material trains were employed in this work, which was completed in 1869. The sheds were built with two sides and a steep peaked roof, mostly of locally cut hewn timber and round logs. Snow galleries had one side and a roof that sloped upward until it met the mountainside, thus permitting avalanches to slide over the galleries, some of which extended up the mountainside as much as 200 feet (61 m). Masonry walls such as the "Chinese Walls" at Donner Summit were built across canyons to prevent avalanches from striking the side of the vulnerable wooden construction. A few concrete sheds (mostly at crossovers) are still in use today.

=== Union Pacific construction ===
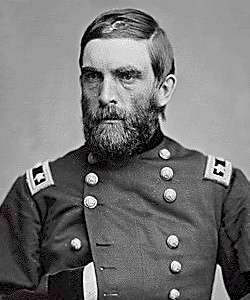
Grenville M. Dodge wearing a major general's uniform

The major investor in the Union Pacific was Thomas Clark Durant, who had made his stake money by smuggling Confederate cotton with the aid of Grenville M. Dodge. Durant chose routes that would favor places where he held land, and he announced connections to other lines at times that suited his share dealings. He paid an associate to submit the construction bid to another company he controlled, Crédit Mobilier, manipulating the finances and government subsidies and making himself another fortune. Durant hired Dodge as chief engineer and Jack Casement as construction boss.

In the East, the progress started in Omaha, Nebraska, by the Union Pacific Railroad which initially proceeded very quickly because of the open terrain of the Great Plains. This changed as the work entered Indian-held lands, because the railroad violated Native American treaties with the United States. War parties began to raid the moving labor camps that followed the progress of the line. Union Pacific responded by increasing security and hiring marksmen to kill American Bison, which were both a physical threat to trains and the primary food source for many of the Plains Indians. The Native Americans then began killing laborers when they realized that the so-called "Iron Horse" threatened their existence. Security measures were further strengthened, and progress on the railroad continued.

Gen. William Tecumseh Sherman's first postwar command (Military Division of the Mississippi) covered the territory west of the Mississippi and east of the Rocky Mountains, and his top priority was to protect the construction of the railroads. In 1867, he wrote to Gen. Ulysses S. Grant, "we are not going to let thieving, ragged Indians check and stop the progress" of the railroads.

"On the ground in the West, Gen. Philip Henry Sheridan, assuming Sherman's command, took to his task much as he had done in the Shenandoah Valley during the Civil War, when he ordered the "scorched earth" tactics that presaged Sherman's March to the Sea."

"The devastation of the buffalo population signalled the end of the Indian Wars, and Native Americans were pushed into reservations. In 1869, the Comanche chief Tosawi was reported to have told Sheridan, "Me Tosawi. Me good Indian," and Sheridan allegedly replied, "The only good Indians I ever saw were dead." The phrase was later misquoted, with Sheridan supposedly stating, "The only good Indian is a dead Indian." Sheridan denied he had ever said such a thing."

"By the end of the 19th century, only 300 buffalo were left in the wild. Congress finally took action, outlawing the killing of any birds or animals in Yellowstone National Park, where the only surviving buffalo herd could be protected. Conservationists established more wildlife preserves, and the species slowly rebounded. Today, there are more than 200,000 bison in North America."

"Sheridan acknowledged the role of the railroad in changing the face of the American West, and in his Annual Report of the General of the U.S. Army in 1878, he acknowledged that the Native Americans were scuttled to reservations with no compensation beyond the promise of religious instruction and basic supplies of food and clothing—promises, he wrote, which were never fulfilled."

"We took away their country and their means of support, broke up their mode of living, their habits of life, introduced disease and decay among them, and it was for this and against this they made war. Could any one expect less? Then, why wonder at Indian difficulties?"

=== The "Last Spike" ceremony ===
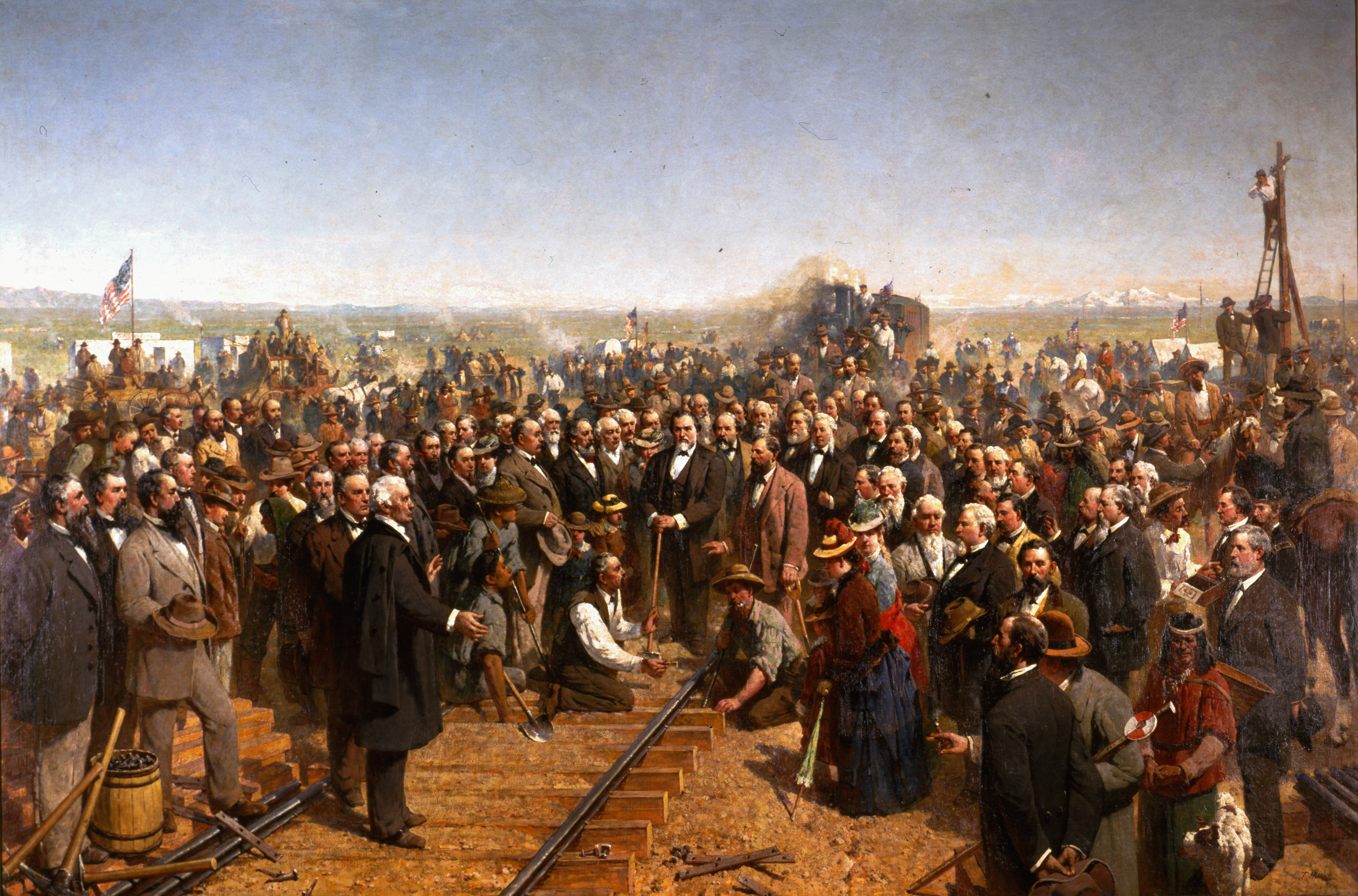
The Last Spike by Thomas Hill (1881) is on display at the California State Railroad Museum in Sacramento, California.

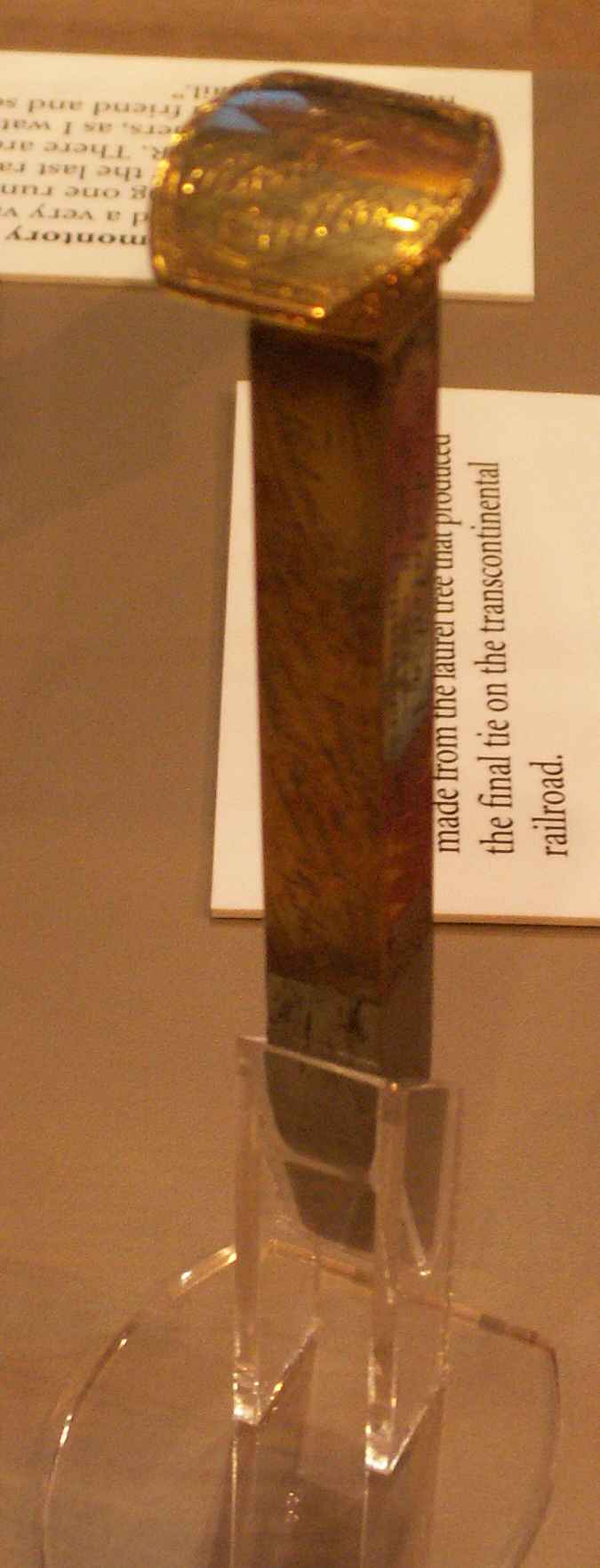
Golden spike, one of four ceremonial spikes driven at the completion

Six years after the groundbreaking, laborers of the Central Pacific Railroad from the west and the Union Pacific Railroad from the east met at Promontory Summit, Utah Territory. On the Union Pacific side was Union Pacific No 119, an 1868 4-4-0 type. Thrusting westward, the last two rails were laid by Irishmen. On the Central Pacific side was their Central Pacific No 60 Jupiter, another 1868 4-4-0 type. Thrusting eastward, the last two rails were laid by the Chinese.

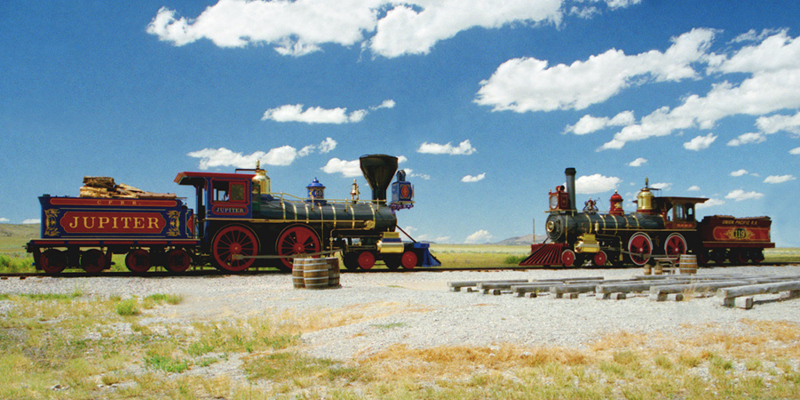
Operating steam engines are in the Golden Spike National Historic Park at Promontory Summit, Utah.

It was at Promontory Summit on May 10, 1869, that the two engines met. Leland Stanford drove The Last Spike (or golden spike) that joined the rails of the transcontinental railroad. The spike is now on display at the Cantor Arts Center at Stanford University, while a second "Last" Golden Spike is also on display at the California State Railroad Museum in Sacramento. In perhaps the world's first live mass-media event, the hammers and spike were wired to the telegraph line so that each hammer stroke would be heard as a click at telegraph stations nationwide—the hammer strokes were missed, so the clicks were sent by the telegraph operator. As soon as the ceremonial "Last Spike" had been replaced by an ordinary iron spike, a message was transmitted to both the East Coast and West Coast that simply read, "DONE". Travel from coast to coast was reduced from six months or more to just one week.

== Aftermath ==
=== Railroad developments ===
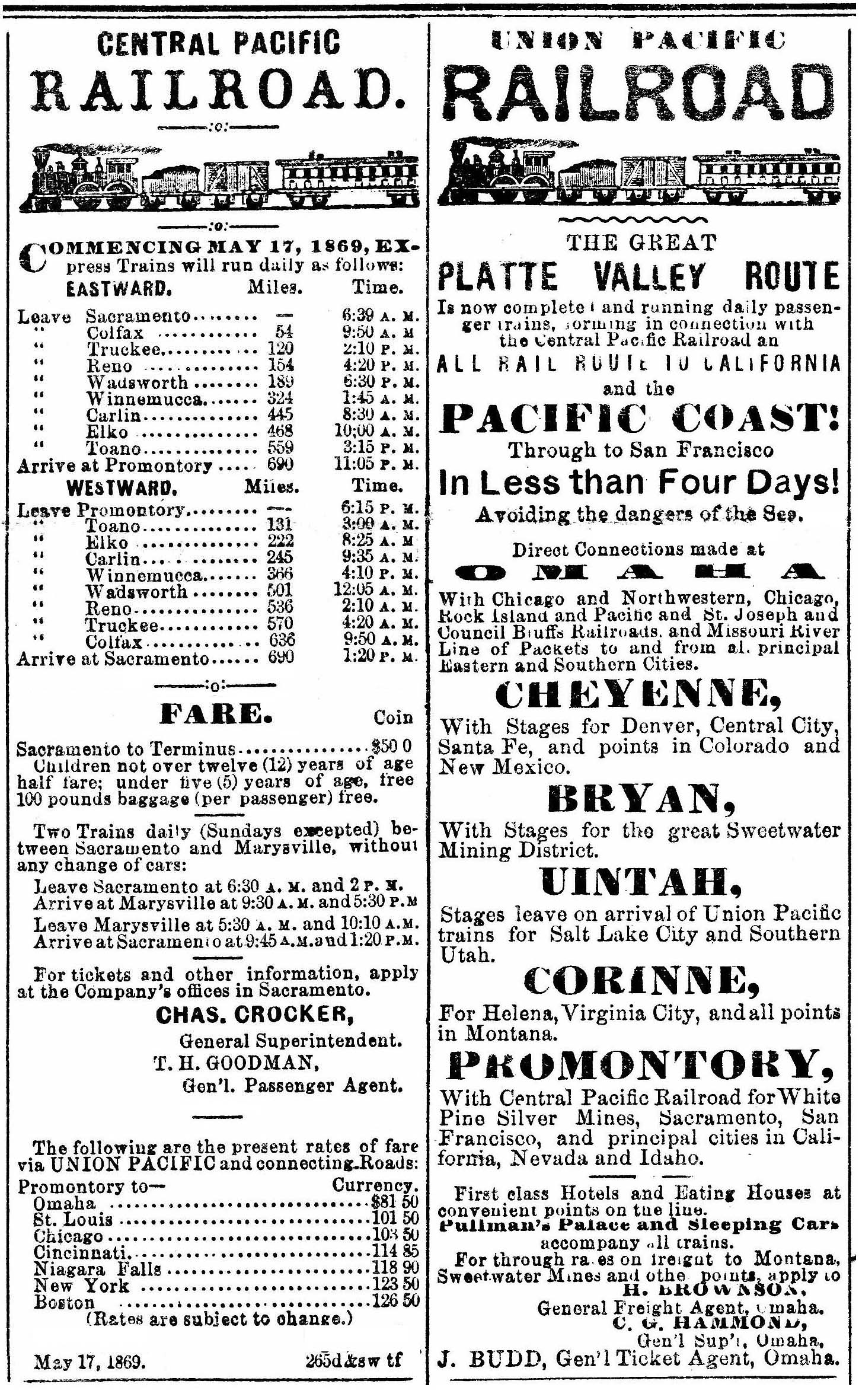
Display ads for the CPRR and UPRR the week the rails were joined on May 10, 1869

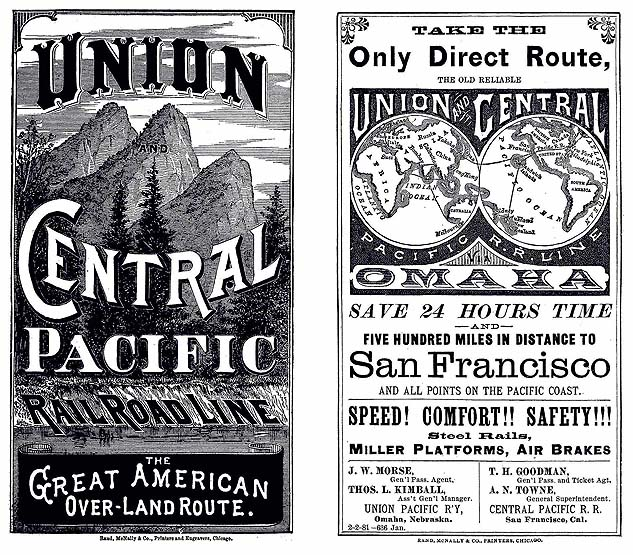
UPRR & CPRR "Great American Over-Land Route" Timetable cover 1881

When the golden spike was driven, the rail network was not yet connected to the Atlantic or Pacific but merely connected Omaha, Nebraska to Sacramento, California. To get from Sacramento to the Pacific, the Central Pacific purchased in 1867 the struggling Western Pacific Railroad (unrelated to the railroad of the same name that would later parallel its route) and in February 1868 resumed construction on it, which had halted in October 1866 because of funding troubles. Upon completing the last link at the Mossdale crossing of the San Joaquin River on September 6, 1869, the first transcontinental rail passengers arrived at the Pacific Railroad's original western terminus on the east side of San Francisco Bay at the Alameda Terminal, where they transferred to the steamer Alameda for transport across the Bay to San Francisco. On November 8, 1869, the Central Pacific finally completed the rail connection to its western terminus at Oakland, California, also on the East Bay, where freight and passengers completed their transcontinental link to San Francisco by ferry.

The original route from the Central Valley to the Bay skirted the Delta by heading south out of Sacramento through Stockton and crossing the San Joaquin River at Mossdale, then climbed over the Altamont Pass and reached the east side of the San Francisco Bay through Niles Canyon. The Western Pacific was originally chartered to go to San Jose, but the Central Pacific decided to build along the East Bay instead, as going from San Jose up the Peninsula to San Francisco itself would have brought it into conflict with competing interests. The railroad entered Alameda and Oakland from the south, roughly paralleling what would later become U.S. Route 50 and later still Interstates 5, 205, and 580. A more direct route was obtained with the purchase of the California Pacific Railroad, crossing the Sacramento River and proceeding southwest through Davis to Benicia, where it crossed the Carquinez Strait by means of the enormous Solano train ferry, then followed the shores of the San Pablo and San Francisco bays to Richmond and the Port of Oakland (paralleling U.S. Route 40 which ultimately became Interstate 80). In 1930, a rail bridge across the Carquinez replaced the Benicia ferries.

Very early on, the Central Pacific learned that it would have trouble maintaining an open track in winter across the Sierras. At first they tried plowing the road with special snowplows mounted on their steam engines. When this was only partially successful, an extensive process of building snow sheds over some of the track was instituted to protect it from deep snows and avalanches. These eventually succeeded at keeping the tracks clear for all but a few days of the year.

Both railroads soon instituted extensive upgrade projects to build better bridges, viaducts and dugways as well as install heavier duty rails, stronger ties, better road beds etc. The original track had often been laid as fast as possible with only secondary attention to maintenance and durability. The primary incentive had been getting the subsidies, which meant that upgrades of all kinds were routinely required in the following years. The cost of making these upgrades was relatively small once the railroad was operating. Once the railroad was complete, supplies could be moved from distant factories directly to the construction site by rail.

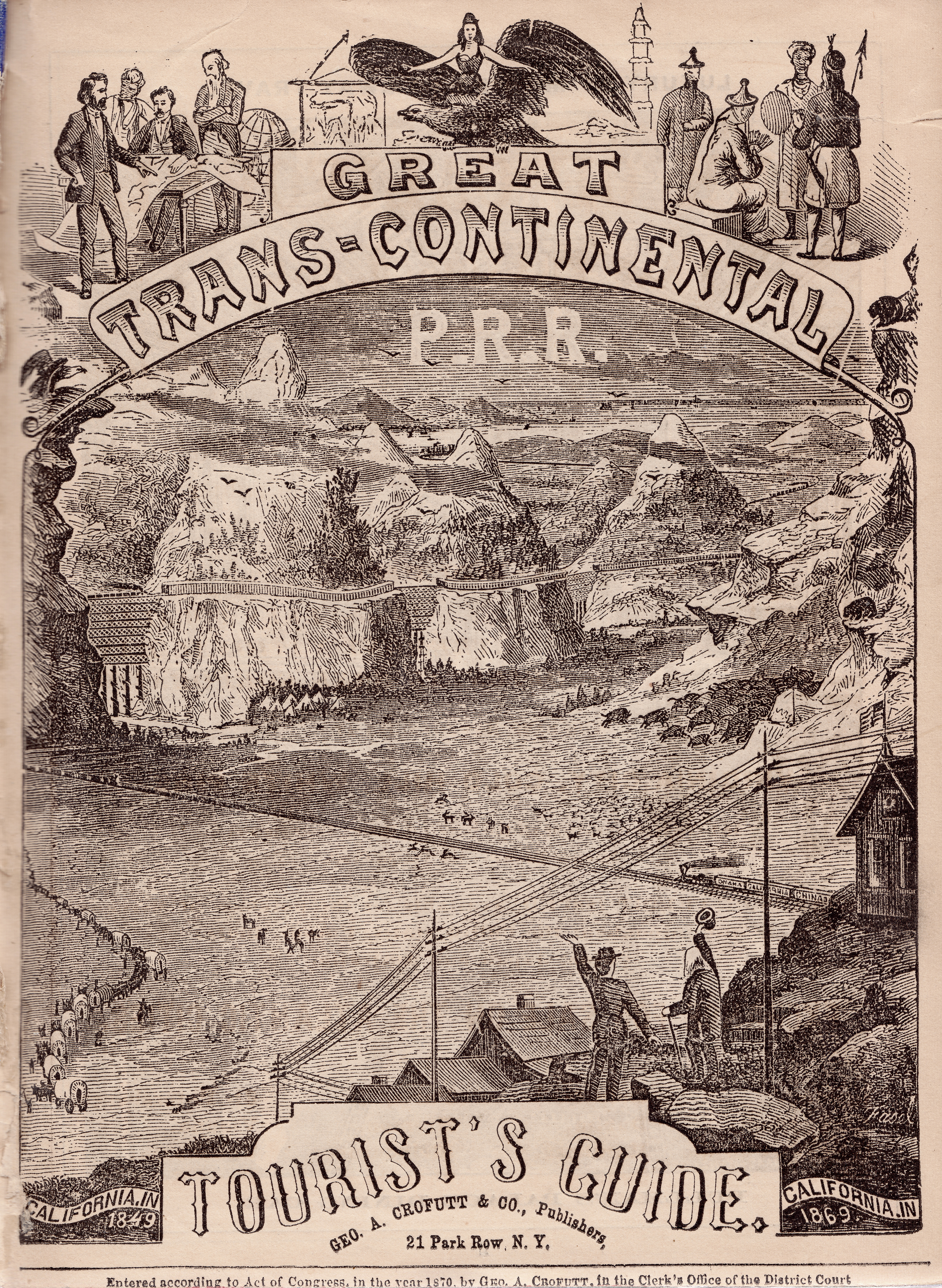
Frontispiece of Crofutt's Great Trans-Continental Tourist's Guide, 1870

The Union Pacific would not connect Omaha to Council Bluffs until completing the Union Pacific Missouri River Bridge in 1872.

Several years after the end of the Civil War, the competing railroads coming from Missouri finally realized their initial strategic advantage and a building boom ensued. In July 1869, the Hannibal and St. Joseph Railroad finished the Hannibal Bridge in Kansas City which was the first bridge to cross the Missouri River. This in turn connected to Kansas Pacific trains going from Kansas City to Denver, which in turn had built the Denver Pacific Railway connecting to the Union Pacific. In August 1870, the Kansas Pacific drove the last spike connecting to the Denver Pacific line at Strasburg, Colorado, and the first true Atlantic to Pacific United States railroad was completed.

Kansas City's head start in connecting to a true transcontinental railroad contributed to it rather than Omaha becoming the dominant rail center west of Chicago.

The Kansas Pacific became part of the Union Pacific in 1880.

On June 4, 1876, an express train called the Transcontinental Express arrived in San Francisco via the first transcontinental railroad only 83 hours and 39 minutes after it had left New York City. Only ten years before, the same journey would have taken months over land or weeks on ship, possibly all the way around South America.

The Central Pacific got a direct route to San Francisco when it was merged with the Southern Pacific Railroad to create the Southern Pacific Company in 1885. The Union Pacific initially took over the Southern Pacific in 1901 but was forced by the U.S. Supreme Court to divest it because of monopoly concerns. The two railroads would once again unite in 1996 when the Southern Pacific was sold to the Union Pacific.

Several segments of the line in Nevada were realigned between 1901 and 1903 to reduce grades and curve radii. Having been bypassed with the completion of the Lucin Cutoff in 1904, the Promontory Summit rails were pulled up in 1942 to be recycled for the World War II effort. This process began with a ceremonial "undriving" at the Last Spike location.

=== Crédit Mobilier ===
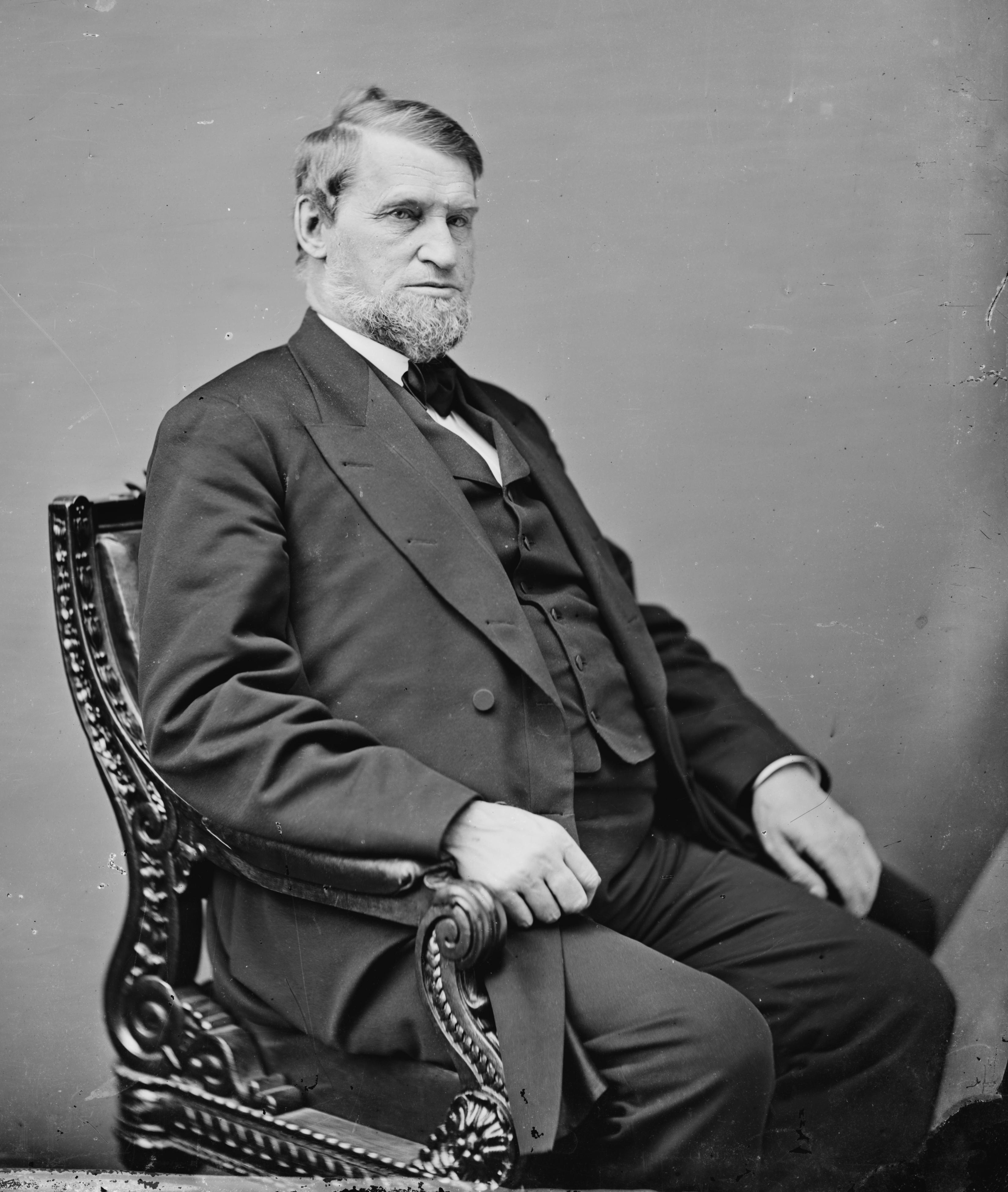
Oakes Ames

Despite the transcontinental success and millions in government subsidies, the Union Pacific faced bankruptcy less than three years after the Last Spike as details surfaced about overcharges that Crédit Mobilier had billed Union Pacific for the formal building of the railroad. The scandal hit epic proportions in the 1872 United States presidential election, which saw the re-election of Ulysses S. Grant and became the biggest scandal of the Gilded Age. It would not be resolved until the death of the congressman who was supposed to have reined in its excesses but instead wound up profiting from it.

Durant had initially come up with the scheme to have Crédit Mobilier subcontract to do the actual track work. Durant gained control of the company after buying out employee Herbert Hoxie for $10,000. Under Durant's guidance, Crédit Mobilier was charging Union Pacific often twice or more the customary cost for track work. The process mired down Union Pacific work.

Lincoln asked Massachusetts Congressman Oakes Ames, who was on the railroad committee, to clean things up and get the railroad moving. Ames got his brother Oliver Ames Jr. named president of the Union Pacific, while he became president of Crédit Mobilier.

Ames then in turn gave stock options to other politicians while at the same time continuing the lucrative overcharges. The scandal was to implicate Vice President Schuyler Colfax (who was cleared) and future President James Garfield among others.

The scandal broke in 1872 when the New York Sun published correspondence detailing the scheme between Henry S. McComb and Ames. In the ensuing Congressional investigation, it was recommended that Ames be expelled from Congress, but this was reduced to a censure and Ames died within three months.

Durant later left the Union Pacific and a new rail baron, Jay Gould, became the dominant stockholder. As a result of the Panic of 1873, Gould was able to pick up bargains, among them the control of the Union Pacific Railroad and Western Union.

=== Visible remains ===
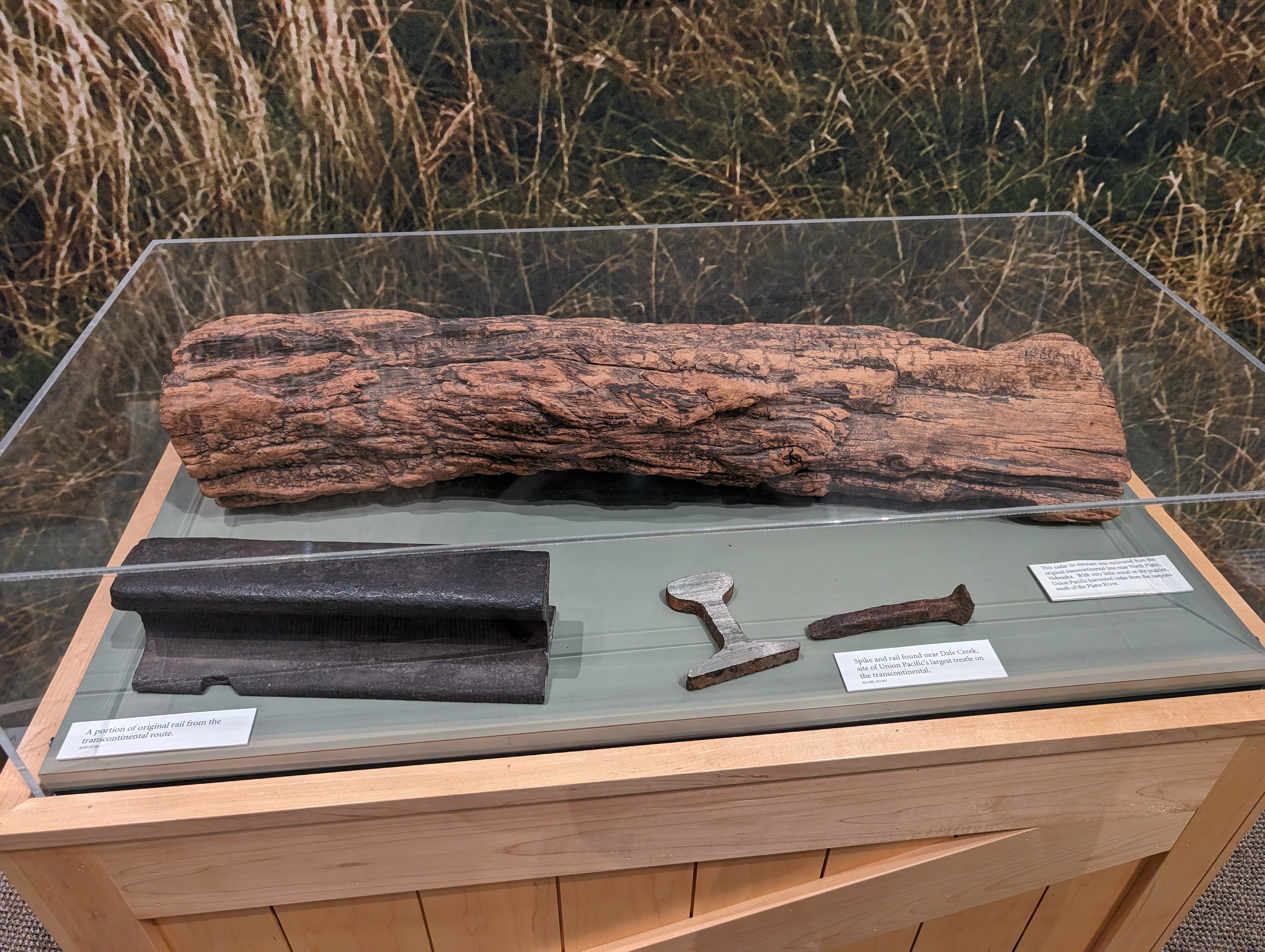
Artifacts of the Transcontinental Railroad at the Union Pacific Railroad Museum in Council Bluffs, Iowa. Includes an original piece of rail, spike, and cedar tie.

Visible remains of the historic line are still easily located—hundreds of miles are still in service today, especially through the Sierra Nevada Mountains and canyons in Utah and Wyoming. While the original rail has long since been replaced because of age and wear, and the roadbed upgraded and repaired, the lines generally run on top of the original, handmade grade. Vista points on Interstate 80 through California's Truckee Canyon provide a panoramic view of many miles of the original Central Pacific line and of the snow sheds which made winter train travel safe and practical.

In areas where the original line has been bypassed and abandoned, primarily because of the Lucin Cutoff re-route in Utah, the original road grade is still obvious, as are numerous cuts and fills, especially the Big Fill a few miles east of Promontory. The sweeping curve which connected to the east end of the Big Fill now passes a Thiokol rocket research and development facility.

In 1957, Congress authorized the Golden Spike National Historic Site, which was redesignated the Golden Spike National Historical Park in 2019. Today the site features replica engines of Union Pacific No. 119 and Central Pacific Jupiter. The engines are fired up periodically by the National Park Service for the public. On May 10, 2006, on the anniversary of the driving of the spike, Utah announced that its state quarter design would be a representation of the driving of the Last Spike.

=== Current passenger service ===
Amtrak's California Zephyr, a daily passenger service from Emeryville, California (in the San Francisco Bay Area) to Chicago, uses the first transcontinental railroad from Sacramento to central Nevada. Because this rail line currently operates in a directional running setup across most of Nevada, the California Zephyr will switch to the Central Corridor at either Winnemucca or Wells.

== In popular culture ==
The joining of the Union Pacific line with the Central Pacific line in May 1869 at Promontory Summit, Utah, was one of the major inspirations for French writer Jules Verne's book entitled Around the World in Eighty Days, published in 1873.

While not exactly accurate, John Ford's 1924 silent movie The Iron Horse captures the fervent nationalism that drove public support for the project. Among the cooks serving the film's cast and crew between shots were some of the Chinese laborers who worked on the Central Pacific section of the railroad.

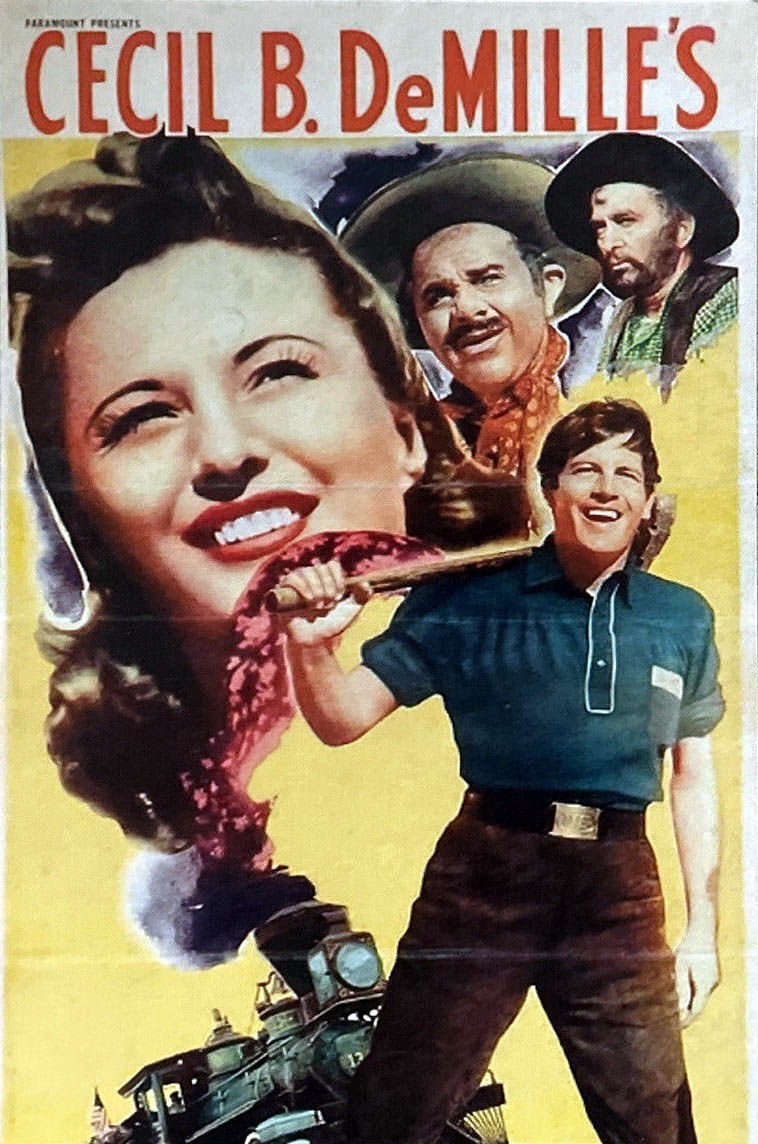
Postcard for the film Union Pacific, released in May 1939

The feat is depicted in various movies, including the 1939 film Union Pacific, starring Joel McCrea and Barbara Stanwyck and directed by Cecil B. DeMille, which depicts the fictional Central Pacific investor Asa Barrows obstructing attempts of the Union Pacific to reach Ogden, Utah.

The 1939 movie is said to have inspired the Union Pacific Western television series starring Jeff Morrow, Judson Pratt and Susan Cummings which aired in syndication from 1958 until 1959.

The 1962 film How the West Was Won has a whole segment devoted to the construction; one of the movie's most famous scenes, filmed in Cinerama, is of a buffalo stampede over the railroad.

The construction of what presumably is—or is suggested to be—the transcontinental railroad provides the backdrop of the 1968 epic Spaghetti Western Once Upon a Time in the West, directed by Italian director Sergio Leone.

Graham Masterton's 1981 novel A Man of Destiny (published in the UK as Railroad) is a fictionalized account of the line's construction.

The 1993 children's book Ten Mile Day by Mary Ann Fraser tells the story of the record setting push by the Central Pacific in which they set a record by laying 10 miles (16 km) of track in a single day on April 28, 1869, to settle a $10,000 bet.

Kristiana Gregory's 1999 book The Great Railroad Race (part of the "Dear America" series) is written as the fictional diary of Libby West, who chronicles the end of the railroad construction and the excitement that engulfed the country at the time.

In the 1999 Will Smith film Wild Wild West, the joining ceremony is the setting of an assassination attempt on then U.S. President Ulysses S. Grant by the film's antagonist Dr. Arliss Loveless.

The main character in The Claim (2000) is a surveyor for the Central Pacific Railroad, and the film is partially about the efforts of a frontier mayor to have the railroad routed through his town.

In the 2002 DreamWorks Animation movie Spirit: Stallion of the Cimarron, the title character, a horse named Spirit, is delivered with other horses to pull a steam locomotive at a work site for the transcontinental railroad.

The American Experience series' 2002–2003 season documents the railway in the episode titled "Transcontinental Railroad".

The building of the railway is covered by the 2004 BBC documentary series Seven Wonders of the Industrial World in episode 6, "The Line".

The popular sci-fi television show Doctor Who featured the transcontinental railroad in a 2010 BBC audiobook entitled The Runaway Train, read by Matt Smith and written for audio by Oli Smith.

The construction of the transcontinental railroad provides the setting for the AMC television series Hell on Wheels. Thomas Durant is a regular character in the series and is portrayed by actor Colm Meaney.

The campaign mode of Kalypso Media's 2018 video game Railway Empire covers the construction of the transcontinental railroad and features key figures such as Thomas Durant and Collis Huntington.

== See also ==
- Chin Lin Sou
- Patrick Healy (sheepman)
- History of rail transportation in California
- Interstate 80 – present-day New York-to-San Francisco transport link (highway)
- List of heritage railroads in the United States
- Overland Route (Union Pacific Railroad)
- Transcontinental railroad
