= Leviathan (locomotive) =

American steam locomotive

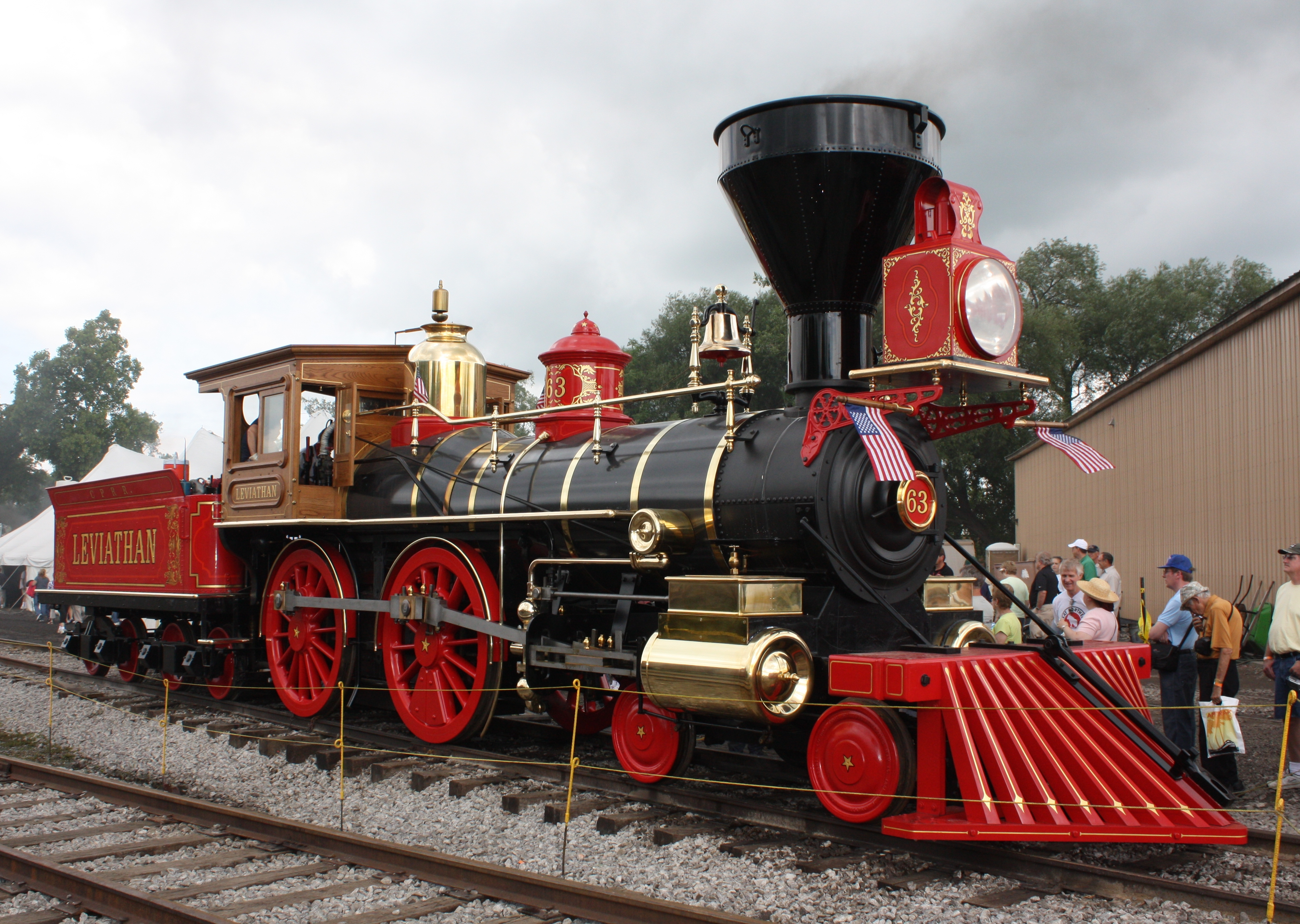
- Leviathan replica at 2009 train festival in Owosso, Michigan
Type and origin
- Power type: Steam
- Builder: Schenectady Locomotive Works (original); Dave Kloke (Kloke Locomotive Works) (replica)
- Serial number: 512 (original)
- Build date: September 1868 (original); 2009 (replica)
Specifications
- Configuration
  - Whyte: 4-4-0
- Gauge: 4 ft 8 1/2 in (1,435 mm) standard gauge
- Fuel type: Wood, converted to coal in 1893
Career
- Operators: Central Pacific Railroad, Southern Pacific Railroad
- Numbers: 63 (CP), renumbered 1197 in 1891; Replica renumbered PRR 331 in 2018
- Official name: Leviathan
- First run: April 5, 1869
- Current owner: Stone Gable Estates (Replica)
- Disposition: Original scrapped in 1901, replica built in 2009 and is operational on the Harrisburg, Lincoln and Lancaster Railroad

The Leviathan, officially known as Central Pacific #63 and currently operating as Pennsylvania Railroad 331, is a 4-4-0 steam locomotive owned by the Central Pacific Railroad. It was notable for helping construct the First transcontinental railroad before hauling Leland Stanford's special train, which was then passed on to sister engine #60, the Jupiter, to take part in the railroad's completion in 1869.

The Leviathan was built in September 1868 by the Schenectady Locomotive Works in New York, along with three other identical engines, numbered 60, 61, and 62, respectively named the Jupiter, Storm, and Whirlwind. These were dismantled and sailed to San Francisco, California, before being sent to the Central Pacific headquarters in Sacramento for reassembly. The Jupiter was the first to be commissioned into service on March 20, 1869, followed by the Whirlwind on April 4 of that year, and the Storm and Leviathan entered service the following day, April 5, 1869.

== Original engine ==
The Leviathan was used on passenger, general goods, and construction trains on the farthest end of the Central Pacific Railroad’s line in Utah, just miles from the Union Pacific Railroad’s own end of line. One month after entering service, the Leviathan made history by hauling Governor Leland Stanford's special train to Camp Victory in Toano, Nevada, and from there it was picked up by sister engine Jupiter and taken to the ceremony in Promontory.

After the ceremony, the Leviathan found itself in more regular usage on the Central Pacific. In the early 1870s, the railroad had stopped naming their engines and the Leviathan became CP #63. When the Southern Pacific Railroad gained control of Central Pacific Railroad, CP #63 was renumbered and heavily modified, including a conversion to burn coal instead of wood. It was scrapped at the start of 20th century, with its historical significance not recognized until decades later.

== Replica engine ==
Between 1999 and 2009, the Kloke Locomotive Works, run by Dave Kloke, constructed a full-size replica of the Leviathan, borrowing plans, research, blueprints, and patterns from the construction of the replica of the Jupiter by O'Connor Engineering, in order to match the specifications and details. The replica however was also fitted with modern-day features upon construction, including an oil bunker, a small headlight on the rear of the tender, air brakes, and a varnished wooden cab. The replica made a few test runs prior to its unveiling over the rails of the Fox River Trolley Museum of South Elgin, IL, close to site of the Kloke Locomotive Works in Elgin, IL. The replica made its first public appearance at the 2009 train festival in Owosso, Michigan, being hosted by the Steam Railroading Institute. Between 2009 and 2018, the replica of the Leviathan had visited various tourist railroads and museums across the Midwest and Eastern United States for special events, including the Saratoga and North Creek Railway in North Creek, New York, the Illinois Railway Museum in Union, Illinois, and the Age of Steam Roundhouse in Sugarcreek, Ohio.

In 2018, the Leviathan replica was acquired by the Stone Gable Estates, which opened both the Star Barn Complex and the Harrisburg, Lincoln and Lancaster Railroad in Elizabethtown, Pennsylvania. The locomotive currently operates as Pennsylvania Railroad 331, the locomotive that pulled President Abraham Lincoln's funeral train in 1865. It is expected to operate an estimated 100+ days a year for public excursions, special and private events.

In November 2025, the PRR 331 underwent a 1472-day inspection and rebuild, which was unveiled on November 6th to have been completed by Horneman Enterprises, an independent railroad contractor and consulting company, within a period of 10 months.
