= Jupiter (locomotive) =

Early American 4-4-0 steam locomotive

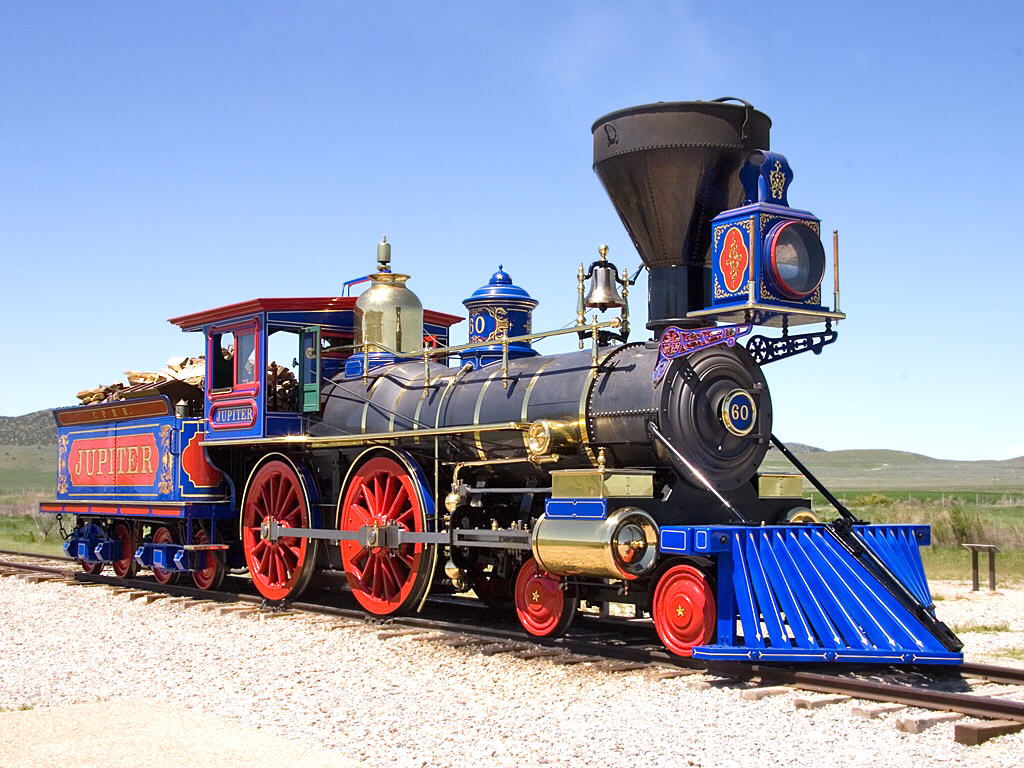
- Jupiter replica at Golden Spike N.H.P.
Type and origin
- Power type: Steam
- Builder: Schenectady Locomotive Works (original); O'Connor Engineering Laboratories (replica)
- Serial number: 505 (original); 2050302 (replica)
- Build date: September 1868 (original); May 1979 (replica)
Specifications
- Configuration
  - Whyte: 4-4-0
- Gauge: 4 ft 8 1/2 in (1,435 mm) standard gauge
- Driver dia.: 5 ft 4 in (1,626 mm)
- Frame type: Bar
- Adhesive weight: 18 short tons (16 long tons; 16 t)
- Loco weight: 27 short tons (24 long tons; 24 t)
- Fuel type: Original: Wood, converted to coal in 1893; Replica: Oil, converted to wood in 1991
- Water cap.: 2,000 US gal (7,600 L; 1,700 imp gal)
- Firebox
  - Grate area: 14.5 sq ft (1.35 m^{2})
- Boiler pressure: Original: 120 psi (830 kPa); Replica: 160 psi (1,100 kPa)
- Cylinders: Two, outside
- Cylinder size: 16 in (406 mm) diameter × 24 in (610 mm) stroke
Performance figures
- Tractive effort: 9,523 lb (4,320 kg)
Career
- Operators: Central Pacific Railroad → Southern Pacific Railroad, Gila Valley, Globe and Northern Railway
- Numbers: 60 (CP), renum 1195 in 1891, GVG&N 1 in 1893
- Official name: Jupiter
- First run: March 20, 1869
- Current owner: Golden Spike N.H.P.
- Disposition: Original scrapped in 1909; replica built in 1979 and is operational at the Golden Spike N.H.P.

The Jupiter (officially known as Central Pacific Railroad #60) is a 4-4-0 "American" type steam locomotive owned by the Central Pacific Railroad. It made history when it joined the Union Pacific 119 at Promontory Summit, Utah, during the golden spike ceremony commemorating the completion of the first transcontinental railroad in 1869.

The Jupiter was built in September 1868 by the Schenectady Locomotive Works of New York, along with three other engines of identical specifications, numbered 61, 62, and 63 named the Storm, Whirlwind, and Leviathan, respectively. These were then dismantled and sailed to San Francisco, California, loaded onto a river barge, and sent to the Central Pacific headquarters in Sacramento. After reassembly the Jupiter was commissioned into service on March 20, 1869, with the other three entering service within the following month.

== History ==
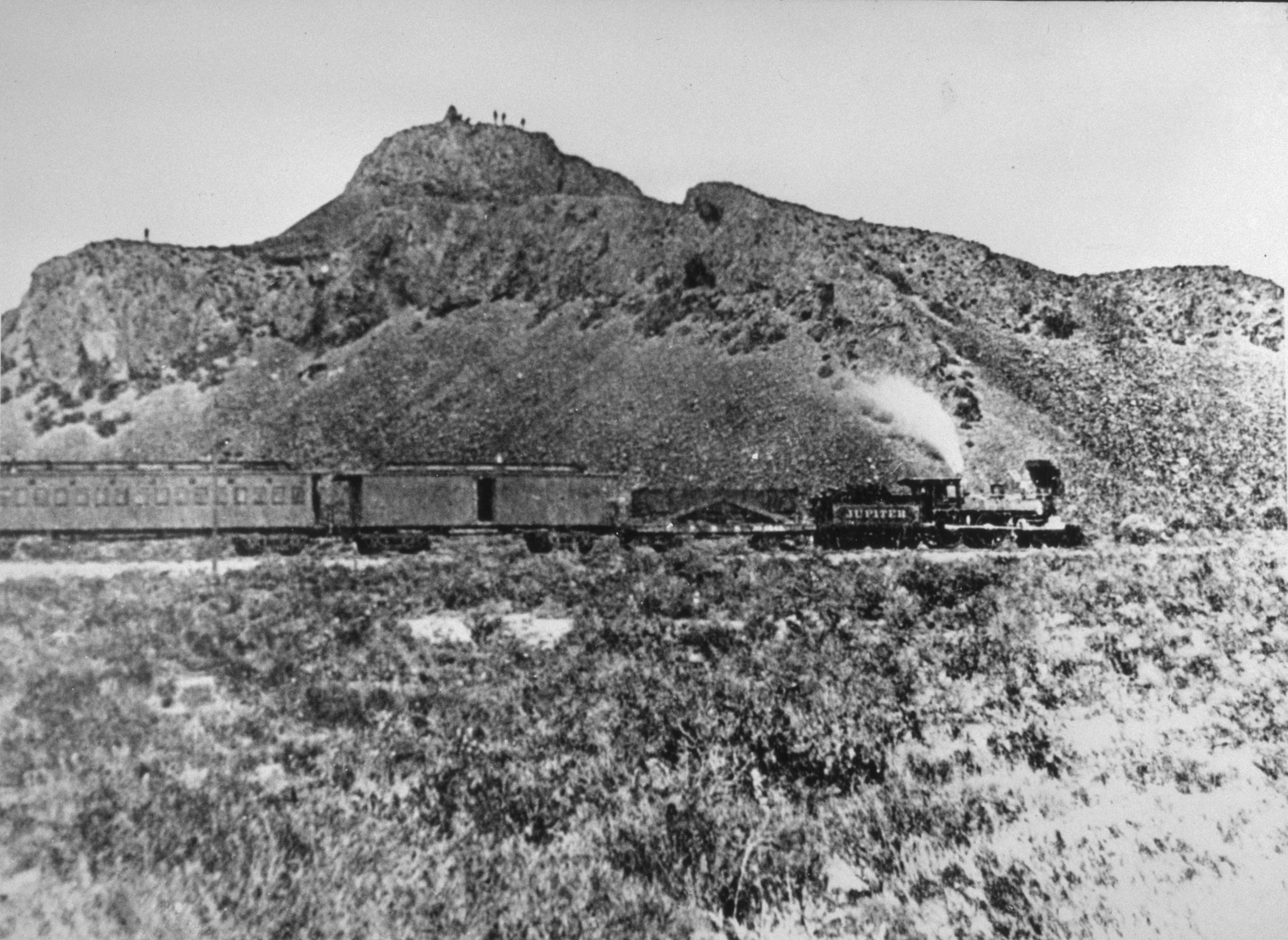
The Jupiter leads the train that carried Leland Stanford, one of the "Big Four" owners of the Central Pacific Railroad, and other railway officials to the Golden Spike Ceremony.

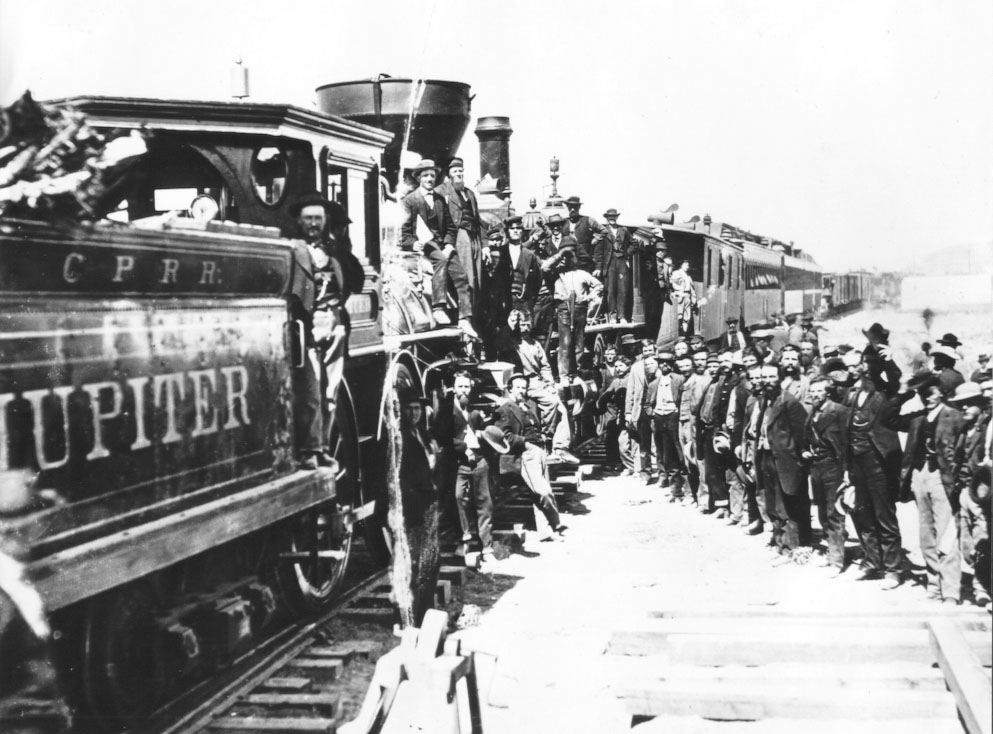
Celebration of completion of the Transcontinental Railroad, May 10, 1869, showing the name Jupiter on the side of the tender

The Jupiter was assigned to the railroad's Salt Lake Division, the third and eastern most segment of the road traveling east from Sacramento, operating in passenger and general goods services as well as construction trains from Toano, Nevada to Promontory Summit, and later Ogden, Utah. When Leland Stanford's train had arrived in Toano, en route to Promontory, its engine was removed from the train and readied for another westbound train, while the Jupiter was to carry Stanford's train on the final leg of its journey to the Golden Spike Ceremony.

== Post-ceremony career ==
After the ceremony, Jupiter continued in service for the Central Pacific. In the 1870s, the railroad decided to end their practice of naming their engines, and thus, the Jupiter name was dropped and the engine was simply known as C.P. #60. The locomotive also received many upgrades, including a new boiler, cowcatcher, domes, and smokestack. In 1891, the Southern Pacific, which acquired the Central Pacific in 1885, began renumbering its locomotives, and C.P. #60 became S.P. #1195. In 1893 it was converted to burn coal, and later that year was sold to the Gila Valley, Globe and Northern Railway and designated GVG&N #1. In 1909, the railway, which had been acquired by the Southern Pacific in 1901, sold the engine for scrap.

== Reproductions ==
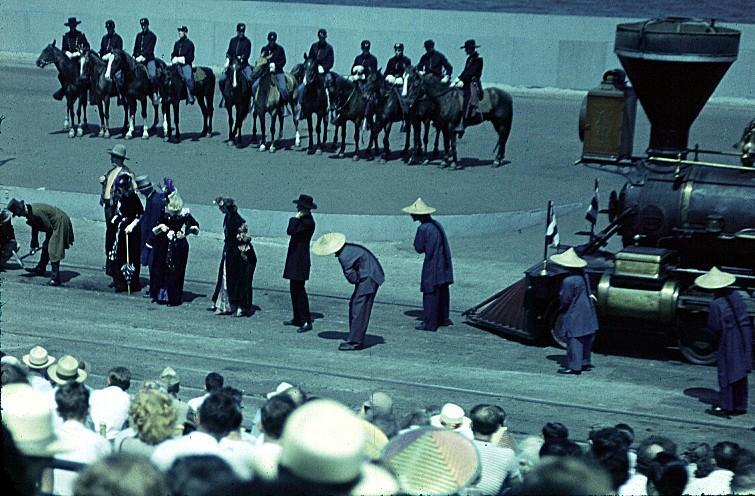
A Golden Spike ceremony reenactment at the 1949 Chicago Railroad Fair, with the Virginia and Truckee railroad's Genoa painted and lettered to resemble the Jupiter

The Southern Pacific, by 1901, had been placed under the control of the Union Pacific, the management of which remained largely indifferent towards both the Jupiter and the railroad's own no. 119, acknowledging neither's historical significance until well after being scrapped. For events such as the 1939 New York World's Fair and the Chicago Railroad Fair, the Virginia and Truckee Railroad's cosmetically altered Genoa locomotive stood in for the Jupiter in reenactments of the Golden Spike ceremony.

In 1924 John Ford made the movie The Iron Horse, which showed a depiction of the ceremony with a title card that reads, "The wedding of the rails -- celebrated with joyous exultation in the uniting of East and West. The afternoon of May 10, 1869. Note: The locomotives shown in the scene are the original Jupiter and [sic] #116."

The 1939 film Union Pacific also featured a recreation of the ceremony, in which the Jupiter was portrayed by Virginia and Truckee Railroad's Inyo. In 1969, in observation of the centennial of the Golden Spike, the Genoa again portrayed the Jupiter, posing on a section of restored trackage at the Golden Spike National Historic Park with the Virginia and Truckee's Reno portraying the Union Pacific no. 119. The same year, the Union Pacific operated a special exhibition train, consisting of the Virginia and Truckee's Inyo and Dayton as proxies, along with vintage railroad construction equipment, all displayed on flatcars, which toured various parts of the Union Pacific network through the year. In 1970, the Reno was sold to Old Tucson Studios, while the Genoa was returned to the state of California, with the Inyo and Dayton replacing them as displays at Promontory.

In 1974, the National Park Service had approached O'Connor Engineering Laboratories of Costa Mesa, California, to construct exact, full-size replicas of the Jupiter and Union Pacific 119. As was the case with the engines themselves, no drawings or plans of the engines survived, necessitating entirely new drawings to be produced based mostly on photos of the engines as well as research done on similar engines built around the same time. That same year, the existing engines portraying the Jupiter and 119 (the Inyo and Dayton, respectively), had been sold to the state of Nevada, though they remained displayed at the Golden Spike NHP until the construction of the new replicas was complete. Noted railroad historian and steam engine owner Gerald M. Best served as engineering consultant to the Park Service for the project. Former Disney animator Ward Kimball was given the task of painting the replicas. The Jupiter was given a bright red paint scheme with gold leafing, typical of locomotives built in the 1870s.

The replicas were completed in 1979, and began operations on May 10 of that year, 110 years after the original Golden Spike ceremony, and continue to make demonstration runs. The replicas originally burned oil, with the wood in the Jupiter's tender being purely aesthetic. In 1991, the Jupiter and 119 replicas were converted to wood and coal burning engines, respectively.

In the early 1990s, a vague description of the Jupiter's livery had been found in a recently uncovered March 1869 issue of The Sacramento Bee, in which the engine was said to be blue, crimson, and gold. The engine was repainted into its current livery based on this finding along with further research on liveries of similar engines of the time. The repainted engine debuted on May 10, 1994, coinciding with the 125th anniversary of the Golden Spike ceremony. Additional research has pointed out the managers of the Schenectady locomotive works at the time the original locomotive was built were Scottish, and as such likely would have painted the Jupiter in a shade of blue reminiscent of the Caledonian Railway livery, substantially darker than the shade currently worn by the replica locomotive.

== Other historic Jupiter locomotives ==
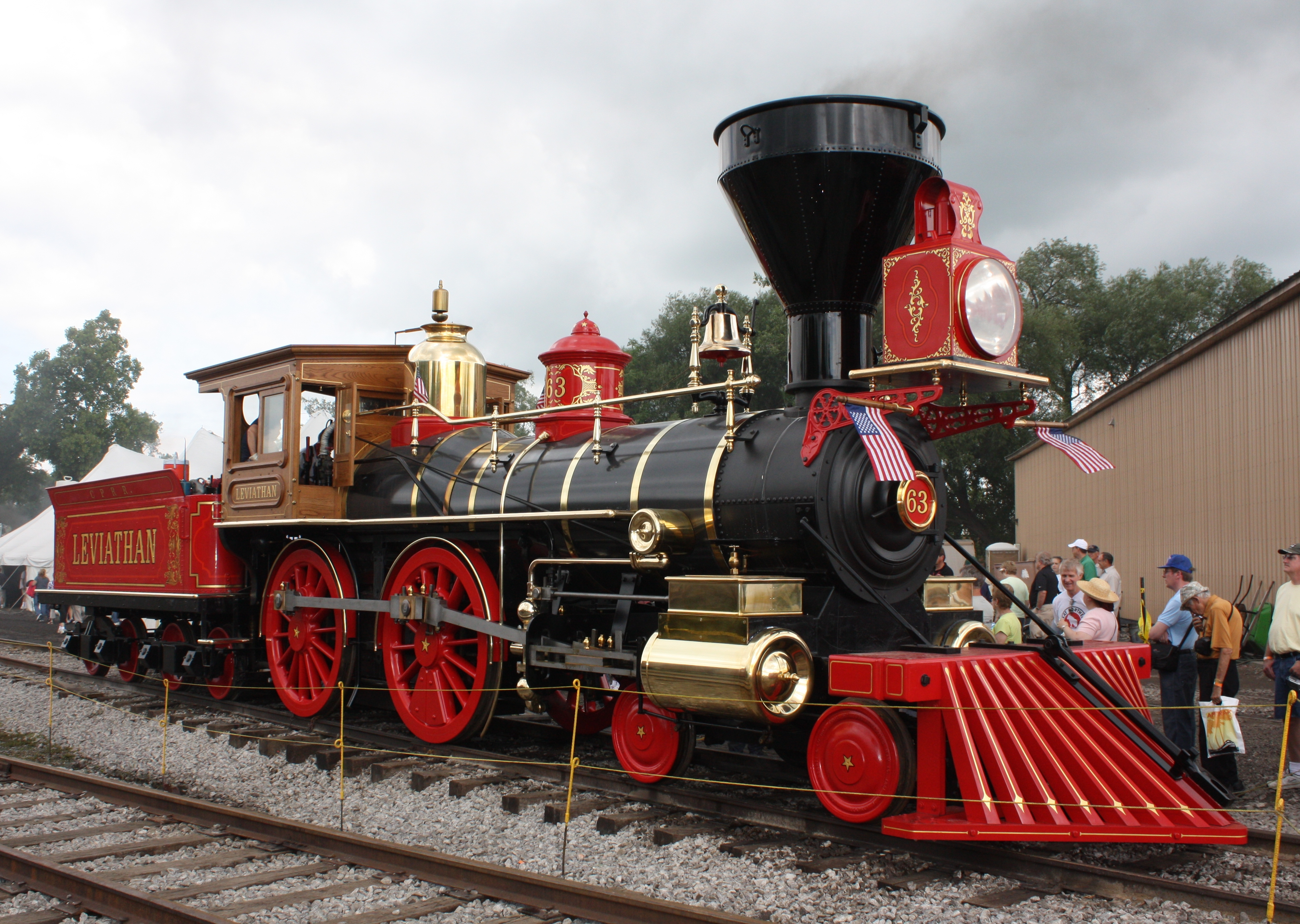
The replica of Jupiter's sister engine, Leviathan, (C.P. no. 63) operating at the 2009 Train Festival

In Roman mythology, Jupiter was known as "King of Gods" or "God of Sky", and it was common for railroads of the 1800s to name engines after this and other mythological legends to invoke awe and wonder. Thus, there have been many engines named "Jupiter" by their respective railroads that, apart from the name, had little else in common with the engine of Golden Spike fame. One such engine is Santa Cruz Railroad no. 3, also named Jupiter. This engine, owned by the Smithsonian Museum, is also a wood-burning 4-4-0. However, this engine was built for narrow-gauge track, unlike the broader standard gauge of the trains at the Golden Spike ceremony.

In 2009, Kloke Locomotive Works built a full-size replica of one of the Jupiter's sibling engines, the Leviathan, No. 63, which is in operating condition. It was rented by multiple tourist railroads until being purchased by Stone Gable Estates in 2018 for operation on the Harrisburg, Lincoln and Lancaster Railroad in Elizabethtown, Pennsylvania. Stone Gable Estates relettered the locomotive as Pennsylvania Railroad No. 331, a now-scrapped steam locomotive that pulled Abraham Lincoln's funeral train.

== See also ==
- List of heritage railroads in the United States
