= Schenectady Locomotive Works =

Defunct locomotive manufacturer in Schenectady, New York, United States

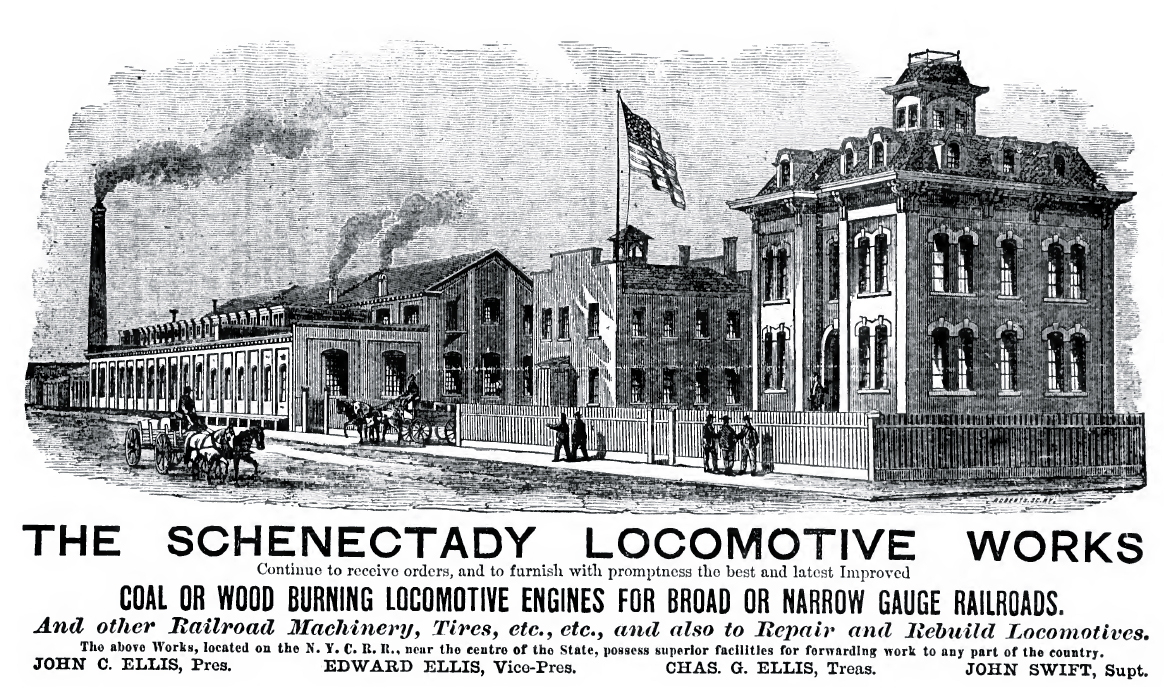
- Advertisement from the 1870s
- Founded: 1848
- Founder: Norris Brothers
- Defunct: 1901
- Fate: Merged
- Successor: American Locomotive Company
- Headquarters: Schenectady, New York
- Products: Locomotives
- Footnotes built the famous Jupiter

The Schenectady Locomotive Works was a factory in Schenectady, New York, that manufactured railroad locomotives from its founding in 1848 through its merger into American Locomotive Company (ALCO) in 1901.

After the 1901 merger, ALCO made the Schenectady plant its headquarters.

One of the better-known locomotives to come out of the Schenectady shops was Central Pacific Railroad type 4-4-0 No. 60, the Jupiter (built in September 1868), one of two steam locomotives to take part in the "Golden Spike Ceremony" to celebrate the completion of the First transcontinental railroad. Although the original was scrapped in 1909, a full-scale, operating replica was completed in 1979, and now is part of an operational display at the Golden Spike National Historical Park.

== Preserved Schenectady locomotives ==
Following is a list (in serial number order) of preserved Schenectady locomotives built before the ALCO merger. All locations are in the United States unless otherwise noted.

Serial no.	Type (Whyte notation)	Build date	Operational owner(s)	Disposition
2409	0-6-0	October 1887	Outer Harbor Terminal Railway #2	Los Angeles County Fairplex, Pomona, California
3114	2-8-0	1890	Southern Railway #154	Gulf and Ohio Railways, Knoxville, Tennessee - She is operational.
4552	4-6-0	June 1897	Indiana Harbor Belt Railroad #15	Abandoned in the Maine North Woods following Eagle Lake and West Branch Railroad service.
4807	4-8-0	October 1898	Southern Pacific Railroad #2914	Kern County Museum, Bakersfield, California
5007	4-6-0	March 1899	Rio Grande Southern Railroad #20	Colorado Railroad Museum, Golden, Colorado - Recently restored to operation on July 2, 2020.
5103	2-6-0	1899	Acadia Coal Company #42	Museum of Industry, Stellarton, Nova Scotia, Canada
5129	2-8-0	September 1899	Northern Pacific Railway #25	Civic Center, Butte, Montana
5613	4-4-2	June 1900	Chicago and North Western Railway #1015	National Museum of Transport, Kirkwood, Missouri
5680	2-6-0	November 1900	Southern Pacific Railroad #1629	Newhall, California
5683	2-6-0	November 1900	Southern Pacific Railroad #1673	Southern Pacific Depot, Tucson, Arizona

== Gallery ==
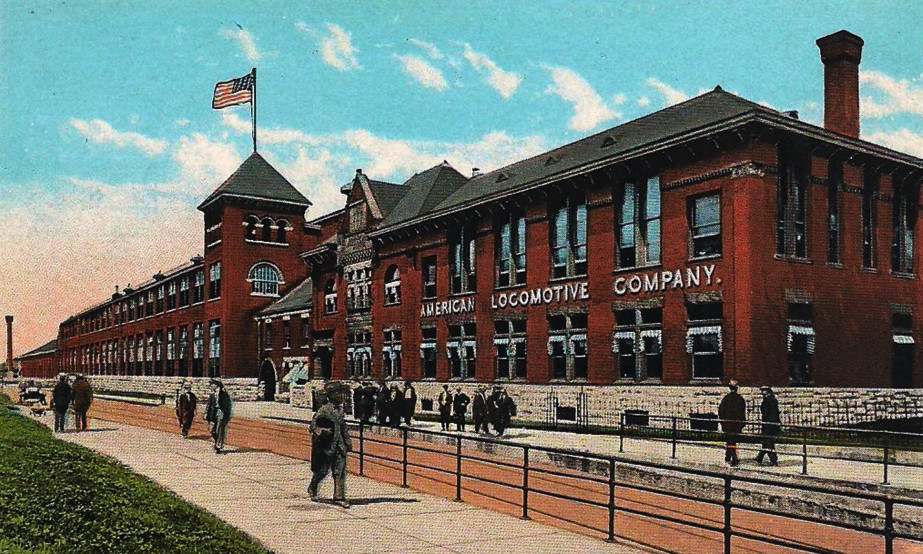
The plant circa 1920.

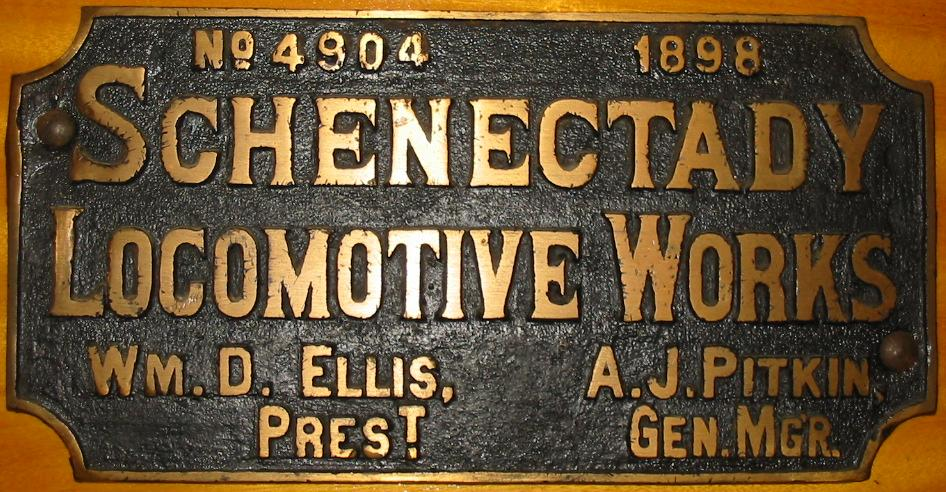
A Schenectady builder's plate of 1898 from Northern Pacific Railway class Y 2-8-0 #34.

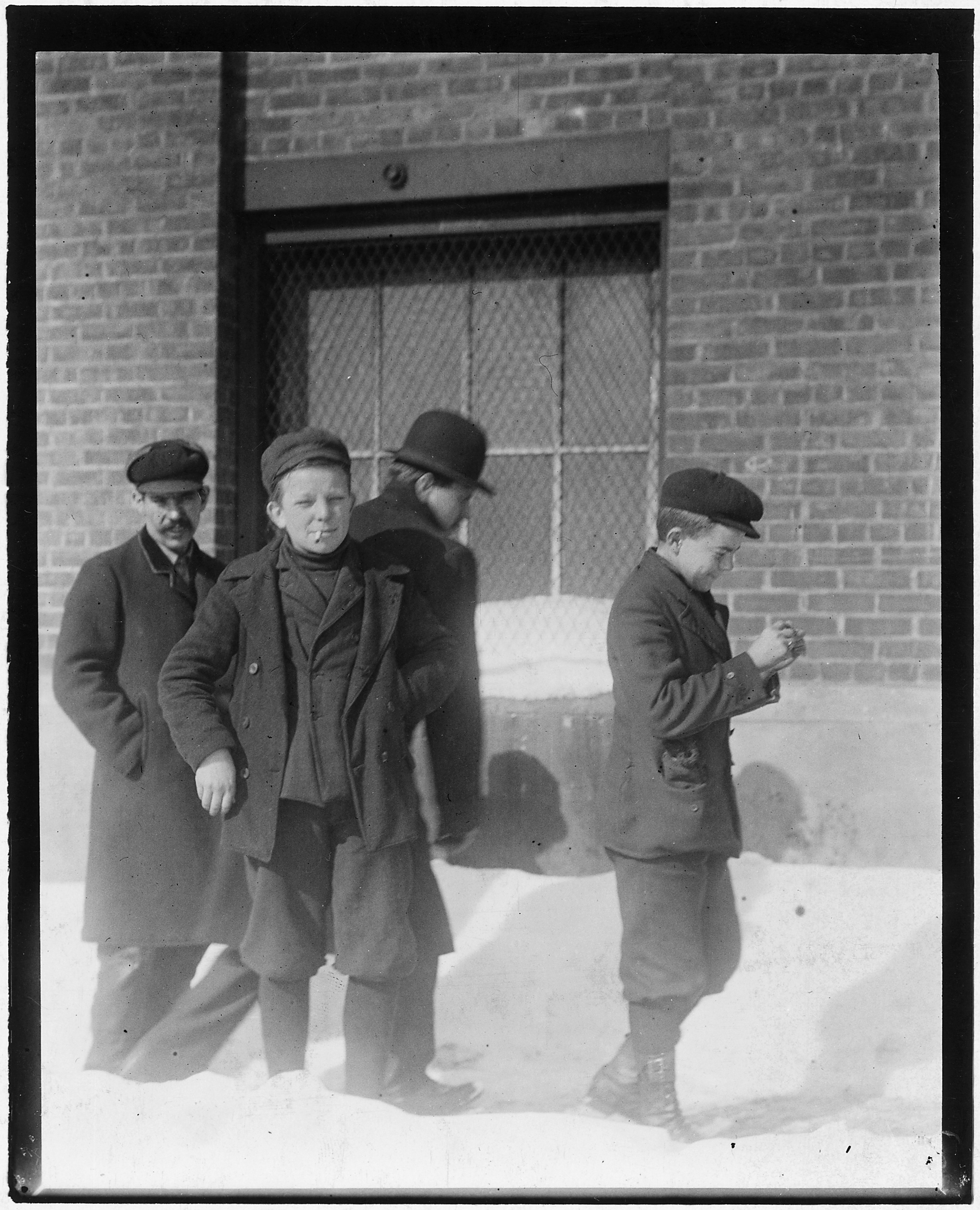
Boys going to work, 1910

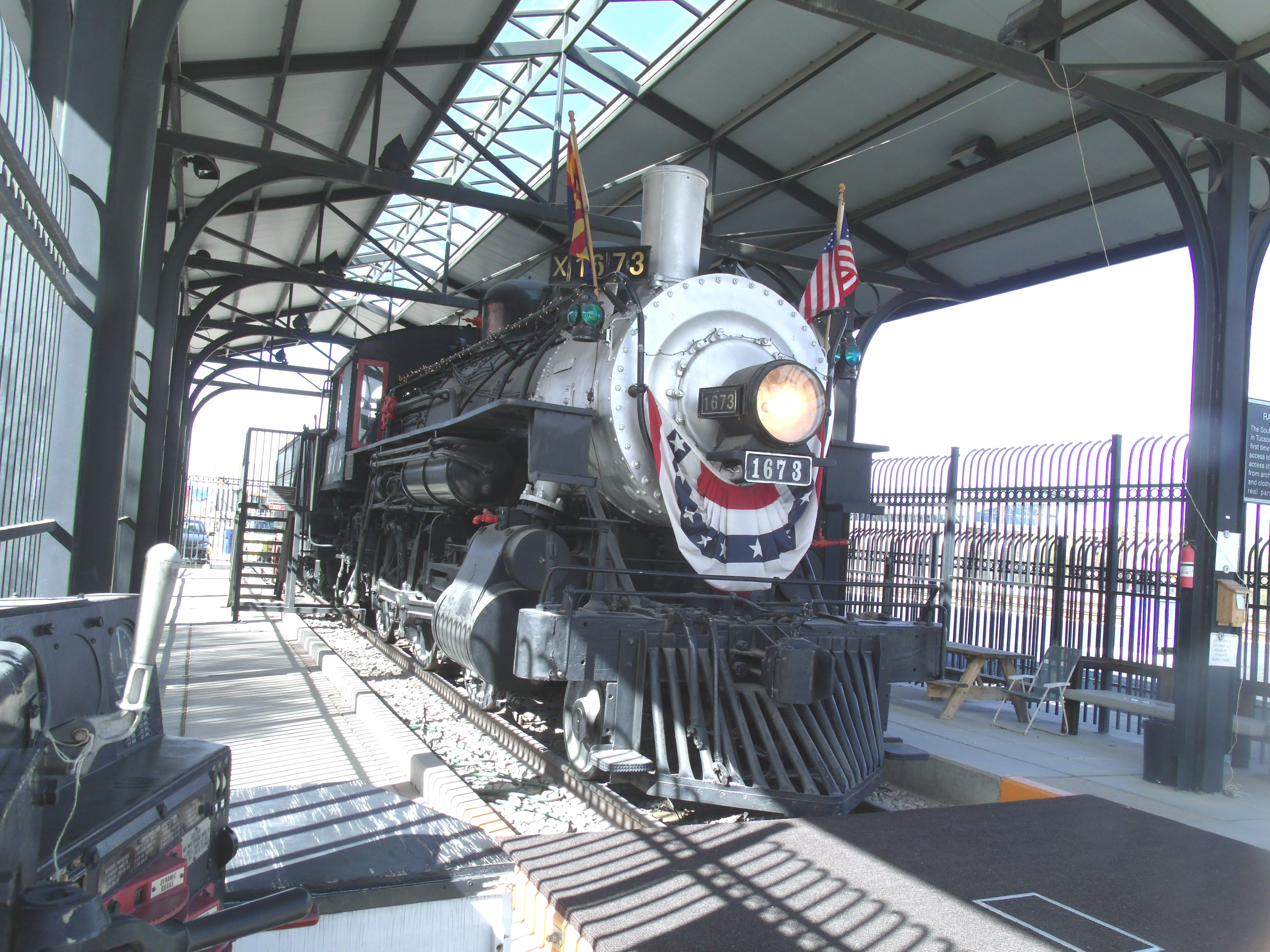
Southern Pacific Railroad Locomotive No. 1673 on display in the Southern Arizona Transportation Museum

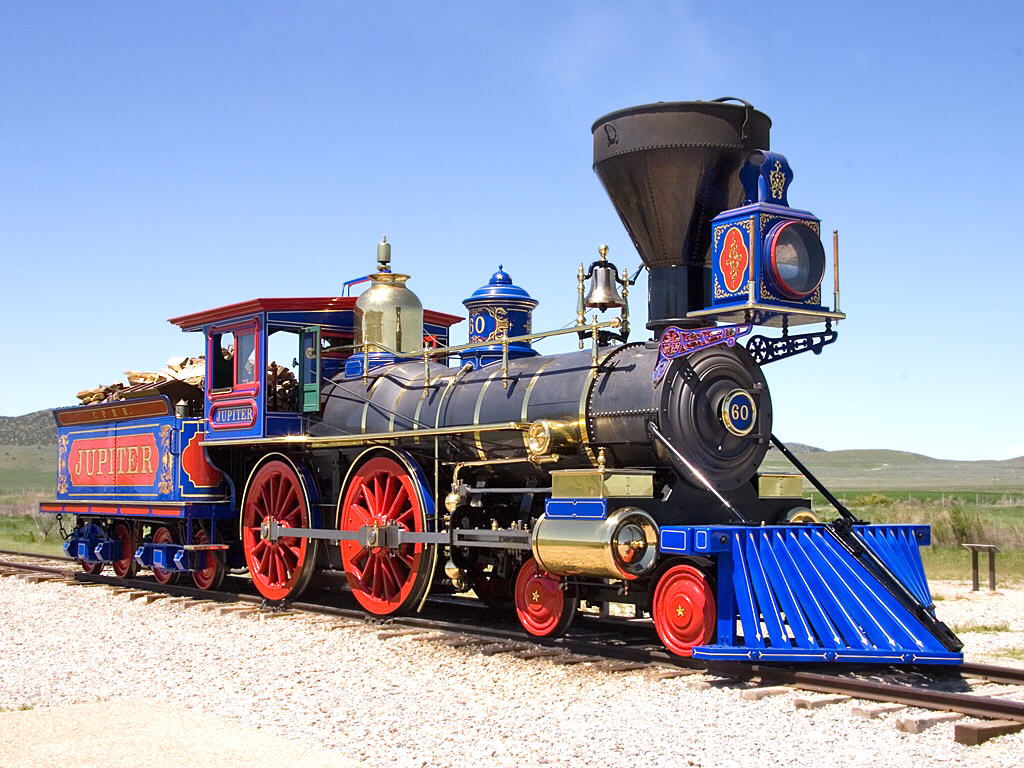
Replica of Central Pacific No. 60 Jupiter at Golden Spike N.H.P.

== See also ==
- GE Transportation, Schenectady, NY; headquarters and Locomotive Division
- List of locomotive builders
