= Golden spike =

Ceremonial spike driven in a US Railroad

Coordinates: 41°37′4.67″N 112°33′5.87″W

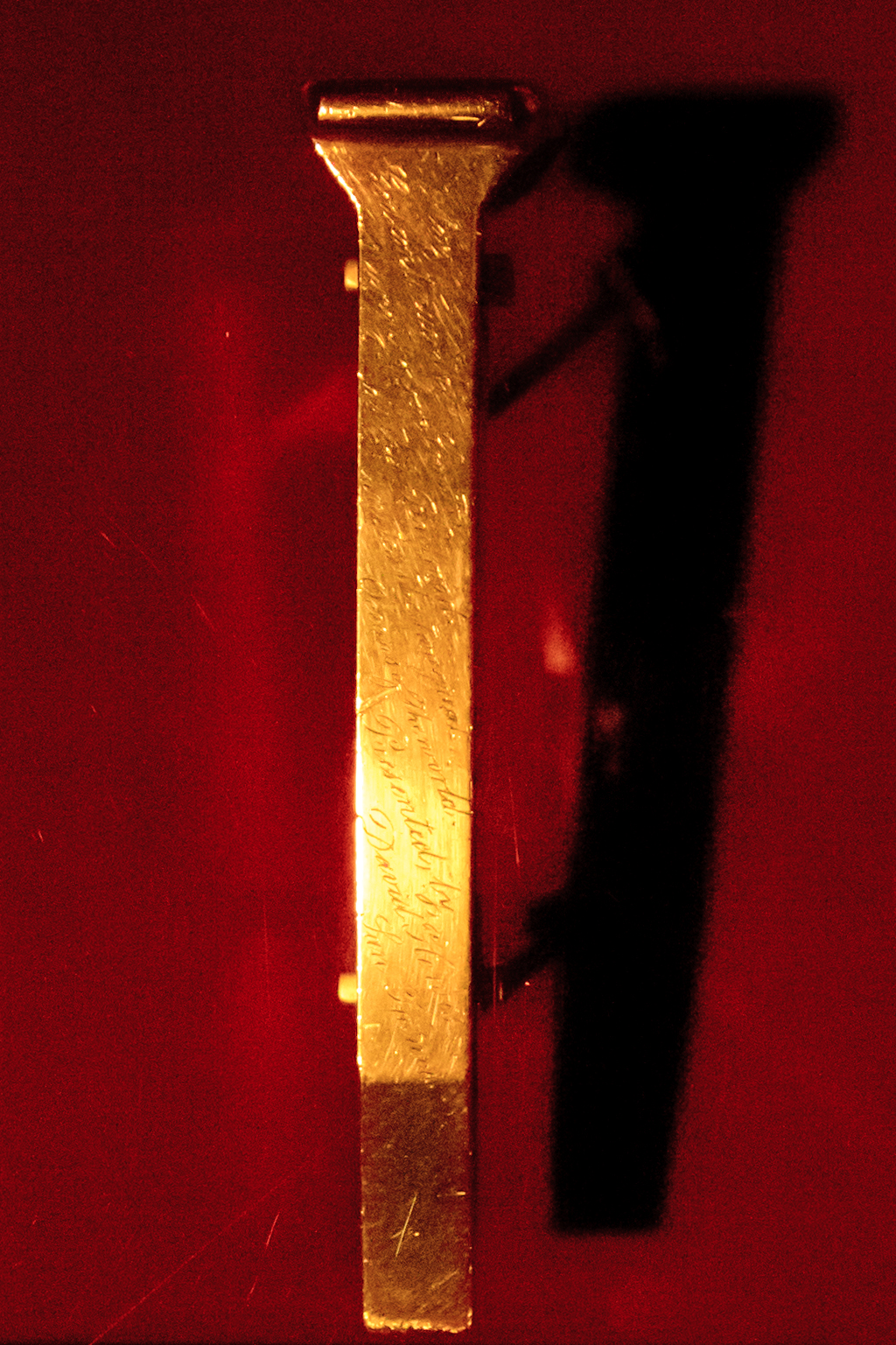
The original "golden spike" is on display at the Cantor Arts Museum at Stanford University.

The golden spike (also known as the last spike) is the ceremonial 17.6-karat gold spike driven to mark the completion of the first transcontinental railroad across the United States. It was driven by Leland Stanford to connect the Central Pacific Railroad from Sacramento and the Union Pacific Railroad from Omaha on May 10, 1869, at Promontory Summit, Utah Territory. The spike is now displayed in the Cantor Arts Center at Stanford University.

The term last spike has since been used to refer to a spike driven at the usually ceremonial completion of a railroad construction project, particularly one in which construction is undertaken from two origins toward a meeting point.

== History ==
Completing the last link in the transcontinental railroad with a spike of gold was the brainchild of David Hewes, a San Francisco financier and contractor. The spike was manufactured in 1869 especially for the May event by the William T. Garratt Foundry in San Francisco. Two of the sides were engraved with the names of the railroad officers and directors. A special tie of polished California laurel was chosen to complete the line where the spike would be driven. The ceremony was planned to be held on May 8 (the date engraved on the spike), but it was postponed two days because of bad weather and a labor dispute that delayed the arrival of the Union Pacific side of the rail line.

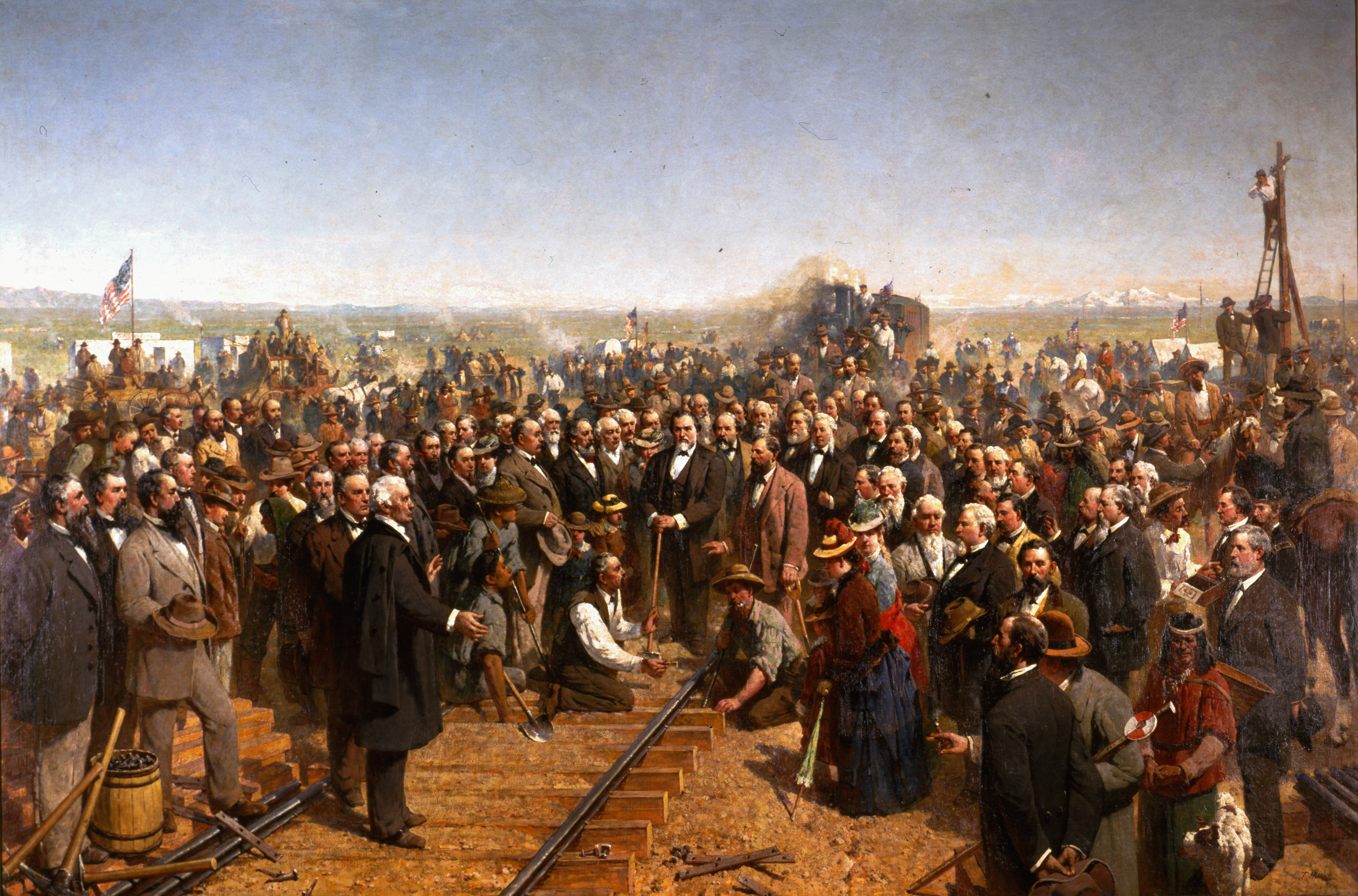
The Last Spike (1881) by Thomas Hill

On May 10, in anticipation of the ceremony, Union Pacific No. 119 and Central Pacific No. 60 (better known as the Jupiter) locomotives were drawn up face-to-face on Promontory Summit. How many people attended the event is unknown; estimates run from as few as 500 to as many as 3,000; government and railroad officials and track workers were present to witness the event.

Before the last spike was driven, three other commemorative spikes, presented on behalf of the three other members of the Central Pacific's Big Four who did not attend the ceremony, had been driven into their places in a pre-bored laurel tie:

- a second, lower-quality gold spike, supplied by the San Francisco News Letter, was made of what in 1869 was $200 worth of gold and inscribed: With this spike the San Francisco News Letter offers its homage to the great work which has joined the Atlantic and Pacific Oceans.
- a silver spike, supplied by the State of Nevada; forged, rather than cast, of 25 troy ounces (780 g) of unpolished silver
- a blended iron, silver, and gold spike, supplied by the Arizona Territory, engraved: Ribbed with iron clad in silver and crowned with gold Arizona presents her offering to the enterprise that has banded a continent and dictated a pathway to commerce. This spike was given to Union Pacific president, Oliver Ames, following the ceremony. The spike was donated to the Museum of the City of New York in 1943, by a descendant of Sidney Dillon. It was, for a time, on display at the Union Pacific Railroad Museum in Council Bluffs, Iowa. The Museum of the City of New York sold the spike in January 2023, via auction, to benefit other items in its collection. The winning bid totaled US$2.2 million

The golden spike was made of 17.6-karat (73%) copper-alloyed gold, and weighed 14.03 troy ounces (436 g). It was dropped into a drilled hole in the ceremonial last tie and gently tapped into place with a ceremonial silver spike maul. The golden spike was engraved on all four sides:

- The Pacific Railroad ground broken January 8, 1863, and completed May 8, 1869
- Directors of the C. P. R. R. of Cal. Hon. Leland Stanford. C. P. Huntington. E. B. Crocker. Mark Hopkins. A. P. Stanford. E. H. Miller Jr.
- Officers. Hon. Leland Stanford. Presdt. C. P. Huntington Vice Presdt. E. B. Crocker. Atty. Mark Hopkins. Tresr. Chas Crocker Gen. Supdt. E. H. Miller Jr. Secty. S. S. Montague. Chief Engr.
- May God continue the unity of our Country, as this Railroad unites the two great Oceans of the world. Presented by David Hewes San Francisco.

The original golden spike was removed immediately after being hammered in, to prevent it from being stolen.

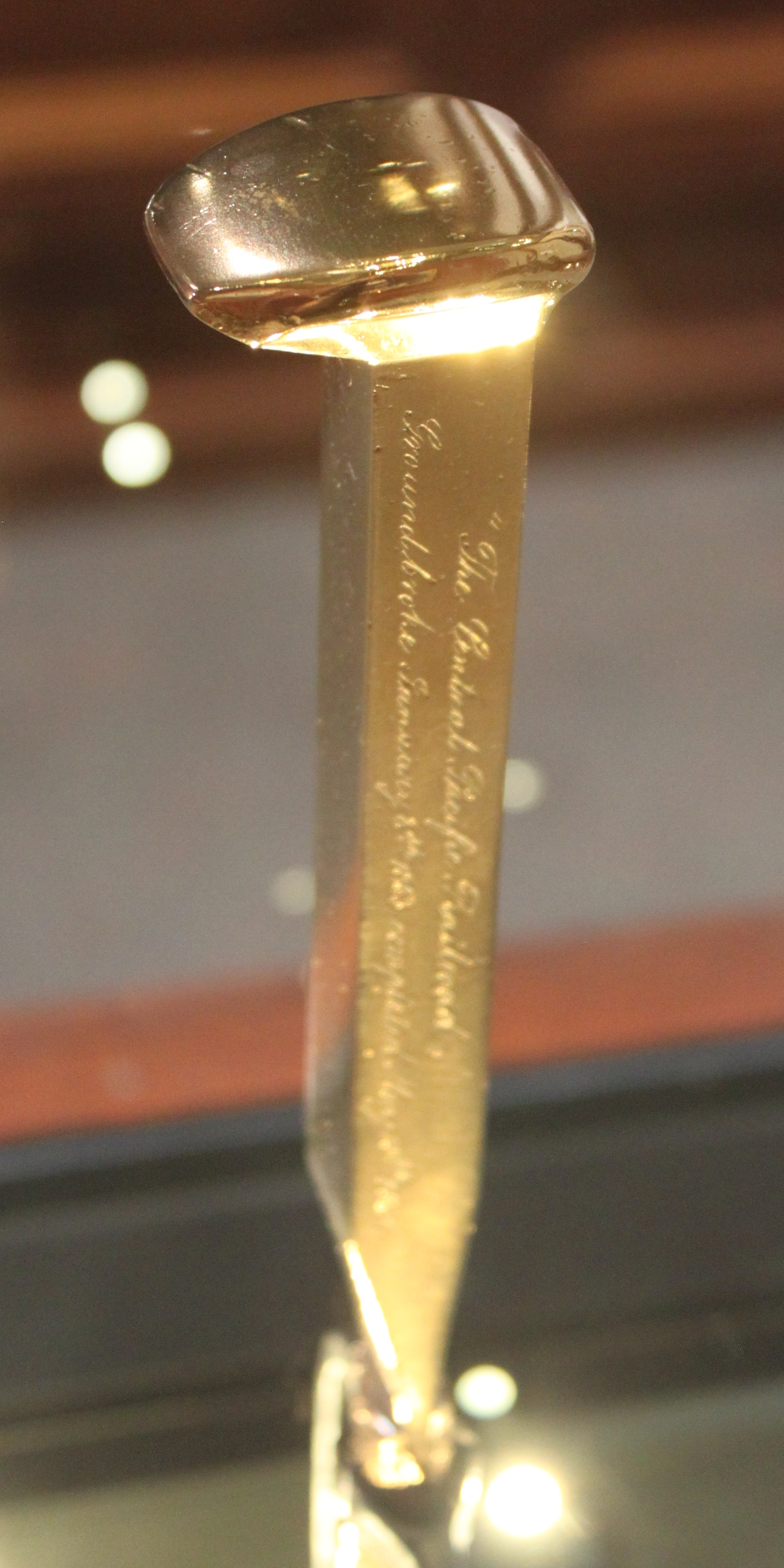
Duplicate Hewes Family Golden Spike (California State Railroad Museum)

A duplicate golden spike, exactly like the one used in the ceremony (except for the date), was cast at the same time, but engraved at a later time and bearing the correct Promontory date of May 10, 1869. It has been noted that the first Golden Spike engraving appeared "rushed". The duplicate golden spike, the Hewes family spike, bears lettering that appeared more polished. Unknown to the public, the duplicate golden spike was held by the Hewes family until 2005. It is now on permanent display, along with Thomas Hill's 1881 painting The Last Spike, at the California State Railroad Museum in Sacramento.

With the locomotives drawn so near, the crowd pressed so closely around Stanford and the other railroad officials that the ceremony became somewhat disorganized, leading to varying accounts of the events. On the Union Pacific side, thrusting westward, the last two rails were laid by Irishmen; on the Central Pacific side, thrusting eastward, the last two rails were laid by the Chinese! A. J. Russell stereoview No. 539 photograph shows the "Chinese at Laying Last Rail UPRR". Eight Chinese workers laid the last rail, and three of these men, Ging Cui, Wong Fook, and Lee Shao, lived long enough to participate in the 50th anniversary parade. At the conclusion of the ceremony, the participating Chinese workers were honored and cheered by the CPRR officials and that road's construction chief, J. H. Strobridge, at a dinner in his private railroad car.

To drive the final spike, Stanford lifted a silver spike maul and drove the spike into the tie, completing the line. Stanford and Hewes missed the spike, but the single word "done" was nevertheless flashed by telegraph around the country. In the United States, the event has come to be considered one of the first nationwide media events. The locomotives were moved forward until their cowcatchers met, and photographs were taken. Immediately afterward, the golden spike and the laurel tie were removed, lest they be stolen. They were replaced with a regular iron spike and normal railroad tie. At exactly 12:47 pm, the last iron spike was driven, finally completing the line.

After the ceremony, the Golden Spike used in the ceremony was donated to the Stanford Museum (now Cantor Arts Center) in 1898. The ceremonial laurel tie was destroyed in the fires caused by the 1906 San Francisco earthquake. A replica of the laurel tie, dedicated in late 2024, is on display in the Gravity Car Barn Museum on Mount Tamalpais.

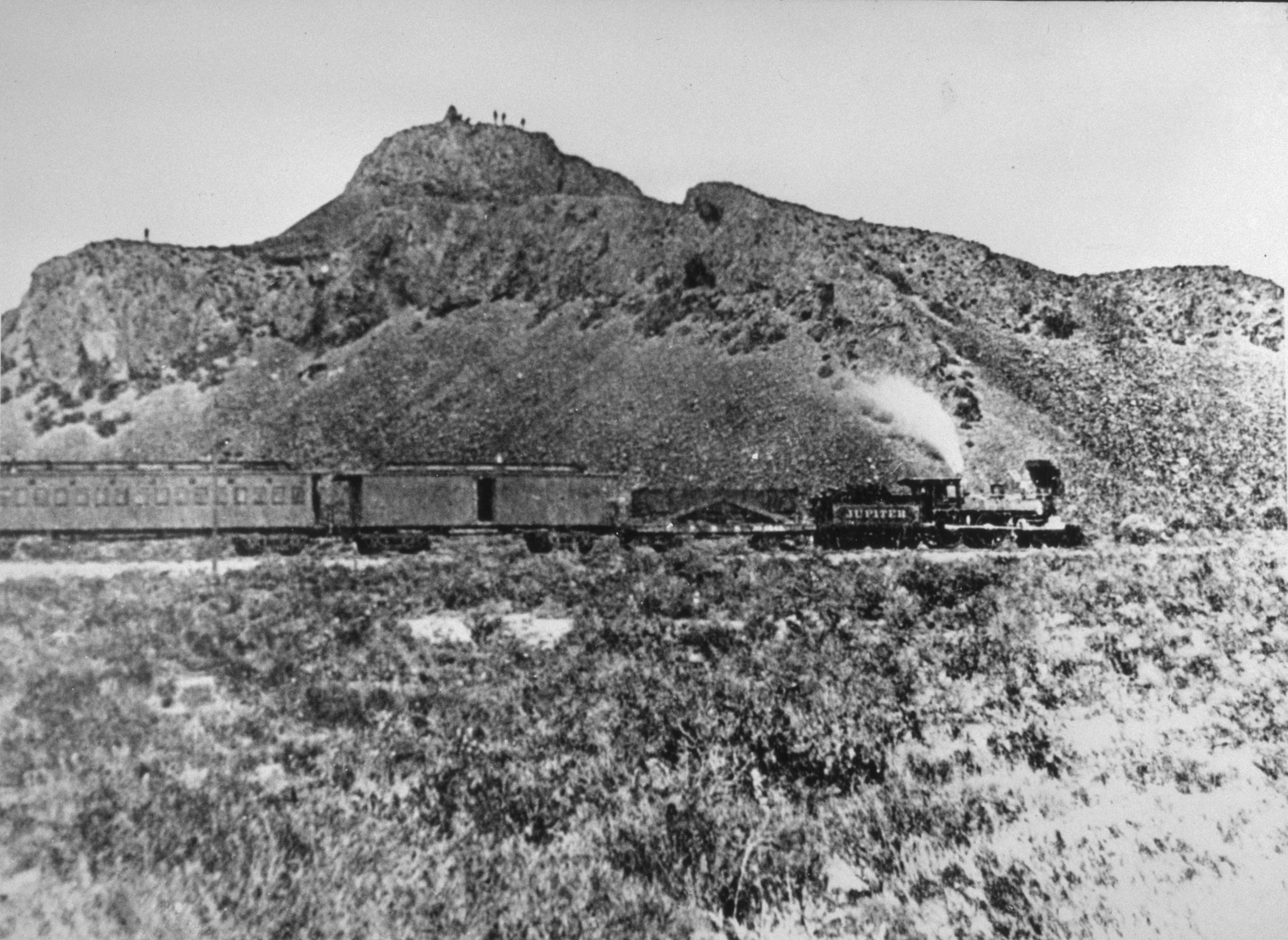
The Jupiter leads the train that carried the ceremonial spike, Leland Stanford, one of the "Big Four" owners of the Central Pacific Railroad, and other railway officials to the Golden Spike Ceremony.

Photograph by Andrew J. Russell of the celebration following the driving of the "Last Spike" at Promontory Summit, Utah, May 10, 1869. Because of temperance feelings the liquor bottles held in the center of the photograph were removed from some later prints.

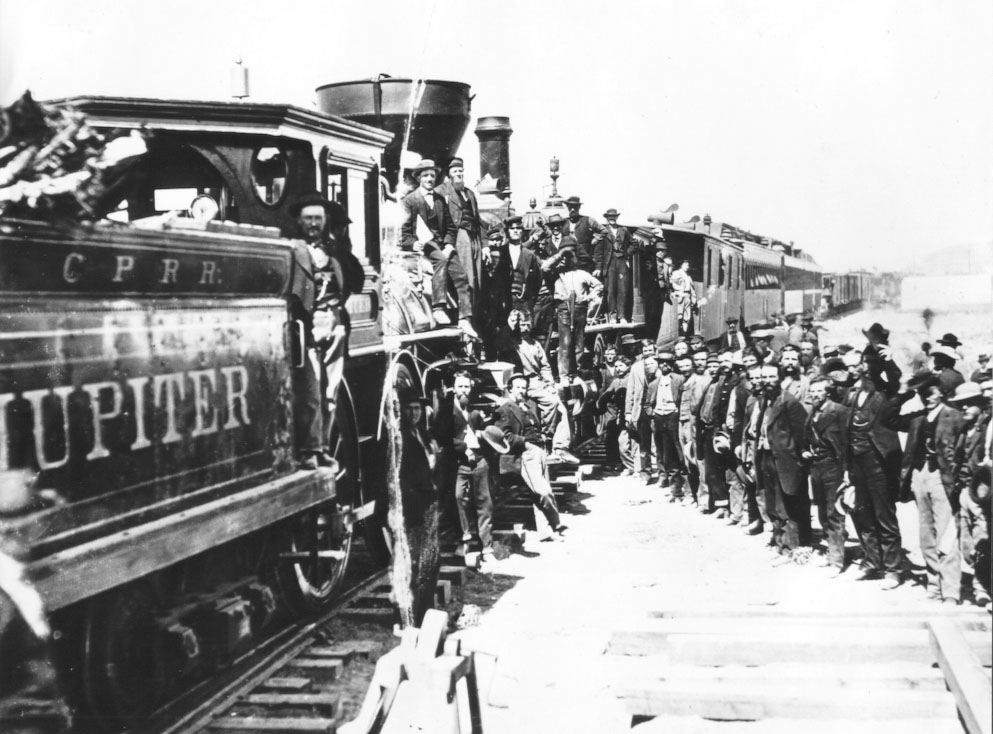
May 10, 1869, Celebration of completion of the Transcontinental Railroad

== Aftermath ==
Although the Promontory event marked the completion of the transcontinental railroad from Omaha to Sacramento on May 10, 1869, it did not mark the completion of the Pacific Railroad "from the Missouri river to the Pacific" authorized by the Pacific Railroad Acts, much less a seamless coast-to-coast rail network: neither Sacramento nor Omaha was a seaport, nor did they have rail connections until after they were designated as the termini. Western Pacific completed the westernmost transcontinental leg from Sacramento to San Francisco Bay on September 6, 1869, with the last spike at the Mossdale bridge across the San Joaquin River near Lathrop, California. The official completion date of the Pacific Railroad as called for by Section 6 of the Pacific Railroad Act of 1862, et seq. was determined to be November 6, 1869, by the U.S. Supreme Court in Part I of the Court Opinion and Order dated January 27, 1879, in re Union Pacific Railroad vs. United States (99 U.S. 402).

Passengers were required to cross the Missouri River between Council Bluffs, Iowa, and Omaha, Nebraska, by boat until the building of the Union Pacific Missouri River Bridge in March 1872. In the meantime, a coast-to-coast rail link was achieved in August 1870 in Strasburg, Colorado, by the completion of the Denver extension of the Kansas Pacific Railway.

In 1904, a new railroad route called the Lucin Cutoff was built by-passing the Promontory location to the south. By going west across the Great Salt Lake from Ogden, Utah, to Lucin, Utah, the new railroad line shortened the distance by 43 miles and avoided curves and grades. Main line trains no longer passed over Promontory Summit.

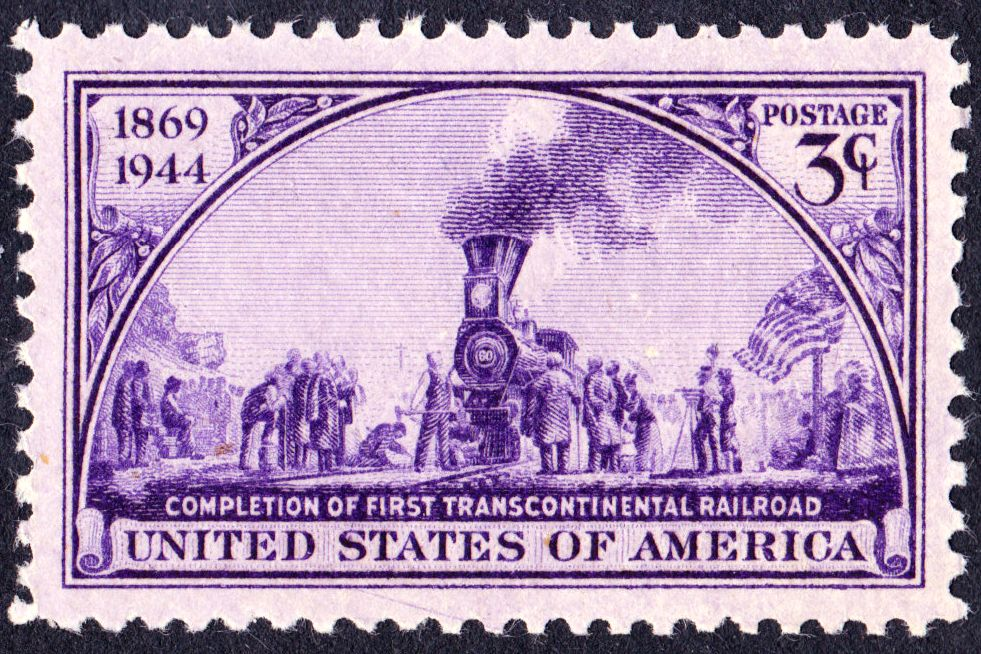
1944 U.S. postage stamp commemorating the 75th anniversary of the completion

In 1942, the old rails over Promontory Summit were salvaged for the war effort; the event was marked by a ceremonial "undriving" of the last iron spike. The original event had been all but forgotten except by local residents, who erected a commemorative marker in 1943. The following year a commemorative postage stamp was issued to mark the 75th anniversary. The years after the war saw a revival of interest in the event; the first re-enactment was staged in 1948.

In 1957, Congress established the Golden Spike National Historic Site to preserve the area around Promontory Summit as closely as possible to its appearance in 1869. O'Connor Engineering Laboratories in Costa Mesa, California, designed and built working replicas of the locomotives present at the original ceremony for the Park Service. These engines are drawn up face-to-face each Saturday during the summer for a re-enactment of the event.

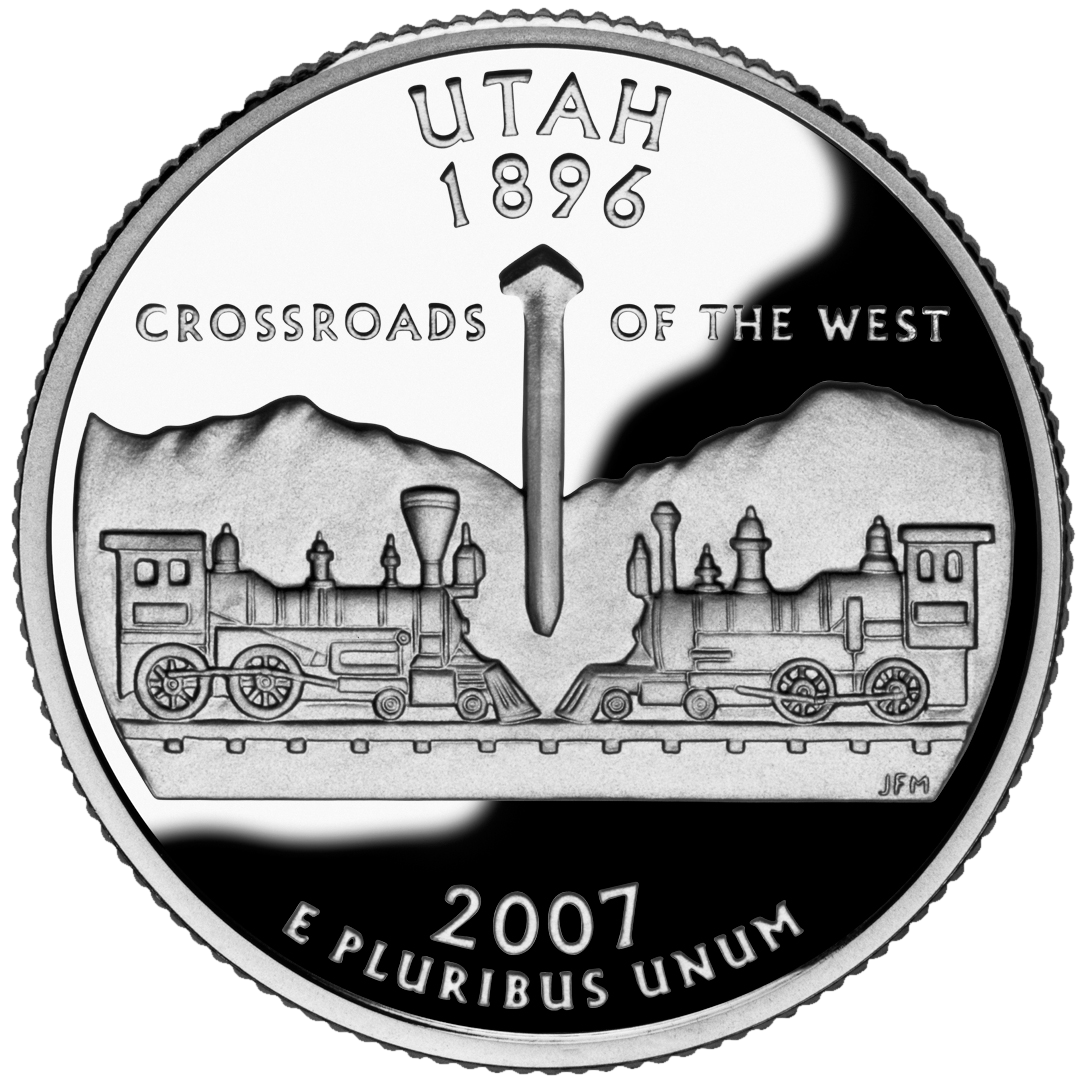
The Utah state quarter

For the May 10, 1969, centennial of the driving of the last spike, the High Iron Company ran a steam-powered excursion train round trip from New York City to Promontory. The Golden Spike Centennial Limited transported more than 100 passengers including, for the last leg into Salt Lake City, actor John Wayne. The Union Pacific Railroad also sent a special display train and the U.S. Army Transportation Corps sent a steam-powered 3-car special from Fort Eustis, Virginia.

On May 10, 2006, on the anniversary of the driving of the spike, Utah announced that its state quarter design would be a depiction of the driving of the spike. The Golden Spike design was selected as the winner from among several others by Utah's governor, Jon Huntsman Jr., following a period during which Utah residents voted and commented on their favorite of three finalists.

On May 10, 2019, the United States Postal Service issued a set of three new commemorative postage stamps to mark the 150th anniversary of the driving of the golden spike: one stamp for the Jupiter locomotive, one stamp for locomotive #119, and one stamp for the golden spike.

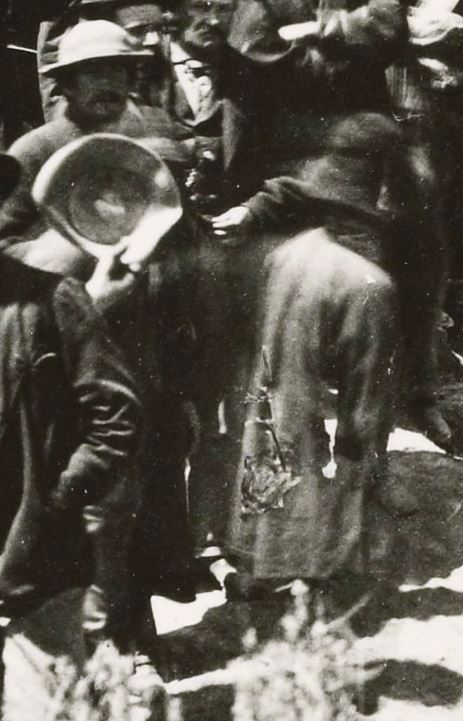
Stanford University has identified the two men shown in this detail of the Andrew J. Russell "handshake" photograph at the Golden Spike ceremony as Chinese workers.

It remains a common misconception that Chinese workers are not visible in the famous Andrew J. Russell "champagne photograph" of the last spike ceremony. Many Chinese workers were absent from the Golden Spike ceremony in 1869 despite their tremendous contribution in the completion of the railroad. More than 12,000 Chinese had labored to build the rail line from the west, 80% of the railroad workers were Chinese.

On the 145th anniversary of the Golden Spike ceremony, Corky Lee gathered more than 200 Chinese, Chinese Americans and other Asian Pacific American groups to create what he called "photographic justice".

Research conducted by the Stanford University "Chinese Railroad Workers in North America Project" disproved this idea, identifying two Chinese laborers who were photographed in the famous Andrew J. Russell photograph. More Chinese laborers who attended the last spike ceremony are visible in Russell's "stereo view # 539 Chinese at Laying Last Rail UPRR", although the Chinese laborers who attended the ceremony only represented a small fraction of the total Chinese workforce on the railroad.

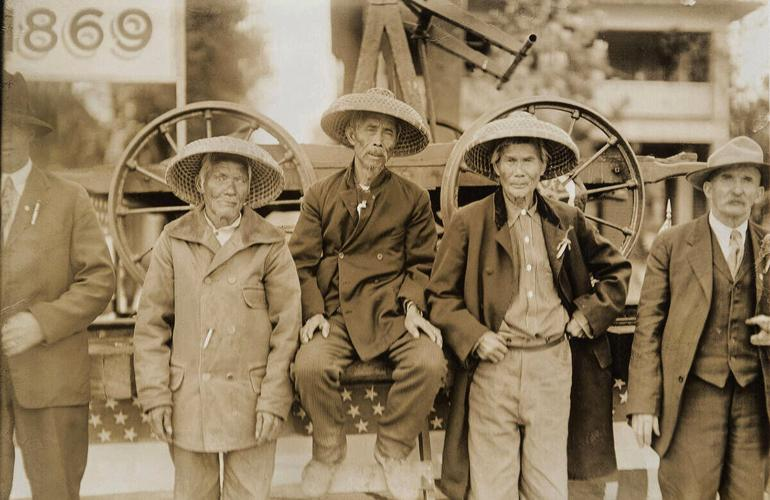
Original workers from the project, Wong Fook, Lee Chao, and Ging Cui are shown in front of a parade float in Ogden, Utah, during a 1919 parade to celebrate the 50th anniversary of the completion of the Transcontinental Railroad.

Three of the Chinese workers who helped build the railroad in 1869, Wong Fook, Lee Chao, and Ging Cui were given a place in the celebratory 50th anniversary parade at Ogden, Utah, in 1919. However, during the 1969 ceremony no Chinese representatives spoke during the dedication of a plaque memorializing Chinese railroad workers. The 2019 ceremony brought an intentionally greater focus on the Chinese contribution with then United States Secretary of Transportation Elaine Chao speaking at the event. The Chinese Railway Workers Descendants Association continues to hold annual gatherings at Chinese Arch near Promontory. A monument dedicated to Chinese workers on the railroad was installed at the Utah State capitol building to correspond with the 155th anniversary.

A Utah state park, planned to celebrate the Golden Spike opening in Brigham City, Utah in 2025, will feature a 43 feet tall statue depicting the Golden Spike. The statue, mounted on the back of a truck; has toured various parts of America throughout 2023 and 2024.

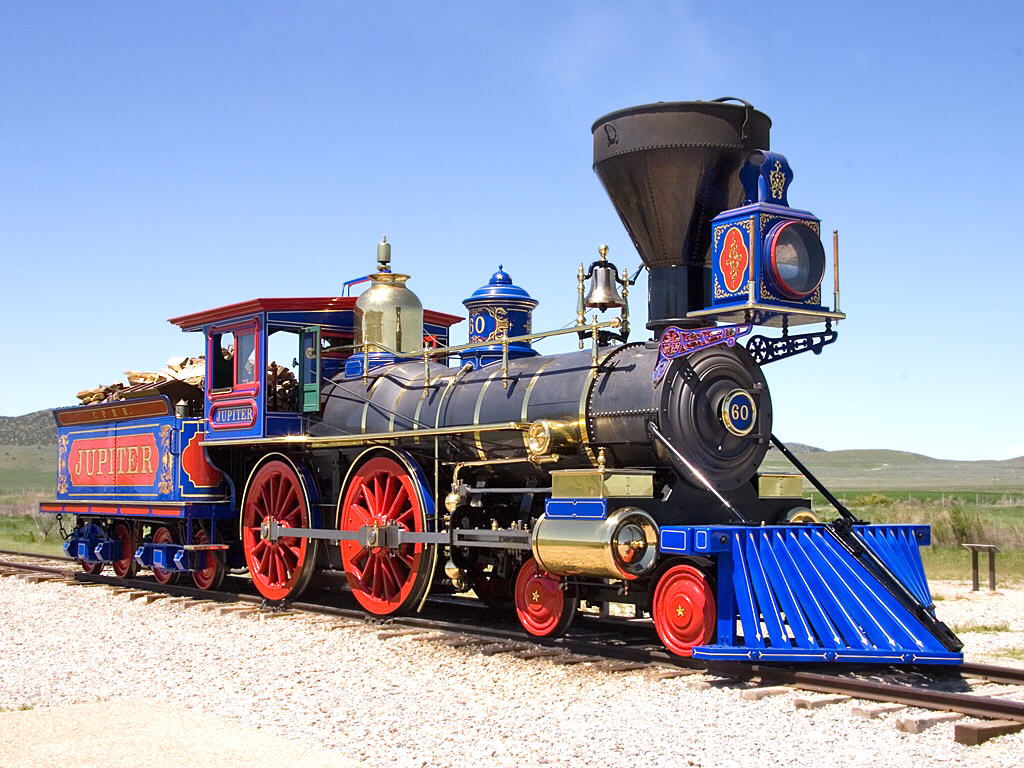
A replica of the Jupiter (CP# 60) at the Golden Spike National Historic Site

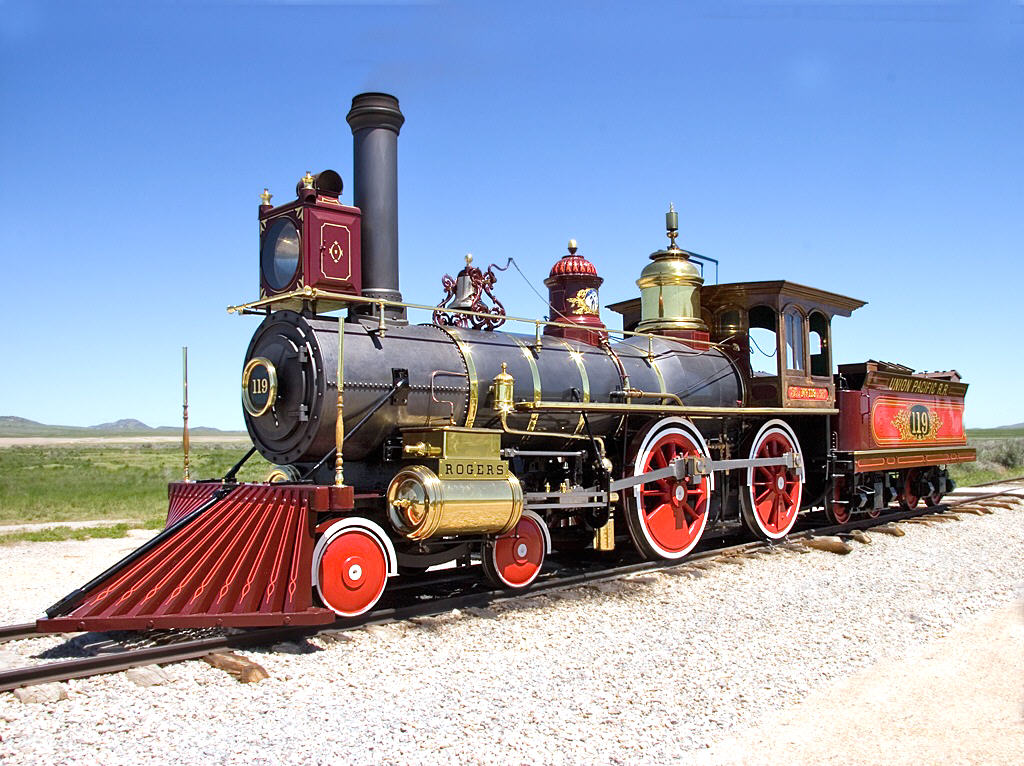
A replica of UP# 119 at Golden Spike National Historic Site

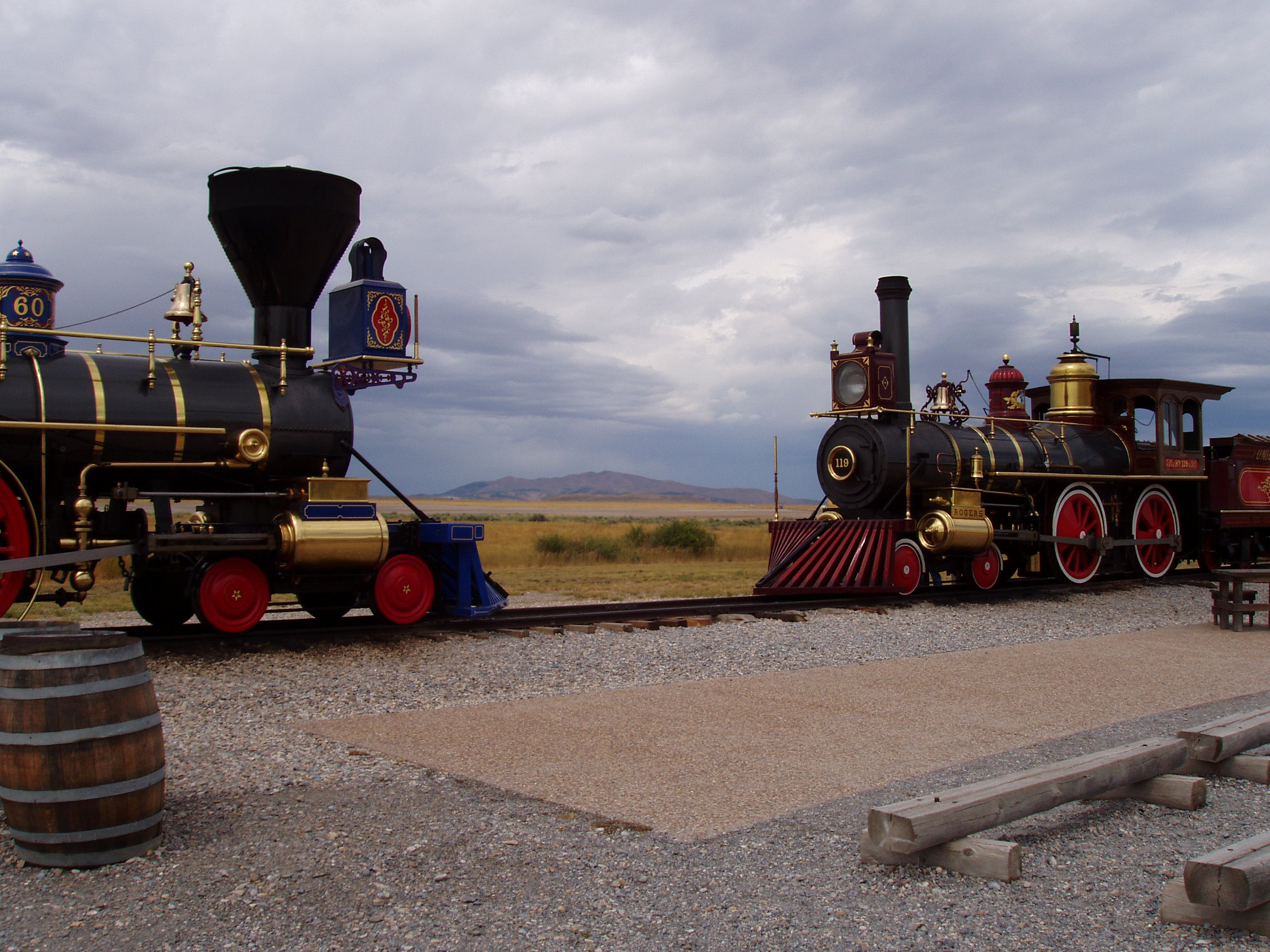
The current site of the Golden Spike National Historic Site, with replicas of No. 119 and the Jupiter facing each other to re-enact the driving of the Golden Spike

== Golden Spike Days Celebration (1939) ==
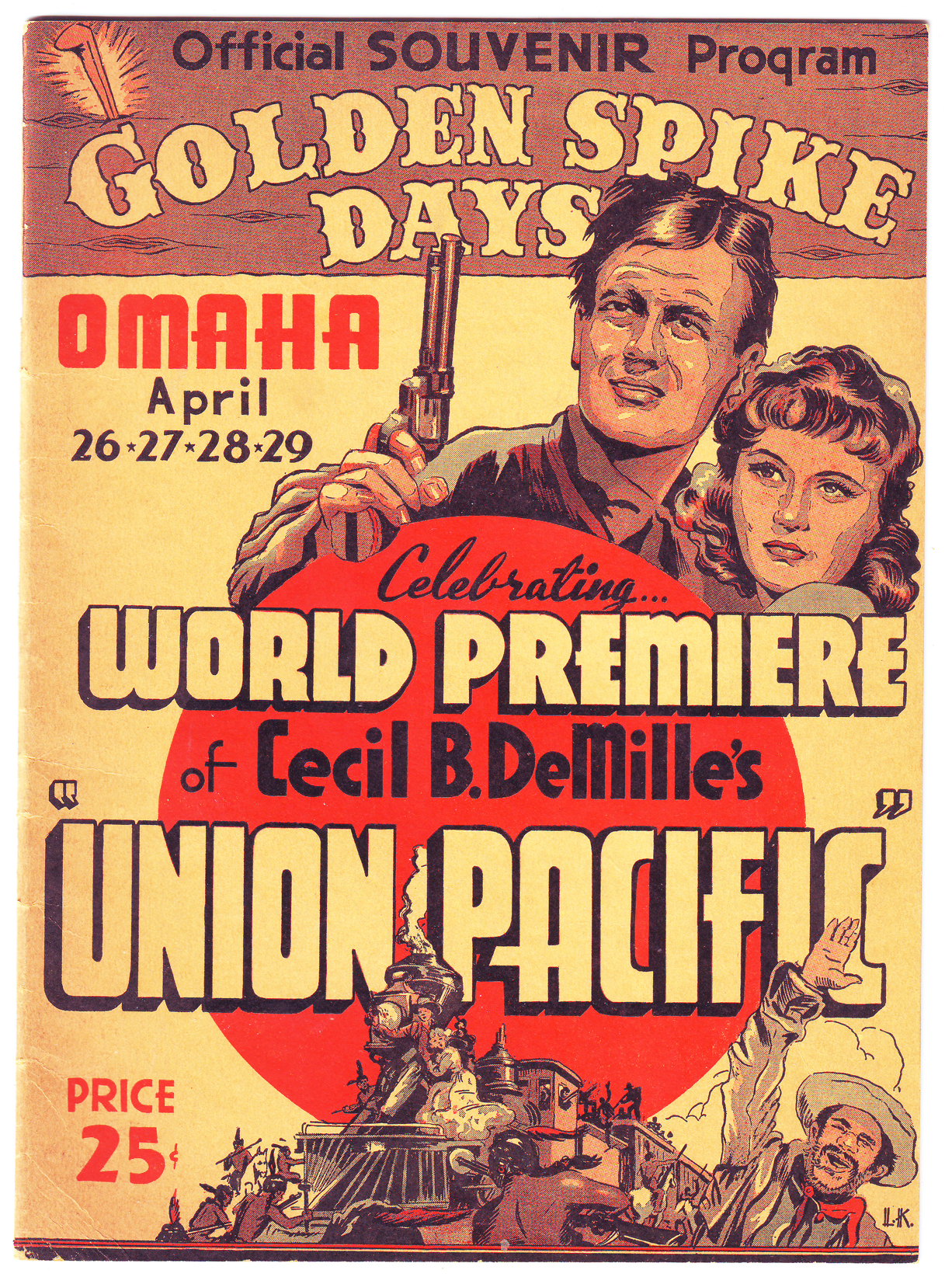
Golden Spike Days program, Omaha, 1939

An elaborate four-day event called the Golden Spike Days Celebration was held in Omaha, Nebraska, from April 26 to 29, 1939, to commemorate the 70th anniversary of the joining of the UP and CPRR rails and driving of the Last Spike at Promontory Summit, Utah, in 1869. The centerpiece event of the celebration occurred on April 28 with the world premiere of the Cecil B. DeMille feature motion picture Union Pacific that took place simultaneously in the city's Omaha, Orpheum, and Paramount theaters. The film features an elaborate reenactment of the original Golden Spike ceremony (filmed in Canoga Park, California) as the closing scene of the motion picture, for which DeMille borrowed the actual Golden Spike from Stanford University to be held by Dr. W. H. Harkness (Stanley Andrews) as he delivered his remarks prior to its driving to complete the railroad. (A prop spike was used for the hammering sequence.)

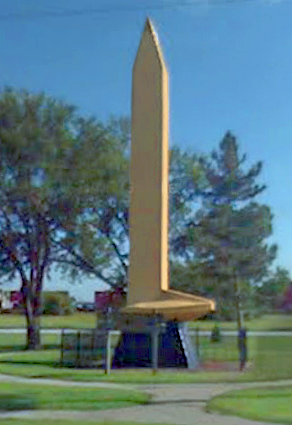
The Golden Spike Monument, Council Bluffs, Iowa, 1939

Also included as a part of the overall celebration's major attractions was the Golden Spike Historical Exposition, a large assemblage of artifacts (including the Golden Spike), tools, equipment, photographs, documents, and other materials from the construction of the Pacific Railroad that were put on display at Omaha's Municipal Auditorium. The four days of events drew more than 250,000 people to Omaha during its run, a number roughly equivalent to the city's then population. The celebration was opened by President Franklin D. Roosevelt who inaugurated it by pressing a telegraph key at the White House in Washington, D.C.

On the same day as the premiere of the movie, a gold-colored concrete spike called the "Golden Spike Monument", measuring some 56 feet (17 m) in height, was unveiled at 21st Street and 9th Avenue in Council Bluffs, Iowa, adjacent to the UP's main yard, the location of milepost 0.0 of that road's portion of the Pacific Railroad. The concrete spike remains on display at the site.

== In popular culture ==
=== Music ===
In 2010, the band Railroad Earth released a song called The Jupiter & the 119. The song references building the railroad and mentions that "they nailed the golden spike".

=== Artwork ===
- In 2012, artist Greg Stimac used the original "golden spike", on display at the Cantor Arts Center at Stanford University, to produce a series of photograms, or cameraless photographs.

=== Films ===
- The first motion picture depiction of the driving of the golden spike occurred in The Iron Horse (1924), a silent film directed by John Ford and produced by Fox Film. In 2011, this film was deemed "culturally, historically, or aesthetically significant" by the United States Library of Congress and selected for preservation in the National Film Registry.
- In the fictional action comedy film Wild Wild West (1999), the joining ceremony is the setting of an assassination attempt on then U.S. President Ulysses S. Grant by the film's antagonist Dr. Arliss Loveless. (In reality Grant did not attend the Golden Spike ceremony.) The extensive Promontory Summit set for the film's Golden Spike ceremony scenes was built at the 20,000-acre Cook's Ranch near Santa Fe, New Mexico.
- In the Western action film The Lone Ranger (2013), the joining of two railroads was commenced by the film's antagonist, Latham Cole. However, it was interrupted by the start of a chase. Doubling for Union Pacific #119 was a scratch-built locomotive, Constitution (a locomotive based on Illinois Central 382 that Casey Jones drove on his final trip on April 30, 1900).

=== Television ===
- The Batman: The Animated Series episode "Showdown" features an extended flashback taking place in the Utah Territory in 1883, with the territorial governor (voiced by Patrick Leahy) presiding over the ceremony to drive home the Golden Spike, before they are interrupted by an aerial attack by Ra's al Ghul. In reality, 1883 was the year in which the southern section of the Southern Pacific railroad (the second transcontinental line) was completed; the completion ceremony took place in Texas rather than Utah, and the ceremonial spikes driven were silver, not gold.
- Hell on Wheels presents a multi-season arc on the construction of the transcontinental railroad. In Season 5, Episode 11, a flash forward sequence includes a picture of the railroad ceremony and a main character claiming to possess a ring made of gold crafted from part of the ceremonial golden spike.
- In Syfy original series Warehouse 13, the golden spike is featured as an artifact that was used by Pete & Myka to temporarily negate the effects of the Rhodes Bowl. Later, the spike is depicted as stuck within the Warehouse expansion joints as it expanded to accommodate additional artifacts.

=== Trains ===
- The Inyo, a 4-4-0 steam locomotive built for the Virginia & Truckee Railroad (V&T #22) in 1875 by the Baldwin Locomotive Works in Philadelphia, appeared in both the Golden Spike ceremony scene in Union Pacific (1939) and in the 1960s television series The Wild Wild West. It appears briefly as the Jupiter in Go West. In May 1969, the Inyo participated in the Golden Spike Centennial at Promontory, Utah, and then served for ten years as the replica of the Central Pacific's Jupiter (CPRR #60) at the Golden Spike National Historical Site, until the current replica was built in 1979. Purchased by the Nevada State Railroad Museum in Carson City, Nevada, in 1974, it was eventually brought back to Nevada and fully restored there in 1983, where it remains operational.

== See also ==
- Cornerstone
- Last Spike (Canadian Pacific Railway)
- Last Spike Monument (New Zealand)
- List of heritage railroads in the United States
