= Toano, Nevada =

- Ghost Town
- Location within the state of Nevada Toano, Nevada (the United States)
- Coordinates: 41°07′54″N 114°25′23″W
- Country: United States
- State: Nevada
- County: Elko
- Elevation: 5,962 ft (1,817 m)
- Time zone: UTC-8 (Pacific (PST))
  - Summer (DST): UTC-7 (PDT)
- GNIS feature ID: 858215

Toano is a ghost town in Elko County, Nevada, in the United States.

== History ==
Toano was created by the Central Pacific Railroad in 1868. A post office was in operation at Toano from 1869 until 1906. The town was the western terminus of the Salt Lake Division of the railroad. In 1870, Toano had a population of 117, including hotels and stores. Between 1873 and 1874, the town was plagued by two fires that destroyed several buildings and a hotel. The start of the end of the town was in 1884, when the Oregon Short Line Railroad was completed and all traffic from Idaho was eliminated leading to the town quickly losing its importance. Toano officially became a ghost town in 1906. No early buildings still stand.

== See also ==
- Toano Range
