= Union Pacific 119 =

American locomotive at the Golden Spike ceremony

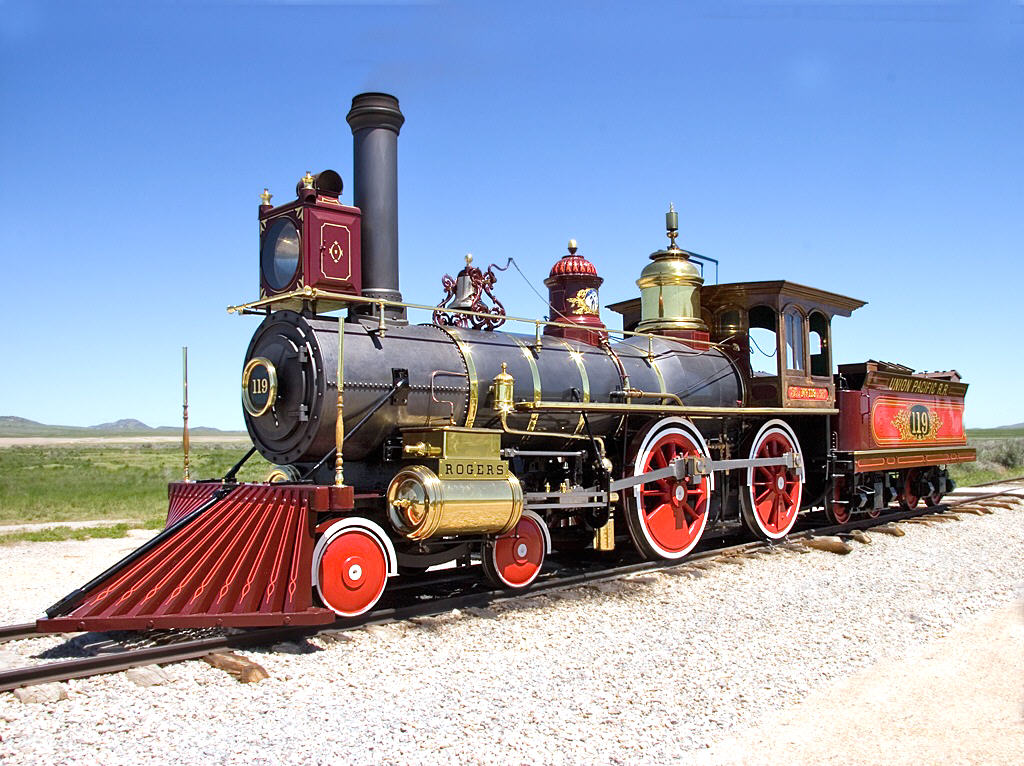
- No. 119 replica at Golden Spike National Historical Park
Type and origin
- Power type: Steam
- Builder: Rogers Locomotive and Machine Works (original); O'Connor Engineering Laboratories (replica)
- Serial number: 1558
- Build date: November 19, 1868 (original); 1979 (replica)
Specifications
- Configuration
  - Whyte: 4-4-0
- Gauge: 4 ft 8 1/2 in (1,435 mm) standard gauge
- Driver dia.: 4 ft 6 in (1,372 mm)
- Frame type: Bar
- Loco weight: 27 short tons (24 long tons; 24 t)
- Fuel type: Coal
- Cylinders: Two, outside
- Cylinder size: 16 in (406 mm) diameter × 24 in (610 mm) stroke
Career
- Operators: Union Pacific Railroad
- Numbers: 119, renum 343 in 1882
- Current owner: Golden Spike N.H.P.
- Disposition: Original scrapped in 1903, replica operational at the Golden Spike N.H.P.

Union Pacific 119 is a 4-4-0 "American" type steam locomotive made famous for meeting the Central Pacific Railroad's Jupiter at Promontory Summit, Utah, during the Golden Spike ceremony commemorating the completion of the first transcontinental railroad in 1869. The locomotive was built for the Union Pacific Railroad by Rogers Locomotive and Machine Works of Paterson, New Jersey, in 1868, along with numbers 116, 117, 118 and 120. The original was scrapped in 1903, but a replica now operates at the Golden Spike National Historical Park.

== Promontory Summit ==
No. 119 was assigned to the Union Pacific Railroad's Utah Division, carrying trains between Rawlins, Wyoming, and Ogden, Utah, and was stationed in the latter when a call for a replacement engine came from vice-president Thomas C. Durant, to take him to Promontory Ridge, Utah Territory, for the Golden Spike ceremony celebrating the completion of the Transcontinental Railroad. While enroute to the ceremony, a swollen river had washed away some supports to the Devil's Gate Bridge. Durant's engineer refused to take his engine across, consenting only to nudging the lighter passenger cars over the span. It held, but this left Durant and his entourage without an engine. No. 119 was sent from Ogden to take them the short distance to Promontory, where it was memorialized in photos and history faced nose to nose with the Central Pacific's Jupiter.

In Andrew J. Russell's famous photograph of the Meeting of the Lines, No. 119 is seen on the right with its engineer, Sam Bradford, leaning off the cowcatcher holding a bottle of champagne up to Jupiter engineer George Booth. Bradford and Booth would later break a bottle of champagne over the other's locomotive in celebration.

== Later career ==
After the Golden Spike run, No. 119 led a similar life to Jupiter, and returned to service as a freight locomotive. In 1882, 119 was renumbered to 343, and was scrapped in 1903.

== Replicas ==
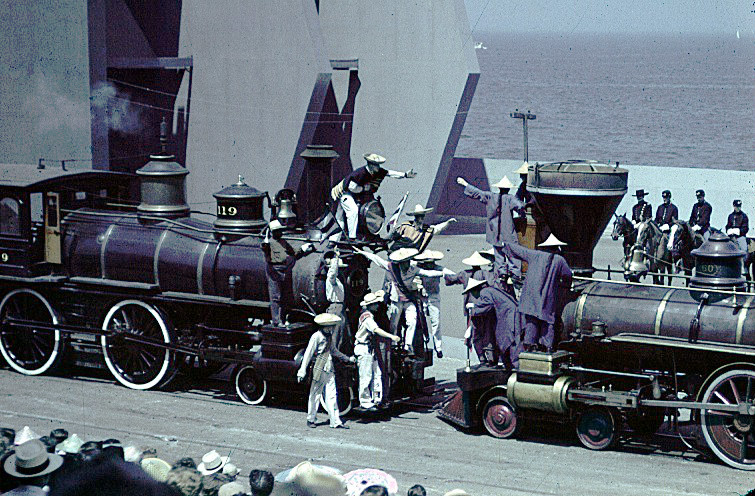
The Chicago, Burlington, and Quincy Railroad's locomotive no. 35 dressed up as a stand-in for Union Pacific 119 in a Golden Spike reenactment at the 1949 Chicago Railroad Fair

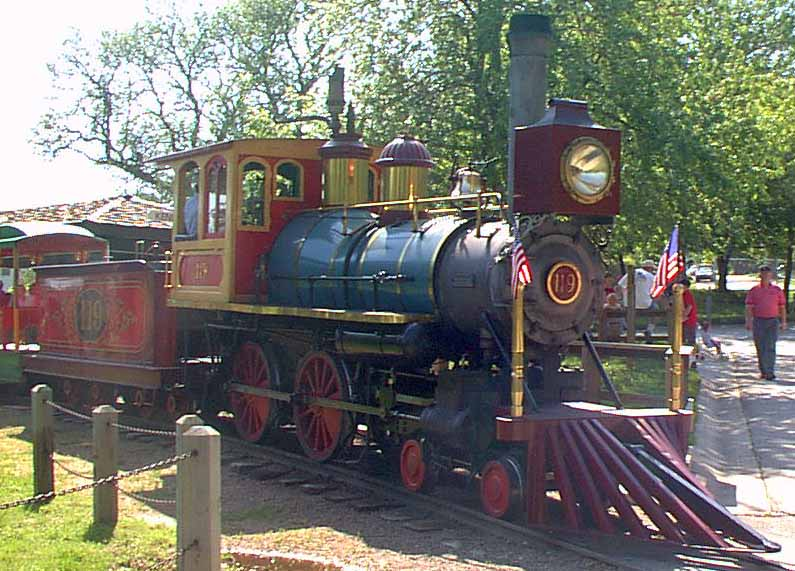
The Omaha Zoo Railroad's replica of no. 119

As was the case with the Jupiter, the Union Pacific only began to acknowledge the 119's historical significance well after it was scrapped. For a 1949 reenactment of the Golden Spike ceremony staged at the Chicago Railroad Fair the Chicago, Burlington, and Quincy Railroad's locomotive number 35 was cosmetically altered stand-in for the 119; with Virginia and Truckee's Genoa portraying the Jupiter.

In 1968, the Union Pacific sponsored the construction of the Omaha Zoo Railroad in the Henry Doorly Zoo, including a narrow gauge replica of the 119, built by Crown Metal Products.

In the mid 1960's, with the upcoming centennial of the Golden Spike ceremony, the National Park Service embarked on a project to reproduce the Union Pacific No. 119 and Central Pacific Jupiter exactly as they appeared in 1869, to have them exhibited on a section of restored trackage at the recently established Golden Spike National Historic Site at Promontory Summit. The park service commissioned Roy E. Appleman to provide recommendations for the best way to replicate the engines. Appleman's conclusion, based on research provided by noted railroad historian and steam engine owner Gerald M. Best, among others in the field, was that there were no preserved examples of engines close enough to their design to properly represent them, and the best option was to construct replicas of the locomotives entirely from scratch.

With mainline steam locomotives no longer being produced by any US-based locomotive builders and limited research information available, it would not be possible to construct the replicas in time for the 1969 centennial, so the park service rented the Virginia and Truckee engines Reno and Genoa from MGM Studios and the Pacific Coast Chapter of the Railway and Locomotive Historical Society, respectively, and had the Reno dressed as the 119, and Genoa dressed as the Jupiter. These engines were displayed on a section of restored trackage on May 10, 1969, and remained on display until the following year, when the Reno was sold and moved to Old Tucson Studios and the Genoa was sold to state of California, joining the rest of the former Pacific Coast Chapter RLHS-owned equipment in Sacramento in what ultimately became the California State Railroad Museum.

Beginning on March 4, 1969, the Union Pacific operated a Golden Spike Centennial Exposition train, which embarked on a tour of their network beginning in East Los Angeles and concluding in Omaha on October 12 of that year. This train consisted of flatcars displaying the Virginia and Truckee's Inyo and Dayton on loan from Paramount Pictures and dressed up as the Jupiter and 119, respectively, along with pieces of vintage railroad construction rolling stock, and a chair car containing photos, models, and other displays relating to the transcontinental railroad. After the Reno and Genoa were sold in 1970, the Inyo and Dayton replaced them at the Golden Spike National Historic Site.

To construct full size replicas of the Jupiter and 119, the National Park Service initially approached Walt Disney Studios, which had previously built two steam engines from scratch for their Disneyland park's railroad, for the project. Disney declined, but recommended the O'Connor Engineering Laboratories in Costa Mesa, California, who had designed many unique pieces of filming equipment used by the company, for the task. Since none of the original drawings of either engine survived, over 700 detailed engineering drawings had to be recreated based entirely on the photographs taken of the engines during the ceremony, as well as research on the construction of similar locomotives during the mid 19th century. Disney animator and steam engine owner Ward Kimball did color matching and original artwork for the Jupiter and No. 119. In 1974, the Inyo and Dayton were sold by Paramount to the state of Nevada, and were moved to Carson City in 1978, to become part of what would become the Nevada State Railroad Museum, and the completed replicas were delivered to Promontory the following year. No. 119 and Jupiter's paint schemes were updated in 1994, replacing Kimball's color choices with new hues based on a recently uncovered newspaper report vaguely describing the Jupiter's livery, along with further research on locomotive liveries of the late 1860's and early 1870's.

The Kloke Locomotive Works constructed a replica of a typical 1860's vintage Rogers-built 4-4-0 in 2013 for the Northern Central Railway of York, which was painted and lettered as Northern Central Railway locomotive no. 17, "York". This locomotive was constructed following O'Connor Engineering Laboratories' plans for the UP 119 and shares most of the 119's proportions and specifications, although it was built to resemble a wood burning locomotive. As such, the York does not have the smokebox extension, and features a balloon stack of the Jupiter's design. It also deviates further from both the Jupiter and 119 by having a cowcatcher with horizontal slats.

== See also ==
- Jupiter locomotive
- Leviathan locomotive
- List of heritage railroads in the United States
