= Virginia and Truckee 12 Genoa =

Steam locomotive

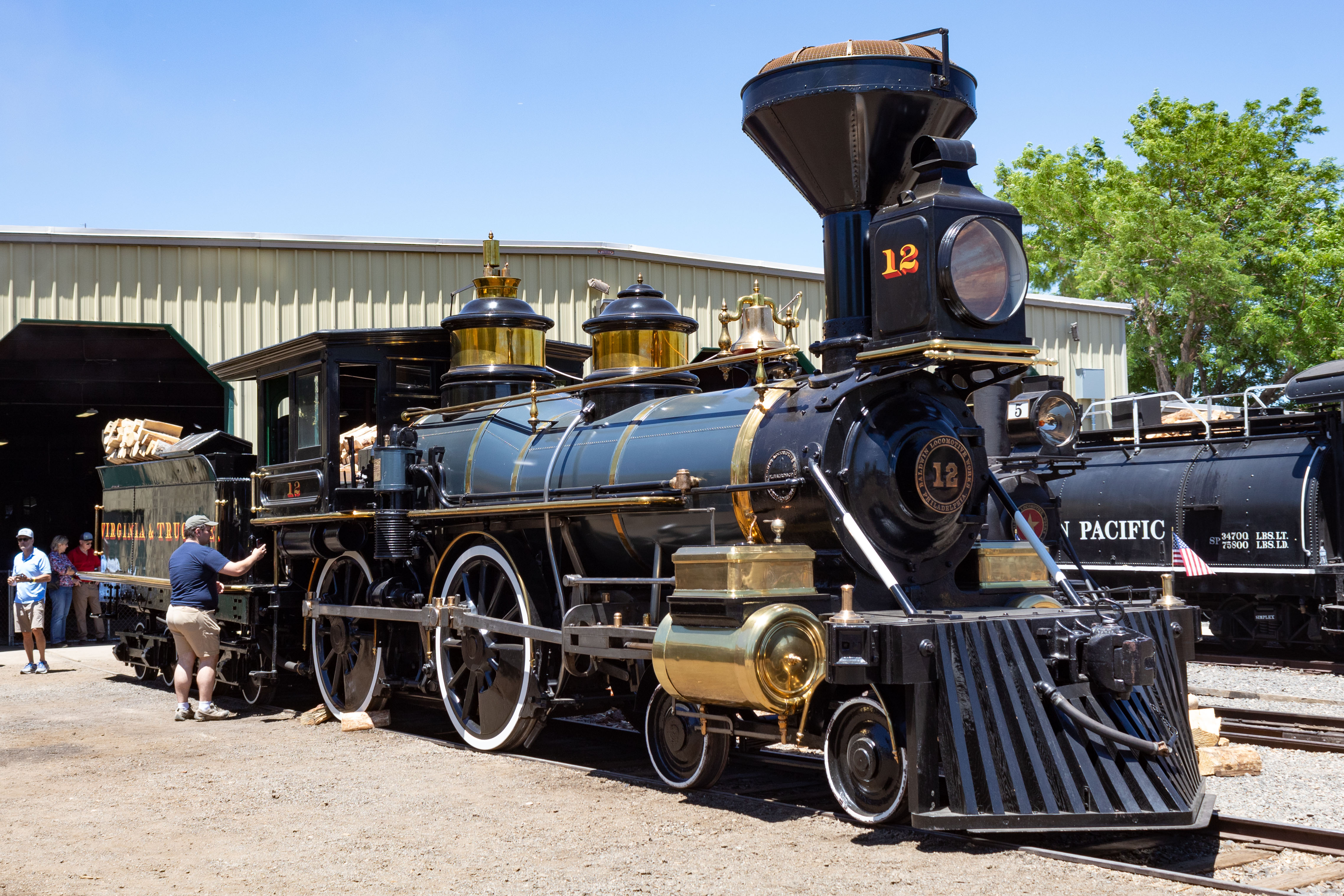
Type and origin
- Power type: Steam
- Serial number: 3090
- Build date: January 1873
Specifications
- Configuration
  - Whyte: 4-4-0
- Gauge: 4 ft 8 1/2 in (1,435 mm)
- Adhesive weight: 45,000 lb (20,000 kg)
- Fuel type: Wood
- Boiler pressure: 130 psi
- Cylinders: Two, outside
- Valve gear: Stephenson
- Valve type: Side valve
- Loco brake: Air
- Train brakes: Air
- Couplers: New: Link-and-pin; Now: Knuckle
Performance figures
- Tractive effort: 11,920 lb (5,410 kg)
Career
- Operators: Virginia and Truckee Railroad
- Class: 27 1/2 D
- Numbers: VT 12
- Official name: Genoa
- Retired: 1908 (revenue service); May 1979 (excursion service)
- Restored: 1938 (1st excursion service)
- Current owner: California State Railroad Museum
- Disposition: On static display

Virginia and Truckee Railroad 12, nicknamed Genoa, is a 4-4-0 "American" type steam locomotive built by the Baldwin Locomotive Works (BLW) in January 1873 for the Virginia and Truckee Railroad (VT). it is one of three largely identical 4-4-0 locomotives built by Baldwin for the railroad, the others being the Reno and the Inyo, and one of four V&T 4-4-0's preserved (the aforementioned three and the Dayton).

== 1873-1902 ==
Upon receiving the "Reno" from Baldwin in May of 1872, Virginia & Truckee General Manager H.M. Yerignton got his bosses at the Bank of California to agree to purchase an identical sister of their 1872 prize as insurance against the inevitable days when the Reno would be out of service.

The Genoa was received by the V&T in 1873 and was immediately put into work hauling passenger trains between Virginia City, Carson City, and Reno where the V&T interchanged with the Central/Southern Pacific. Her early days would see her in service about once a week handling everything from locals, mixed trains, picnic specials, to the Lightning Express. Like her sisters, the Genoa would be upgraded with Miller platform couplers and Westinghouse Straight Air by 1880. During the 1880's and 1890's, the Genoa would be the primary engine for secondary passenger services or as the main backup to the Reno

== 1902-1938 ==
The Genoa would be rebuilt and modernized by the V&T with Tower Knuckle Couplers & Westinghouse Automatic Air as per the ICC regulations. The Genoa would re-enter traffic in 1902 and cover for the Reno & Inyo as they were upgraded and rebuilt. By 1908, the V&T would retire her from the roster and store her in the Carson City Enginehouse. Her last known fire-up was in 1912 when the V&T examined the possibility of using her to replace the Reno or Inyo in regular service. This would not come to pass but instead see the Genoa be used as a ready parts source for her sisters.

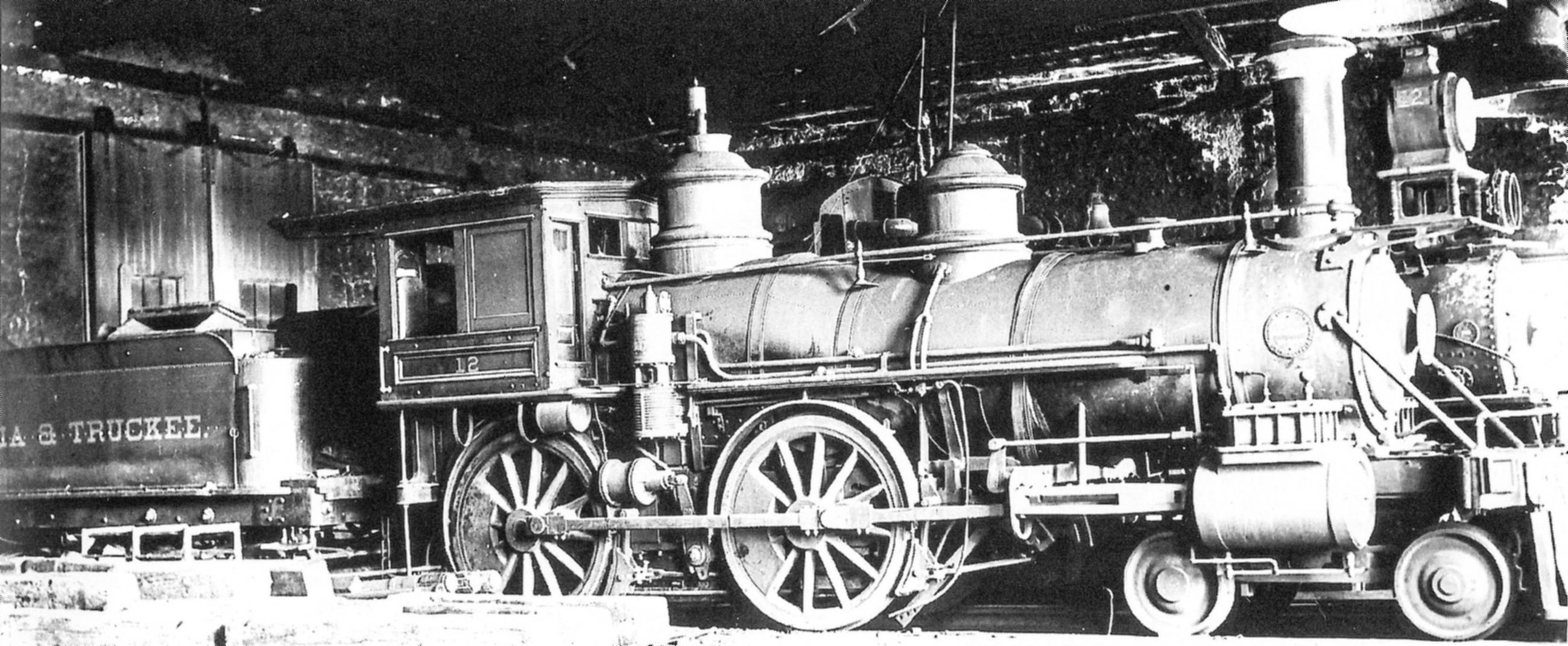
#12 in storage at the V&T's Carson CIty Enginehouse after retirement.

== Preservation ==
In 1938 it was sold to Eastern Railroads President's Committee in New York. It was restored to look like Central Pacific #60 Jupiter for the 1939 New York World's Fair. In 1940 it was presented to the Pacific Coast Chapter of the Railway and Locomotive Historical Society and shipped to the Western Pacific Roundhouse in Oakland, California. The engine went to the 1948 Chicago's Railroad fair where it once again appeared as Jupiter. In 1955, it operated on the Stockton Terminal & Eastern Railroad. In 1957 Genoa made a trip to San Francisco. In 1969 it appeared as Jupiter at the Gold Spike Centennial at Promontory, Utah, opposite its sister locomotive #11 Reno dressed as Union Pacific 119. That year, it was donated to the state of California and was moved to Sacramento the following year.

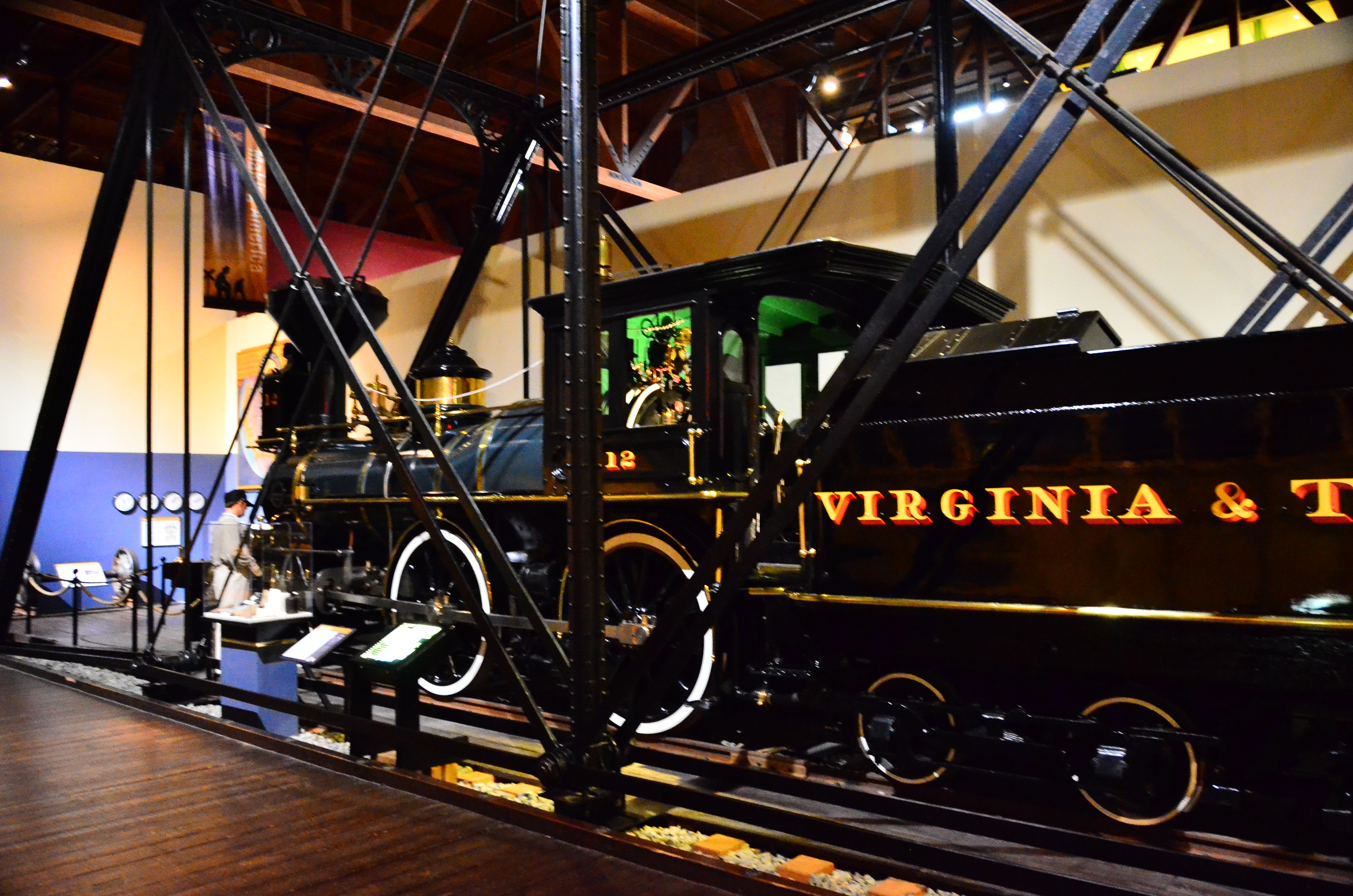
The Genoa in its display in Sacramento

== Static display ==
After its last wood-fired operation under steam in May 1979, #12 was restored to its 1902 appearance. The restored locomotive then became part of the California State Railroad Museum's collection. It is displayed alongside a V&T coach, number 16. On a display of an example of a bridge from the late 19th century. In 2022, The Genoa was temporarily traded to the Nevada State Railroad Museum in Carson City, Nevada, for two years, in exchange for their #18 The Dayton, which was built in the Central Pacific Railroad shops in Sacramento.
