= Inyo =

Inyo may refer to:

== Places ==
=== California ===
- Inyo County, California
- Inyo National Forest, USA
- The Inyo Mountains
- The Mono–Inyo Craters

== Other uses ==
- Japanese for yin and yang
- A bee fly genus Inyo
- Virginia and Truckee 22 Inyo, a steam locomotive from the Virginia and Truckee Railroad
