= Washington Park and Zoo Railway =

Railway in Portland, Oregon, U.S.

Washington Park & Zoo Railway
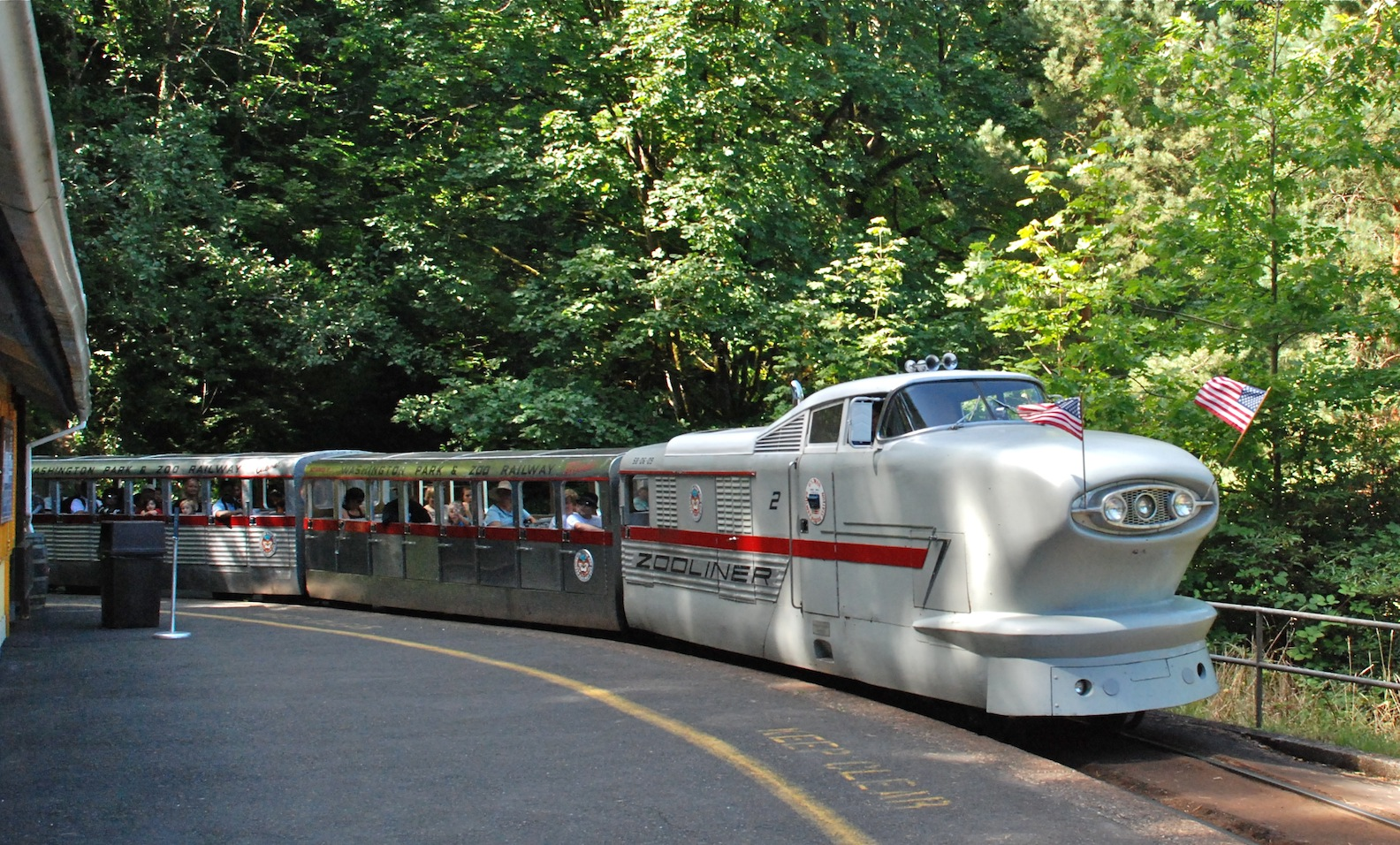
- The Zooliner, shown arriving at Washington Park station, is one of the railway's two primary trains.

Overview
- Owner: City of Portland, leased to Metro (Oregon regional government)
- Locale: Portland, Oregon

Service
- Ridership: Approx. 350,000 annually

History
- Opened: June 7, 1958 (officially June 9)

Technical
- Track gauge: 2 ft 6 in (762 mm)
- Portland Zoo Railway Historic District
- U.S. National Register of Historic Places
- U.S. Historic district
- Location: Portland, Oregon
- NRHP reference No.: 100005018
- Added to NRHP: March 5, 2020
Route map (1960–2013)
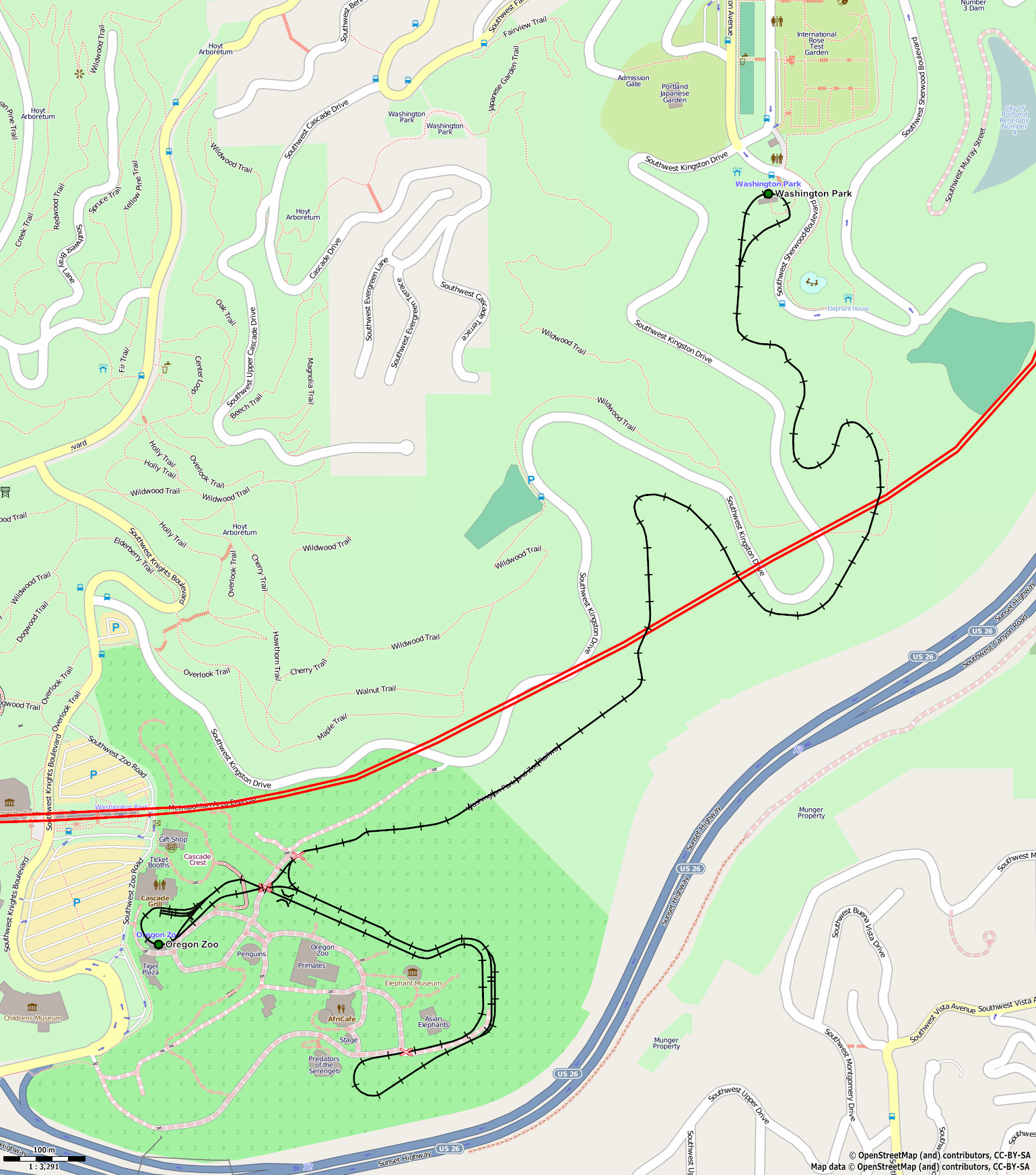

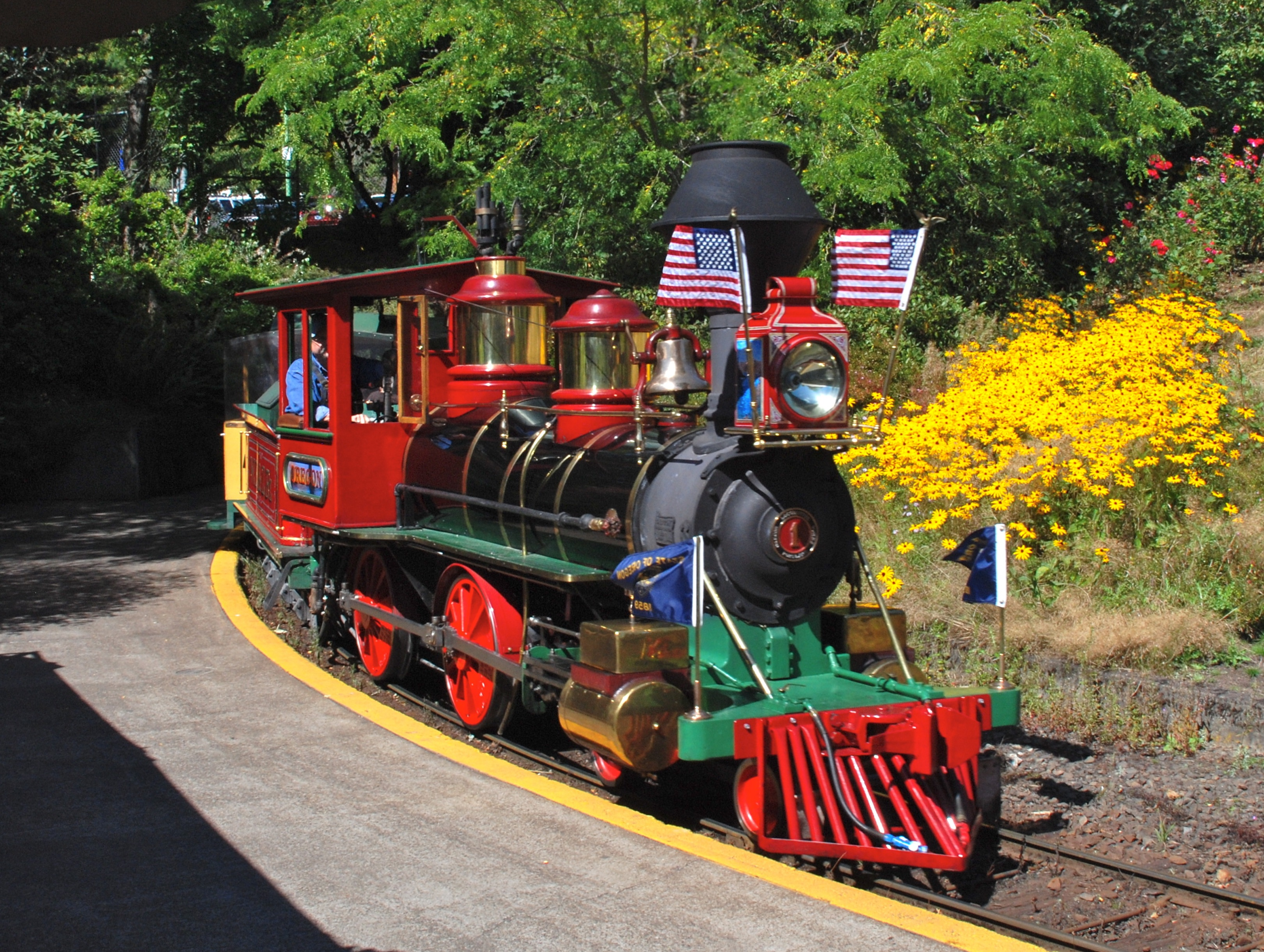
The No. 1 Oregon in 2010. Built in 1959, this locomotive is a scaled-down version of Virginia & Truckee Railroad #11, the "Reno". The steam train operates on a limited number of dates each year.

The Washington Park & Zoo Railway (WP&ZRy) is a 2 ft 6 in (762 mm) narrow gauge recreational railroad in Portland, Oregon's Washington Park with rolling stock built to 5/8 scale. Opened in three stages in 1958, 1959 and 1960, it previously provided transportation between the Oregon Zoo, Hoyt Arboretum, International Rose Test Garden, and the World Forestry Center. The extended line through Washington Park, now out of service but still in place, was about 2 miles (3.2 km) long. The service is currently operating on a 1/2-mile (0.80 km) loop completely within the Oregon Zoo grounds. As of around 2012, the railway was carrying about 350,000 passengers per year.

The railroad is operational year-round when the Oregon Zoo is open, except in January and part of February, when it is closed for required maintenance. Special events occur during the winter holidays. A separate ticket is needed to ride the 6-minute internal loop within the zoo grounds, but zoo admission was also required.

In 2013, a temporary closure was necessitated by the construction of the zoo's new Elephant Lands exhibit, which will also include remodeling of other parts of the zoo grounds. A new section of track was laid to replace the short loop. After construction the train operations began running on the new Zoo Loop line within the Oregon Zoo.

== History ==
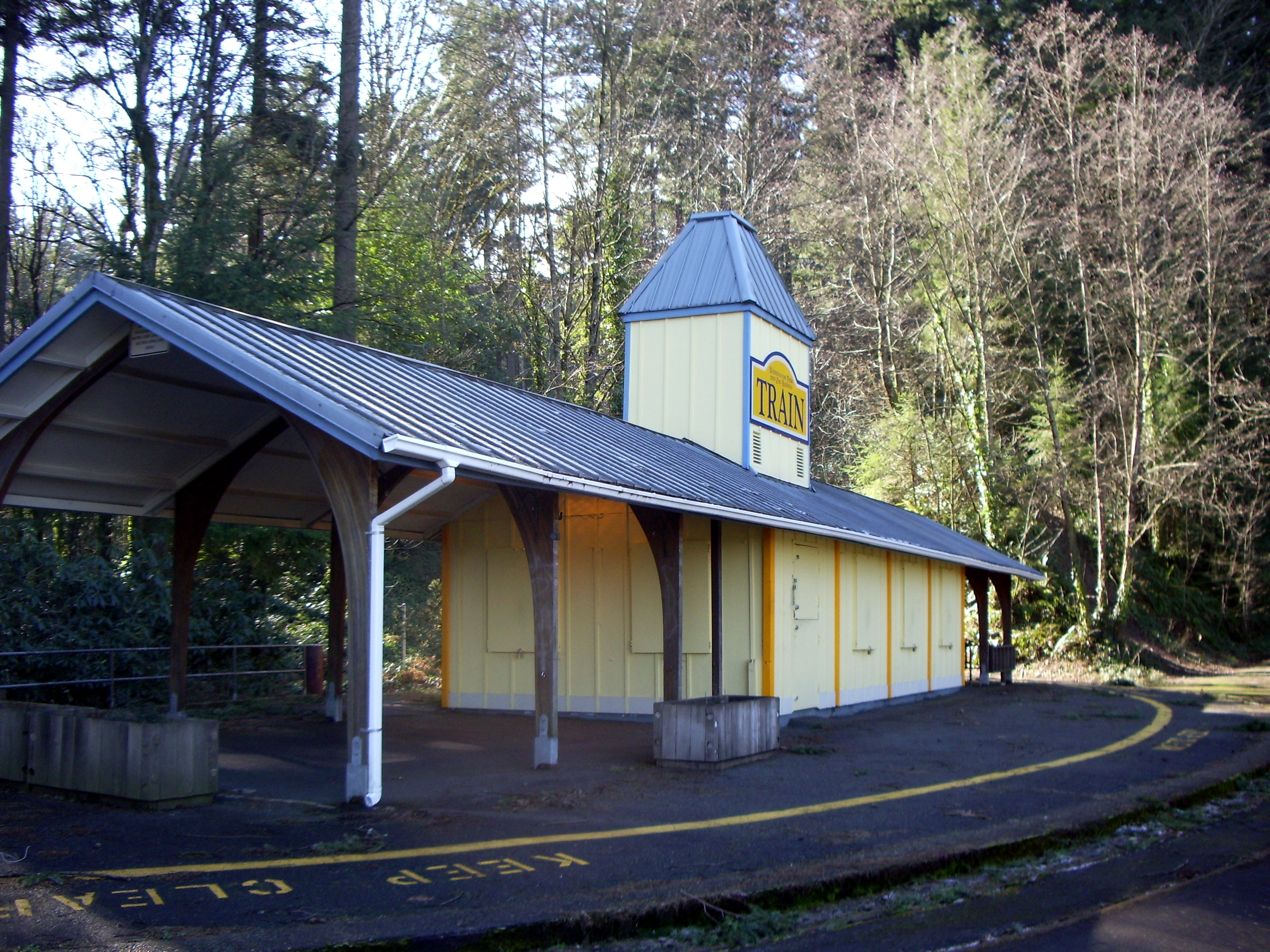
The Washington Park station (near the Rose Gardens), during its winter hibernation

Originally named the Portland Zoo Railway, the 1.2-mile (1.9 km) first section of track opened for service on June 7, 1958, and was formally dedicated on June 9, more than a year before the zoo opened fully at the same site. This service used the Zooliner trainset, the railway's first and only train at that time, and operated daily except Mondays through the summer. Meanwhile, the zoo's new West Hills site was only open on weekends, because it was still under construction, and even by August penguins and bears were the only animals moved from the old zoo, which remained in operation. The initial train service around the yet-unfinished new zoo grounds was suspended in mid-September 1958, not to resume until the zoo's opening in July 1959. A fundraising campaign was launched, to raise money to build an extension – outside the zoo grounds – through the woods of Washington Park and also to build a steam locomotive. It was decided to model the planned steam engine on a real one, a Baldwin 4-4-0 type, and construction began in the autumn, with plans to use it initially at the Oregon Centennial Exposition, scheduled to be held the following summer in North Portland (at the site of what is now the Portland Expo Center). The steam engine was named "Oregon", or alternatively "the Oregon".

In the summer of 1959, the Portland Zoo Railway operated trains at two different sites. Nos. 1 and 2, the Oregon and the Zooliner, served a temporary railway line through the grounds of the Centennial Exposition, which lasted for about three months. The Zooliner entered service on the exposition's opening day, June 10, along with a second train hauled by a utilitarian diesel switcher locomotive temporarily filling in until the new steam locomotive, No. 1, was ready. The steam locomotive entered service on June 20, and it and the streamlined Zooliner proceeded to carry passengers daily at the exposition all summer.

The railroad at the zoo's then-new site in the West Hills remained closed while construction continued on the zoo itself, but reopened on the latter's opening day, July 3, 1959 (by which time most animals had been moved from the old zoo). For the next few months, the zoo line was served only by a train hauled by the locomotive that had been used during construction of that line. That locomotive (later becoming No. 5) was a diesel engine made to look like a steam locomotive, and the train was called the Circus Train. The engine and its cars have been modified several times since and are currently known as the Oregon Express.

When the Centennial Exposition ended (on September 17, 1959), the two trains used there were moved to the new zoo line, although the steam locomotive did not enter service at the zoo until January 1960. The 1.4-mile (2.3 km) extension eastwards through the park to a new station near the Rose Gardens opened on May 28, 1960. Like the two trains, the small Washington Park "Rose Garden" station building was also first used at the Centennial Exposition and was moved to the new line after the fair closed.

The railway was renamed the Washington Park and Zoo Railway in 1978, following the zoo's change of name (in 1976) to Washington Park Zoo. At this time, July 1, 1976 (effective date), the zoo ownership was transferred from the City of Portland (City Ordinance 143589) to the Metropolitan Service District, now called Metro. The city of Portland retained ownership of the Zoo railway, and it was leased to Metro. When the zoo was renamed again in 1998, as the Oregon Zoo, the railway was not renamed.

The line also served the Oregon Museum of Science and Industry from 1958 to 1992 while that museum was located near the zoo.

=== 21st century ===
A suspension of service forecast to last at least through summer 2014 was due to begin on September 23, 2013, to allow construction of a new elephant exhibit area and changes to the railway's route within and near the zoo grounds. On November 22, 2014, operations resumed on the new Zoo Loop line within the zoo.

In May 2018, an online petition was created in opposition to the Washington Park Master Plan's endorsement to remove the "long route", which runs from the Oregon Zoo to the International Rose Test Garden. The master plan adopted by the city council that year called for the removal of all tracks and their replacement by a paved 12-foot-wide (3.7 m) path. More than 35,000 people had signed the online petition in support of keeping the longer route by July 2019 and nearly 50,000 by early 2026. In 2025, zoo officials continued to express reluctance to study a possible reopening of the long route, saying they lacked the money needed for such a project, while the Friends of Washington Park and Zoo Railway, a non-profit organization advocating for the line's reopening, was continuing to work to generate support. In February 2026, the council of Metro (the zoo's operator) indicated its support for carrying out a "comprehensive geotechnical assessment" of the route, as a step toward consideration of its possible reopening.

The railway was listed on the National Register of Historic Places in 2020 as a historic district using its original name, as the Portland Zoo Railway Historic District. The 1958-built Zooliner and 1959-built Oregon steam locomotive and their respective passenger cars were placed on the National Register, along with the railroad route itself (including the section within Washington Park), the water tank and tower, the tunnel–roundhouse complex and the Washington Park station.

== Routes ==
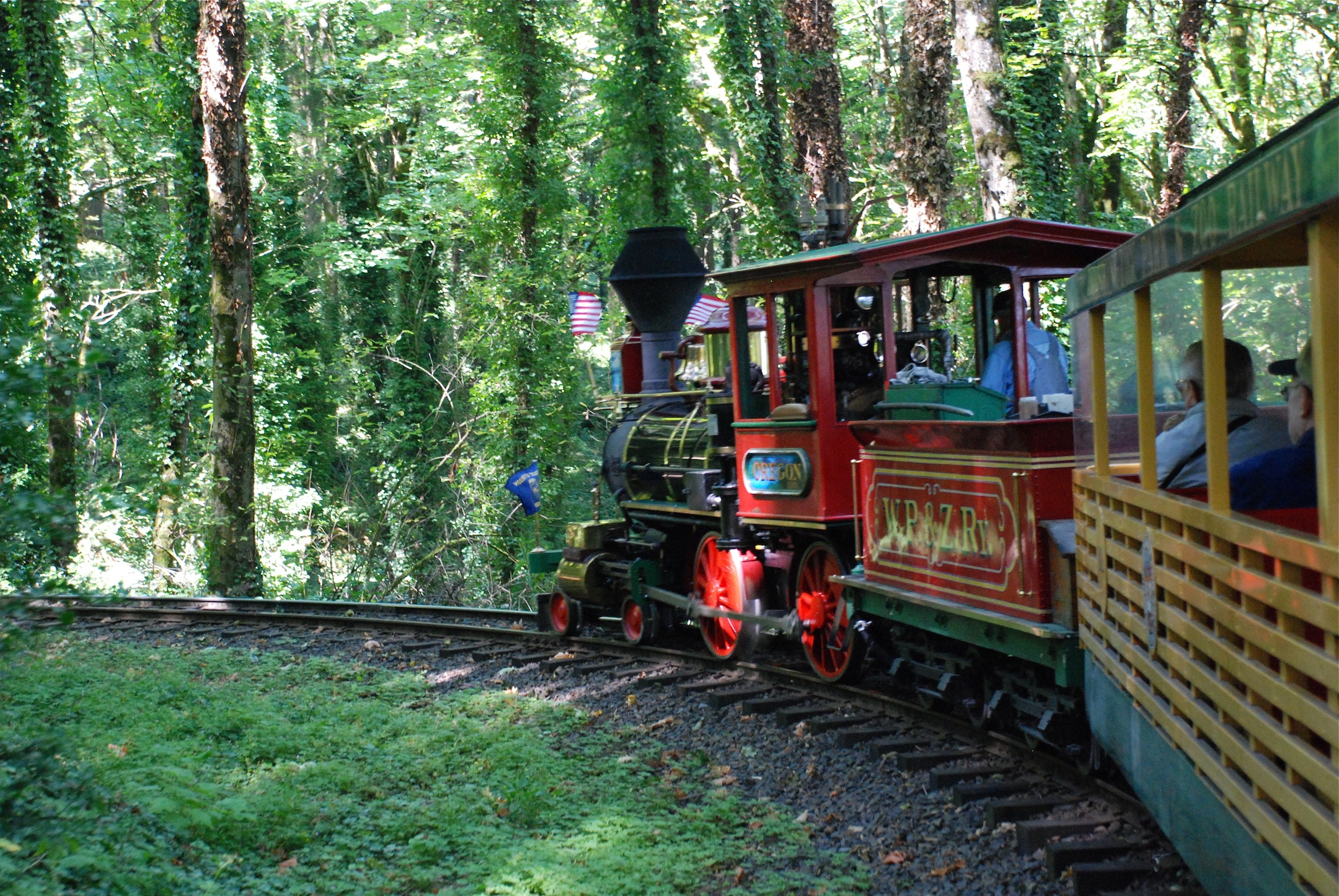
The steam train in scenery typical of the line, which runs through thick woods

The longer 35-40 minute round-trip Washington Park route previously ran on weekends from mid-April until Memorial Day and then daily through Labor Day. (However, service along this route has been suspended since the fall of 2013 for an undetermined time, as repairs are needed on a few small slides along the track.) This run went through the woods of Washington Park and the grounds of the Oregon Zoo. (Few animals are seen from the train.) The Zoo station is near the zoo entrance (45.509194°N 122.715778°W). The Washington Park station near the Rose Garden, which remains closed but is in good condition, and a contributing building of the National Historic Landmark district, is a short walk from the International Rose Test Garden (45.517509°N 122.706189°W) and Portland Japanese Garden. The line includes a section of 4.5-percent grade.

In the off-season, weather and business permitting, the 10-12 minute Zoo Loop trip runs. This run goes through the Oregon Zoo grounds only. The Washington Park trips that previously operated during spring and summer months also cover this section. The Zoo Loop is mostly a one-way loop, whereas the two-way 2-mile line through Washington Park is single-track but equipped with a few sidings to allow trains running in opposite directions to pass. This trackage is all still in place but not in service. This allowed up to three trains to be in operation at once when in service.

== Rolling stock ==
As of 2010, Washington Park and Zoo Railway has three trains in normal operation: The Zooliner No. 2, 4-4-0 No. 1 Oregon (original steam train), and Oregon Express No. 5. Two of them (the Zooliner, and 4-4-0 No. 1, Oregon) are scale replicas of real trains. In addition, there are two small switcher locomotives that are used for non-passenger purposes. Most regular service, including all non-holiday weekday service, uses only two diesel trains. The steam train operates on only a few weekends per year and for special events. In the 1980s, two of the three trains were equipped with wheelchair lifts to allow mobility-impaired persons to board the train, and in 2005 these lifts were upgraded so as to better accommodate heavier electric wheelchairs.

=== The Zooliner No. 2 ===
The Zooliner is a 5/8-scale replica of the diesel-powered Aerotrain, which is famous for its unusual shape that was influenced by automobile designs of the period when it was built, considered futuristic at the time. The Zooliner was built in 1958, its mechanical parts by Northwest Marine Iron Works and its streamlined bodywork by the H. Hirschberger Sheet Metal company of Portland. It first "officially" carried zoo guest passengers on the date of its dedication, June 9, 1958 (and this date is lettered on the side of the locomotive), but its actual first day carrying passengers was two days earlier. The Zooliner was originally powered by a 140-horsepower (100 kW) diesel engine, and is now powered by a 165-horsepower (123 kW) diesel engine with hydraulic transmission. It is numbered as WP&ZRy locomotive No. 2. The brakes are pneumatic, the same as on its full-size namesake. The train includes four or five streamlined passenger coaches pulled by matching locomotive No. 2. An additional (fifth) similar smooth-side car for the trainset was built in 1996. The rearmost car was rebuilt in late 2005 to resemble a dome car, in connection with installation of a larger and more powerful wheelchair lift.

=== 4-4-0 No. 1, Oregon ===
4-4-0 No. 1 Oregon is a 5/8-scale replica of a classic American 4-4-0 steam locomotive of the 19th century. It was built in 1959 by the Oregon Locomotive Works. It is a scale copy of the 4-4-0 locomotive, Reno, of Nevada's Virginia & Truckee Railroad (built by Baldwin Locomotive in 1872). Unlike the original, No. 1 Oregon uses oil as a power source, but it is still a real steam locomotive (not a diesel that is made to look like a steam locomotive (steam outline)). It weighs about 8 tons. It first carried passengers on June 20, 1959, on the temporary Centennial Exposition line in North Portland, but was moved to the then-new Portland Zoo site around the end of the summer, when the exposition ended. This locomotive has four associated passenger coaches built at the same time. They were designed to resemble the early twentieth century open-air excursion cars that resembled those of the Portland Electric Transit Company. They feature a clerestory roof with transom lights. Each car has a step rail to access the swinging doors. The body panels are constructed in a lattice of horizontal boards attached to a vertical board framework.

The steam locomotive's original frame broke several times during its first two decades, but a new frame was built in 1982. The Oregon was taken out of service in August 2002, in need of extensive other repairs, and was almost retired and relegated to static display, due to lack of funds to pay for the repairs. However, donations resolved this problem, and the locomotive was overhauled and returned to service on April 2, 2004. Nowadays, No. 1 is normally only scheduled to operate on a few busy weekends per year, including Memorial Day weekend and Labor Day weekend, but is also brought into use, as needed, to meet demand for train rides on weekends that have a particularly high number of visitors to the zoo. It is also normally used during the annual "Zoo Lights" event, held between Thanksgiving and New Year's Day.

=== Oregon Express No. 5 ===
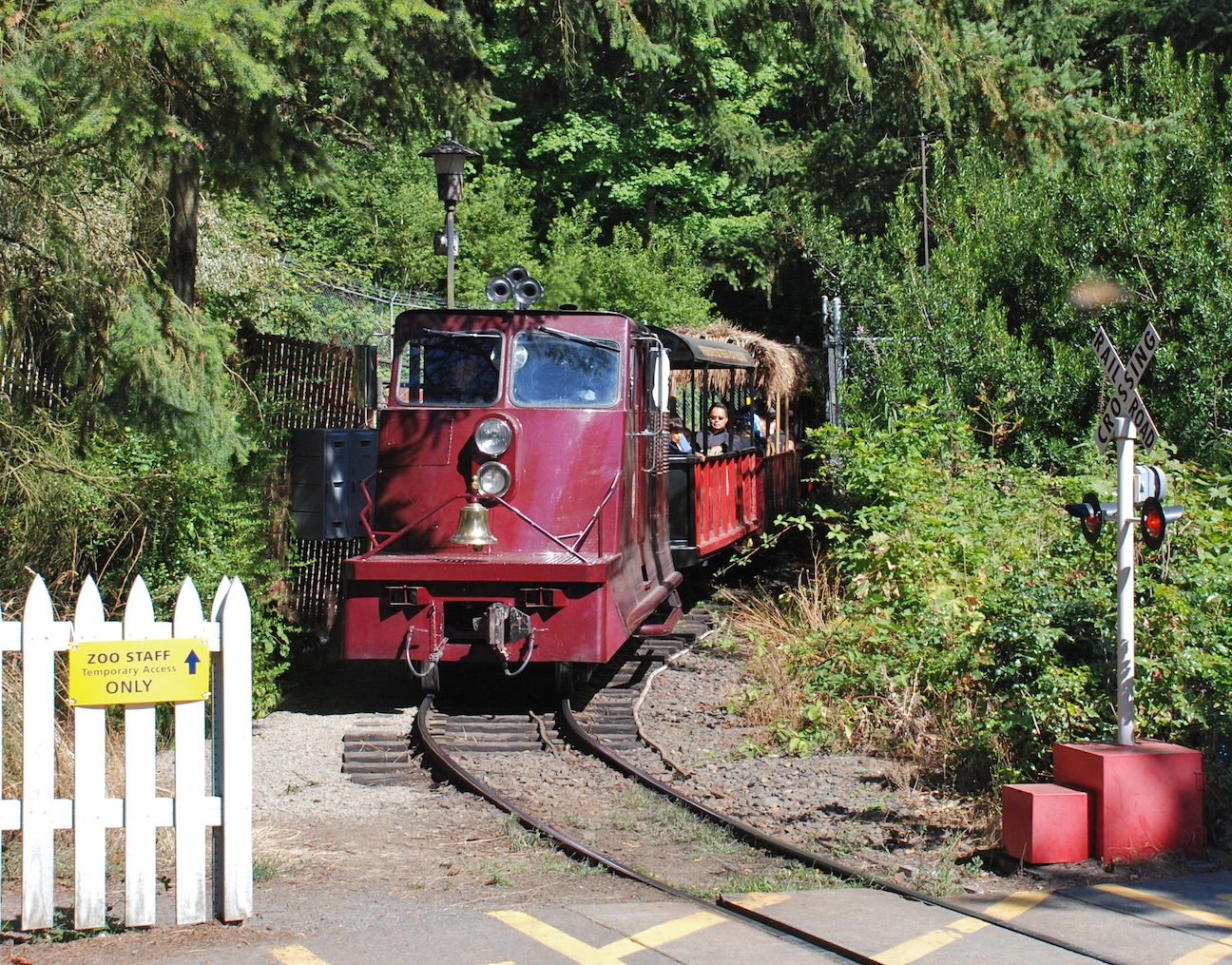
The Oregon Express entering the zoo grounds from the woods of the park

The train now known as the Oregon Express is the only one that is not a copy of a real train. Its diesel locomotive is WP&ZRy No. 5. It was built in 1940s by the Milwaukee Locomotive Co. and acquired by the Zoo from the Portland Machinery Co. in 1958. No. 5 was the original construction locomotive, named Casey Pioneer, used for laying the original portion of the Zoo Loop track in the zoo in 1958. It operated at the Portland Zoo in 1959 while the other two locomotives and coaches were operating at the Oregon Centennial. It was made to look like a steam train at that time and called the Circus Train. It was later rebuilt a few times to a relatively more modern style, with a slanted front end. The color scheme and decorative motif of the train have been changed a few times, as has the train's name, which has gone from the Casey Pioneer to the Circus Train to the Astroliner to the Orient Express to the Oregon Express. This locomotive has four associated passenger coaches.

=== Other locomotives ===
Locomotives No. 3, built in 1929, and No. 6, built in 1938, are small industrial diesel locomotives, not normally used for passenger service. They are used for track maintenance and switching, but if needed can haul the passenger cars of the Oregon Express or Oregon trains as a substitute for those trains' regular locomotives (Nos. 5 and 1). Both were acquired secondhand from Weyerhaeuser. No. 3 resembles an early EMD switcher.

== Mail ==
The line carries U.S. mail and was one of the first recreational railroads to have its own postmark, and is the last railroad in the United States to have continually offered hand-cancelling and processing of mail. The postal cancellation stamp was issued to the railroad by the U.S. Postal Service in 1961. The locomotive of the Zooliner has a postal mail slot on the side of the cab, and mail boxes are located at the Zoo and Washington Park stations.

== Gallery ==
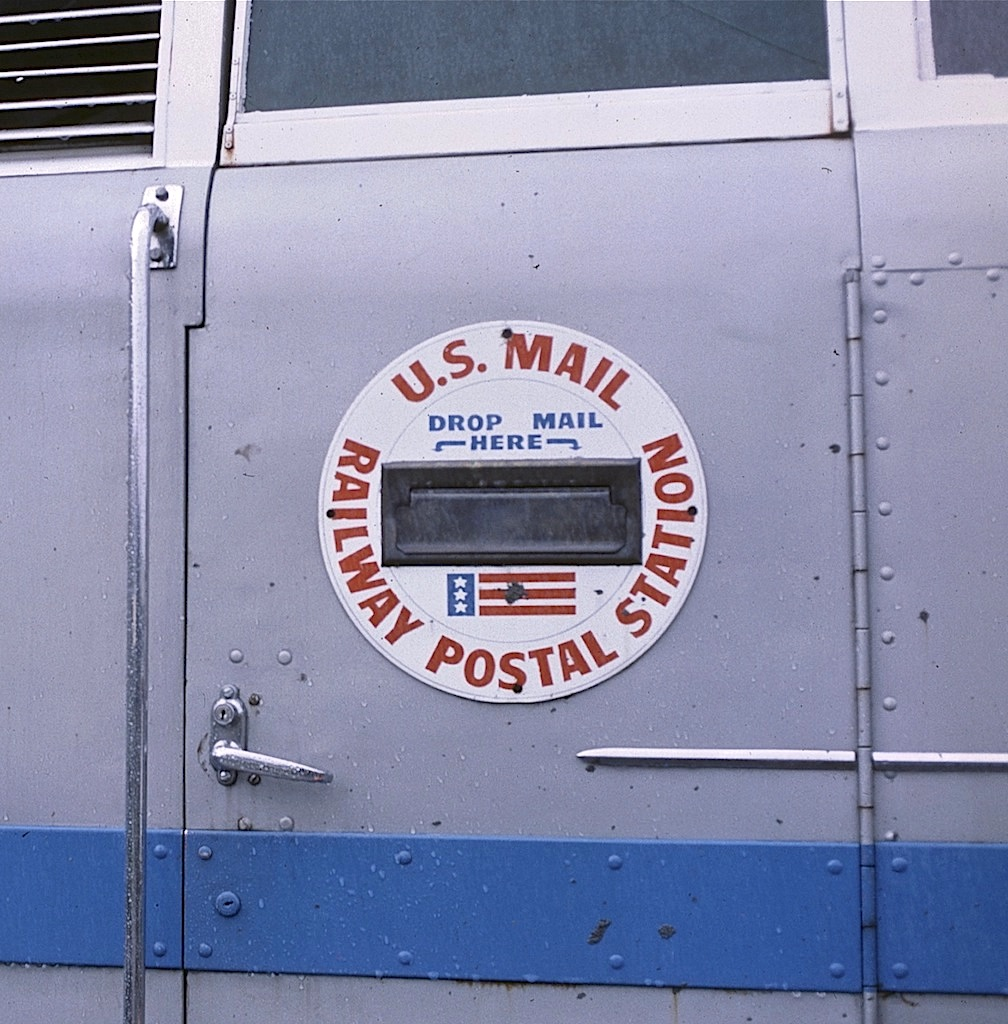
U.S. mail slot in cab door of the Zooliner

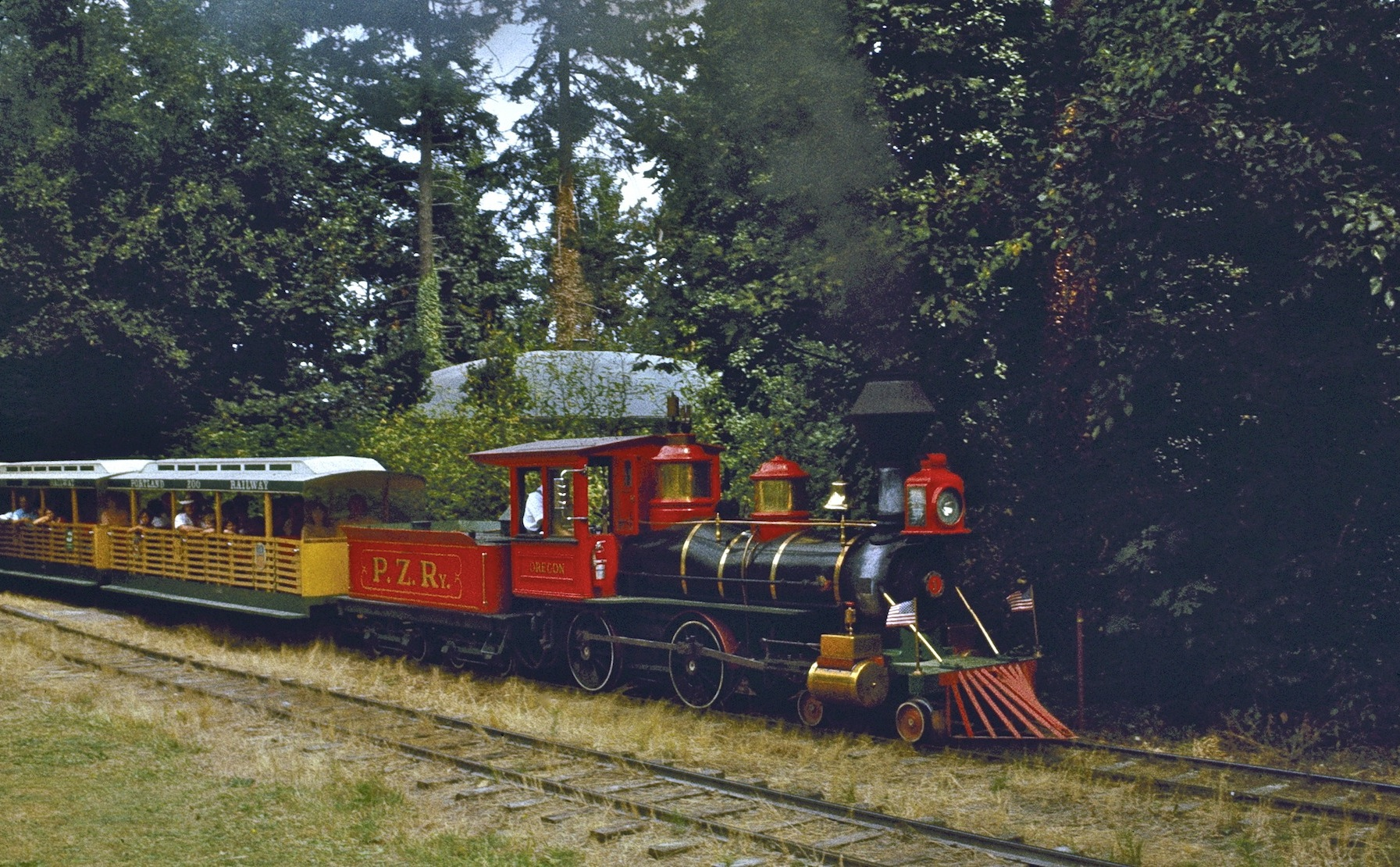
The steam train when still lettered as "Portland Zoo Railway", summer of 1980

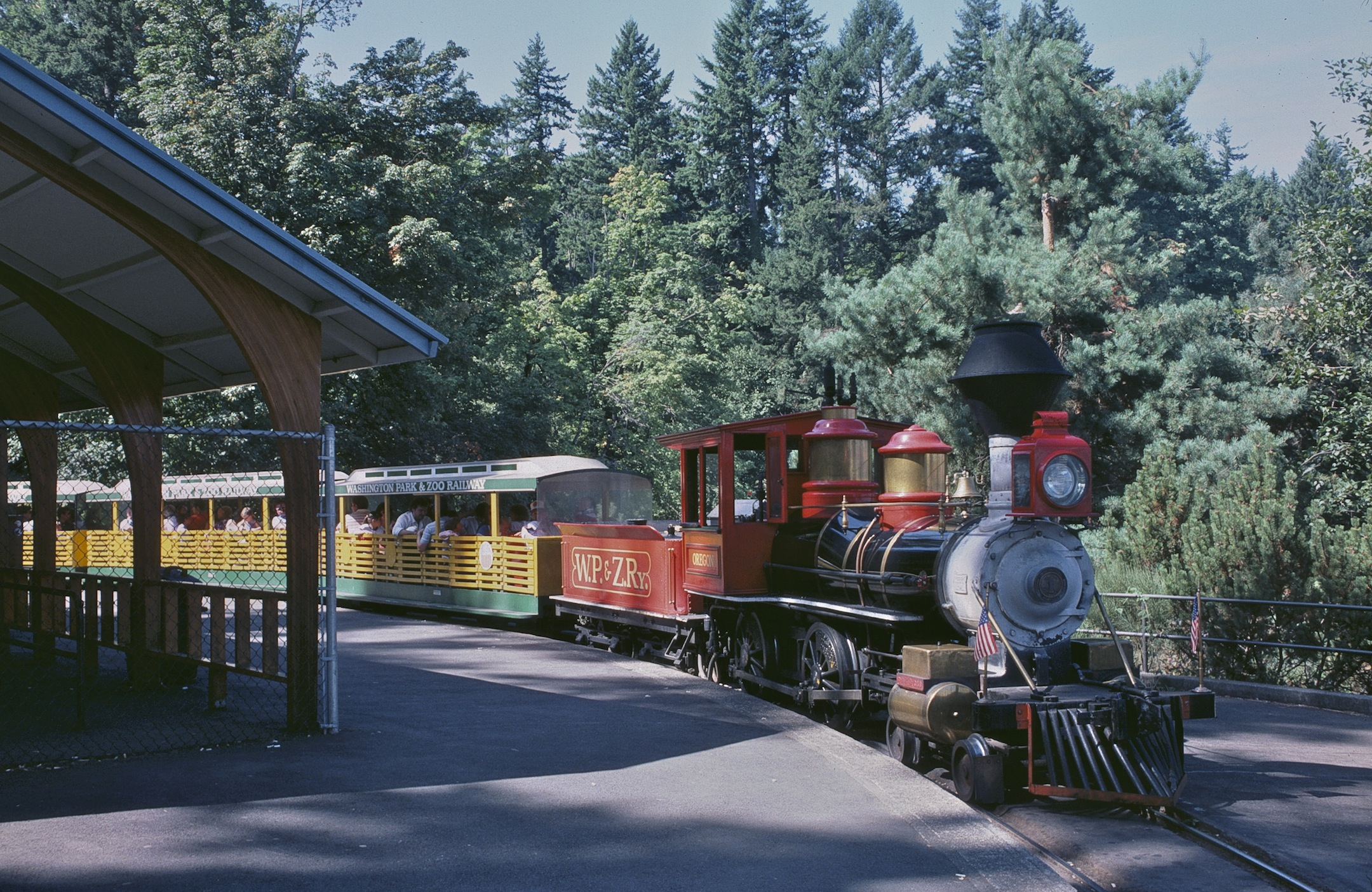
No. 1 wore a different paint scheme in some years of the 1980s and 1990s

Video of Zooliner departing from Rose Garden station

== See also ==
- Amusement rides on the National Register of Historic Places
- Railway Mail Service
