= Virginia and Truckee 11 Reno =

American railroad locomotive

Virginia and Truckee Railroad 11
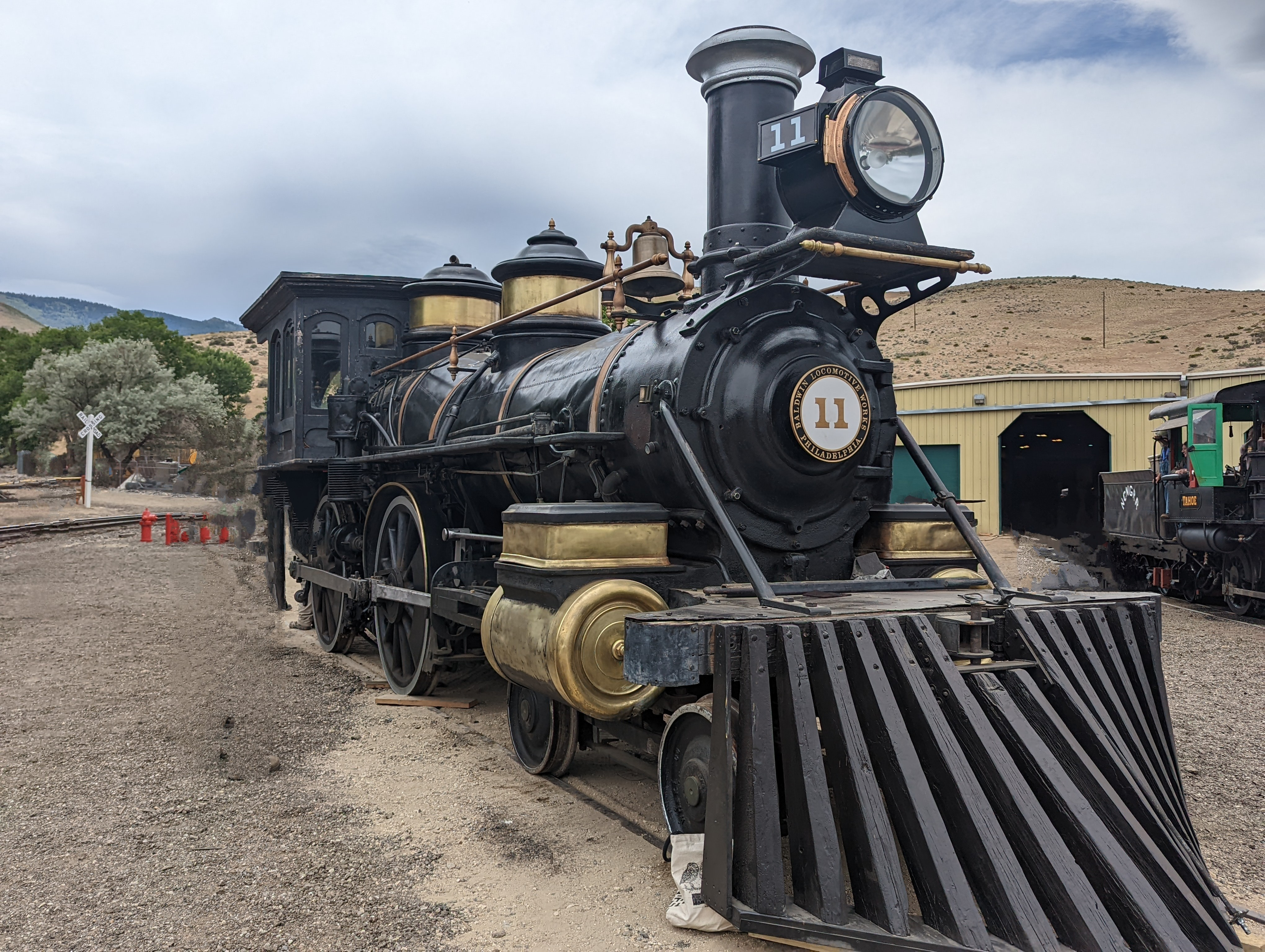
- The "Reno" in 2022
Type and origin
- Builder: Baldwin Locomotive Works
- Serial number: 2816
- Model: 27-1/2 C
- Build date: May 1872
Specifications
- Configuration
  - Whyte: 4-4-0
- Driver dia.: 57 in (1,448 mm)
- Loco weight: 68 short tons (61.7 t)
- Fuel type: Oil
- Boiler pressure: 130 psi (0.90 MPa)
- Cylinders: Two, outside
- Cylinder size: 16 in × 24 in (410 mm × 610 mm)
- Valve gear: Stephenson
- Valve type: Side valve
- Loco brake: Air
- Train brakes: Air
- Couplers: Knuckle
Performance figures
- Tractive effort: 11,920 lbf (53.02 kN)
Career
- Operators: Virginia and Truckee Railroad
- Numbers: VT 11
- Official name: Reno
- First run: July 11, 1872
- Retired: July 22, 1943
- Current owner: Virginia and Truckee Railroad
- Disposition: Undergoing restoration to operating condition

Virginia and Truckee Railroad 11, the "Reno", is a 4-4-0 "American" type steam locomotive. It is one of three largely identical 4-4-0 locomotives built by Baldwin for the railroad, the others being the Genoa and the Inyo, and one of four V&T 4-4-0's preserved (the aforementioned three as well as the Dayton). The engine is one of Hollywood's most prodigious Flanged Star, starring in over 120 films, commercials, and television episodes starting in 1937. Today, the 2nd oldest surviving example of the Baldwin 4-4-0 type is undergoing restoration at her original home in Virginia City, Nevada.

== 1872–1901 ==
Virginia & Truckee #11 was built by the Baldwin Locomotive Works in their Philadelphia, Pennsylvania plant in May 1872. The locomotive was received by the V&T and inaugurated as the "Reno" in July of that same year, hauling passenger trains between Steamboat Springs and the Central Pacific Railroad connection in Reno, Nevada. That same year, she would run an Officer Special from Reno to the State Capital of Carson City, Nevada, inaugurating through service from the mines of the Comstock Lode & later "Big Bonanza" to the investors of San Francisco and beyond.

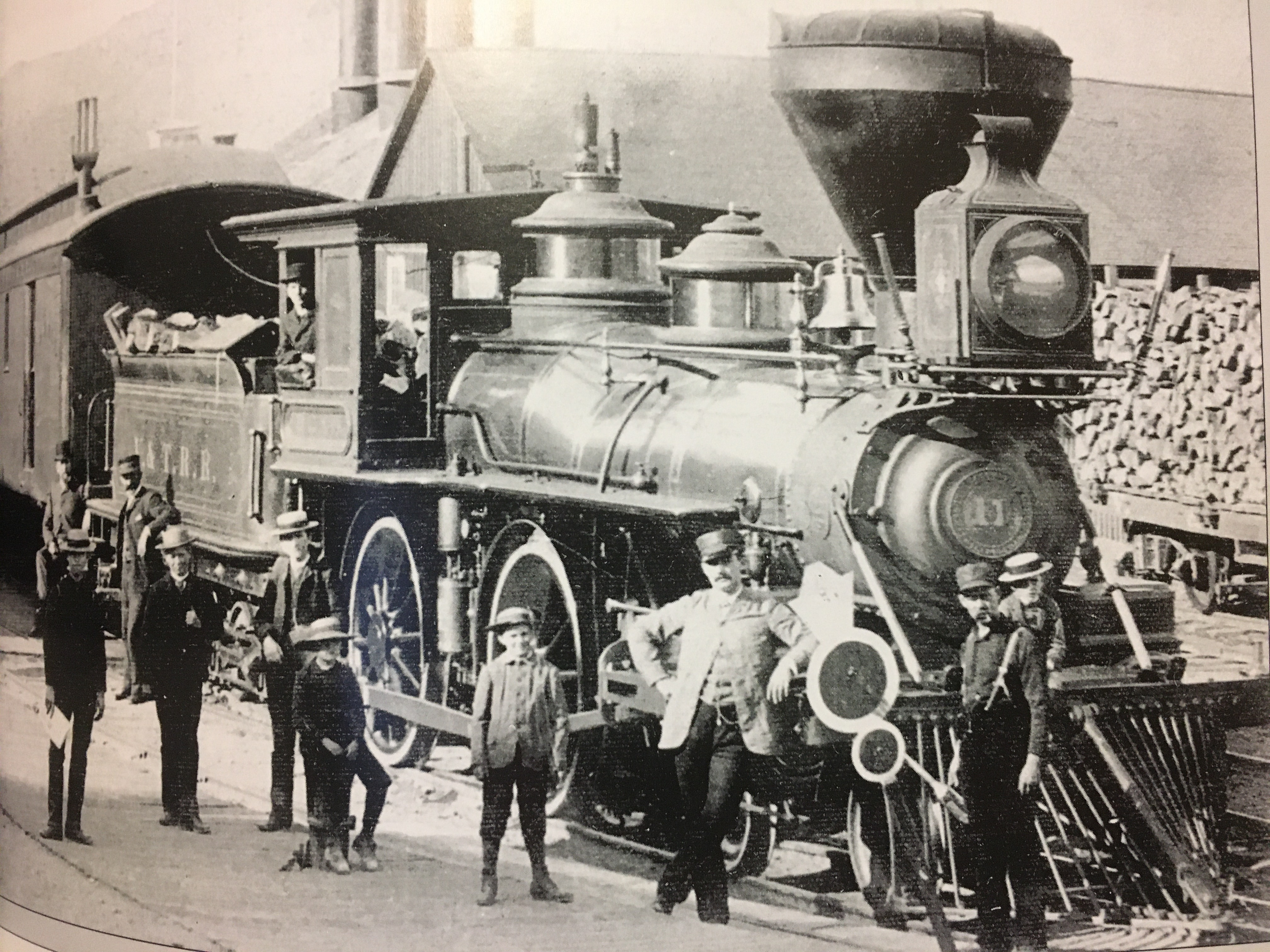
Virginia & Truckee Railroad #11, "Reno", with the Lightning Express at Virginia City (Stephan Drew Collection)

As the first true passenger locomotive of the fleet, the Reno would be used almost every day handling passenger trains between Virginia City, Carson, & Reno from 1872 until 1902. Despite the arrival of V&T 4-4-0's #12, 17, 18, & 22, the Reno would remain a constant sight on the railroad running everything from local passenger services to crack expresses. The Reno would see most of her milage on the head-end of the "Lightning Express", a daily overnight passenger service between Virginia City and the Central Pacific's ferry terminal in Vallejo, California where passengers would then take a ferry to San Francisco. Such was the wealth of the Comstock Lode that Ulysses S. Grant, Theodore Roosevelt, Rutherford B. Hayes, & Herbert Hoover all visited the town either as president or shortly thereafter.

Like many of her contemporaries, the Reno would see many alterations to her appearance as the tastes and technology of the times changed. The Reno would receive Westinghouse Air Brake Company patented straight air in 1874 & Miller platform couplers in 1878. Her stacks would also change as shown in her many photographs.

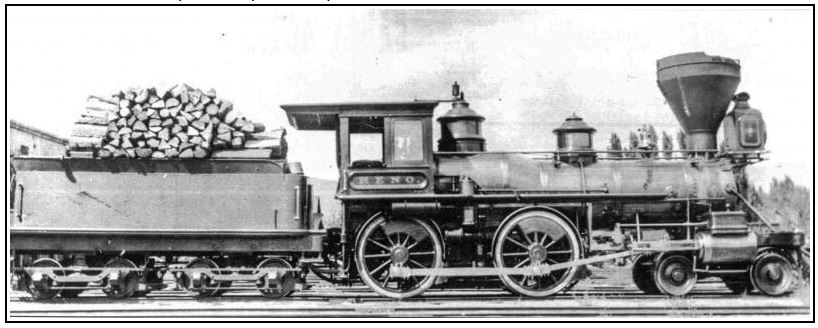
Virginia & Truckee Railroad #11, Reno. At Carson City in the mid-1870s. (Stephan Drew Collection)

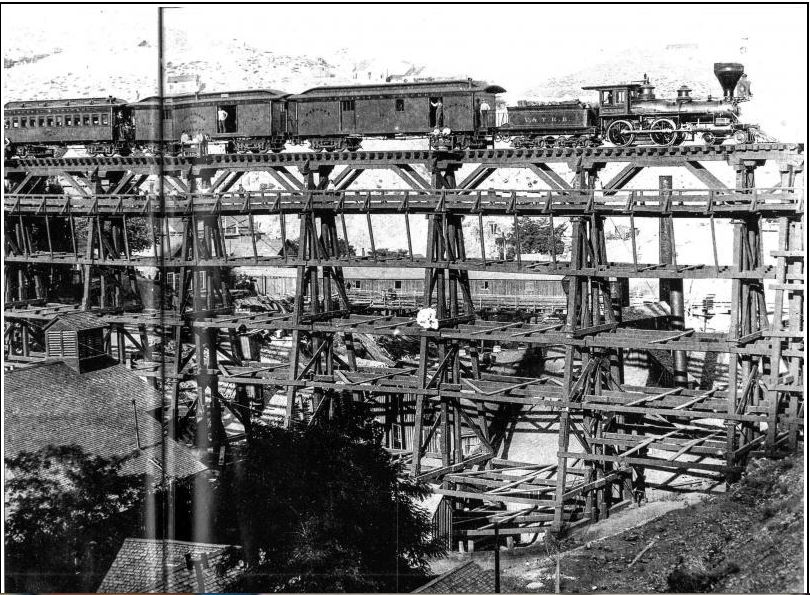
The "Reno" pulling the Lightning Express over the Crown Point Trestle, at Gold Hill, Nevada, on its way to Carson City in the 1870s. The trestle was built in 1869 and lasted until 1936.(Stephan Drew Collection)

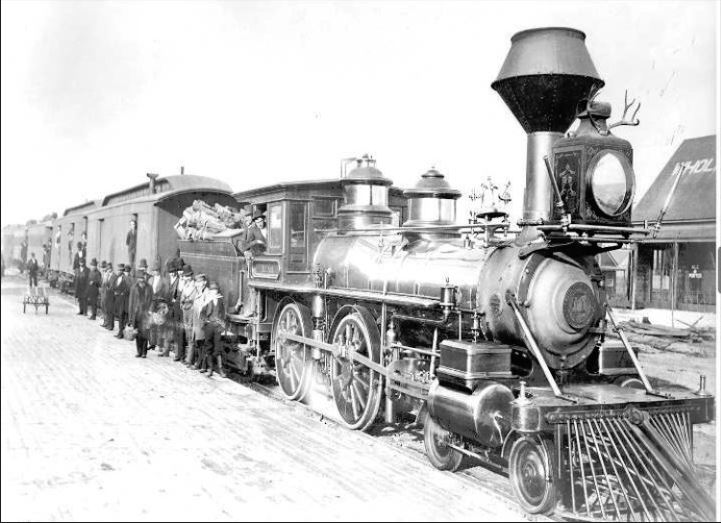
Virginia & Truckee Railroad No. 11, the "Reno," at Carson City with the Lightning Express, in 1878. Her proud engineer, Tom Clark, has mounted a beautiful set of antlers on the box headlight. (Stephan Drew Collection)

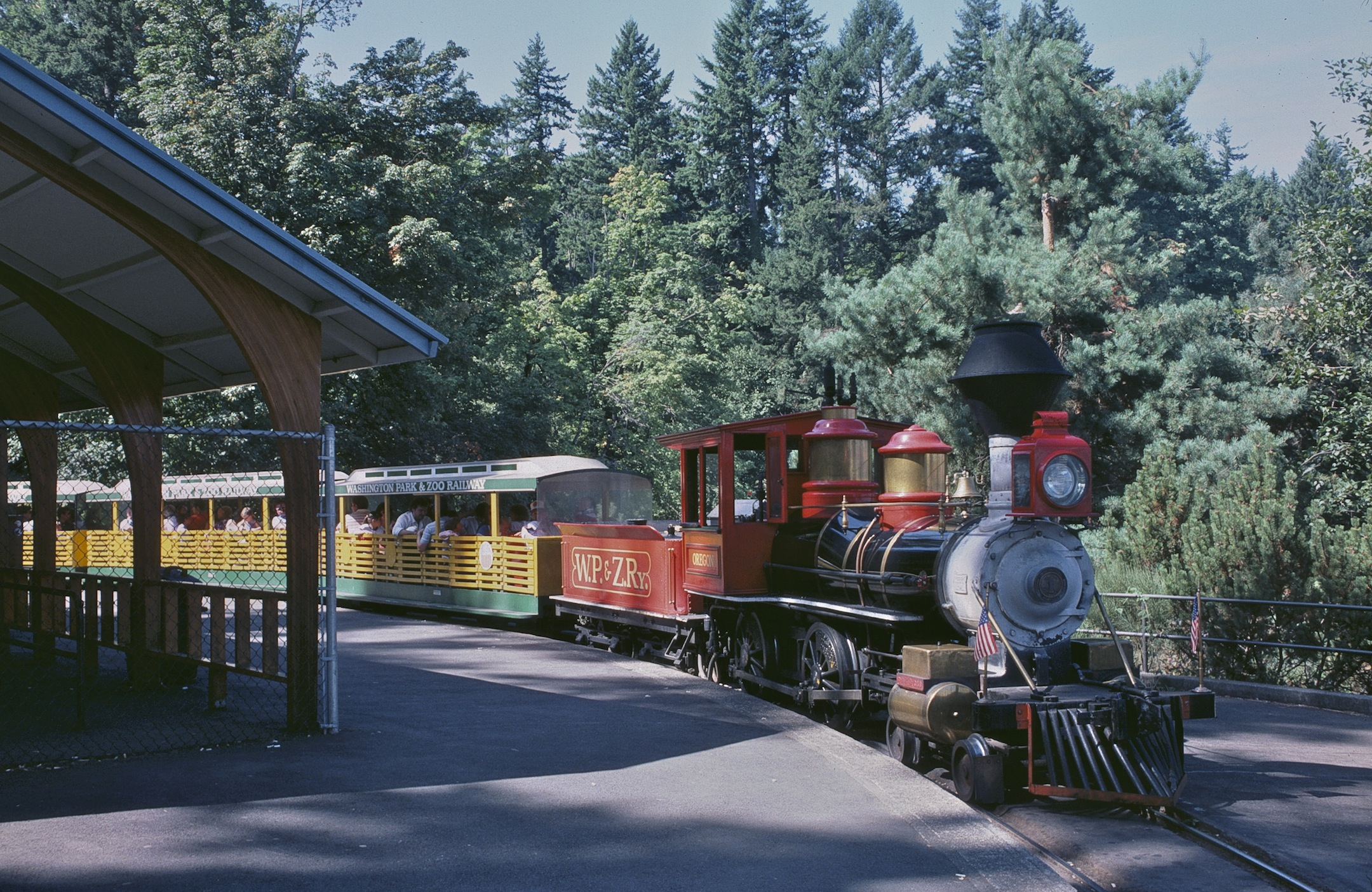
The Washington Park & Zoo Railway at the zoo in Portland, Oregon, operates a scale replica (30-inch gauge) of the "Reno."

== 1902–1945 ==
In 1902, the Reno was upgraded with Tower Couplers and Westinghouse Automatic Air per Interstate Commerce Commission orders. In 1907, the Reno would be the first V&T engine to make the jump from wood/coal firing to burning fuel oil. From there, she would continue to see regular revenue service, even after daily passenger service got axed in 1924.

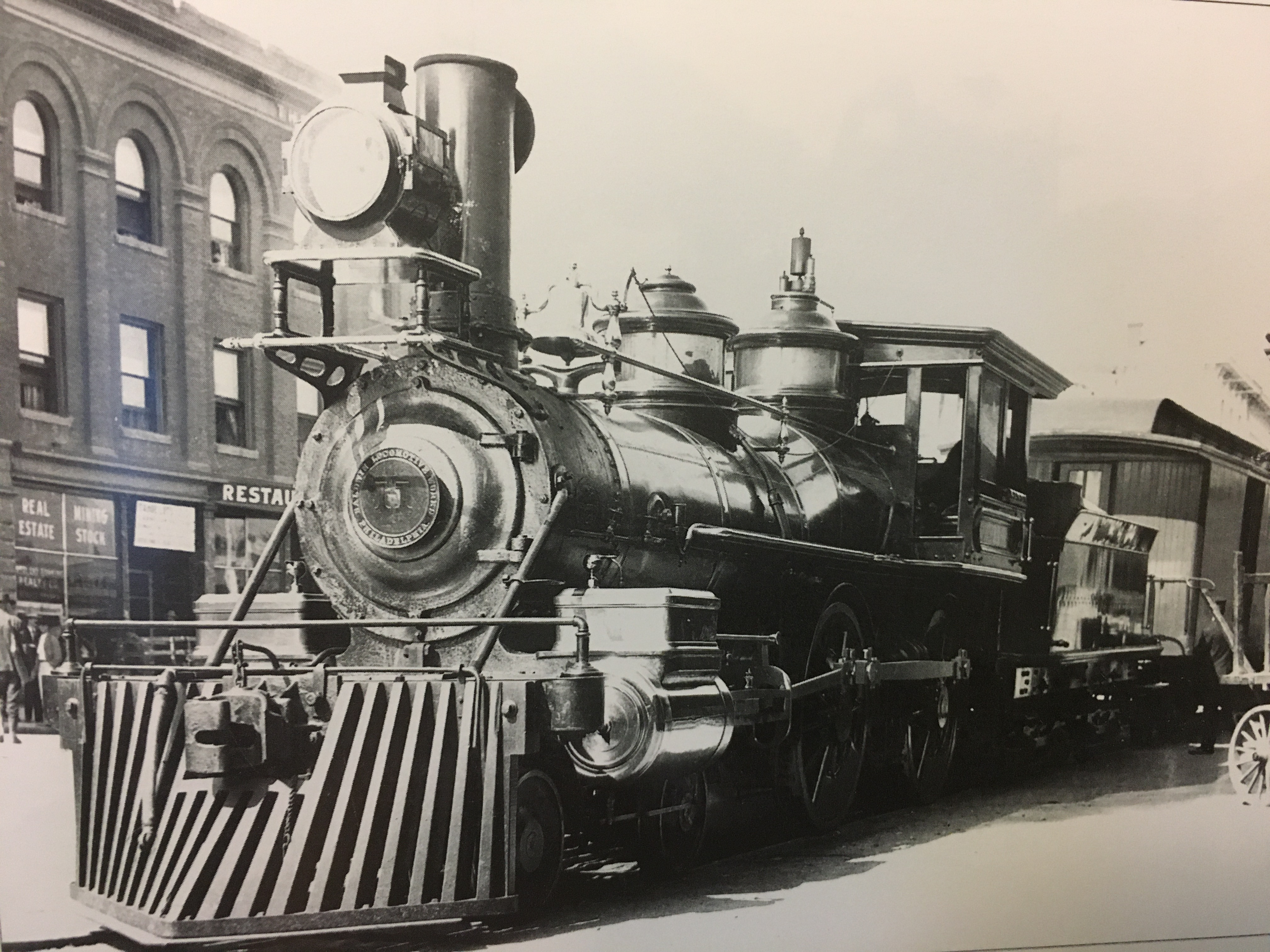
The "Reno" in about 1913 (Stephan Drew Collection)

By 1934, the "Reno" was no longer in regular service due to her worn-out condition and lack of funds by the V&T. But she would still be instrumental in the railroad's story. In 1937, it was rented to Universal Films Corporation for an unreleased episode of Bob Baker's "Singing Cowboy" Series. On June 4, 1938, the Reno would haul the last freight train into Virginia City with author & historian Ted Wurm as her brakeman. The next day, she would pull the California-Nevada excursion along with locomotive 27. One of her passengers was a teenaged Bob Gray who would later revive the railroad. In July of that same year, she would pull the last two trains from Carson City to Virginia City. In September 1938, V&T #11 was rented to Paramount Studios for use in the movie "Union Pacific". There, she was wrecked during setup for a scene after the ropes attaching the 1872 Baldwin to the crane snapped and she rolled. The locomotive was returned to the V&T after multiple shoppings in 1939.

The #11 was last operated on the V&T in 1943 and subsequently sold to Loew's Inc./Metro-Goldwyn-Mayer in 1945.

== 1945 to present ==
While in MGM's care, the locomotive would be used in 28 films and television episodes including Annie Get Your Gun, Union Pacific, The Twilight Zone, and Rawhide.

In celebration of the 100th Anniversary of the completion of the Transcontinental railroad, the Reno would be dressed as engine 119 for the festivities with her sister #12 playing the part of the Jupiter.

In 1970, the locomotive was sold to Old Tucson Studios where she would continue her Hollywood projects like Wild Wild West, The Life and Times of Judge Roy Bean, Tombstone, Kenny Rogers as The Gambler, and more. The locomotive would shoot its final movie with Old Tucson in 2015.

In 2021, the "Reno" was purchased from Old Tucson by the modern-day incarnation of the Virginia & Truckee Railroad with plans to restore the locomotive to operable condition.
