= Omaha Zoo Railroad =

Railroad attraction in Nebraska, US

Coordinates: 41°13′44″N 95°55′39″W

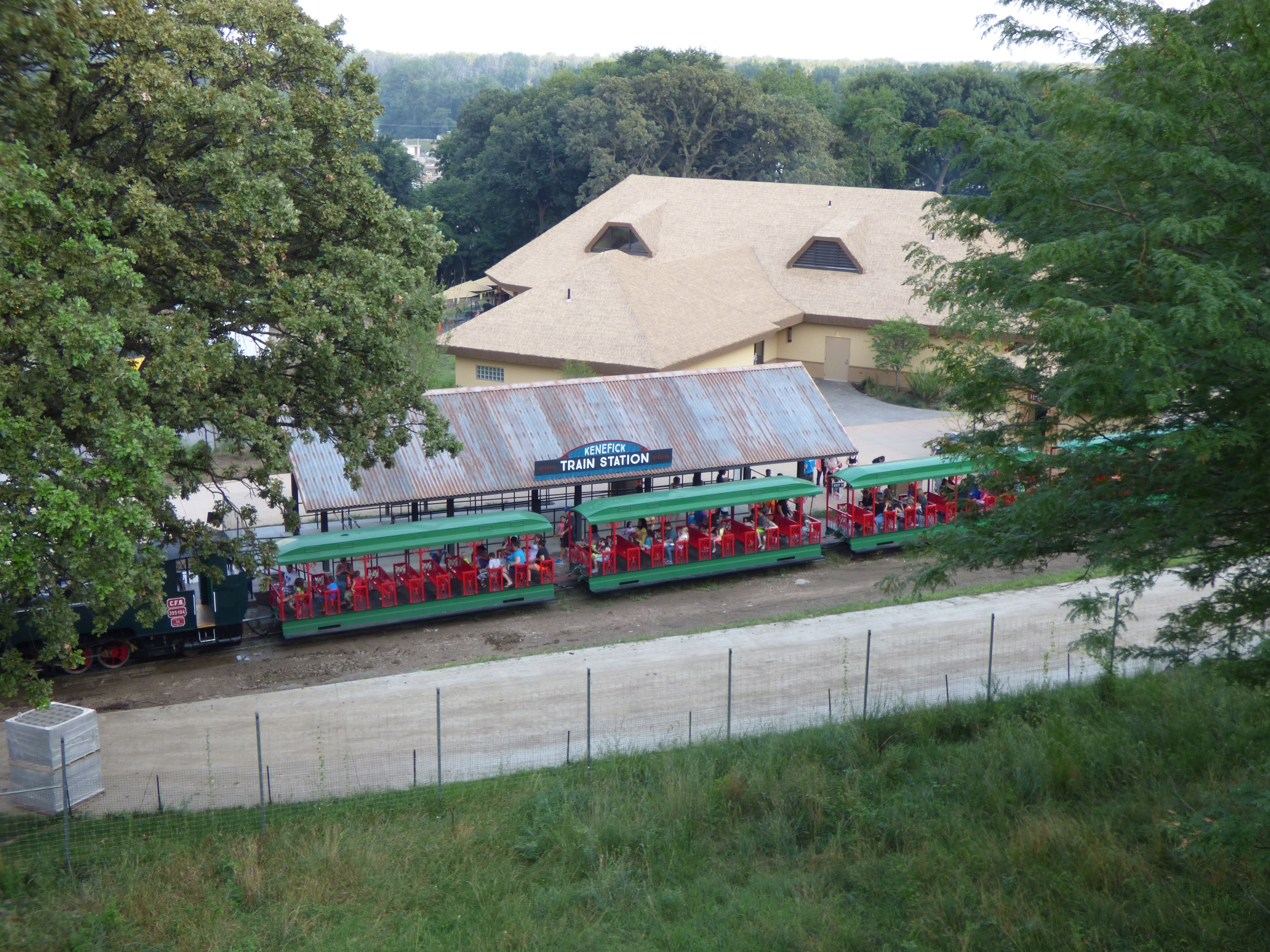
- Kenefick Train Station

Overview
- Headquarters: Omaha, Nebraska
- Reporting mark: OZRR
- Locale: Henry Doorly Zoo & Aquarium in Omaha, Nebraska
- Dates of operation: 1968–present

Technical
- Track gauge: 2 ft 6 in (762 mm)
- Length: 1.8 miles

Other

The Omaha Zoo Railroad (OZRR) is a 2 ft 6 in (762 mm) tourist railroad located in the Henry Doorly Zoo & Aquarium in Omaha, Nebraska. The railroad offers a narrow gauge excursion train for zoo visitors hauled by a steam locomotive. The train loads passengers at two stations within the zoo. Annual ridership of the Omaha Zoo Railroad is over 200,000 people.

== History ==
The Omaha Zoo Railroad was one of the first major attractions added after the zoo's 1963 re-incorporation as the Henry Doorly Zoo. As part of its centennial celebration, the Omaha-based Union Pacific Railroad decided to sponsor the construction of a ridable miniature railroad at the zoo. The zoo's railroad initially had just over two miles (3.2 km) of 2 ft 6 in (762 mm) narrow gauge track (roughly half the width of standard mainline railroad tracks) in the form of a twisted oval with a connecting track through the middle. Two wyes (Y-shaped track arrangements enabling the train to reverse direction) were constructed at the intersections of the connecting track and the main oval. The track was laid using rail from the Union Pacific's Encampment branch in Wyoming. Due to the hilly terrain of the zoo's riverside location, grades of up to 6% (for most railroads 2% is considered steep) were required and some of the curves were well under 150 feet (46 m) in radius. Track crews from the Union Pacific were brought in to lay the track, and operation commenced on July 22, 1968, under the supervision of UP Roadmaster Robert Kovar.

Fitting for a railroad attraction sponsored by the Union Pacific, the Omaha Zoo Railroad was initially themed after the UP's first transcontinental railroad route, for which Omaha was the eastern terminus. Passengers boarded at the "Omaha Depot" located in the Aksarben Nature Kingdom (today known as Glacier Bay Landing) and rode to "Promontory Junction" at the south end of the zoo's lagoon. Here, passengers had the option of disembarking at the small depot and catching a later train back to Omaha. The ride also featured a climb up the 6% grade of "Sherman Hill" named after Union Pacific's own grade over the continental divide in Wyoming. The steam locomotive was painted and decorated to resemble Union Pacific's No. 119 (the famous locomotive used in the laying of the real "golden spike" marking the transcontinental line's completion), and the four coaches were given names significant to the UP's history. UP's influence was perhaps most evident in the Omaha Zoo Railroad's logo: a Union Pacific shield with the Esso tiger superimposed. Though the direct references to Union Pacific place names have faded over the years, UP's support of the zoo's railroad has remained strong. For years the train equipment was trucked to the Union Pacific's Omaha shops for winter maintenance. When these shops closed, much of the machinery was donated to build a new shop on-site at the zoo. The Union Pacific Engine House, as this building is called, was dedicated in July 1994. Union Pacific crews maintain the crossing signals along the railroad to this day.

During the 1970s, the Omaha Zoo Railroad (and the zoo as a whole) saw large increases in attendance. Especially on the weekends, it became evident that the original four-car train could not provide the needed capacity, and a search was begun for a second train. By chance, a small tank locomotive of Austrian Heritage named "Riva" was found in Romania, and its owner Plasser & Theurer was willing to donate it to the zoo. The locomotive was restored in UP's shops and entered service at the zoo in 1976. Two additional coaches were purchased and added to the roster that same year. In 1981, the Kenefick Station was added directly behind the Giraffe Complex. This allowed guests to board the train closer to the zoo's main entrance. The Promontory Junction Station was abandoned in the early 1990s. In the early 2000s, a separate building was constructed for Kenefick Station near the original location. After the 2014 season, Kenefick Station was demolished and the track was shortened to make room for the new African Grasslands exhibit. The latest Kenefick Station opened in 2015 directly across from the Truhlsen African Lodge.

In the early years, the train commonly ran figure eights through the zoo using the connecting track and often reversed direction on the wyes. This practice ended in the early 1970s due to the need for faster turnarounds and Riva's inability to negotiate a tight curve on the north (Bailey) wye. The connecting track lay idle for two decades before finally being removed in the mid-1990s. Short sections of the track remained on the western and eastern respectively, which were used for storing railcars not being used. These last remnants of the connecting trackage were removed in 2016, and new sidings for rolling stock were installed near Omaha depot. Today, the trains circle the park clockwise, covering roughly 1.8 miles (2.9 km) and taking 15–20 minutes on each circuit.

Beginning in 2010, both trains have operated simultaneously on busy weekends, allowing more frequent departures from the two stations. Generally, the train is not open before March or after October.

== Omaha Zoo Railroad Trains ==
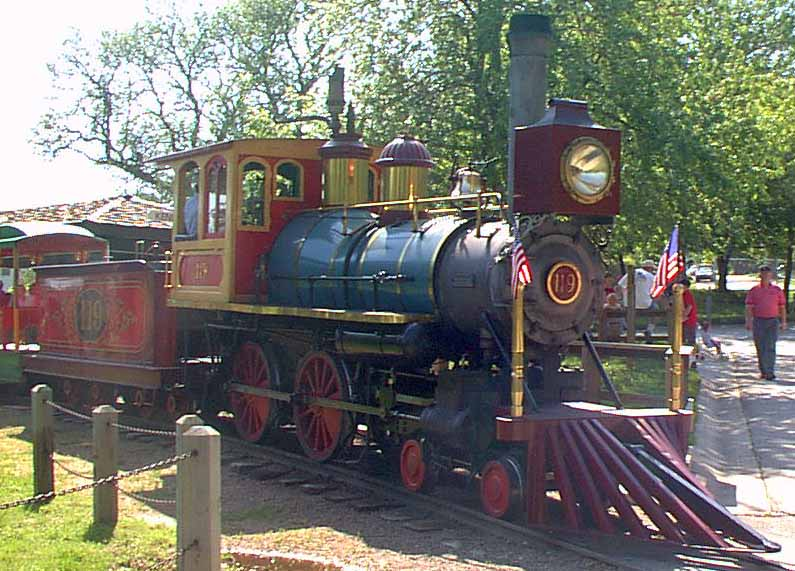
Engine 119, original locomotive of the Omaha Zoo Railroad

Visitors to the Henry Doorly Zoo ride behind one of two locomotives for the 1.8-mile (2.9 km) trip around the park. Although they are similar in the basic principle of their operation, the two locomotives are otherwise quite different, and guests can easily distinguish between them.

119 is the first of the zoo's two locomotives and regularly hauls a train of five open-air coaches. It is a 4-4-0 "American" type locomotive, meaning that it has four pilot wheels to help guide it through curves, 4 large driving wheels, and no trailing wheels. This type of locomotive was prevalent on American railroads from 1850 to about 1880, thus earning it the nickname "American Standard". This engine is known for its colorful paint scheme, polished brass, and sweet-sounding Nathan six-chime whistle.

No. 119 was the original locomotive on the Omaha Zoo Railroad and was custom-built for the zoo in 1968. It was built by Crown Metal Products of Wyano, Pennsylvania, a company that built replica steam trains for amusement parks and zoos all over the country. In honor of zoo railroad benefactor Union Pacific, the engine was decorated to resemble the Union Pacific's ceremonial engine used at the 1869 completion of the first transcontinental railroad. During 119's first years at the zoo, it struggled to pull the train up the steep hills. Subsequent modifications by the Union Pacific and the Zoo railroad's own shop have drastically improved it. After a major rebuild in 1996–1999, it was deemed to be in better-than-new condition. During the rebuild, the engine also received a cosmetic makeover. Originally painted black and red, it emerged resplendent in a beautiful maroon and blue scheme and featured a new wooden cab. In 2022, the cab received a small placard honoring the late Henry Morris Jr. who served the railroad for 36 years.

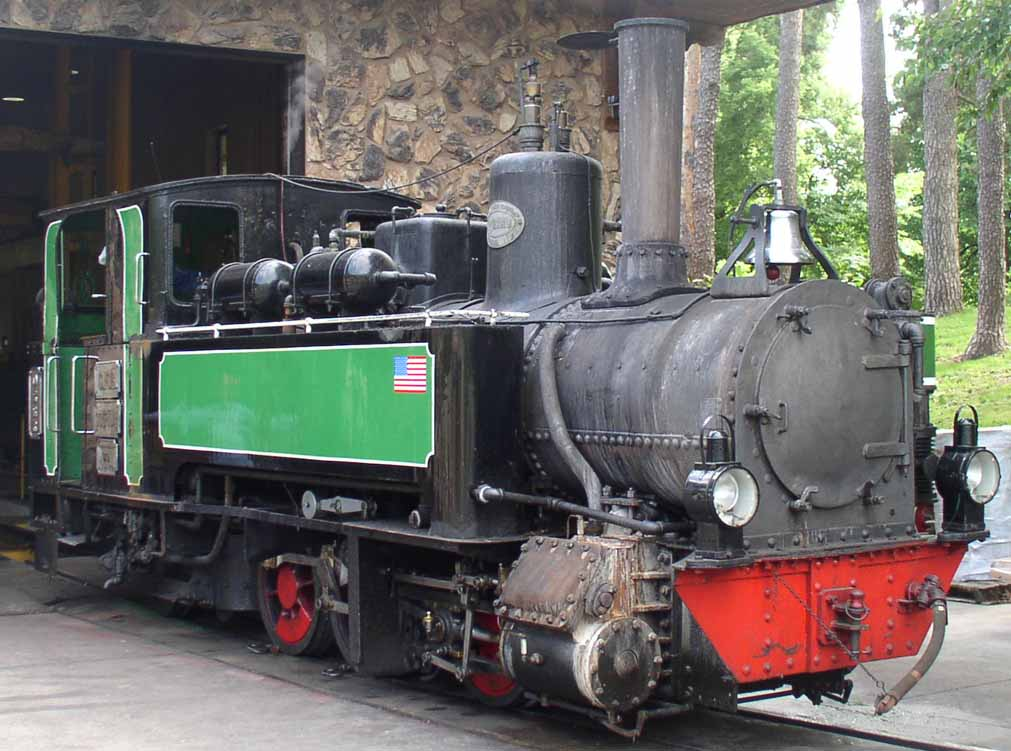
1890 steam locomotive "Riva", CFR no. 395-104

Riva, number 104, is the zoo's second steam locomotive which was acquired in 1974. It is an S-class 0-6-2 tank locomotive, meaning that it carries its fuel oil and water in tanks on the locomotive rather than in a separate tender (as does 119). It has six small driving wheels and large cylinders, making it extremely powerful for its size. A two-wheel trailing truck supports the firebox and cab. This locomotive is known for its shrill European whistle. Generating a tractive effort of 10,600 pounds, it has almost twice the pulling power of 119 and typically operates with a train consisting of six open-air coaches + a caboose.

Riva began its long career in 1890 when it was turned out by the Krauss Works of Linz, Austria as serial number 2360. Its first owner was the M.A.R. (Mori–Arco–Riva del Garda) Railway in the northern Italian region of Trentino-South Tyrol. 104 served for 2 years alongside two identical sister engines, "Arco" and "Lago di Garda." The railway was closed when Italy entered World War I in 1915. The railway was on the front line and then sustained heavy damage, while "Riva" was sent to work on the Heeresfeldbahn (field military railways) in the Eastern front. From 1918 to 1941, it served an industrial railway in Stryj, Poland. World War II brought another stint in military duty before the engine finally ended up on the State Railways of Romania (CFR) as number 395–104. "Riva" operated on the CFR's Alba Julia–Zlatna line until 1968, when it was finally retired and sold to Plasser & Theurer, an Austria-based builder of track maintenance machinery.

An American representative of Plasser & Theurer became aware of the Omaha Zoo's search for a second locomotive, and in 1974 arrangements were made for "Riva" to be donated to the zoo. Restoration took place in the Union Pacific's Omaha shops. The overhaul consisted of major running gear work, American air brake equipment installation, and conversion from coal to oil fuel. The locomotive was then painted, and missing parts such as the headlights and bell were replaced. The reborn "Riva" entered service at the zoo in 1976 during the annual Family Night/Members' Day event, and has operated almost every year since. A major multi-year overhaul took place in the early 1990s and another in 2000–2002. During the winter and spring of 2005, the water tanks were replaced and the air tanks (added in 1976) were moved to a concealed location.

Throughout its career at the zoo, the locomotive has worn many liveries with varying shades of green, red, and black. While a rod was being repaired in 2022, the locomotive was given its current scheme of black and bright red. The European pilot was reintroduced, and the dual headlights were simplified into one.

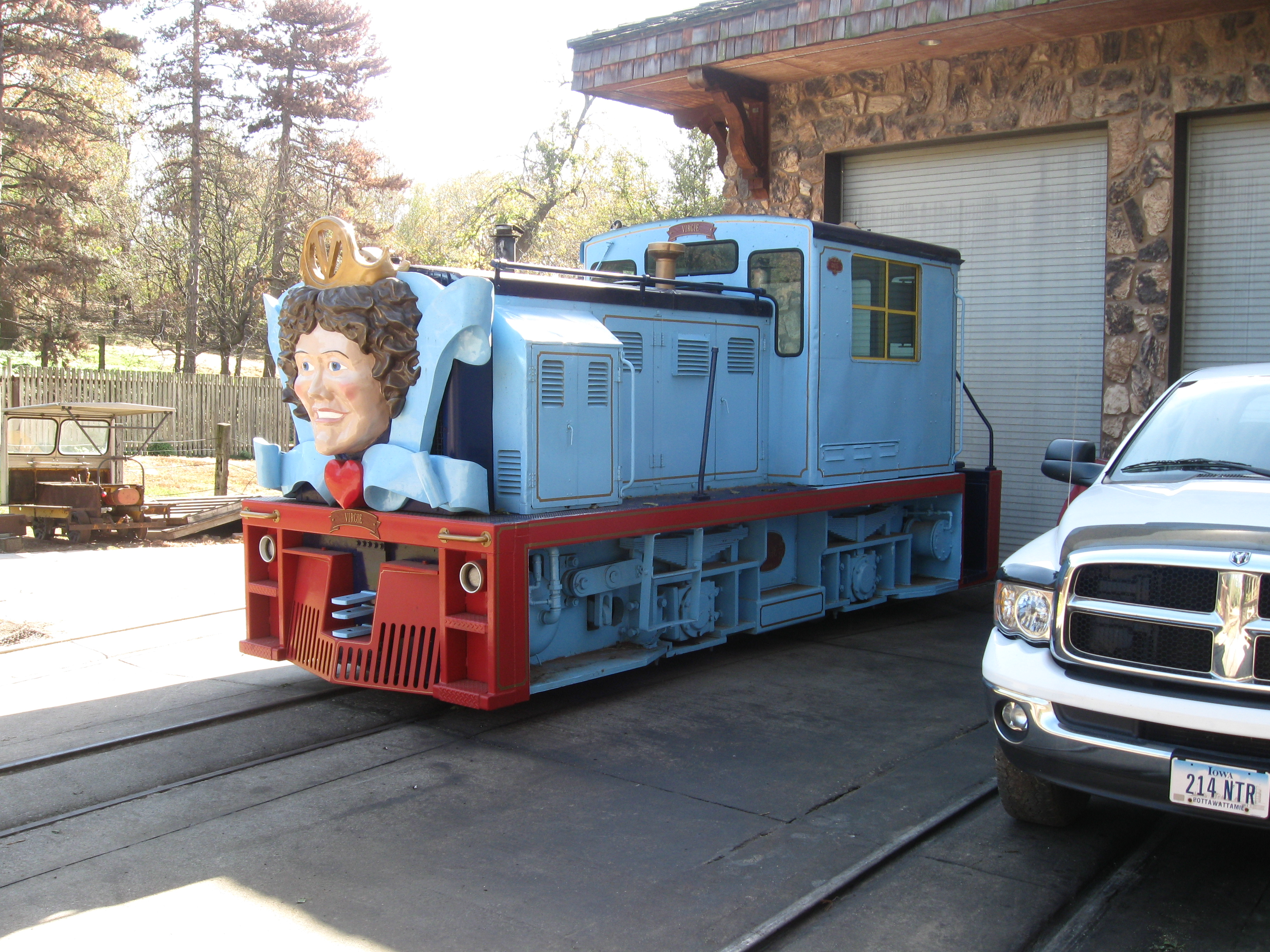
Diesel locomotive Virgie

Virgie, number 6035, is the zoo's first and only diesel locomotive. It is a four-wheeled, 40-ton diesel switcher locomotive built by Plymouth in 1957. Unlike 119 and 104, this locomotive was originally built for 36" track and later re-gauged to 30". When the engine arrived at the zoo in 2008, it was painted light blue and featured a likeness of a woman's face (presumably that of its previous owner's wife). The zoo has since removed the face and reimagined it in a striking red color. Virgie entered service in 2009. Currently, the diesel is deemed underpowered and has difficulty at certain points on the line. There are no current plans for passenger service, and thus it mainly acts as a switcher for the coaches.

== See also ==
- Transportation in Omaha
- Disneyland Railroad
- Walt Disney World Railroad
