= Virginia and Truckee 18 Dayton =

Preserved 4-4-0 steam locomotive

Dayton
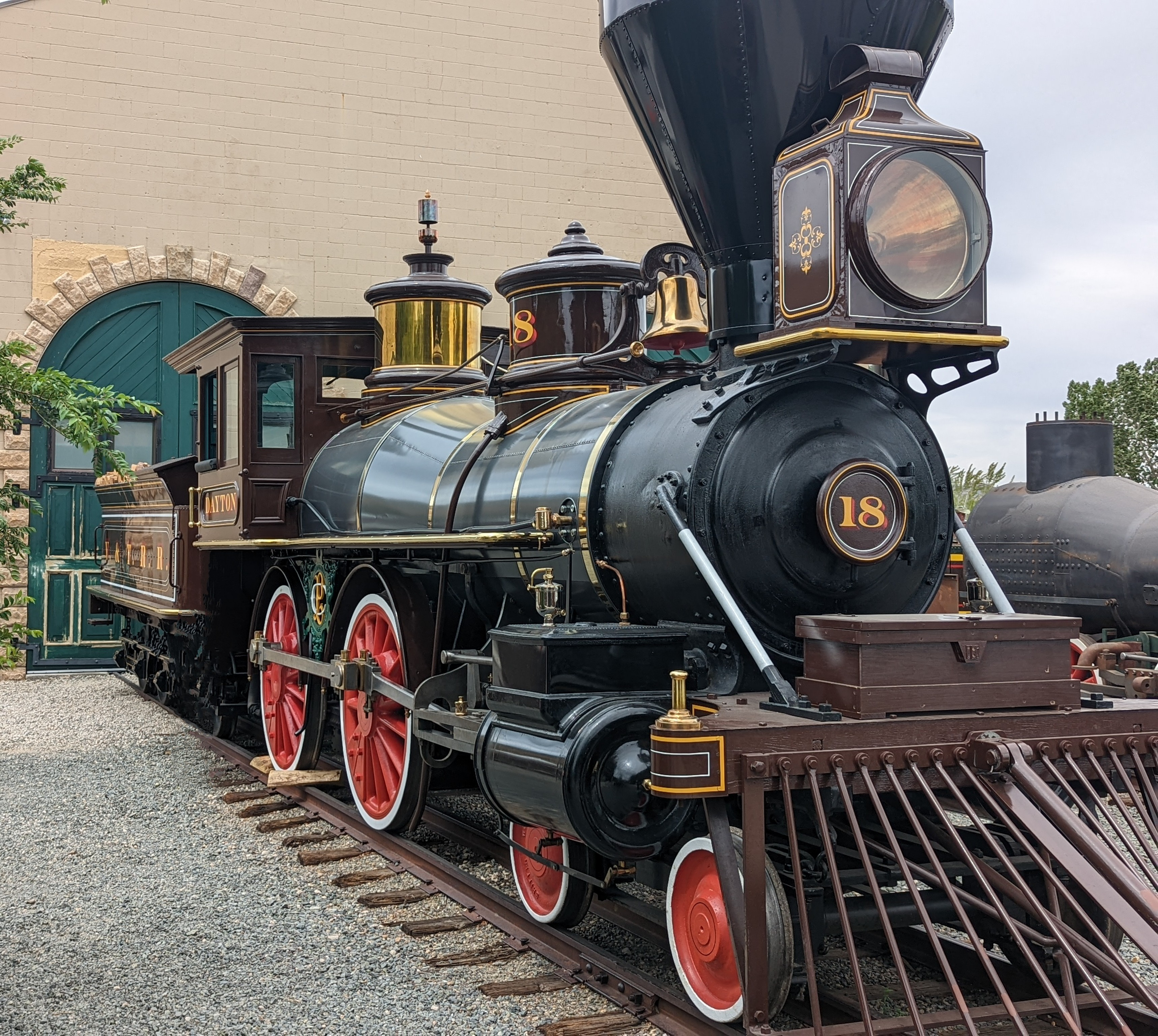
Type and origin
- Power type: Steam
- Builder: Central Pacific Railroad's Sacramento Shops
- Serial number: 6
- Build date: September 1873
Specifications
- Configuration
  - Whyte: 4-4-0
- Gauge: 4 ft 8 1/2 in (1,435 mm)
- Driver dia.: 60 in (1,524 mm)
- Loco weight: 78 short tons (70.8 t)
- Fuel type: Wood
- Boiler pressure: 130 psi (0.90 MPa)
- Cylinders: Two, outside
- Cylinder size: 17 in × 24 in (430 mm × 610 mm)
- Valve gear: Stephenson
- Valve type: Side valve
- Loco brake: Steam
- Train brakes: Steam
- Couplers: Knuckle
Performance figures
- Tractive effort: 12,716 lbf (56.56 kN)
Career
- Operators: Virginia and Truckee Railroad
- Numbers: VT 18
- Official name: Dayton
- Retired: 1937
- Current owner: Nevada State Railroad Museum
- Disposition: On static display
U.S. National Register of Historic Places
- Official name: Virginia and Truckee RR. Engines No. 18, The Dayton; and No. 22, The Inyo
- Designated: December 18, 1973
- Reference no.: 73002245

The Virginia and Truckee 18 Dayton is a 4-4-0 "American" type steam locomotive built in September 1873 by the Central Pacific Railroad's Sacramento Shops, it is on display in Sacramento, California. It spent its working career on the Virginia and Truckee Railroad.

The locomotive was placed on the National Register of Historic Places, along with the Inyo, because of their association with the Virginia and Truckee Railroad and transportation development in Nevada.

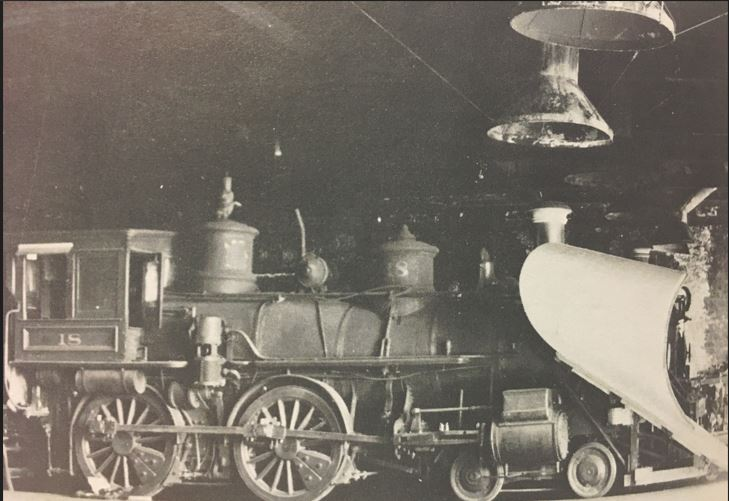
Virginia & Truckee RR 18, Dayton, in the Carson City engine house, outfitted with a snowplow.

The Dayton, a 4-4-0 "American", was built in 1873 by the Central Pacific Railroad, in Sacramento, California, and was based on the design of the CP's 173 engine. H.M Yerington, the Superintendent of the V&T at this time, ordered The Dayton after seeing the performance of another CP locomotive, #117 Gazelle, that the V&T rented from CP during a power crunch. The locomotive weighs 78,000 pounds (35,000 kg), has 60 inches (150 cm) driving wheels, and carried 2,500 US gallons (9,500 L; 2,100 imp gal) of water and 3 cords of wood. A large snow plow was fixed to the front of the locomotive in 1879, and it performed snow clearing duties on the Virginia & Truckee lines during the winters for most of its operational life, in addition to its normal passenger hauling duties.

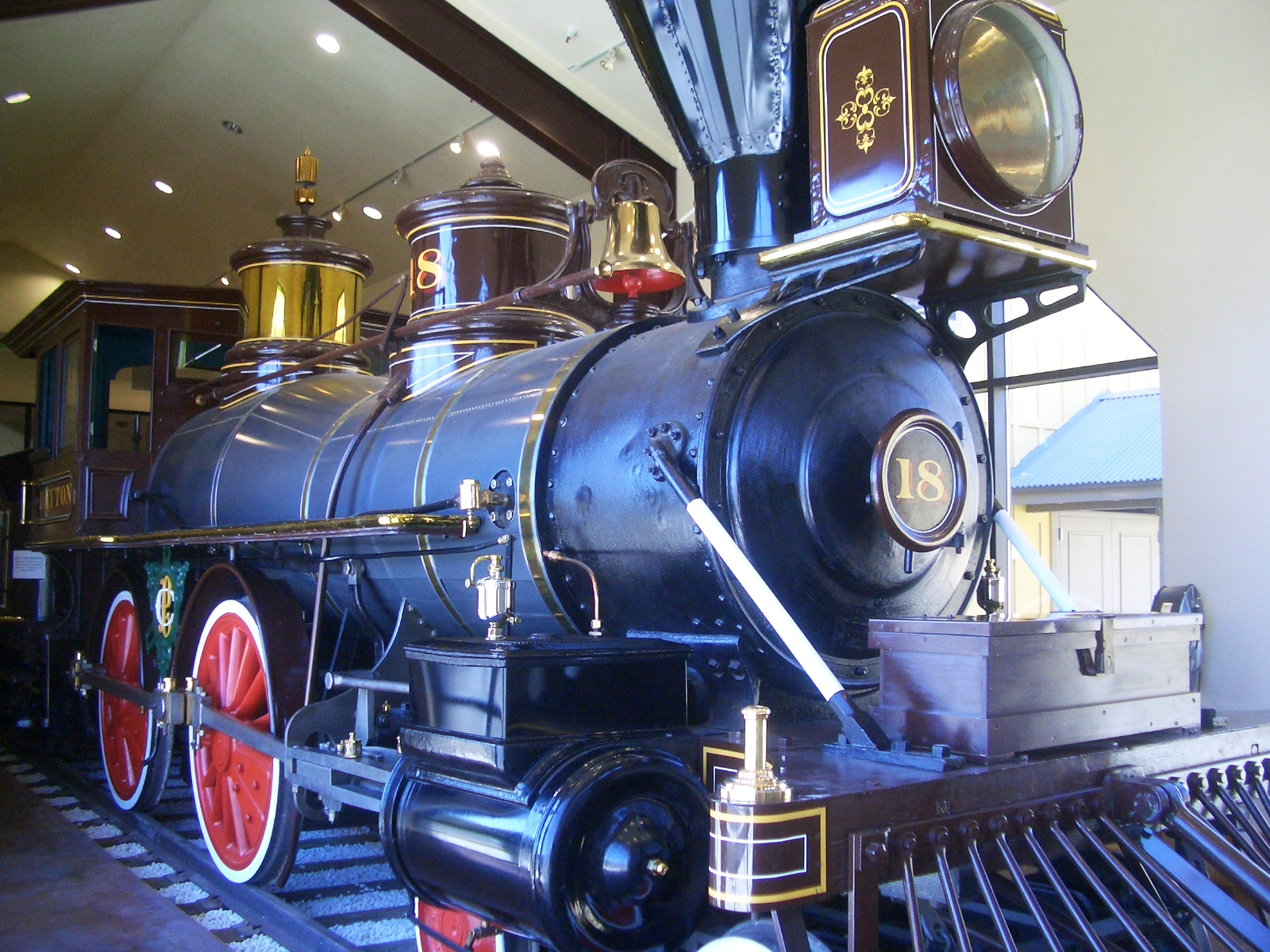
The Dayton at the Comstock History Center in Virginia City

In 1906, the locomotive had the honor of opening the branch line between Carson City and Minden, Nevada, but after that it was used less frequently. In 1908 it was converted to burn oil rather than wood. In 1937, in one of its last acts on the V&T, The Dayton was plowing snow in Washoe Valley, near Franktown, when it derailed. The V&T being financially unhealthy at this time, simply got Dayton out of the way and left her until the snow melted in the spring. In 1937, the locomotive, minus the plow, was sold for $1,000 together with No. 22 Inyo to Paramount Pictures who then had the locomotive overhauled at the Southern Pacific Railroad shops in Sparks, Nevada. Paramount had the locomotive repainted and renumbered for use in motion pictures.

== The Dayton film history ==
The Dayton appeared in several movies, beginning with Union Pacific. It traveled to New York City in 1939 to promote this film. Other movies featuring the Dayton include Young Tom Edison, The Harvey Girls and Duel in the Sun.

== Post-retirement ==
In 1938, the locomotive was sold to Paramount Pictures and in 1939 was double-headed with the UP GE Steam turbine locomotives as locomotive number 58 for the Cecil B. DeMille's Union Pacific film of that same year. In 1969, the locomotive participated in ceremonies for the centennial of the Golden Spike. Dayton was modified to represent Union Pacific's No. 119. It remained at the Golden Spike National Historic Site throughout most of the 1970s, along with the V&T's Inyo, which was modified to represent the Central Pacific's Jupiter. In 1974, both locomotives were sold to the State of Nevada, but remained in Utah while brand-new replicas of the Golden Spike locomotives were under construction. Both Inyo and Dayton finally arrived at the Nevada State Railroad Museum in Carson City in late 1978.

Once at the museum, the Inyo and Dayton were evaluated for possible restoration to operating condition. The boiler of the latter was found to be made of wrought iron and dangerous to operate. Instead, it was decided to instead give the engine a cosmetic restoration. Dayton made its debut at the museum on Memorial Day weekend, 1982.

In 2005, the Dayton was moved to the Comstock History Center in Virginia City, Nevada, where it was displayed until April 2018. It was then returned to the Nevada State Railroad Museum in exchange for Virginia and Truckee 4-6-0 No. 27, which took the Dayton's place on exhibit at the Comstock History Center. In July, 2022, the engine was loaned to the California State Railroad Museum for a period of two years, during which time the Genoa and the J.W. Bowker will take the Dayton's place in Carson City.
