= Virginia and Truckee 22 Inyo =

Steam locomotive

Inyo
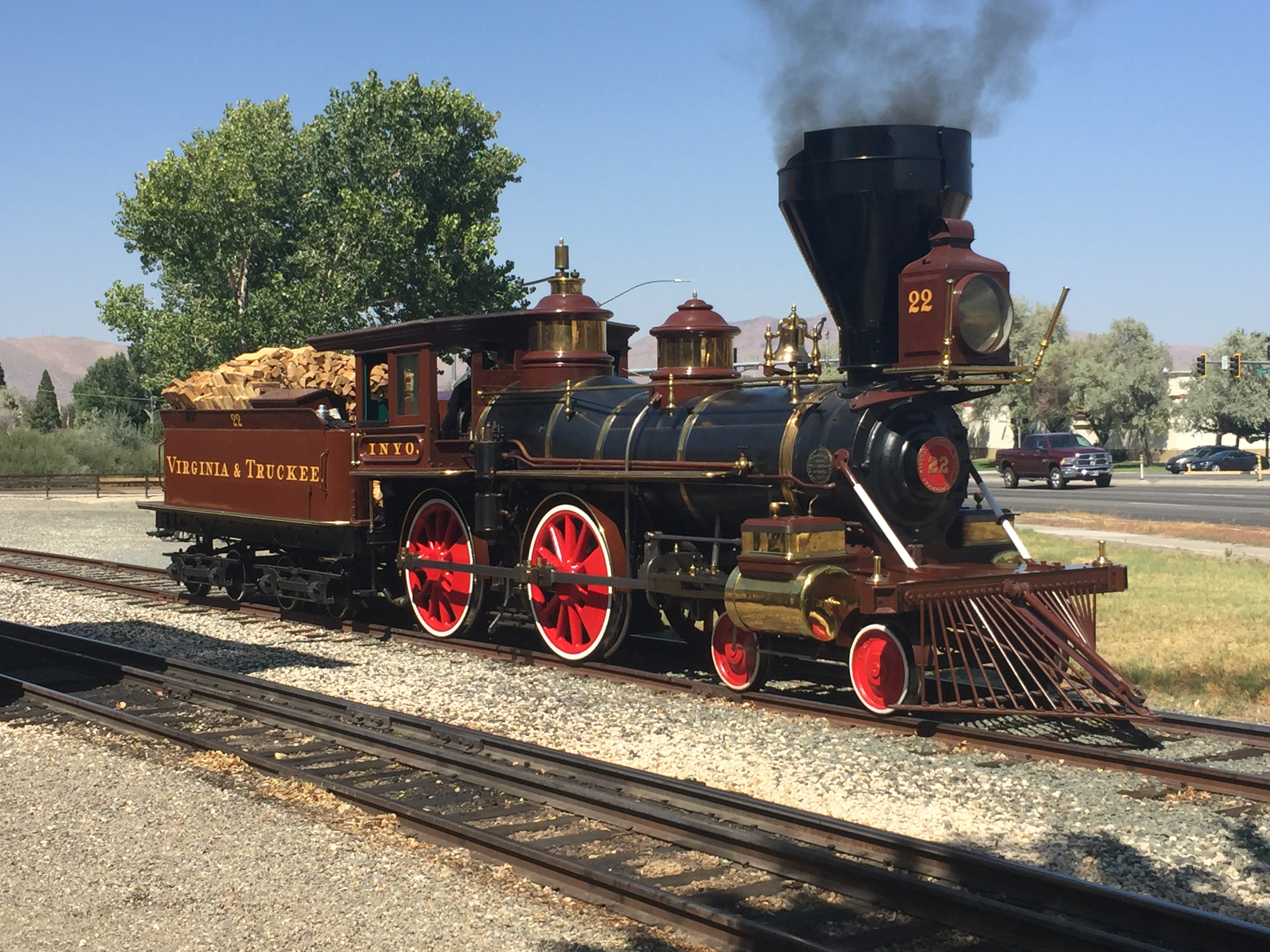
- The Inyo at the Carson City NSRM branch in 2018
Type and origin
- Power type: Steam
- Builder: Baldwin Locomotive Works
- Serial number: 3693
- Model: 8-26 C
- Build date: February 1875
Specifications
- Configuration
  - Whyte: 4-4-0
- Gauge: 4 ft 8 1/2 in (1,435 mm)
- Driver dia.: 57 in (1,448 mm)
- Loco weight: 68 short tons (61.7 t)
- Fuel type: New: Wood; 1910-1981: Oil; Now: Wood
- Boiler pressure: New: 130 psi (0.90 MPa); Now: 75 psi (0.52 MPa)
- Cylinders: Two, outside
- Cylinder size: 16 in × 24 in (410 mm × 610 mm)
- Valve gear: Stephenson
- Valve type: Side valve
- Loco brake: Air
- Train brakes: Air
- Couplers: Knuckle
Performance figures
- Tractive effort: 6,870 lbf (30.56 kN)
Career
- Operators: Virginia and Truckee Railroad
- Numbers: VT 22
- Official name: Inyo
- Retired: September 9, 1926
- Restored: May 29, 1983
- Current owner: Nevada State Railroad Museum
- Disposition: Operational
U.S. National Register of Historic Places
- Official name: Virginia and Truckee RR. Engines No. 18, The Dayton; and No. 22, The Inyo
- Designated: December 18, 1973
- Reference no.: 73002245

Virginia and Truckee Railroad 22, also known as the "Inyo", is a 4-4-0 "American" type steam locomotive that was built by the Baldwin Locomotive Works in 1875 and pulled both passenger and freight trains. The Inyo weighs 68,000 lb (31,000 kg). Its 57 in (140 cm) driving wheels deliver 11,920 lb (5,410 kg) of tractive force. In 1877 it was fitted with air brakes and in 1910 it was converted to burn oil rather than wood.

Inyo was retired on September 9, 1926. It was kept in generally working order, to provide a source of spare parts for another V&T locomotive, the Reno.

It was sold to Paramount Pictures in March 1937 for $1,250 (equivalent to $27,995 in 2025). Though not rebuilt by the studio as was the Dayton (another V&T locomotive also purchased by the studio at the time), the engine was repainted and renumbered for use in motion pictures.

In 1969 the locomotive participated in ceremonies for the centennial of the Golden Spike. Inyo was decorated to look like the Central Pacific's Jupiter. It remained at the Golden Spike National Historic Site throughout most of the 1970s. In 1974 the locomotive was sold to the State of Nevada, but it remained in Utah while a brand-new replica locomotive was built to replace it. Inyo finally arrived at the Nevada State Railroad Museum in Carson City in late 1978.

An assessment of the locomotive showed that the Inyo was in good shape, and it was chosen for a full restoration to steam operation. Inyo was completed the next year, debuting on May 29, 1983.

In May 1986, Inyo traveled to Vancouver British Columbia to participate at SteamExpo 86 along with MacMillan Bloedel & Powell River Ltd. 1077, Canadian Pacific 374, Canadian Pacific 3, ERM&L Co. 1 Falk, Dunrobin (2nd), PL Co. 12, Great Western 51, AP 2, Canadian National 1392, Union Pacific 4466, Elk River Railroad 1, Quincy Railroad 2, Tom Thumb (1927 Replica), Best Friend of Charleston (1928 Replica), Mount Ranier Railroad 91, John Bull (1939 Replica), Canadian Pacific 2860, Canadian Pacific 1201, Canadian National 6060, John Molson (1970 Replica), and Stephenson's Rocket (1979 Replica).

The Inyo remains in Carson City, where it steams up and runs around the museum's track on selected dates, most notably July 4 every year. It was brought to Las Vegas for the month of April 1984 to mark the grand opening of the railroad-themed Palace Station casino.

== Film history ==
The Inyo starred in High, Wide, and Handsome in 1937, followed by roles in Bad Little Angel,Union Pacific, Red River and as the Texas and William R. Smith in Disney's The Great Locomotive Chase in 1956. In 1962 it played the Southern Pacific #9 in the John Wayne feature McLintock!. It was featured in the 1960s television series The Wild Wild West wearing both the number 8 and 22. In all, the locomotive appeared in over 20 film productions.
