= Chadwell O'Connor =

American inventor and steam engine enthusiast

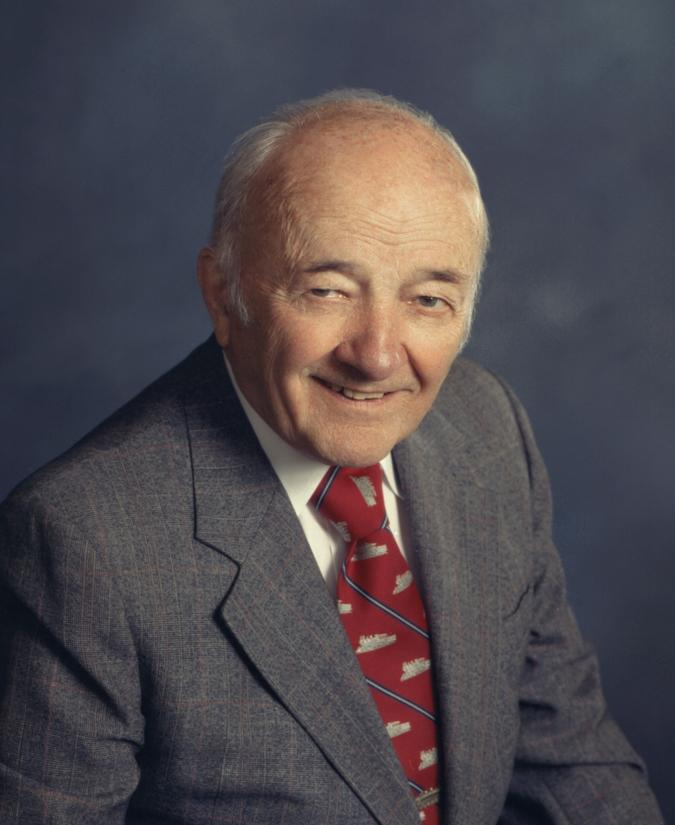
Chadwell O'Connor

Chadwell O'Connor (October 9, 1914 – September 5, 2007) was an American inventor and steam engine enthusiast. He is most remembered as the inventor of an improved fluid-damped tripod head, for which he won Academy Awards in 1975 and 1992.

== Early life and education ==
Chadwell O'Connor came from a distinguished family. His father, Johnson O'Connor was a well-known psychometrician and pioneer in the study of aptitude testing. His mother died when he was young and his father remarried the MIT-trained architect and educator Eleanor Manning. The family lived in Boston and O'Connor often accompanied his father to his work at the General Electric factory in Lynn, Massachusetts where he acquired an interest in engineering. O'Connor attended the Stevens Institute of Technology and California Institute of Technology where he earned a degree in mechanical engineering. Shortly after graduating, World War II broke out and O'Connor joined Douglas Aircraft where he was in charge of expediting aircraft production and repair, a vital part of the war effort.

== Steam enthusiast ==
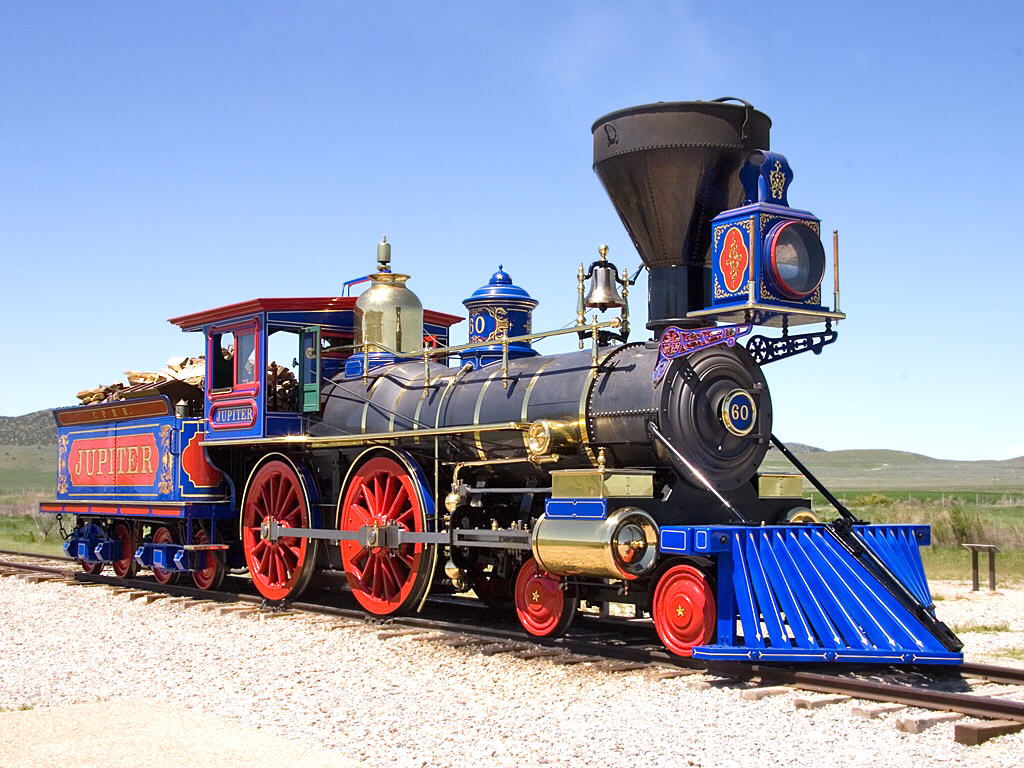
Reproduction of Central Pacific No. 60 Jupiter

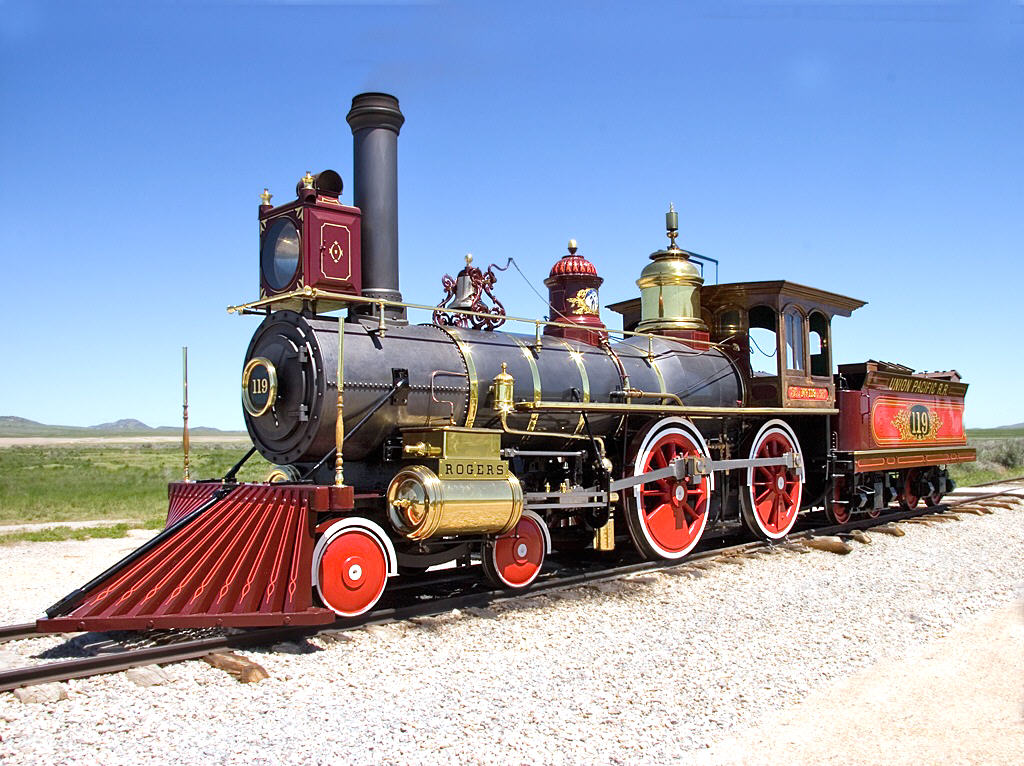
Reproduction of Union Pacific No. 119

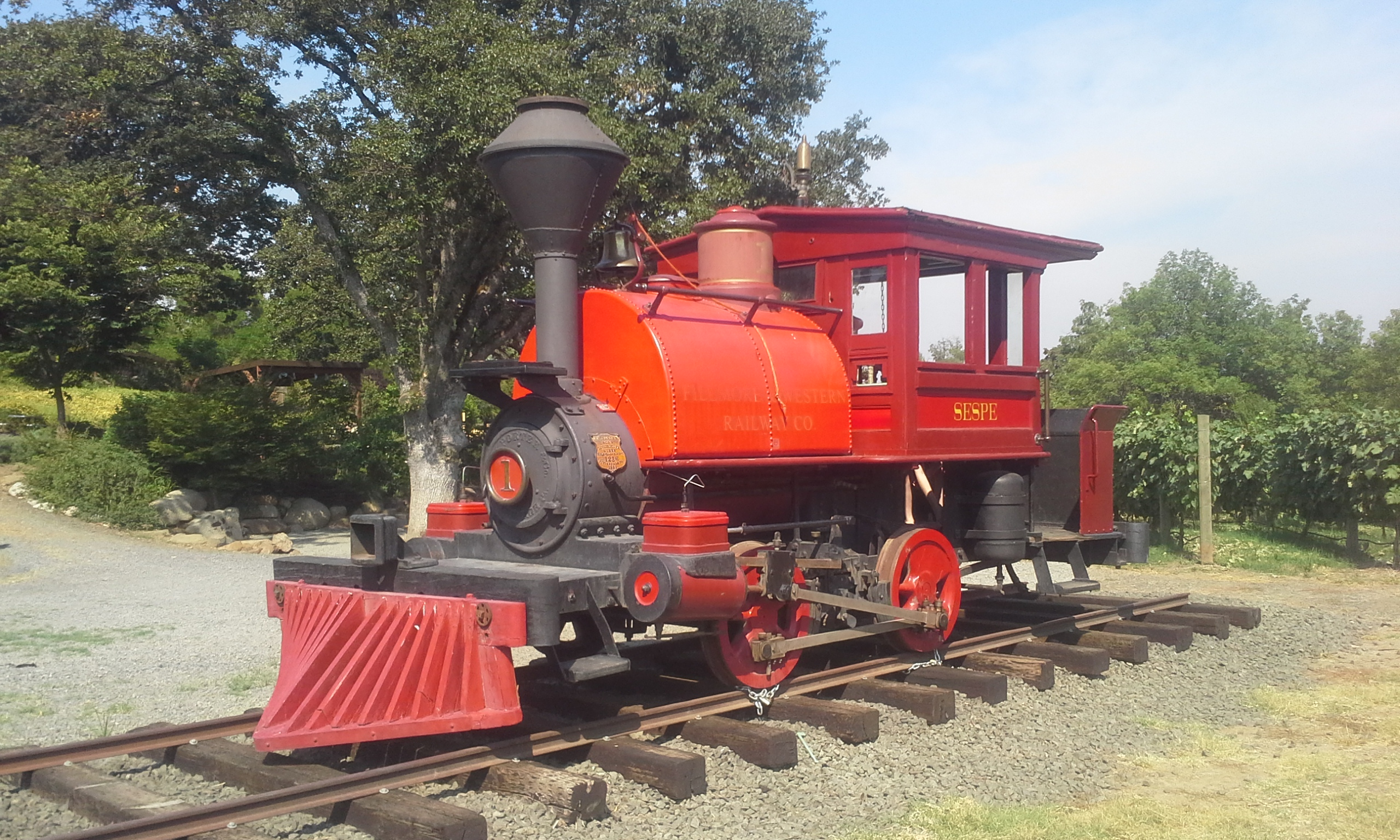
The locomotive that Chadwell owned. It is now on display in Jacksonville Oregon.

After the war, O'Connor joined Pasadena Power and Light as chief engineer. O'Connor had been interested in steam engines since he was a boy and he applied this knowledge at the power company to improve power production and incineration. In 1974, he used this experience to develop the O'Connor Rotary Combustor that burned municipal garbage to create steam for power generation. The first pilot plant was built in Japan, and in 1980 a production facility was built in Gallatin, Tennessee, that burned 200 short tons (179 long tons; 181 t) a day of municipal waste. This technology was spun out of O'Connor's company, O'Connor Engineering, to a separate company that was later purchased by Westinghouse.

O'Connor had long been fascinated with steam locomotives which he recognized were a dying breed and began photographing them. He later became involved in the refurbishment and reproduction of classic steam locomotives, and owned a 1891 0-4-0 locomotive from 1952-1967. He and his company, O'Connor Engineering Laboratories, recreated the drawings and reproduced copies of the Union Pacific No. 119 and Central Pacific Jupiter locomotives that met for the driving of the Golden spike at Promontory Summit, Utah. These reproductions are used in recreations of the event and have been operating at the Golden Spike National Historic Site since 10 May 1979. Disney animator and steam-engine-owner Ward Kimball painted the artwork on the No. 119. In later years, O'Connor maintained his own steamboat which he would fire up and tool around the harbor in Newport Beach, California.

In the 1990s the O'Connors donated one of their steam engines to the Minnesota Transportation Museum for the restoration of the streetcar steamboat Minnehaha. Minnehaha was brought back into service as a working museum in 1996. Through the O'Connors' generosity people are still able to experience a historic steamboat cruise on Lake Minnetonka, Minnesota, where they can learn about and see a working steam engine.

== The fluid head ==
O'Connor's fascination with photographing steam locomotives led to his best known invention, an improved tripod fluid head with counterbalance and adjustable drag. As he tried photographing moving trains, he became annoyed by the jerkiness of the pictures. To solve this problem he developed a silicone-filled platform that interfaced between the tripod and the camera to allow smooth panning and tilting of the camera. He still viewed this as a hobby and shot more than 100,000 feet of film on the waning days of steam locomotives. One day in 1952, while filming near Glendale, California, he met Walt Disney, who was also a steam enthusiast. Disney was so impressed with the tripod head that he asked if O'Connor could make more for him. O'Connor agreed but said it would take time as he built them in his garage.

At the time, Disney was shooting one of his first nature studies, The Living Desert, and needed a way to shoot moving animals smoothly. The O'Connor head was so successful that Disney immediately ordered 10 more. This film won the first Academy Award for Documentary Feature in 1953. O'Connor founded a part-time business in 1952 to make the heads and by 1969 it was so successful that he left the power company to work full-time on camera heads and steam engines at O'Connor Engineering. O'Connor and Disney maintained a lifelong friendship and business relationship. O'Connor designed the power systems for the steam launches and paddlewheelers at Disney World in Florida.

The Academy of Motion Picture Arts and Sciences presented O'Connor with a Scientific and Engineering Award (Class II) in 1975 and an Award of Merit in 1992 for the concept and engineering of a fluid-damped camera-head for motion picture photography. In his lifetime, O'Connor received 29 U.S. patents.

== Death ==
Chadwell O’Connor died on September 5, 2007.

== See also ==
- Eric Miller, Fluid Head Inventor & Patent Holder
- Rail transport in Walt Disney Parks and Resorts
- Roger E. Broggie
