= Eleanor Norcross =

American painter (1854–1923)

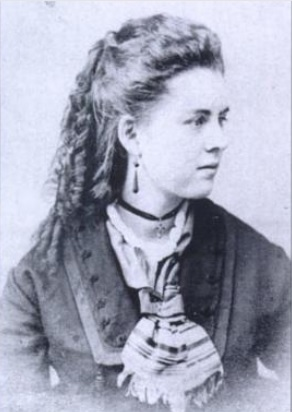
- Born: Ella Augusta Norcross; June 24, 1854; Fitchburg, Massachusetts, US
- Died: October 19, 1923 (aged 69); Fitchburg, Massachusetts, US
- Education: Massachusetts Normal Art School; William Merritt Chase; Alfred Stevens
- Known for: Establishing Fitchburg Art Museum
- Notable work: My Studio
- Movement: Impressionism

Ella Augusta "Eleanor" Norcross (June 24, 1854 – October 19, 1923) was an American painter who studied under William Merritt Chase and Alfred Stevens. She lived the majority of her adult life in Paris, France, as an artist and collector and spent the summers in her hometown of Fitchburg, Massachusetts. Norcross painted Impressionist portraits and still lifes, and is better known for her paintings of genteel interiors.

Her father provided her a comfortable living, under the proviso that she would not sell her paintings. With a life mission to provide people from her hometown the ability to view great works of art, Norcross collected art, made copies of paintings of Old Masters, and systematically documented decorative arts from the 12th through the 19th century. Her funding and art collection were used to establish the Fitchburg Art Museum.

In 1924, her works were shown posthumously in Paris at the Louvre and Salon d'Automne, where Norcross was the first American to have had a retrospective. Her works were also shown the following year at the Museum of Fine Arts, Boston.

== Early life ==
Ella Augusta Norcross was born on June 24, 1854, in Fitchburg, Massachusetts, (Note: She was raised in two houses on Fitchburg's Main Street. One no longer stands and the other is on upper Main Street, across from Upper Common.) about 50 miles (80 km) west of Boston, to Amasa Norcross and Susan Augusta Norcross. Her father was an attorney, Fitchburg's first mayor, state senator, and United States representative. Her mother, Susan, had been a school teacher in the Fitchburg area and during the Civil War was a leader of the Ladies' Soldiers Aid Society, which provided clothing, blankets, and other supplies to soldiers from Fitchburg and other locations in the state of Massachusetts. In 1863, her three-year-old brother Nelson died of scarlet fever, and when she was 14, her mother died of consumption. Norcross and her father, the remaining household members, had a close relationship.

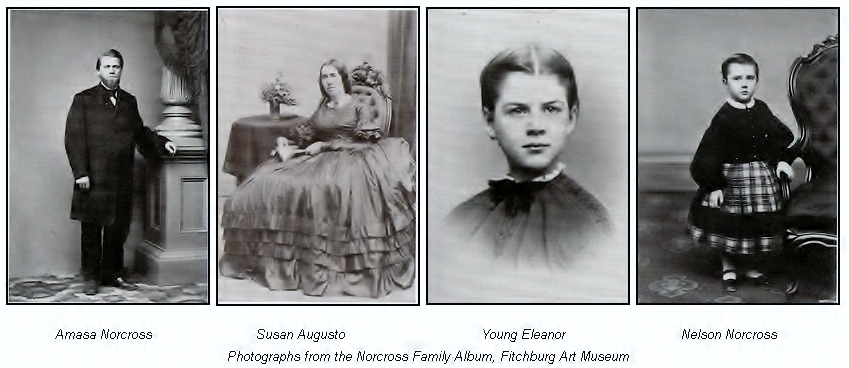

Norcross was afforded a privileged education that was not available to many young ladies of her generation. At 16 years of age, she graduated from Fitchburg High School, and, beginning in 1870, she attended Wheaton Female Seminary, now Wheaton College. When she was 16 and 17 years old she wrote essays for Rushlight, the school's literary journal. The nature of her essays provide insight into the woman she would become: one who would successfully operate in a male-oriented society, had an interest in bettering the plight of others, and appreciated historical things. She graduated in 1872. Frances Vose Emerson was a classmate at Wheaton, good friend from childhood, and ultimately a trustee for the Fitchburg Art Museum. (Note: Frances Vose Emerson (1855–1950) was a teacher and later trustee of Wheaton College for a total of about 24 years. She also owned and ran the Home and Day School for Girls in Boston.)

== Education and early career ==
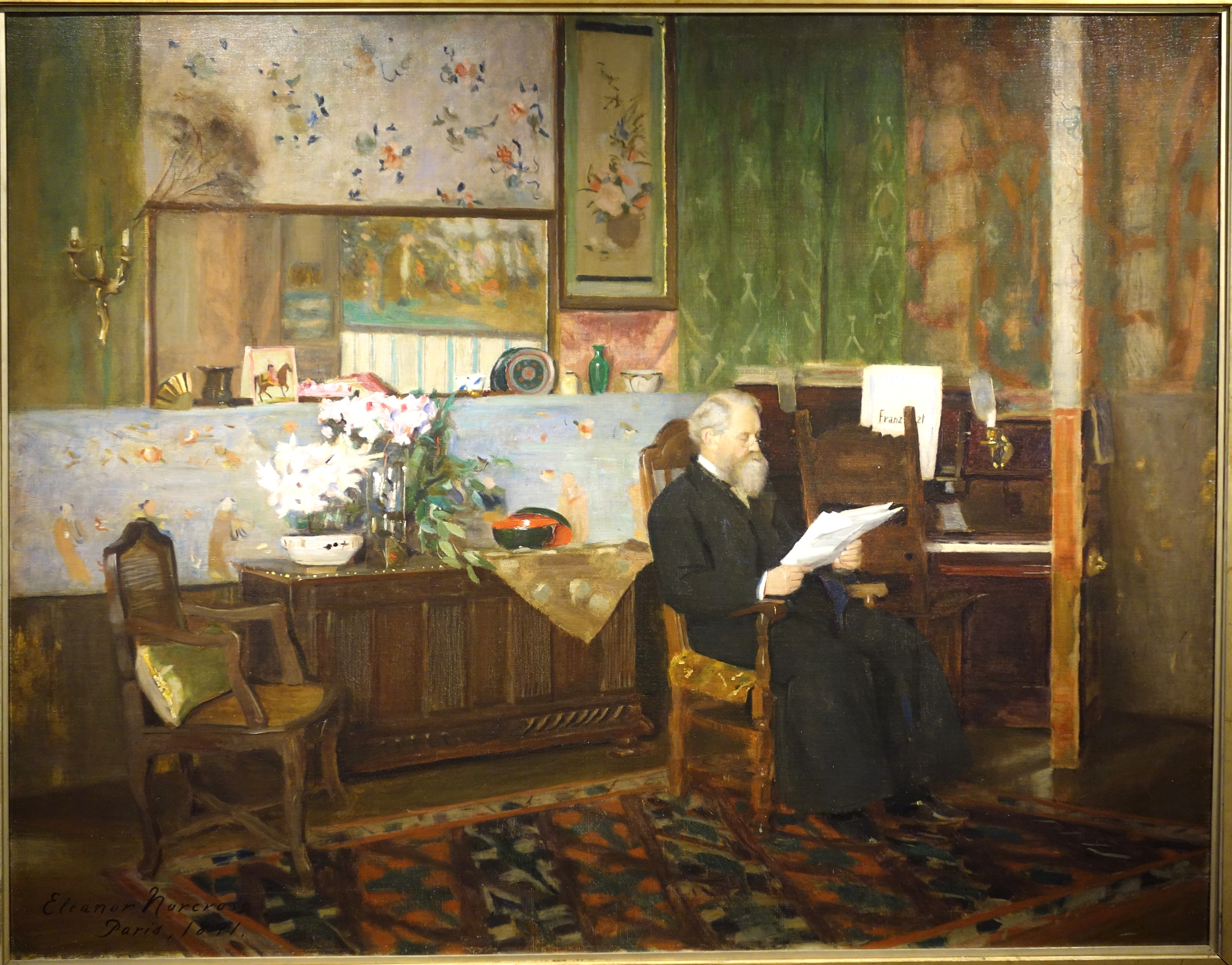
My Studio, 1891, oil on canvas, Fitchburg Art Museum, Massachusetts

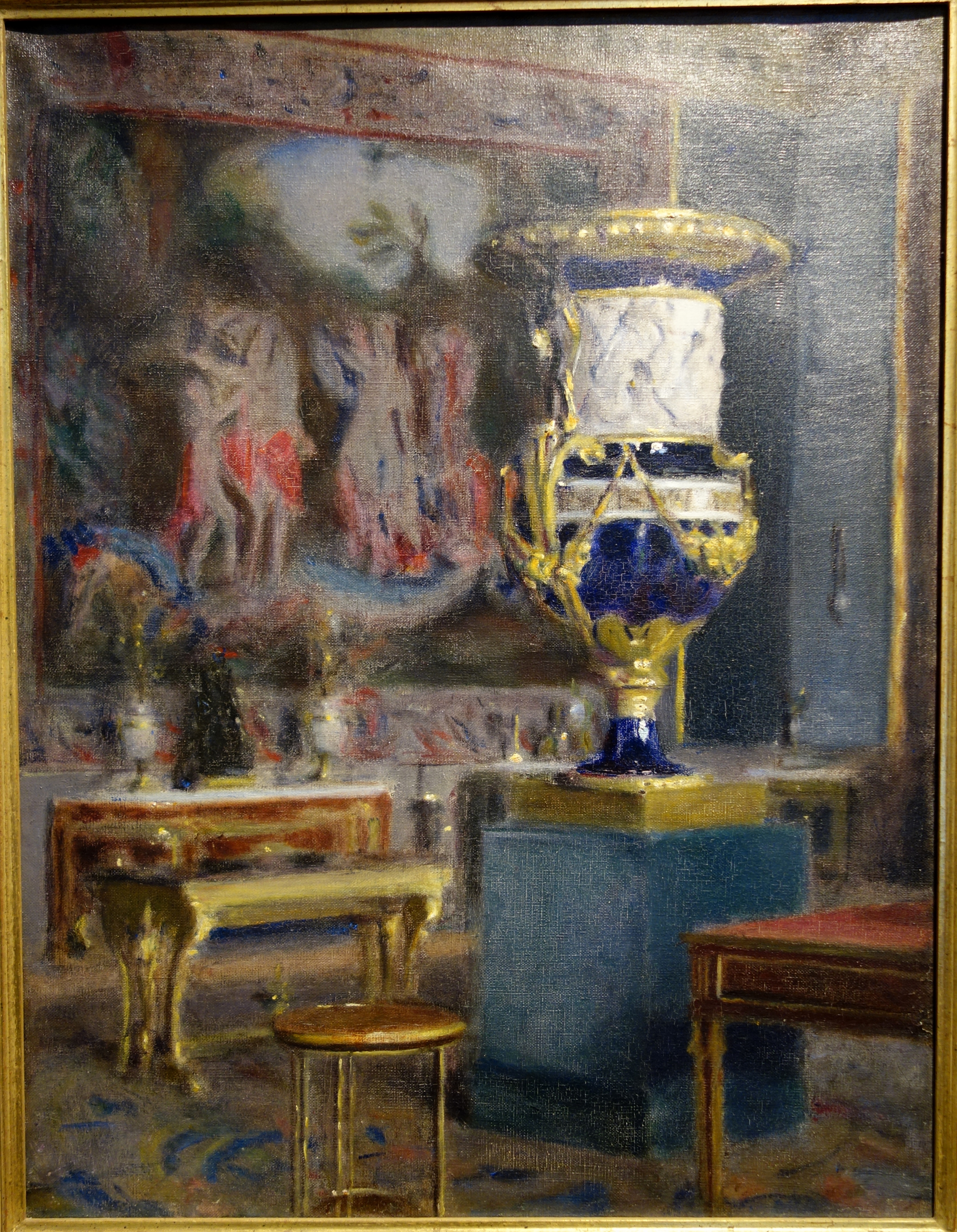
Tapestry, oil on canvas, Fitchburg Art Museum

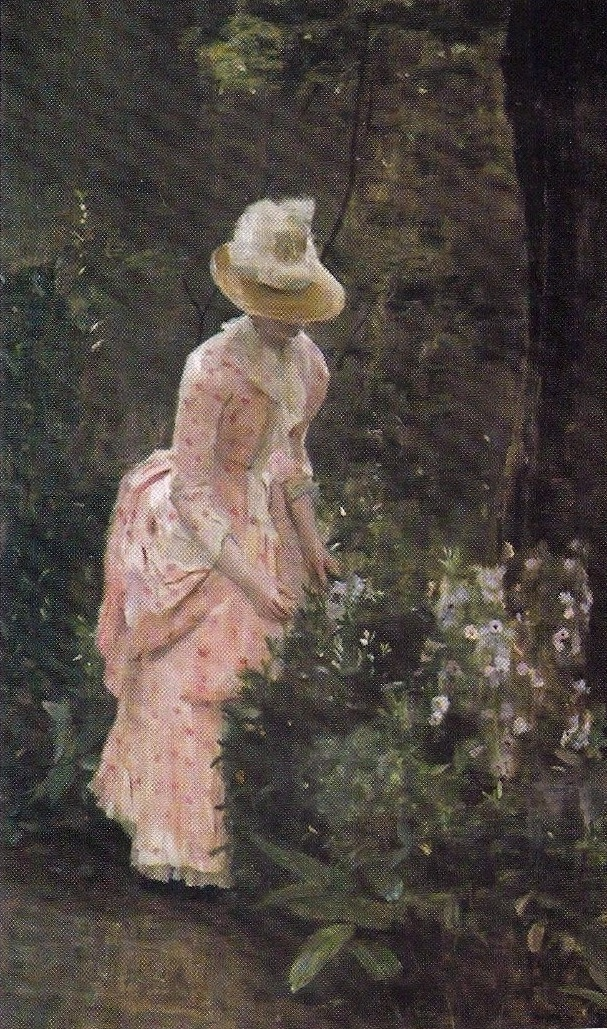
Woman in a [Paris] Garden, Fitchburg Art Museum

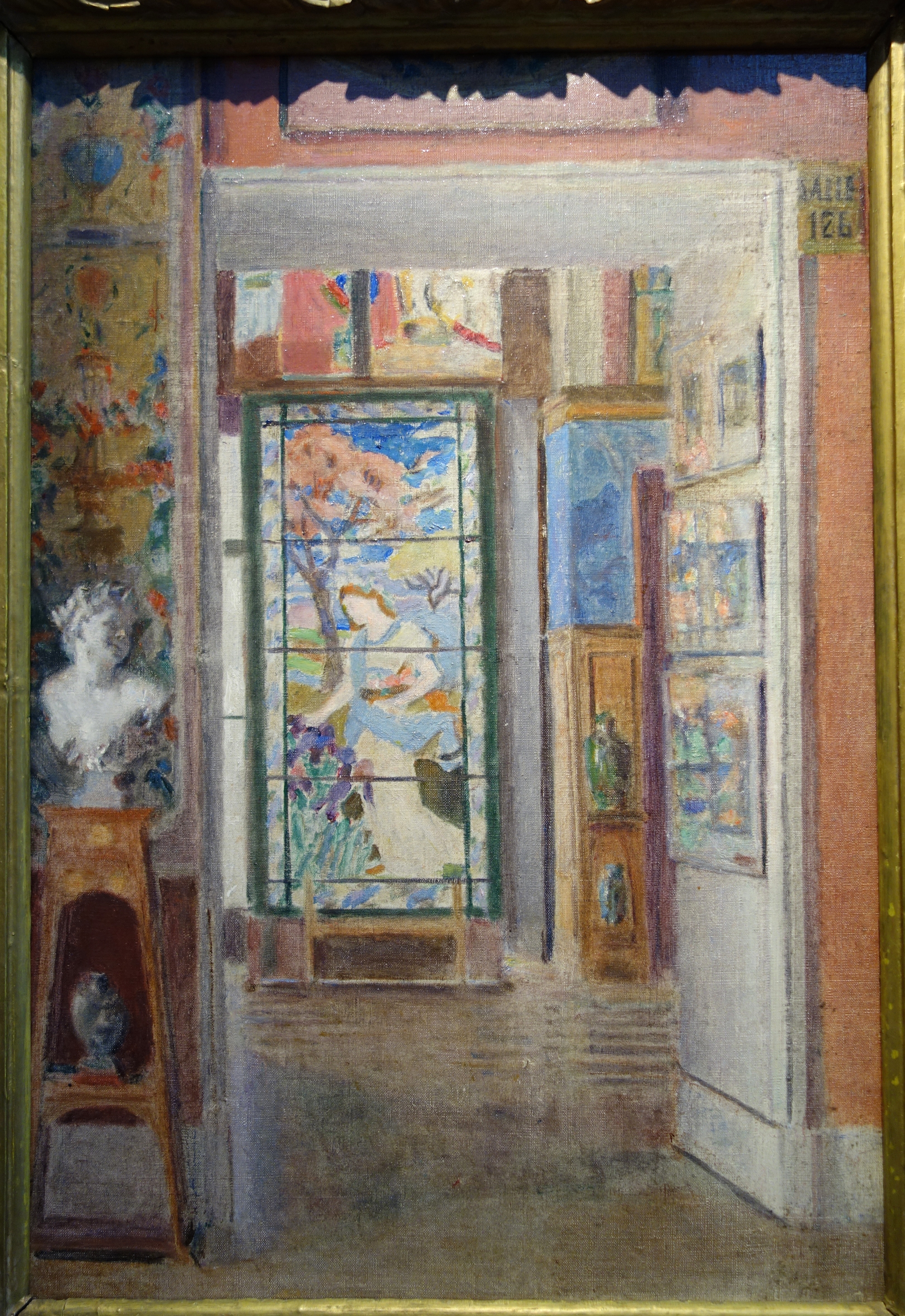
Carpeaux Sevres (also known as Arte Moderne), oil on canvas, Fitchburg Art Museum

Norcross studied at Boston's Massachusetts Normal Art School, now the Massachusetts College of Art and Design, to prepare to teach art. Living in Fitchburg, she commuted by train to the school in Boston. Norcross earned her teaching certificate by 1876 and taught drawing in the Fitchburg schools for a year. Norcross moved with her father to Washington when he was elected to the House of Representatives. A "witty and lively conversationalist", she acted as his hostess in the capital and beginning in 1878, Norcross studied art in New York City under William Merritt Chase at the Art Students League of New York for up to five years. In June 1883, she sailed for Paris to study with Alfred Stevens at Chase's suggestion. She and a few other women studied with the Belgian artist during the winters of 1883 and 1884.

== Career ==
=== Father's influence ===
Her father provided financial support that allowed Norcross to live comfortably. She exhibited her works in salons, according to the agreement with her father that she would not sell any of them; he believed that women should give their works away and not enter into the male-oriented business world. Any paintings that she wanted to give away, Mr. Norcross offered to have "handsomely framed".

She lived in Paris for 40 years, and traveled throughout Europe. Her father lived with her during the winters after his retirement and until 1898, when he died. Joined by his daughter, Amasa Norcross spent his summers in Fitchburg.

=== Style and paintings ===
Norcross painted portraits and still lifes, and she made copies of Old Masters. Her portraits and later interiors (Note: Édouard Vuillard may have influenced Norcross's interiors, according to Traute M. Marshall, author of Art Museums Plus.) were executed with "delicate brush strokes". She had an adept sense of color and the ability to portray reflections and textures, like metal's gleam, satin's sheen, and velvet's texture. The compositions of her interiors are positioned in a way that leads the viewer to consider what might be through a door or around a corner, as in Carpeaux Sevres.

Her painting, Woman in a Garden, reflects influences of Chase, Monet and French Impressionism combined with the skill to draw with a paintbrush learned from Alfred Stevens. Reminiscent of Chase's en plein air paintings, the dark background contrasts with the enigmatic, illuminated woman. My Studio (1891)—which depicts her father in a room with "elaborately patterned textiles", antique and oriental furnishings, and flowers—is "the most impressive" of her works at the Fitchburg Art Museum. It was also her image of an "ideal home". Of it, Ann H. Murray writes:

...the painting itself is reminiscent of Chase in the informality and candidness that pervade the composition. The vacant chair, the mirror reflecting spaces not directly perceivable, and the abundance of rectangular units that impose a geographic organization on the wall—all these features occur also in Chase's paintings, as well as in those of Degas and Cassatt who were, along with Monet, Renoir and Rodin, among her personal acquaintances.

She exhibited from 1887 until her death in Champ de Mars' Société Nationale des Beaux-Arts, which was made possible through her close friendship with Puvis de Chavannes. Her works were also shown in Boston and New York City. She exhibited her work at the Palace of Fine Arts at the 1893 World's Columbian Exposition in Chicago, Illinois. Norcross shared a studio with Alix d'Anethan, whose paintings, influenced by Puvis, were of pastoral and contemporary life.

Norcross began to collect historical European artwork, particularly to be shown in public places in or near her hometown. After 1905, she made copies of paintings by great artists, like Hals, Velázquez, and Botticelli. At roughly the same time, she began making paintings of French decorative art from 12th century Gothic art through the 19th century that she saw in galleries, including interior scenes of the Louvre. Norcross's interiors provided insight into European decorative arts:

Her gift was for mellow, loving, quiet observation of cozy spaces that close out the rest of the world. She wasn't merely recording decor, though. Her surfaces are loose and brushy, clearly influenced by Impressionism.

— Christine Temin, The Boston Globe

The 1914 Musée des Arts Décoratifs (in the Louvre) was to have exhibited her works, but the show was cancelled due to the commencement of World War I. She was known for being welcoming to art students from the United States and lived in the Rue de Bellchase the final 12 years of her life.

=== Collection ===
She began purchasing art objects with the intention of sending them to America, so that people that were not afforded the luxury of traveling to Europe could view good works of art. Norcross collected furniture, textiles, porcelains, and other objects during visits to quiet French villages.

Works from her collection were given to Wheaton College in 1922 during her 50th-year reunion, including an oil sketch by Alix d'Anethan and a seascape by Alfred Stevens. She loaned her paintings to the Worcester Art Museum, and the Fitchburg Public Library was a beneficiary of photographs, prints, engravings, textiles, dishes, and furniture. She was involved in the placement of art at the library so that visitors to every department would have the opportunity to view the works of art, including European prints and rare engravings that span several centuries.

== Museum ==
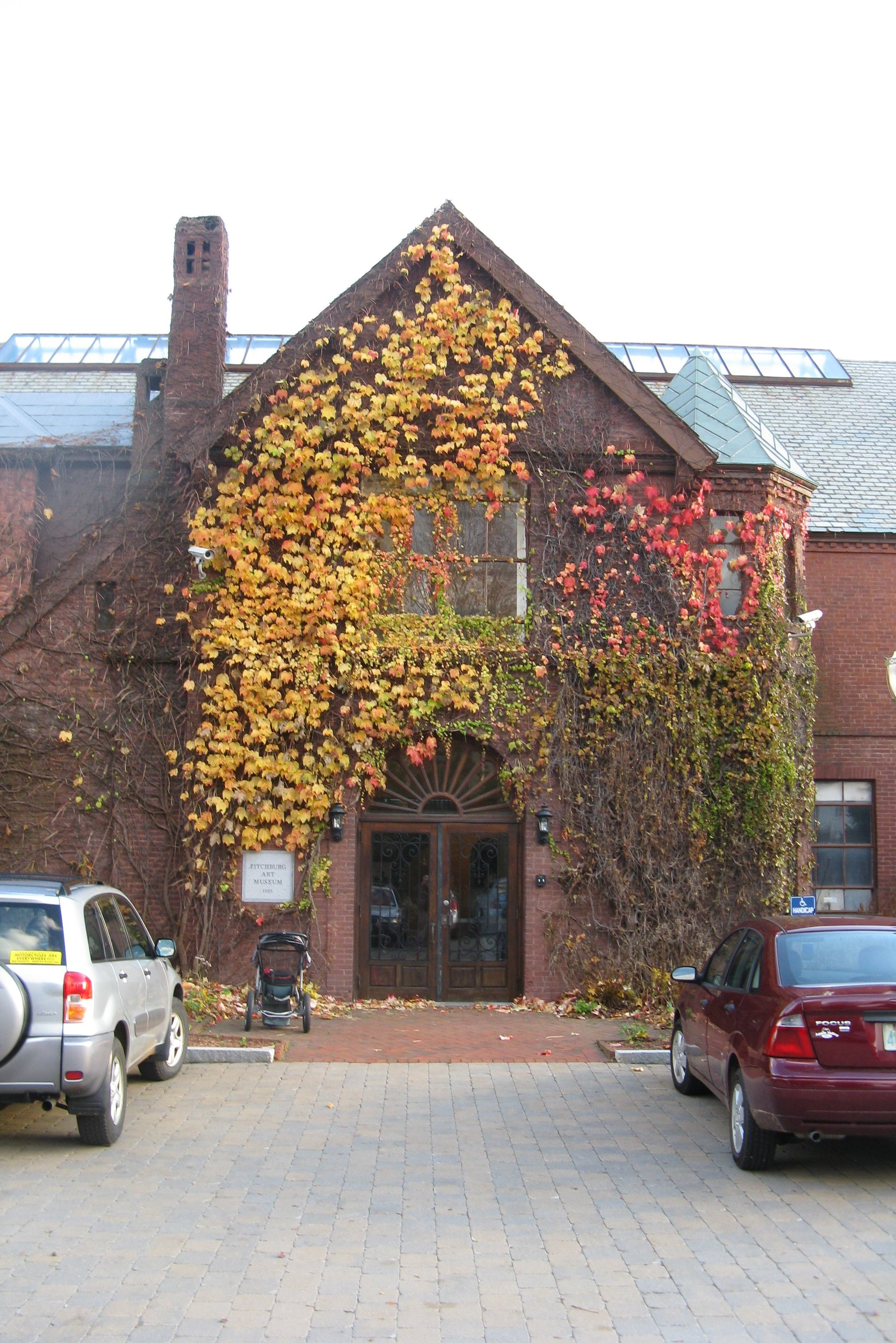
Fitchburg Art Museum

To implement her plan to establish a cultural center in Fitchburg, Norcross shipped works of art from her collection to her hometown and left $10,000 or $100,000 in her will, with the provision that the town raise an equal amount to provide a healthy endowment, otherwise the monies would go to Wheaton Seminary.

[Norcross] was an artist, collector, and philanthropist who sought to inspire, educate, and improve society through cultural enrichment in the late nineteenth and early twentieth centuries.

— Women and Museum

Friends Frances Vose Emerson and Providence art teacher Sophia Lord Pitman were identified in the will as trustees for the museum. An old brick stable was purchased in 1924 and was remodeled by Howe, Manning & Almy, Inc., a Boston firm of women architects, into a French Provincial building. In 1929, (Note: The museum is also reported to have been founded in 1925 in 1927. The museum states that it was opened in 1929.) the Fitchburg Art Center opened, it was later renamed Fitchburg Art Museum. Most of the collection and the building were destroyed in a fire in 1934. The museum now has 20,000 square feet of exhibition space over four buildings and works of art from the pre-Columbian era to the 20th century. The works of art—which include paintings, prints, illustrated books, drawings and photographs—originated in Europe, the Americas, Asia, and Africa. The Fitchburg Art Museum has a collection of Norcross's work, along with works of John Singer Sargent, William Merritt Chase, and other American and European artists. Traute M. Marshall, author of Art Museums Plus, said, "[S]he stands up well against the more famous competition."

== Death ==
Norcross died of kidney failure on October 19, 1923.

== Posthumous exhibitions ==
Shows of her paintings were held after her death. The memorial exhibition at the Louvre, opened by American ambassador Myron T. Herrick, included 53 of her paintings in 1924. The Louvre retained two paintings Norcross made of the Musée des Arts Décoratifs's interior. Sixteen of her works were exhibited at the Salon d'Automne the same year; Norcross was the first American to have had a retrospective of her work there. A show was also held at the Museum of Fine Arts, Boston in 1925.
