= Roughwood =

Roughwood may refer to:

- Roughwood (Brookline, Massachusetts), listed on the NRHP in Massachusetts
- Roughwood (Easttown Township, Pennsylvania), listed on the NRHP in Chester County, Pennsylvania
