= Museum Partnership School =

Coordinates: 42°35′42″N 71°47′22″W

The Museum Partnership School is a Fitchburg, Massachusetts public pilot school partnered with the Fitchburg Art Museum. It began as a small elementary school and has slowly grown to encompass a middle school program. Students at this institution have the chance to learn directly from the original art displayed at the museum. The name has since been changed to "FAA", or "Fitchburg Art Academy".
