= Lois Howe =

American architect

Lois Lilley Howe
- Born: September 25, 1864; Cambridge, Massachusetts
- Died: September 13, 1964 (aged 99); Cambridge, Massachusetts
- Education: Massachusetts Institute of Technology; School of the Museum of Fine Arts, Boston
- Occupation: Architect
- Awards: American Institute of Architecture Fellow
- Practice: Howe, Manning & Almy, Inc.

Lois Lilley Howe (September 25, 1864 – September 13, 1964) was an American architect and founder of the first all female architecture firm in Boston, Massachusetts.

== Biography ==
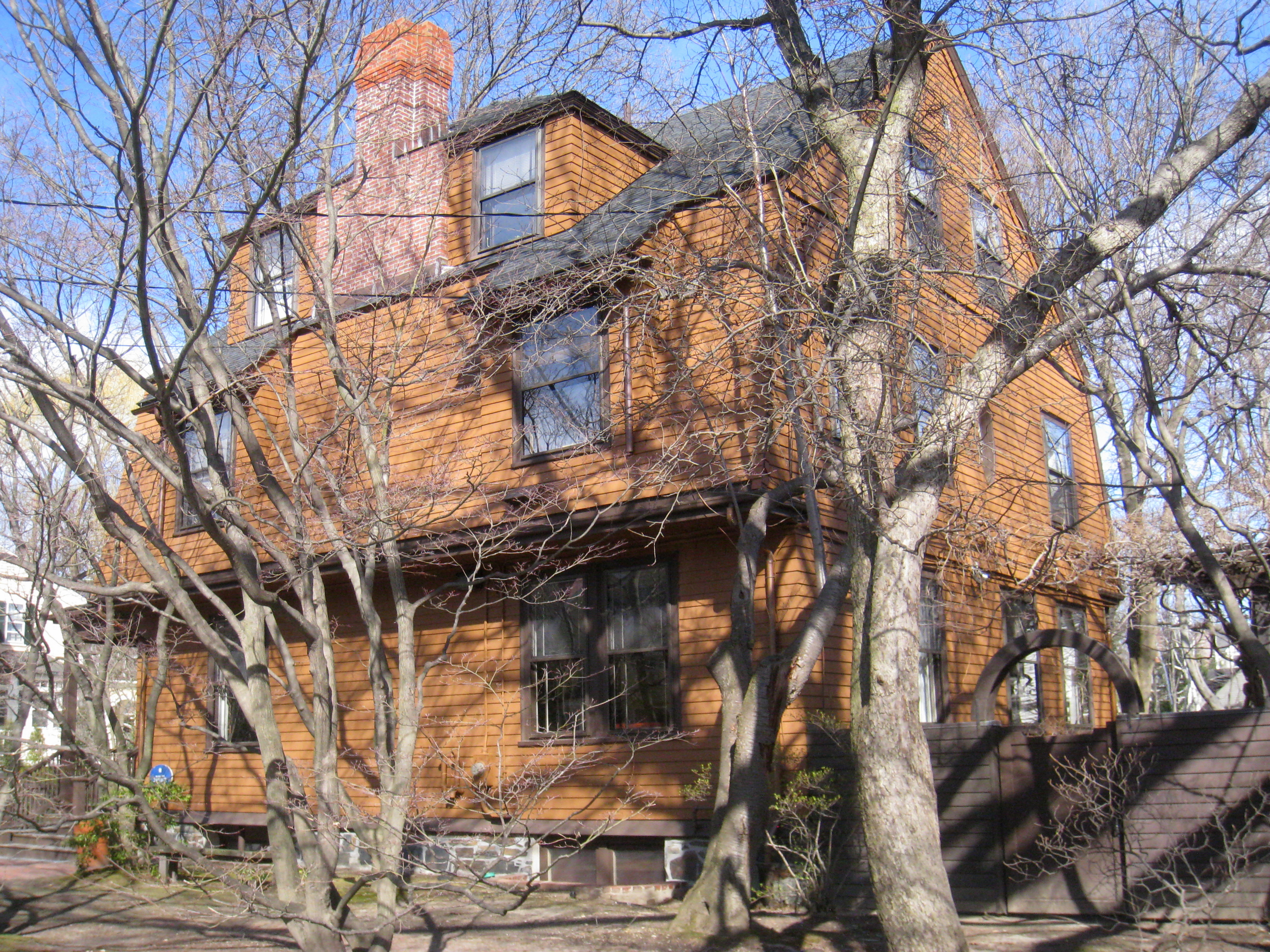
Lois Lilley Howe House (1889-1964), 6 Appleton Street, Cambridge, Massachusetts, USA (National Register of Historic Places)

Howe was born in Cambridge, Massachusetts. Howe studied at the School of the Museum of Fine Arts, Boston from 1882-1886 rather than attending Harvard Annex (later known as Radcliffe College). She later studied architecture at the Massachusetts Institute of Technology, which, by virtue of its land grant status, was one of only six American schools of architecture that admitted women before 1910. Howe graduated in 1890. In a class of only 66 students, she was the only woman.

After graduation she worked in the offices of Allen and Kenway (later renamed Allen & Collens). She placed second, after Sophia Hayden, in a competition to design the Women's Building at the Chicago World's Fair. Howe opened her own architecture office in 1894. At first, her projects consisted of new or remodeled houses for friends and acquaintances, but her efforts soon began to pay off in more commissions. By 1900, she had enough work to set up an office in downtown Boston. In 1907, she advocated for an innovative use of plaster, authoring articles in Architectural Review and Architectural Record. She had a passion for history and architecture details, which emerged not only in her work, but also in a book she published in 1913 with Constance Fuller (1886-?), another MIT graduate, entitled Details of Old New England Houses. In 1913, she partnered with Eleanor Manning and in 1926 Mary Almy joined the firm which then became Howe, Manning & Almy, Inc. Architect Eliza Newkirk Rogers worked for Howe before starting her own practice in 1913. For a short time around 1920, the landscape architect Elizabeth Greenleaf Pattee worked for Howe.

During her career, Howe was president of the Business Women's Club of Boston and president of the MIT Women's Association. She served on the Boston Society of Architect's Small House Bureau, the AIA Committee on Small Houses, and was appointed to the Board of Directors of the Housing Association of Metropolitan Boston. Howe was 73 when she retired in 1937; Howe, Manning & Almy, Inc. dissolved and her partners launched independent practices. Long after she finished practising architecture, she continued to practice history, giving talks at the Cambridge Historical Society, trying to recall for younger members Cambridge as it was in her girlhood. Howe died in 1964, just short of her one-hundredth birthday.

== Awards and recognition ==
She received her first acclaim in 1893 where she was a second place winning in the national competition for the Woman's Building at the World's Columbian Exhibition in Chicago.

In 1901, Howe became the second woman member of the American Institute of Architecture (AIA). In 1931, she was elected the first female Fellow of the AIA.

Many of their designs were featured in articles and books of House Beautiful and Architecture, extolling the best small houses.

== Projects ==
Originally, Howe founded her firm in Boston on Tremont Street in Boston taking commissions for renovations and new housing. One early renovation was the Hooper-Eliot House in 1902, where she "added the broken scroll–pedimented doorway."

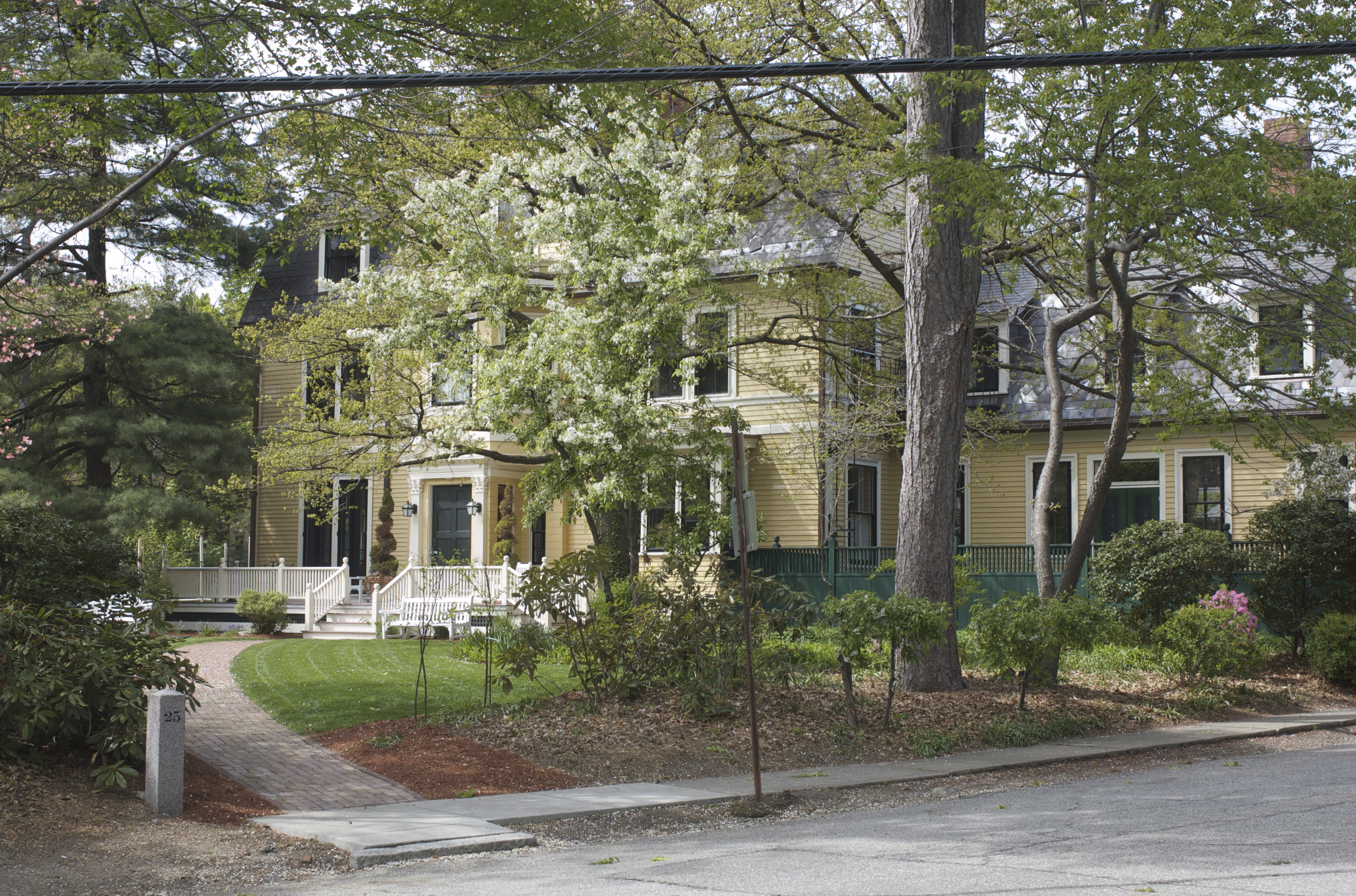
Hooper-Eliot House, 1872, Sturgis and Brigham; 1902, Lois Lilley Howe. 25 Reservoir St.

With her firm partners, Howe, Manning & Almy completed over 426 commissions and 500 projects (most of which are still standing) over 43 years of practice.The geography, design, and craftsmanship have resulted in "comfortable and attractive dwellings" whose value have appreciated, compared to similar properties in the region.

One of Howes first original designs was 1 Kennedy Road in Cambridge, MA. This home was dates to 1894 and was created by Howe for her newlywed friends. While the original building showed Howes untested design skills, in 1913 she renovated the home to the one still found today.

Commission Number	Building Name	Year	Location	Other Information	Reference
243	Walnut Hill School	1913	12 Highland St, Natick, Massachusetts 01760		
398	Suffrage Coffee House	1917			
408	Lucy Stone Hospital	1918			
414	Boston Army and Navy Canteen	1918			
537	The College Club of Boston	1923			
574	McCall's Magazine	1923-24			
586	Chec-R Shoe Store	1923			
596	Women’s Republican Club	1924			
640	Simmons University	1925-26	300 Fenway, Boston, MA 02115		

== Legacy ==
Lois Lilley Howe's papers reside in the collection for Howe, Manning, and Almy at MIT. The Lois Lilley Howe photographic collection is housed at the Cambridge Historical Society.
