= Mary Almy =

American architect (1883–1967)

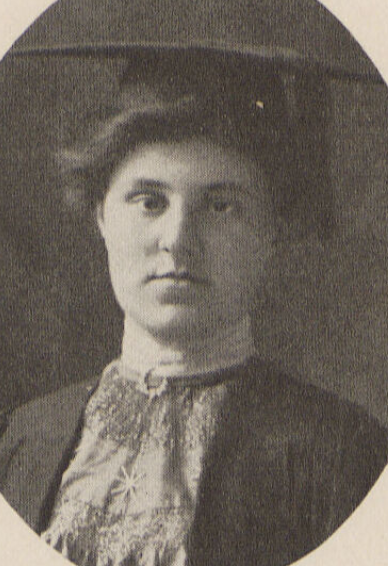
- Mary Almy, from the 1905 yearbook of Radcliffe College
- Born: 1883; Beverly Farms, Beverly, Massachusetts, United States
- Died: July 29, 1967 (aged 83–84); Boston, Massachusetts
- Education: Radcliffe College, Massachusetts Institute of Technology
- Occupation: Architect
- Practice: Howe, Manning & Almy, Inc.

Mary Almy (1883–1967) was an American architect, and a partner at Howe, Manning & Almy, Inc., one of the first architecture firms founded by women in the United States and specializing in domestic architecture. She studied architecture at the Massachusetts Institute of Technology from 1917 to 1919.

== Early life and education ==
Almy grew up in Cambridge, Massachusetts. She had polio as a child and walked with crutches throughout her life. In 1905 she graduated from Radcliffe College. She worked as a teacher before developing an interest in architecture. She earned a Bachelor of Science degree in architecture at the Massachusetts Institute of Technology in 1919 after three years of study. Due to academic policies in place at the time, female students were not accepted into the four-year program in Architecture, but limited to the two-year degree program in architectural drafting at MIT. Prior to her education at the Massachusetts Institute of Technology, Almy designed a summer home for her family on Cape Cod.

== Career ==
Almy worked as a drafter at a London based architectural firm called Collcutt and Hamp, for two years. In the 1920s, she became a drafter for the Boston firm owned by Lois Lilley Howe and Eleanor Manning, who had also attended MIT. In 1926, she became a member of the American Institute of Architects and a partner at Howe, Manning & Almy, Inc. Upon becoming partner at the firm, she took over the position of chief draftsman. Despite surviving the Great Depression, the firm closed in 1937 after Howe retired. Manning and Almy continued in private practice. Almy also worked with landscape architect Henrietta Pope.

== Works ==
Commission Number	Building Name	Year	Location	Other Information	Reference
652	Fitchburg Art Museum	1926	185 Elm St, Fitchburg, Massachusetts 01420		
660	Cape Cod Competition	1926	Unbuilt		
684	The College Club of Boston	1926	44 Commonwealth Avenue, Boston, MA 02116		
686	Pine Manor College	1926	400 Heath St, Chestnut Hill, Massachusetts 02467		
724	Radcliffe College	1928	Cambridge, MassachusettsUnited States		
831	Fleur-de-Lis Camp	1931	120 Howeville Rd, Fitzwilliam, New Hampshire 03447		
834	Stevens Institute of Technology	1932	1 Castle Point Terrace, Hoboken, New Jersey 07030		
835	Winship - Boston Public Schools	1932	54 Dighton Street, Brighton, MA 02135		
866	Subsistence Homesteads Division	1933-34	United States Department of the Interior		
867	Lynn Boy Scout Camp	1934	Lynn, Massachusetts		
873	Paine Webber	1934	48 Congress Street, Boston, MA		
878	Lynn Bank Block	1934	21–29 Exchange Street Lynn, MA 01901		
890	Cambridge Social Union	1935	Cambridge, Massachusetts		
944	Garland Junior College	1937	Chestnut Street Beacon Hill, Boston		

== Legacy ==
Mary Almy's papers reside in the collection for Howe, Manning and Almy at MIT. The Almy family papers are located at the Schlesinger Library at Radcliffe College. Howe, Manning, and Almy were the subject of a dissertation defended in 1976 at Boston University by Gail Morse.
