= The College Club of Boston =

American women's club

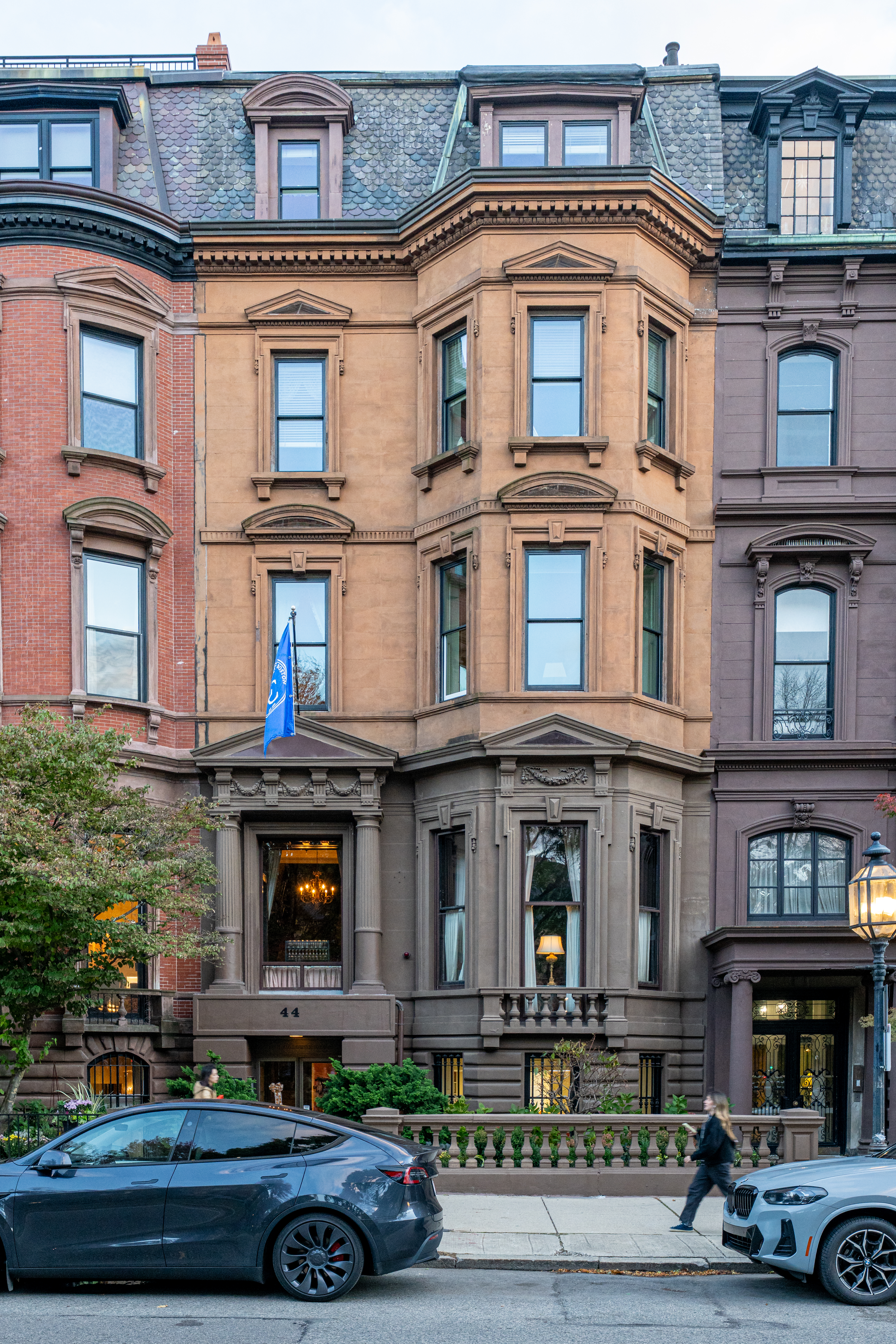
- The College Club of Boston
- Abbreviation: CCoB
- Formation: December 1890
- Type: NGO
- Legal status: Foundation
- Purpose: Educational
- Location: Boston, Massachusetts
- Coordinates: 42°21′10″N 71°04′24″W
- Region served: Boston, Boston Public Schools
- Members: Private
- Official language: English
- Website: thecollegeclubofboston.com

The College Club of Boston is a private membership organization founded in 1890 as the first women's college club in the United States. Located in the historic Back Bay of Boston, Massachusetts, at 44 Commonwealth Avenue, the College Club was established by nineteen college educated women whose mission was to form a social club where they and other like-minded women could meet and share companionship.

== History ==
In December 1890, 76 Marlborough Street, also located in Boston's Back Bay, became the first home of The College Club. The building at 76 Marlborough was purchased by Club member Mabel Cummings in 1893. The Club was designed by Mary Almy.

In April 1905, the College Club acquired the clubhouse at 40 Commonwealth Avenue, which contained an Old English drawing room and seven bedrooms, each of which "were furnished and decorated in the colors of various women's colleges: crimson rambler wallpaper for Radcliffe, blue silk curtains for Wellesley, white (with brass beds) for Smith, dawn pink and gray for Vassar."

In 1924, the Club purchased 44 Commonwealth Avenue, which was the family home of Royal E. Robbins, a major stockholder in the Waltham Watch Company. The brownstone townhouse was built in 1864 and was designed in the High Victorian style.

In 1985 and established The College Club Scholarship Fund, Inc. as an IRS 501(c)(3) designated charitable organization. The endowed fund is administered by Club members. Each year since 1986, the Scholarship Fund has awarded college tuition assistance to deserving high school seniors from Boston Public Schools.

== See also ==
- General Federation of Women's Clubs, founded 1890
- National American Woman Suffrage Association, founded 1890
