= Messina College =

Private college in Chestnut Hill, Massachusetts, US (1911–2020)

- Private constituent college
- Boston College
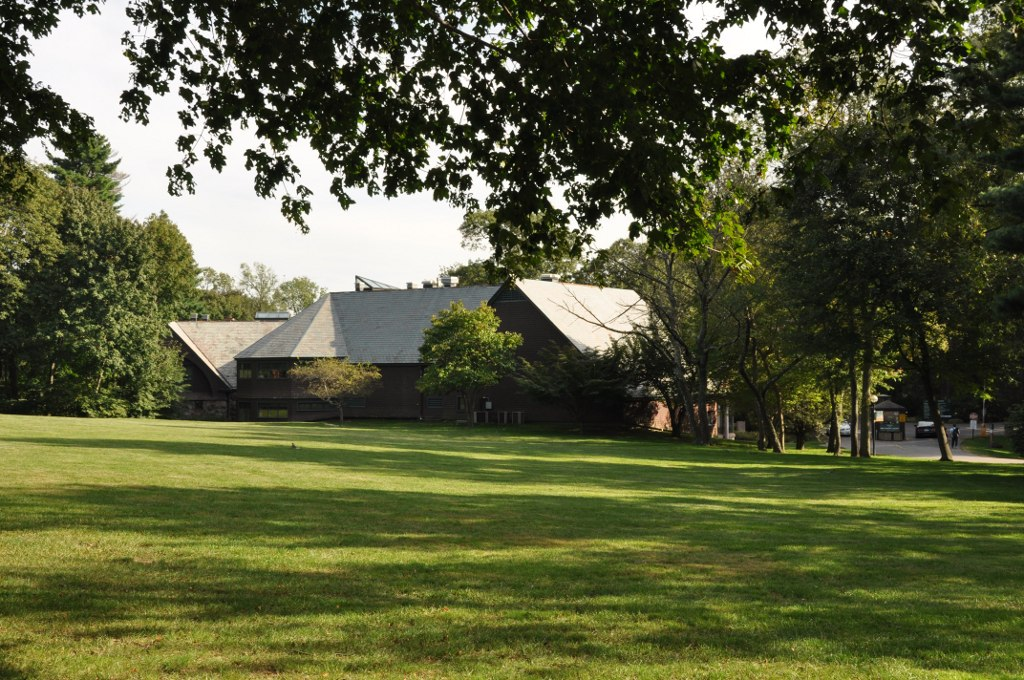
- Roughwood
- Location: Chestnut Hill, Massachusetts, U.S.
- Motto: Aymez Loyaute (Old French for "Love Loyalty") (1911-2020)
- Founder: Helen Temple Cooke
- Established: Original institution: 1911; 115 years ago Current form: July 2024; 2 years ago
- Named for: Jesuit College, Messina
- Former names: List: Post-Graduate Department of Dana Hall (1911–1917); Pine Manor (1917–1930); Pine Manor Junior College (1930–1977); Pine Manor Institute for Student Success (2020-2024)
- Colors: Current: Maroon and gold Former: Green & white
- Gender: Co-educational
- Dean: Erick Berrelleza
- Undergraduates: 100
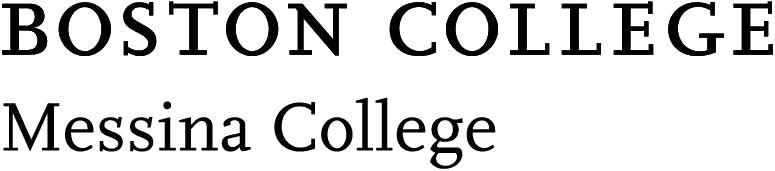
- Website: bc.edu/messina

Messina College is an undergraduate constituent college of Boston College. Until 2020 the school was an independent private college in Chestnut Hill, Massachusetts referred to as Pine Manor College (PMC).

The school was founded in 1911 as a post-graduate program of Dana Hall School, an all-girls preparatory high school. Later becoming independent, it was historically a women's college. In 2014, it became a co-ed college serving primarily students of color. In May 2020, with Pine Manor College's long-term financial instability exacerbated by the COVID-19 pandemic, Boston College stepped in, integrating PMC into its institutional structure. After at first being called the Pine Manor Institute for Student Success, the former PMC campus is now known as Messina College.

== History ==
=== Finishing school ===
The institution was founded in 1911 by Helen Temple Cooke as part of the Dana Hall School in Wellesley, Massachusetts. Originally known as the "Post-Graduate Department of Dana Hall", it was a women-only institution at a time when women were generally denied access to higher education. Mary Almy was the architect of the school building, known as Pine Manor House. 28 pupils enrolled for September 1911.

In 1917, the school became known as "Pine Manor".

=== Junior college ===
In 1930, the school received a charter as an independent junior college, becoming "Pine Manor Junior College" (PMJC). Marie Warren Potter was named school president; she served until 1952, a period of 22 years.

Author and educator Ella Lyman Cabot taught at PMJC in its early days. Pioneering female architect Eleanor Manning O'Connor taught at PMJC in the 1930s; educator Mary Nourse taught history there in 1933–1934. Mary Virginia Harris, a veteran of World War II who served in the WAVES program and who wrote its manual, was a dean there.

Alfred Tuxbury Hill became Pine Manor's first male president in 1952; he was succeeded in 1956 by Frederick Carlos Ferry, Jr., who served as president until 1974, a tenure of 18 years.

=== Move to Chestnut Hill ===
In 1964 the school moved to a 78-acre (320,000 m^{2}) estate in the Chestnut Hill neighborhood of Brookline. The estate, then known as Roughwood, was the residence of Ernest B. Dane, at that time president of the Brookline Savings and Trust. Many of the school's buildings are original to the estate and were renovated to accommodate the college.

=== Transition to a four-year college ===
In 1977, under the leadership of President Rosemary Ashby, the school expanded its mission to offer four-year bachelor's degrees, and became "Pine Manor College". However, by the end of President Ashby's 22-year tenure in the mid-nineties, enrollment had declined by 50 percent to less than 300 full-time students, threatening the survival of the college.

=== New mission and financial woes ===
In 1996, under new president Gloria Nemerowicz, the school changed its mission from educating women in the social elite to educating women of color from under-served communities. This was made possible, in large part, due to the generosity of wealthy older alumnae; in 1998, Pine Manor College cut its tuition by 34 percent after receiving a bequest of $4 million from Frances Crandall Dyke '25. Although this shift increased enrollment and brought the school praise and admiration, the school's financial endowment declined.

In 2011, the college failed to meet the financial benchmarks required by its accreditation agency, forcing the end of President Nemerowicz's tenure after 15 years. Over the next nine years, the school had a succession of five college presidents, including Alane K. Shanks (2011–2012), Ellen Hurwitz (interim, 2012–2013), E. Joseph Lee (2013–2015), former president Rosemary Ashby (interim, 2015–2016), and finally, Thomas M. O'Reilly (2016–2020).

Fiscal year 2012 ended with a $1.7 million deficit.

By May 2013, Pine Manor's enrollment was about 400 students, and the six-year graduation rate was just 34 percent. The school's tuition was $36,000 per year (though the school was very generous with financial aid — often offering more than 50 percent off the price). In late 2013, Pine Manor’s endowment was just $10 million. In May 2013, the college sold 5.2 acres to New England Patriots quarterback Tom Brady for $4.5 million to build his family home. The school sold off an additional acre for a home site in 2013.

=== Becoming co-ed; financial challenges ===
In September 2014, the college welcomed its first co-ed class, admitting men for the first time in its 103-year history. The following year, President E. Joseph Lee stepped down amidst reports of the school's financial difficulties and declining enrollment.

In April 2016, the New England Association of Schools and Colleges placed Pine Manor on probation, risking the loss of its accreditation. President Tom O'Reilly took the helm in May 2016. One year later, the town of Brookline informed the college that they would be seeking to seize seven acres of the school's 52 acres under eminent domain for the building of an elementary school.

In 2018, the New England Association of Schools and Colleges removed Pine Manor from probation, ensuring the college's continuous accreditation since it began offering degrees. In May 2019, Pine Manor College was recognized by NASPA and the Center for First-Generation Student Success for its commitment to serving first-generation college students.

=== Integration with Boston College ===
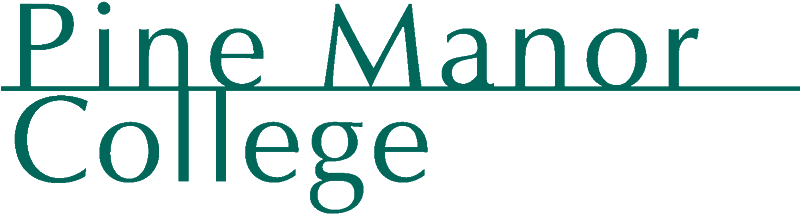
Pine Manor College wordmark, before being part of Boston College

The COVID-19 pandemic cut off most of Pine Manor College's revenue, and in May 2020, Boston College (BC) announced it had entered into an integration agreement that allowed outgoing Pine Manor students to study on their campus through the 2022 school year. Working together, BC and PMC developed a new Boston College initiative known as "Pine Manor Institute for Student Success" with a $50 million endowment from BC. An initiative designed to enhance educational opportunities for underrepresented, first-generation students, the Pine Manor Institute (PMI) was to include a cost-free summer enrichment program for students in grades 8-12 starting in June 2022, and an associate’s degree-granting two-year residential college starting in 2024.

Outgoing PMC students had the option to stay for two years and then transfer to Boston College's Woods College of Advancing Studies, while some Pine Manor College faculty and staff joined Boston College with the rest receiving severance and outplacement assistance.

=== Messina College ===
Messina College opened in July 2024 for over 100 first-generation college students. It offers two-year associate degrees in applied data science, health sciences, general business, and applied psychology and human development. The college emphasizes support for underprivileged students through a residential model, small class sizes, and mentorship, preparing graduates for workforce entry or transfer to four-year institutions.

== Academics ==
Pine Manor College offered nine undergraduate majors. Students graduated with the degrees of Bachelor of Arts, Bachelor of Science, Associate of Arts, or Associate of Science.

From 2006 to 2021, PMC offered a four-semester Master of Fine Arts course in creative writing known as the "Solstice Low-Residency MFA Program". The Solstice program moved to nearby Lasell University in 2022.

In 2016 and 2017 the college hosted two English as a second or foreign language programs, which also served as university pathways programs.

== Athletics ==
Pine Manor Gators wordmark

The Pine Manor athletic teams were called the Gators. The college was a member of the Division III ranks of the National Collegiate Athletic Association (NCAA), primarily competing in the Coast to Coast Athletic Conference (C2C), to only spend its only season during the 2020–21 school year, which was their final season of the college's athletic program.

The college's athletic teams had previously competed as NCAA Independents and as members of the now-defunct American Collegiate Athletic Association (ACAA) from 2017–18 to 2019–20. Its women's teams competed as members of the Great South Athletic Conference (GSAC) from 2012–13 to 2015–16 (the final season of the conference before disbanding). Pine Manor also competed as a member of the Great Northeast Athletic Conference (GNAC) from 1995–96 to 2011–12.

PMC offered women's athletics in the sports of basketball, cross country, softball, soccer, and volleyball. The college also previously fielded teams in women's tennis and lacrosse. The school started offering men's athletics in 2014 with the addition of men's basketball and soccer teams. In 2015, the school added men's cross country. The men's volleyball team started varsity competition in 2017. Pine Manor added its fifth men's sport, and tenth sport overall, in 2017–18 with the addition of baseball. In 2018, after receiving conference titles in both men's soccer and basketball, the American Collegiate Athletic Association awarded Pine Manor College the inaugural ACAA Men's President's Cup.

The school sports mascot was the Gator.

== Pine Manor College Child Study Center ==
The Pine Manor College Child Study Center was founded in 1974. Owned by Pine Manor College, this private, non-profit preschool center was licensed by the Massachusetts Department of Early Education and Care (EEC) and served 40 children per day between the ages of 2 years 9 months through age 6. The school was initially founded to broaden the learning experiences of the Pine Manor College students who were studying Early Childhood Education and Child Development, and to provide a quality preschool for families in the community. The Child Study Center continued to serve as a laboratory school for college students providing students experiential learning and training, while offering part- and full-day quality preschool experience to young children year-round.

== Notable people ==
=== Notable alumnae ===
- Wallis Annenberg, heiress
- Josephine Abercrombie, businesswoman
- Doran Clark, actress
- Wendy Diamond, founder of Animal Fair magazine
- Meg Gallagher, actress
- Busty Heart, entertainer
- Leslie Hindman, auctioneer
- Karyn Kupcinet, actress
- Lori Lieberman, singer-songwriter ("Killing Me Softly with His Song")
- Dorothy McGuire, Academy Award-nominated actress
- Heather Nauert, journalist and former public official
- Mary Curtiss Ratcliff, visual artist
- Hillary B. Smith, Daytime Emmy-winning actress
- Pauline Tompkins, president of Cedar Crest College
- Constance H. Williams, politician
- Lydia Woodward, television writer and co-producer of ER

=== Notable faculty ===
- Frances R. Brown, dean who was also president of Chevy Chase Junior College

=== Pine Manor College presidents ===
- 1911–1916: Helen Temple Cooke
- 1916–1928: Adele Lathrop
- 1928–1929: Constance Warren
- 1929-1930: Helen Temple Cooke (interim)
- 1930–1952: Marie Warren Potter
- 1952–1956: Alfred Tuxbury Hill
- 1956–1974: Frederick Carlos Ferry, Jr.
- 1974–1996: Rosemary Ashby
- 1996–2011: Gloria Nemerowicz
- 2011–2012: Alane K. Shanks
- 2012–2013: Ellen Hurwitz (interim)
- 2013–2015: E. Joseph Lee
- 2015–2016: Rosemary Ashby (interim)
- 2016–2020: Thomas M. O'Reilly
