= Eliza Newkirk Rogers =

Eliza Jacobus Newkirk Rogers
- Born: Eliza Newkirk; 1877; Wyncote, Pennsylvania
- Died: 1966 (aged 88–89)
- Occupations: Architect, Educator
- Spouse: George Benjamin Rogers (m. 1924)

Eliza Newkirk Rogers (1877–1966) was an architect and a professor at Wellesley College.

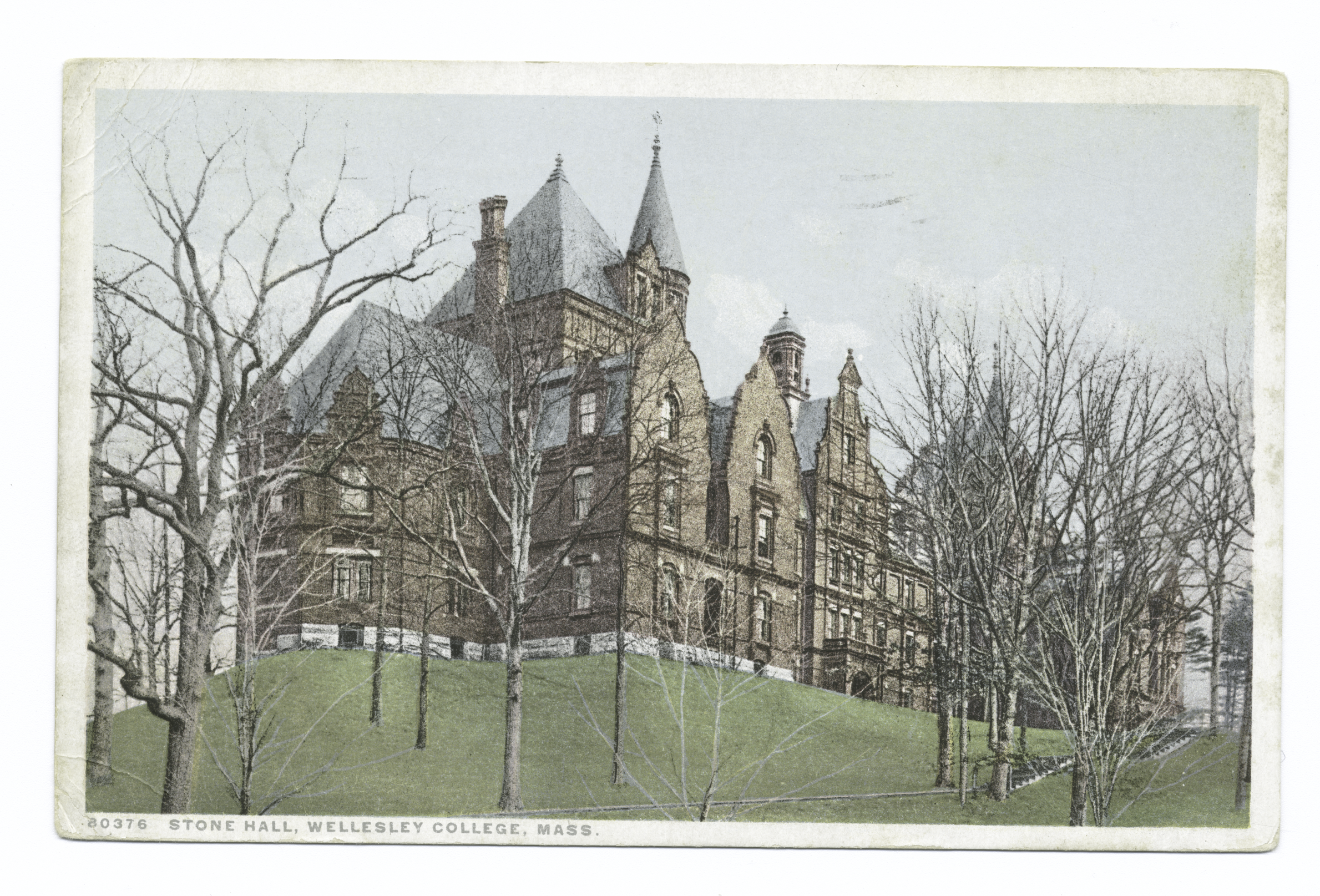
StoneHall, Wellesley College remodeled by Newkirk 1921

== Biography ==
Eliza Newkirk grew up in Wyncote, Pennsylvania, and pursued undergraduate degrees in art and math at Wellesley College, beginning in 1896 and graduating in 1900. She garnered a fellowship in architecture and attended classes from 1902-4 at MIT and Museum of Fine Arts, Boston. Subsequently, she spent 15 months in Italy researching her thesis "Domes of Renaissance Italy", which was completed in 1906; she received a master's degree from Wellesley in 1907.

Newkirk taught for more than thirty years. After her undergraduate degree, she taught at a girls school for two years. While working on her thesis, she taught art history at Mount Holyoke College in 1905. In 1906, she began teaching art history and drawing at Wellesley. In 1926 she taught "New England Architecture" at Wellesley College. She photographed for and otherwise assisted the press board and director of publicity at Wellesley. In the late 1930s, she lectured on architectural topics at Rosemont College.

Newkirk also practiced architecture beginning in the 1900s. She worked for ten years at the practices of Prince and McLanahan in Philadelphia, Kendall, Taylor, and Stevens in Boston, and for Lois Lilley Howe in Boston. She opened her own firm in 1913 and designed, renovated, and added to facilities at Walnut Hill School in Natick, Massachusetts and Wellesley; as well as residential projects. She consulted for Frank Miles Day, the supervising architect in charge of reconstructing the campus after the 1914 fire.

Newkirk toured England with her colleague Eleanor Manning and wrote several articles in House Beautiful in 1926. She had previous authored articles for them in 1918. Additionally she wrote for the Journal of the American Institute of Architects in 1926.

Newkirk married George Benjamin Rogers, the head master of Phillips Exeter Academy in New Hampshire, in 1924. She commuted between there and Boston from then until 1936, when her husband died. Then, she moved to Philadelphia to live with her family. Eliza Newkirk Rogers shaped the art history department at Wellesley, and left behind numerous students. Her papers may be found at Wellesley; as well, she donated her art collection to the Davis Museum at Wellesley College. She continues to be remembered through "The Eliza Newkirk Rogers Prize for Architecture" at Wellesley.

== Works ==
- 1913-15 Dormitory, Walnut Hill School
- 1920-1 Highland Hall, Walnut Hill School (addition with George Marlowe)
- 1921 Stone Hall, Wellesley College (remodel)
- 1921 Agora Society House (now Slater International Center), Wellesley College
- 1921 Alpha Cappa Chi House (remodel/rebuild, now Harambee House), Wellesley College
- 1922 Horton House (Faculty Club), Wellesley College
- 1923 Hallowell (Faculty apartments), Wellesley College
- c. 1923 Ridgeway Dormitory, Wellesley College
- c. 1923 Elliot House Dormitory, Wellesley College
- c. 1923 Dower Dormitory, Wellesley College
- c. 1923 The Playhouse, Walnut Hill School
- c. 1928-30 gymnasum, Walnut Hill School
- 1930 Shepherd Faculty Apartments, Wellesley College
