= Florence Ward Stiles =

American architect

- Born: 1897
- Died: 1981 (aged 83–84)
- Known for: Architecture

Florence Ward Stiles (1897–1981) was an American architect and librarian who in 1939 was appointed the first advisor to women students at the Massachusetts Institute of Technology (MIT). She was awarded an architecture degree as a member of MIT's class of 1923. After graduating, she joined the all-woman firm of Howe, Manning & Almy, Inc. Her career included working at the firm of Stone & Webster. Later she established a private practice with a focus on small dwellings and remodeling historic houses. In 1931 she became the librarian at MIT's Rotch Library of Architecture and Planning. She joined the American Institute of Architects in 1943. In 1948 she resigned her position as Rotch librarian to resume her private architectural practice.
