= Johnson O'Connor =

American psychometrician

Johnson O'Connor (January 22, 1891 – July 1, 1973) was an American psychometrician, researcher, and educator. He is most remembered as a pioneer in the study of aptitude testing and as an advocate for the importance of vocabulary.

== Early life and education ==
O’Connor came from a prosperous and well-rooted Chicago family. His parents were John O’Connor and Nelie Johnson O’Connor. O'Connor's mother descended from ancestors who were among the first Puritan settlers of Massachusetts, while his father was an attorney who at one time shared an office with the famous lawyer Clarence Darrow. O'Connor received a progressive primary and secondary education with John Dewey at Dewey's famous University of Chicago Laboratory School. He was graduated from Harvard University in 1913 with a degree in Philosophy. After graduation he conducted research in astronomical mathematics under famed astronomer Percival Lowell, brother of the poet Amy Lowell and worked in electrical engineering at American Steel and Wire and General Electric.

== Aptitude research at General Electric ==
In a visionary experiment, the General Electric leadership decided that if employees could be matched to positions that best suited their natural abilities and retrained in those areas, it would benefit both company and employees. In 1922 F.P. Cox of GE asked O’Connor to develop an in-house program called the "human" engineering project that would find the proper positioning for each employee and retrain them within that field. This led O’Connor into a study of inborn aptitudes and to the development of aptitude tests that he called "work samples." Using empirical research, O'Connor developed classifications for specific human abilities, to which he gave labels such as "Graphoria," "Ideaphoria," and "Structural Visualization." O’Connor became one of the first researchers to offer documentation that aptitudes are in fact innate. For example, one who is mathematically inclined can learn much more quickly and easily about mathematics than can one whose aptitudes in this area are low. Similarly, if one were to take two groups, one that possessed a high aptitude for finger dexterity and one that did not, with practice, both groups performance would improve, but the group that possessed the higher aptitude would continue to outperform the other despite identical training.

== Later research ==
O'Connor sought to expand his efforts in researching human aptitudes and in 1930 he founded the Human Engineering Laboratory at Stevens Institute of Technology This organization evolved into the Johnson O'Connor Research Foundation, a non-profit organization with aptitude testing centers in several major U.S. cities.

In addition to gathering data on skills specific to various vocations, O’Connor also gathered various general data on his subjects. After establishing the link between specific aptitudes and performance in certain positions, O’Connor decided to take a second look at his data and see if there were any aptitudes which were more important than others in determining general success and advancement. It was during the course of this testing that O’Connor stumbled upon an unexpected discovery: A person’s vocabulary level was the best single measure for predicting occupational success in every area. Furthermore, vocabulary is not innate, and can be acquired by everybody. Because acquisition of vocabulary was not, in O'Connor's view, determined by innate aptitudes, it became a major focus of his later writings. O'Connor considered vocabulary augmentation a major key to unlocking human potential. His later research included an effort to catalogue the most important words for English-speaking people to know and to order these words by difficulty. O’Connor used his findings to improve vocabulary in American students. By first isolating a student’s vocabulary level through a carefully researched multiple choice diagnostic test, O' Connor believed that students could enter a vocabulary program of study that matches their skill level. It is at this level, and just beyond, where learning is most efficient. O'Connor himself dedicated several books to the topic of learning vocabulary including: "The Johnson O'Connor English Vocabulary Builder" and "The Johnson O'Connor Science Vocabulary Builder" as well as the "Ginn Vocabulary Building Program" which he co-authored. His own extensive vocabulary served him well when he was a guest on Groucho Marx's You Bet Your Life television program. Groucho joked about his guest having two last names.

The final years of O'Connor's life were spent researching, lecturing, and writing about human aptitudes and ways for people to maximize their mental potential. On these subjects he authored numerous books, including "Structural Visualization", "The Unique Individual", and "Psychometrics." He also devoted much of his later research to studying vocabulary and the processes by which people acquired word knowledge. O'Connor died in Mexico City, D.F., in July 1973 and is buried beside his wife, the architect Eleanor Manning O'Connor, in Newport Beach, California. He was survived by his son, Chadwell O'Connor, an engineer and Academy Award winner who designed the O'Connor Fluid-Head camera tripod.

== Writings ==
- Born That Way, 1928
- Psychometrics, 1934
- Too Many Aptitude Woman, 1941
- Ideaphoria, 1945
- Aptitudes and Languages, 1944
- Structural Visualization, 1948
- The Unique Individual, 1948
- English Vocabulary Builder, 1948

== Bibliography ==
- Broadley, Margaret E., "Your Natural Gifts", EPM Publication, Inc., 2002 (paperback, ISBN 0-939009-56-0)
- Wyatt, George. Johnson O’Connor: A Portrait From Memory. EPM Publications, Inc., 2002.
- Who's Was Who in America, vol VI, 1974-1976. Marquis Who's Who Inc. 1977. Chicago Ill.
- Atlantic Monthly, February, 1934, Atlantic Monthly Company, Boston, 1934
