= Pauline Tompkins =

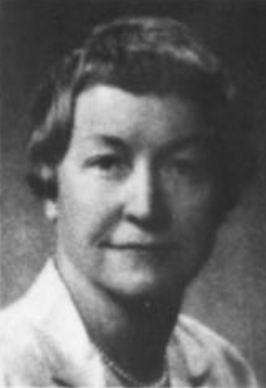
- Tompkins in 1964
- Born: March 5, 1918; Rhinelander, Wisconsin
- Died: November 19, 2004 (aged 86); Edgecomb, Maine
- Occupations: College president, educational consultant
- Known for: General director, American Association of University Women (1959-1967); president, Cedar Crest College

Pauline "Polly" Tompkins (March 5, 1918 – November 19, 2004) was the first female president of Cedar Crest College in Allentown, Pennsylvania, in the United States.

== Early life and education ==
Tompkins was born in Rhinelander, Wisconsin. She graduated from Pine Manor College in 1938 and Mount Holyoke College in 1941 with Phi Beta Kappa honors. She received her Ph.D. from Tufts University in 1948.

== Career ==
Tompkins was general director of the American Association of University Women from 1959 to 1967. She was appointed by President Lyndon B. Johnson to the nine-member United States Advisory Commission on International Education and Cultural Affairs in 1964. She was chairman of the board of the Carnegie Foundation for the Advancement of Teaching from 1974 to 1976.

Tompkins died in 2004 in Edgecomb, Maine, aged 86 years.

== Published works ==
- Pauline Tompkins (1949). American-Russian Relations in the Far East. Macmillan.
