= Miller Camera Support Equipment =

- Founded: 1954
- Founder: Eric Miller
- Headquarters: Sydney, NSW; Australia
- Products: Tripods and Fluid Heads
- Website: Millertripods.com

Miller Camera Support Equipment is the commercial name of R. E. Miller Pty Ltd, an independent Australian manufacturer of tripods, fluid heads and various accessories for professional camera systems (dollies, spreaders and other camera supports such as monopods and pedestal systems). The company supplies ENG/EFP equipment to broadcast and government.

Miller is also the distributor of Lowel lighting equipment in Australia.

== History ==
Robert Eric Miller, an Australian engineer from Sydney, invented the fluid head for motion picture cameras for which he was granted an Australian patent in 1946 and US patent in 1949. He founded Miller Camera Support Equipment in 1954, manufacturing fluid heads and tripods. The same year, he developed the Miller Viscosity Drag. This invention greatly improved image quality in films by applying user-variable dampening to the pan and tilt movements of the camera.

Miller products are widely used in Australia, and since 1958, have been exported to the US, Europe and Asia.

== Location ==
Miller Camera Support Equipment headquarters and manufacturing are based near Sydney, Australia. The company also has service facilities in London and in New York, plus branch offices in Canada, California, Hong Kong, China, and various European countries.

== Main current products ==
=== Fluid heads ===
- 75mm bowl
  - DS range: DS5, DS10 and DS20. Introduced in 1992.
  - Compass range: Compass 12, Compass 15 and Compass 20. Introduced in 2009.
- 100mm bowl
  - Arrow range: Arrow 25, Arrow 40 and Arrow 50.
- 150mm bowl
  - Skyline 70

=== Tripods ===
- Toggle : lightweight tripods with traditional locks and 75mm bowls.
- Solo : spreaderless lightweight tripods with concentric locks and 75mm or 100mm bowls.
- Sprinter : fast setup lightweight tripods with 100mm bowls
- HD (Heavy Duty): sturdy tripods with 100mm or 150mm bowls
