= Fitchburg Art Museum =

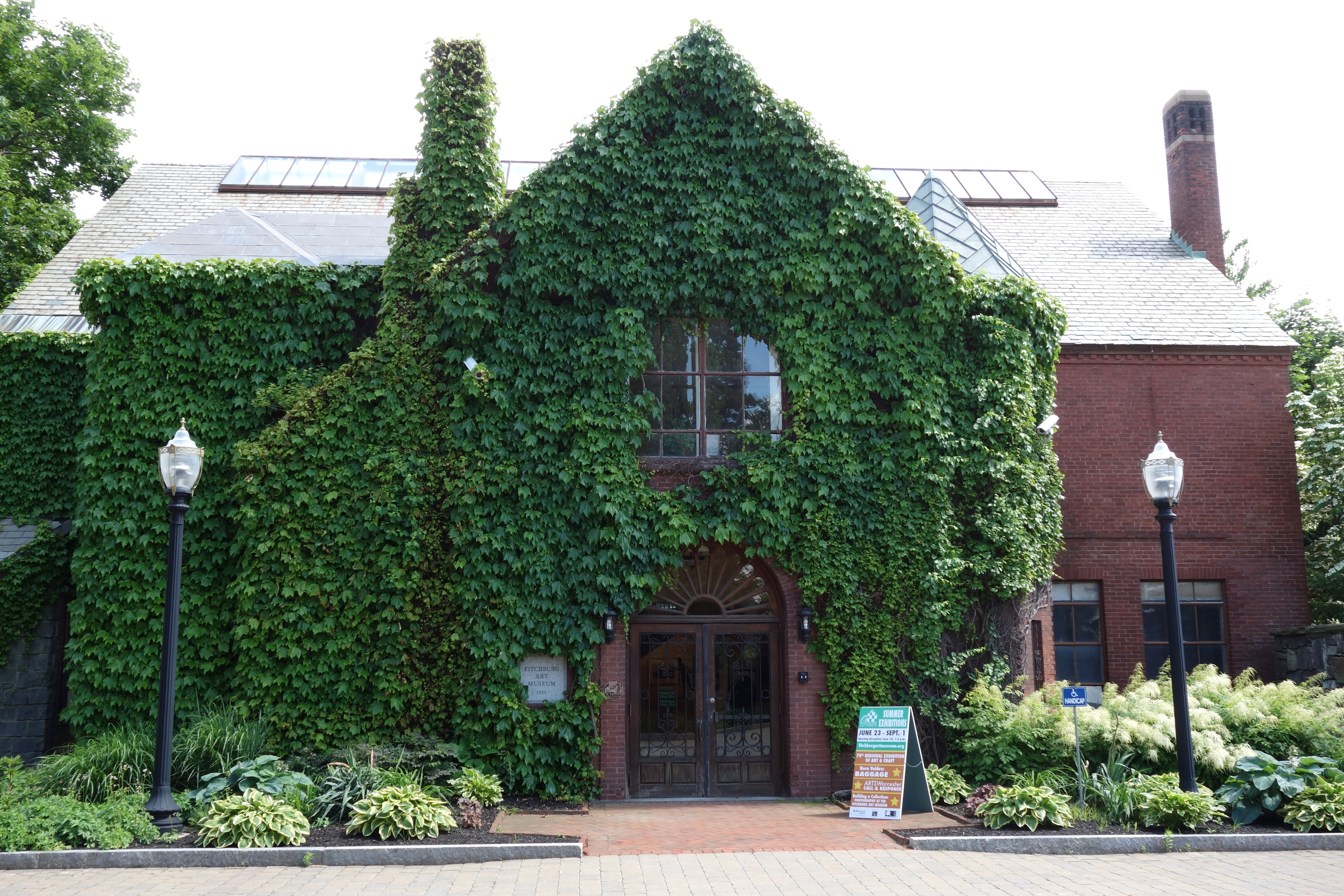
- Established: 1925
- Location: Fitchburg, Massachusetts, US
- Coordinates: 42.5869°N 71.8038°W
- Type: Art museum
- Visitors: 15,000 (2025)
- Director: Nick Capasso
- Public transit access: MBTA Fitchburg Line Fitchburg
- Website: fitchburgartmuseum.org

The Fitchburg Art Museum (FAM) is a regional art museum based in Fitchburg, Worcester County, Massachusetts, United States. It was founded in 1925.

== Description ==
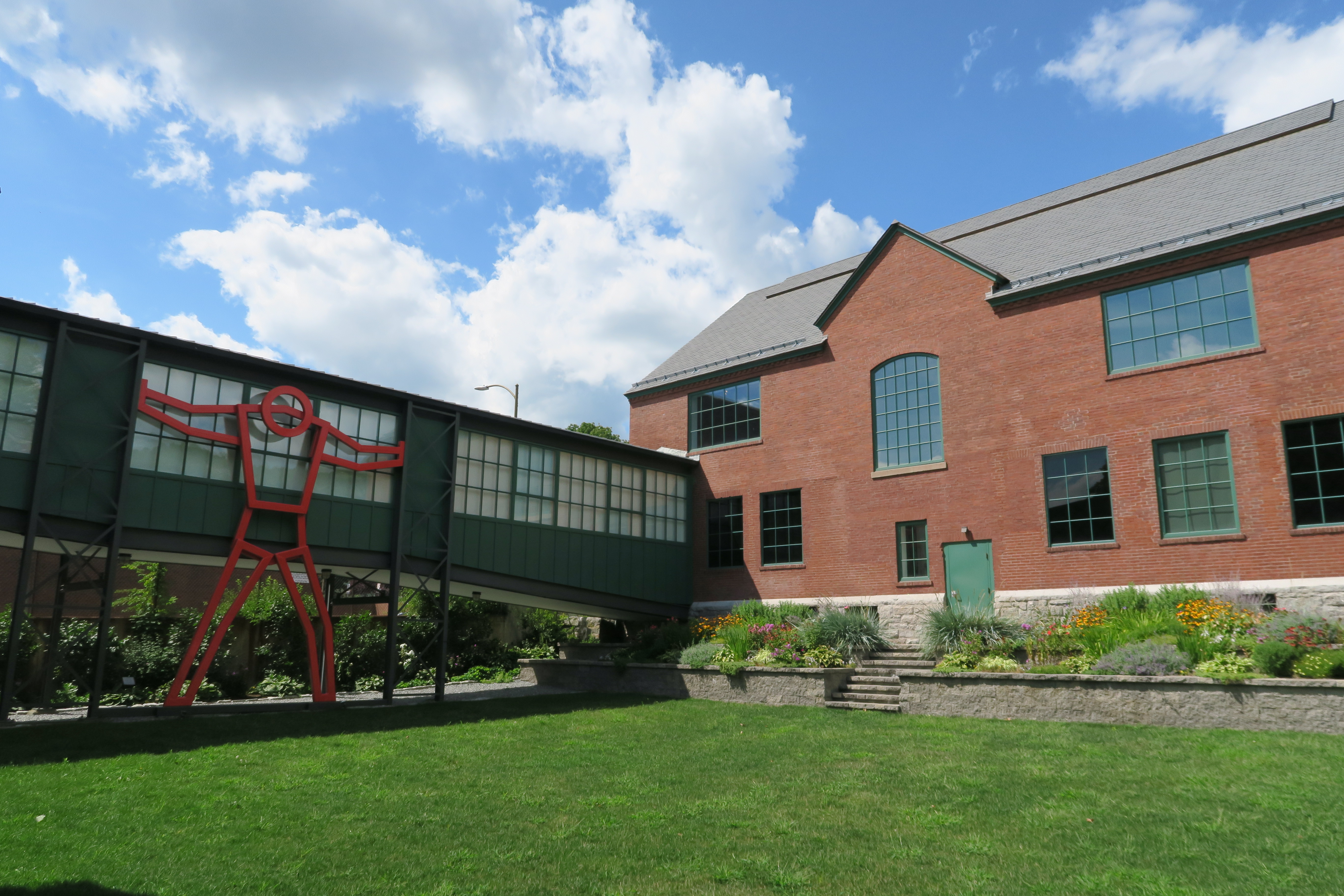
Courtyard and bridge connecting the Simonds and Merriam Parkway buildings, Fitchburg Art Museum

The Fitchburg Art Museum serves the cities of Fitchburg and Leominster, along with the surrounding communities in north-central Massachusetts and southern New Hampshire. FAM was founded in 1925 through a bequest of artist, collector, and educator Eleanor Norcross. The museum was designed by Mary Almy and opened its galleries to the public in the Merriam Parkway Building in downtown Fitchburg on April 17, 1929.

The museum's complex of four interconnected buildings, with more than 20,000 square feet (1,900 m^{2}) of exhibition and educational space, features exhibitions from FAM's permanent collections plus special loan exhibitions focused on regional contemporary art. Its permanent collection includes more than 7,000 artworks, including works by Fitchburg-based artists Eleanor Norcross, Samuel Adams, and Constance Bigelow. Collection strengths include American art and photography and African art, including Ancient Egyptian art. The Egyptian collection is presented in an interactive gallery designed for families and school groups. Admission is free for all visitors.

In 2012, FAM began its rotating contemporary New England artist exhibition program, connecting the strength of its historical collections with contemporary art practices. There is also an annual survey show featuring the recent work of many living New England artists, including numerous artworks for sale. Each temporary exhibition is accompanied by an interactive educational exhibit in the Learning Lounge, where visitors of all ages can learn about what they are seeing in the galleries and better understand their own reactions to the exhibits.

== Bilingual Initiative ==
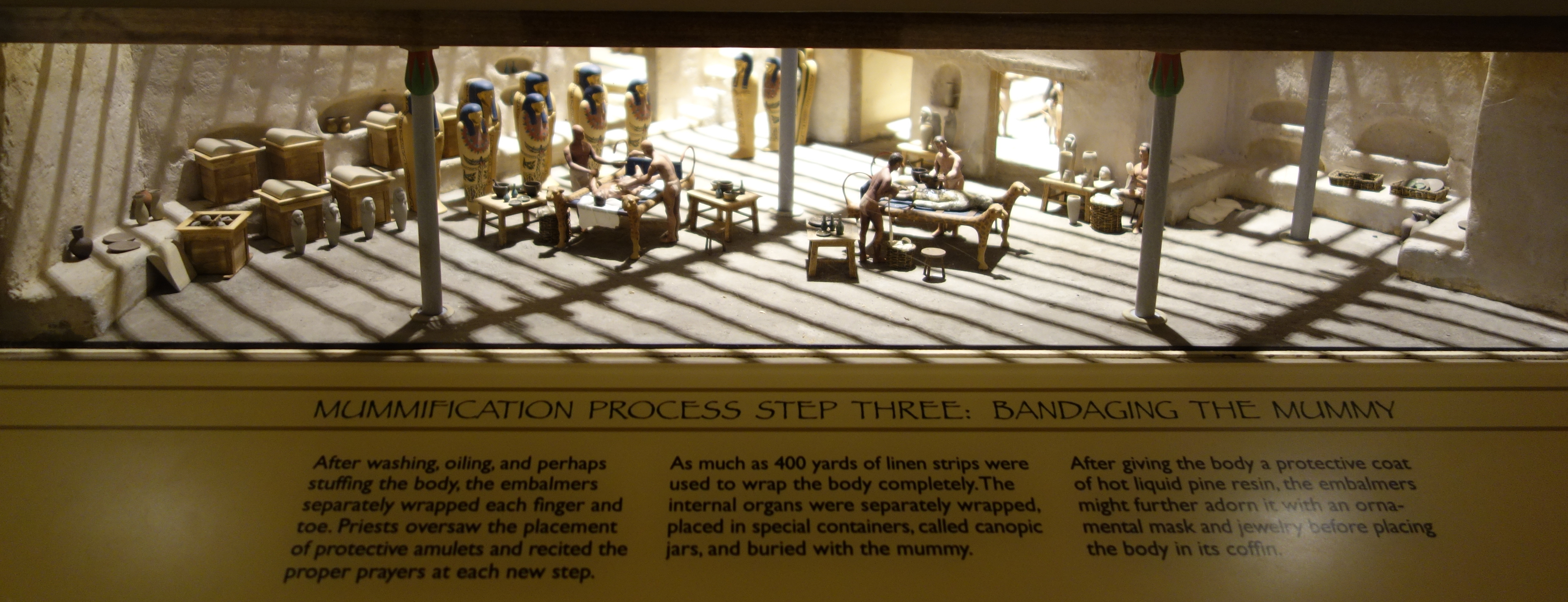
Mummification artwork at the Fitchburg Art Museum

FAM is continuing to work towards a goal of becoming New England's first fully bilingual (English/Spanish) art museum. Going forward, all new permanent collection displays, changing exhibitions, and bilingual educational texts and object labels will be accompanied by associated in-gallery education spaces. FAM also hired a bilingual receptionist. As it continues to develop this program over the next few years, FAM planned to incorporate bilingual printed materials, a website, social media, and docent tours. FAM was assisted in this effort by a local Latino Community Advisory Committee and by the Cleghorn Neighborhood Association, the primary service organization for Fitchburg's Latino and Latino Immigrant communities.

This Bilingual Museum Initiative stemmed from FAM's goal to become one of the best community museums in the US, providing cultural and educational enrichment to the entire community. In Fitchburg, 39% of the population is Latino (primarily from Puerto Rico, the Dominican Republic, and Uruguay), and 55% of children enrolled in the Fitchburg Public Schools come from homes where Spanish is the primary language. Fitchburg far exceeded both the Massachusetts and national percentages for the Latino population.

As of 2026, according to the Worcester Telegram & Gazette, FAM is one of the nation's few fully bilingual art museums, with all exhibition text available in English and Spanish.
