= Howe, Manning & Almy, Inc. =

Howe, Manning & Almy, Inc. was an American architectural firm in Boston, Massachusetts that was formed in 1926 by three women, all graduates of the Massachusetts Institute of Technology. It was one of the first architectural firms founded by women in the United States. Lois Lilley Howe began her own firm in 1900. She partnered with another MIT alum, Eleanor Manning O'Connor, in 1913, creating the firm of Lois Lilley, Howe & Manning. Mary Almy joined the firm in 1926 and the name became Howe, Manning & Almy, Inc. In 1937, the firm dissolved after Howe retired, and Manning and Almy began their own practices.

Though the firm designed some commercial and government projects, it specialized in domestic architecture. This is in line with early twentieth century beliefs that women were best suited for domestic projects due to their sex. Howe, Manning, and Almy were Revivalists and their designs often mimicked Tudor, Georgian, and American Colonial styles. When designing a project, they considered how the plan would affect the daily life of its inhabitants and were unafraid to break from stylistic conventions to make a plan more simple and comfortable. Their plans were logical and designed to blend in with the surrounding buildings and utilized traditional materials such as wood, brick, and stucco. Howe, Manning, and Almy preferred to reuse materials from other projects, or renovate a home rather than designing a new one in order to reduce costs.

== Works ==
Commission no.	Building name	Year constructed	Location	Still standing?	Reference
226	Business Women's Club	1912	Boston		
334	Louis C. Cornish House	1916	15 Fayerweather St., Cambridge, MA		
	Elinor Prudden Home	1830, 1925 restoration	36 Cove Street, Duxbury, MA	Yes	
	Old Harbor Village (now called the Mary Ellen McCormack housing project)	1937	South Boston	Yes	

== See also ==
- Florence Ward Stiles
