= Royal E. Robbins School =

- U.S. National Register of Historic Places
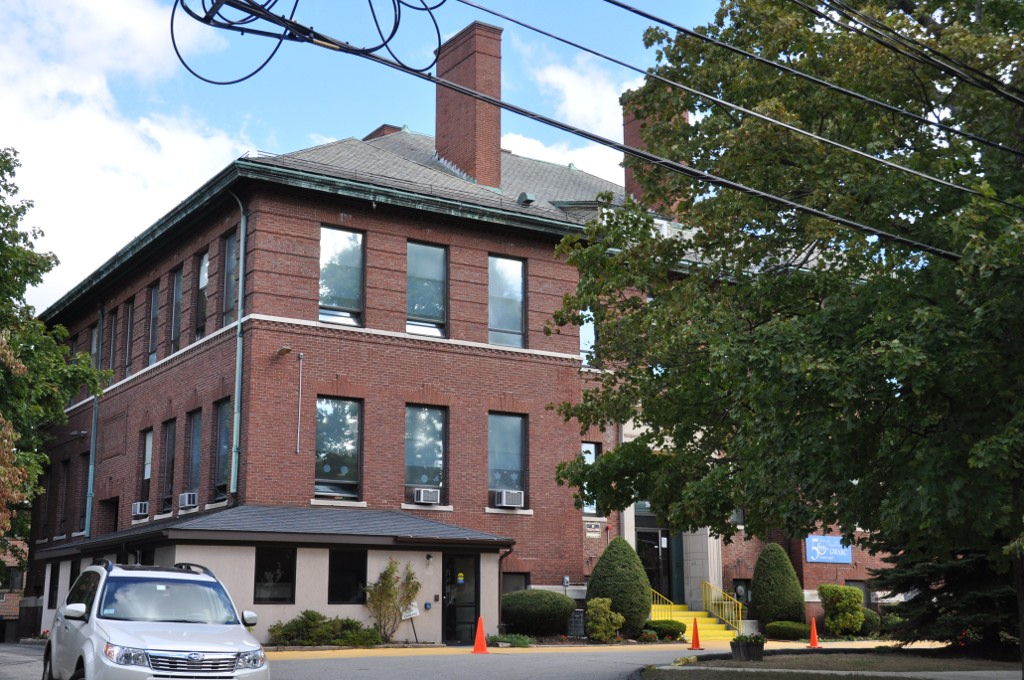

- Location within Massachusetts Location within the United States
- Location: 58 Chestnut St., Waltham, Massachusetts
- Coordinates: 42°22′08.8″N 71°14′19.5″W
- Built: 1901
- Architect: Patch, Samuel
- Architectural style: Colonial Revival, Georgian Revival
- MPS: Waltham MRA
- NRHP reference No.: 89001496
- Added to NRHP: September 28, 1989

The Royal E. Robbins School is a historic school building at 58 Chestnut Street in Waltham, Massachusetts. The two story brick Georgian Revival building was built in 1901, during a period of rapid growth on the city's South Side. It is named for Royal E. Robbins, a major figure in the founding of the Waltham Watch Company, a major economic force in that area. It is now a community center.

The building was listed on the National Register of Historic Places in 1989.

== See also ==
- National Register of Historic Places listings in Waltham, Massachusetts
