= Eleanor Manning O'Connor =

American architect

- Born: June 27, 1884; Lynn, Massachusetts
- Died: July 12, 1973 (aged 89); Mexico City
- Occupation: Architect
- Parent(s): Delia Josephine Grady; James Manning
- Projects: Old Harbor Housing Project, Village of Mariemont

Eleanor Manning O'Connor (June 27, 1884 – July 12, 1973) was an American architect and educator passionate about the creation of decent public housing for all.

== Early life and education ==
Eleanor Manning O'Connor was born in 1884 to Delia Josephine Grady and James Manning, a building contractor in Lynn, Massachusetts. Her father was the son of Irish immigrants, John Manning and Ellen Horgan. Eleanor attended Lynn Classical High School. She received an S.B. degree in architecture from M.I.T. in 1906 with a thesis entitled "Design for a Country Residence." She served as the president of Cleofan, MIT's club for women, in her senior year.

== Architectural practice ==
Two years after graduation, O'Connor accepted a position as a draftsman with another architect and MIT graduate, Lois Lilley Howe. In 1912, she took an extended leave of absence and traveled in Europe with her associate and classmate Eliza J. Newkirk Rogers, creating watercolors of the buildings she observed. She cut short the trip to accept an offer of partnership from Howe and joined the firm calling themselves Howe and Manning, America's fourth firm of female architects, later Howe, Manning & Almy, Inc. The firm frequently worked on remodeling and renovating outdated structures and O'Connor coined the term "renovising" to describe their work.

In the 1920s, O'Connor worked with Lois Howe and other architects on the Village of Mariemont, a planned community in Hamilton County, Ohio.

During this period one of her major works was a commission from WPA for low-cost housing in an Irish neighborhood in South Boston called the Old Harbor Housing Project, constructed 1933–1938. She worked with other architects in a collaboration known as the Seventeen Associated Architects. This project, consisting of three story apartments and two story townhouses was distinguished for its residential appeal as compared to the sterile atmosphere of most public housing. Biographer Doris Cole says that O'Connor was the partner most concerned about social issues and her concerns reflected the detailing, choice of materials and attention to proportion that contribute to the appeal of the project. Subsequently, O'Connor served on numerous housing commissions and councils at the city, state and national levels.

== Educator ==
After WWI, O'Connor began lecturing at Simmons College as a Special Instructor of Architecture and later of Housing, a position that she held for 50 years . During the 1930s she also taught at Pine Manor Junior College, Chamberlain School for Retailing, and Garland College. She lectured frequently in the New England area on housing throughout her career.

== Collaboration with Johnson O'Connor ==
In 1931, Eleanor Manning married the American psychometrician, researcher, and educator Johnson O'Connor, founder of the Johnson O'Connor Research Foundation. At the foundation, she championed the causes of women and encouraged women to enter into the fields of engineering, medicines and science.

O'Connor died in Mexico in 1973 while researching Indian cultures and is buried beside her husband in Newport Beach, California. She was survived by O'Connor's engineer son, Chadwell O'Connor.

== Writings ==
- Eleanor Manning, "Architecture as a Profession for Women", "Simmons Review", Simmons College, April 1934, 71–75
- Eleanor Manning, "Buildings for the National Welfare", National Altrusan, March 1935.

== See also ==
- Howe, Manning & Almy, Inc.
