= Roughwood (Brookline, Massachusetts) =

Historic house in Massachusetts, United States

- U.S. National Register of Historic Places
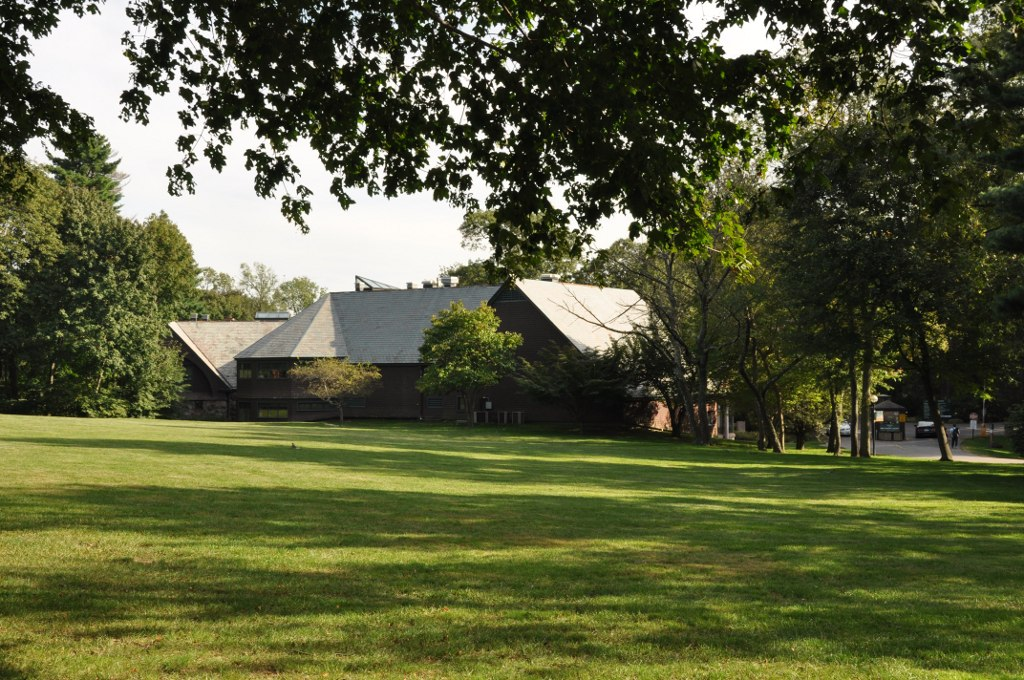

- Location within Massachusetts Location within the United States
- Location: 400 Heath St., Brookline, Massachusetts
- Coordinates: 42°19′13″N 71°9′30″W
- Area: 79 acres (32 ha)
- Architect: Andrews, Jaques and Rantoul
- Architectural style: Shingle Style
- MPS: Brookline MRA
- NRHP reference No.: 85003309
- Added to NRHP: October 17, 1985

Roughwood is a historic estate at 400 Heath Street in Brookline, Massachusetts. It is currently the main campus of Messina College (formerly known as Pine Manor College). The main estate house and outbuildings were designed by Andrews, Jaques and Rantoul, and built in 1891 as the summer estate of William Cox, a wholesale dealer in the footwear industry. The estate house is one of the largest Shingle-style houses in Brookline. The property was reduced in size by sales of land to the adjacent country club, and for the establishment of Dane Park; the estate was acquired by Pine Manor College in 1961, which retained the estate's rural flavor.

It was added to the National Register of Historic Places in 1985.

== See also ==
- National Register of Historic Places listings in Brookline, Massachusetts
