= Mighels =

Mighels is a surname:

- Nellie Verrill Mighels Davis (1844–1945), US civic leader and journalist; her first husband was Henry Rust Mighels
- Henry Rust Mighels, (1830–1879), US journalist and politician
- James Mighels, British Naval officer, commanded in 1719
- Jesse Wedgwood Mighels (1795–1861), US malacologist
- Philip Verrill Mighels (1869–1911), American Writer
- Ella Sterling Mighels (1853–1934), American writer and historian
