= John Franklin Swift =

American politician

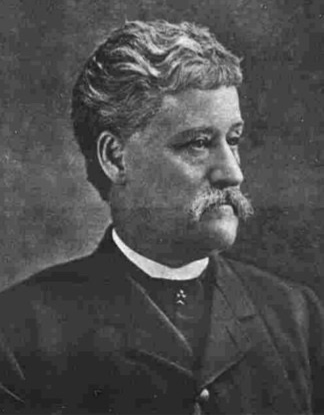
Swift, circa 1891

John Franklin Swift (February 28, 1829 – March 10, 1891) was an American politician and author. Swift was a Republican member of the California State Assembly. He represented the 8th district (County of San Francisco) in 1863 and 1873-75. In 1875, he ran as an independent for congress, but lost to William A. Piper. He later represented the 13th District from 1877 to 1880. In 1886, he ran for Governor of California, but lost to Democrat Washington Montgomery Bartlett.

Along with Newton Booth, Swift formed an Independent Republican party whose platform was dominated by an anti-monopoly plank.

Swift served as the United States Envoy Extraordinary and Minister Plenipotentiary to Japan from 1889 to 1891.

== Biography ==
Swift was born in Bowling Green, Kentucky, and died in Tokyo, Japan, but spent most of his career in San Francisco, California. Swift was admitted to the California bar in 1857. He worked for the U.S. Land Office from 1865-1866. He was appointed to serve as a regent for the University of California from 1872-88. In 1888, Swift was the delegate-at-large to the Republican National Convention.

In 1867 Swift travelled on the USS Quaker City to the Holy City, the trip that Mark Twain made famous in his book Innocents Abroad. Swift's version of this journey is captured in his book Going to Jericho; or, Sketches of Travel in Spain and the East.

As a legislator, Swift wrote provisions in the California State Constitution which gave the county board of supervisors the authority to control water rates. In June, 1880, as a member of the treaty commission to China headed by James Burrill Angell, U.S. Chief Chinese Negotiator, Swift traveled with fellow commission member William Henry Trescot and Angell to Peking (now Beijing), China. The result was the Angell Treaty of 1880 which limited the Burlingame Treaty of 1868. The Angell Treaty regulated and limited the immigration of Chinese laborers to the United States but did not prohibit it outright. It separated U.S. trade interests from the immigration issue, and made a legal opening for an exclusion law.

In Chae Chan Ping v. the United States, Swift and LA District Attorney Stephen M. White on behalf of California succeeded in moving the U.S. Supreme Court to uphold the constitutionality of the Chinese Exclusion Act, 1888.

== Publications ==
He is considered one of the writers of the Sagebrush School with Joseph T. Goodman, Mark Twain, Fred H. Hart, Henry Rust Mighels, Dan DeQuille, Samuel Post Davis, John Franklin Swift, Charles Carroll Goodwin, Joseph Wasson, Rollin M. Daggett. and others.

Bret Hart commented that "of the three humorous writers: Twain, Miller, and Swift, the last was the greatest genius.

- Going to Jericho; or, Sketches of Travel in Spain and the East (1868)
- Grant And Wilson: Speech Of The Hon. John F. Swift, Delivered At Platt's Hall, July 9, 1872
- Robert Greathouse: An American Novel (1870)
- Robert Greathouse: A Story Of The Nevada Silver Mines (1878)
- The Present and Future of the University (1887)
- California a Republican state: Address to the Republicans of California (1888)

== Personal ==
Swift's father was Nathan Williamson Swift and his mother was Sarah "Sallie" Campbell.

Swift was married to suffragist and clubwoman Mary A. Wood (1841–1927), daughter of Emily Morrell and William Wood.

Party political offices
Preceded by Morris M. Estee	Republican nominee for Governor of California; 1886	Succeeded by Henry Markham
Political offices
Preceded by ?	California State Assemblyman, 8th District; 1863	Succeeded by ?
Preceded by ?	California State Assemblyman, 8th District; 1873-1875	Succeeded by ?
Preceded by ?	California State Assemblyman, 13th District; 1877-1880	Succeeded by ?
