= Samuel Davis =

Samuel or Sam Davis may refer to:

- Samuel Davis (orientalist) (1760–1819), British orientalist and amateur artist
- Samuel Davis (American politician) (1774–1831), U.S. representative from Massachusetts
- Samuel Davis (Louisiana planter) (1780s–1853), American slave owner and land speculator
- Samuel Davis (Canadian politician) (1914–1996), Canadian politician, mayor of Saint John, New Brunswick
- Samuel H. Davis (civil rights leader) (1810–?), American religious and civil rights leader
- Samuel Howard Davis (1896–1921), pilot and namesake for Davis-Monthan Air Force Base
- Samuel Post Davis (1850–1918), American journalist and politician
- Samuel W. Davis (1845–?), American Civil War sailor and Medal of Honor recipient
- Sam Davis (1842–1863), Confederate States Army soldier, "Boy Hero of the Confederacy"
- Sam Davis (American football) (1944–2019), American football player
- Sam Davis (footballer) (1890–?), English footballer
- Sammy Davis (footballer) (1900–1988), English footballer
- Sammy Davis Sr. (1900–1988), American dancer, father of Sammy Davis, Jr.
- Sammy Davis Jr. (1925–1990), American entertainer
- Sam Davis (rugby league) (born 1998), English rugby footballer

== See also ==
- Sammy Davis (disambiguation)
- Samuel Davies (disambiguation)
- Sam Davies (disambiguation)
