= Sagebrush School =

American literary school of thought

- Cultural origins: American Old West
- Features: Hoaxes, wit, audacity, irreverent attitude

Subgenres
- Drama, essays, fiction, history, humor, journalism, memoirs, and poetry

Regional scenes
- Nevada Territory, California

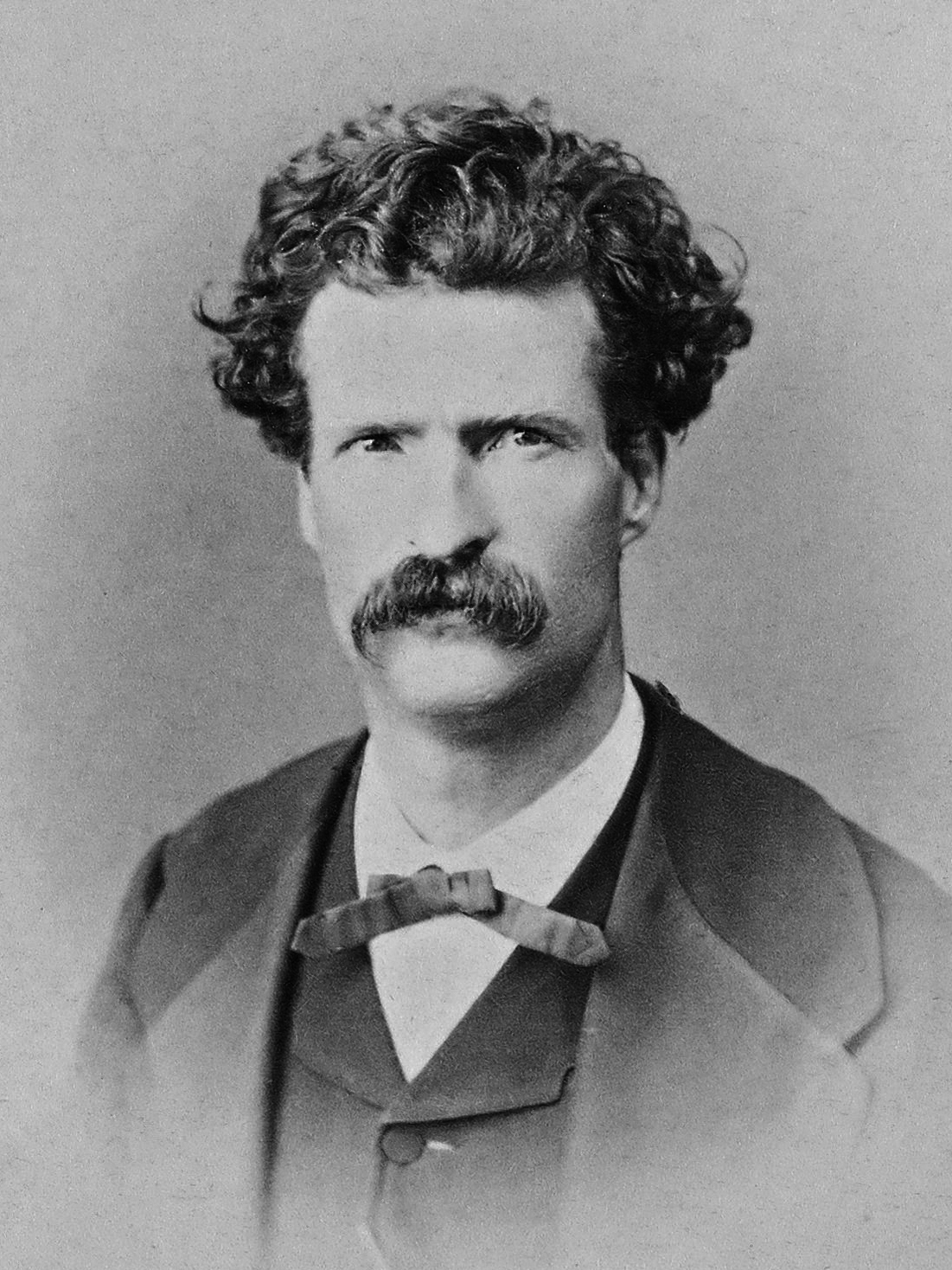
Mark Twain was the most notable of the Sagebrush School writers.

The Sagebrush School was the literary movement written primarily by men of Nevada. The sagebrush shrub is prevalent in the state. It was a broad-based movement as it included various literary genres such as drama, essays, fiction, history, humor, journalism, memoirs, and poetry. The name Sagebrush School was coined by Ella Sterling Mighels, who stated:

Sagebrush school? Why not? Nothing in all our Western literature so distinctly savors of the soil as the characteristic books written by the men of Nevada and that interior part of the State where the sagebrush grows.

The roots of the movement were in the American Old West. The Sagebrush School was the main contributor to American literature from Nevada's mining frontier during the period of 1859 to 1914. There were several characteristics of this movement that distinguished it from others, such as literary talent; these authors were known to be intelligent and accomplished writers. The style included hoaxes, wit, audacity, or an irreverent attitude. The inspiration for the movement began with Joseph T. Goodman of the Virginia City, Nevada Territory's Territorial Enterprise. The most notable of the Sagebrush School writers, and a Territorial Enterprise journalist, was Mark Twain. In 2009, the Sagebrush School was inducted into the Nevada Writers Hall of Fame.

== Writers ==
- Samuel Clemens (Mark Twain)
- Rollin M. Daggett
- Samuel Post Davis
- Alfred R. Doten
- Thomas Fitch
- James W. Gally
- Joseph T. Goodman
- Charles Carroll Goodwin
- Fred H. Hart
- Sarah Winnemucca Hopkins
- Denis E. McCarthy
- Arthur McEwen
- Henry Rust Mighels
- John Franklin Swift
- James William Emery Townsend
- Joseph Wasson
- William Wright (Dan DeQuille)

== Anthologies ==
- Basso, Dave, Sagebrush Chronicles (1971)
- Witschi, Nicolas S. (ed.), The Sagebrush Anthology: Literature from the Silver Age of the Old West (2006)
