= Philip Verrill Mighels =

American poet (1869–1911)

Philip Verrill Mighels

Philip Verrill Mighels (April 19, 1869 – October 12, 1911) was an American writer and novelist. His early poems, short stories, and several of his novels, including his best-selling Bruvver Jim’s Baby and The Furnace of Gold, are part of the Sagebrush School of American literature. He was also a versatile and prolific author, recognized for his science fiction novels, romances, and political commentary. Less-known are his detective novels (published under the pseudonym of Jack Steele).

== Career ==
He was born and raised in Carson City, Nevada, a younger son of pioneer journalists Henry Rust Mighels and Nellie Verrill Mighels Davis. Tutored to be a lawyer by his stepfather, Samuel Post Davis, he passed the Nevada bar in 1890, but moved to San Francisco, California to pursue a career in journalism and as a writer. After his mid-1890s move to New York City, his popularity grew with stories—on cowboys and prospectors, lost civilizations and ape-men, detectives and automobiles, and questions on race, modern sex, and political commentary—serialized in newspapers and major magazines such as Harpers, Saturday Evening Post, Cosmopolitan, and McClures. Over a dozen of these serialized works were published as novels. His most popular novels, Bruvver Jim's Baby and The Furnace of Gold, were set in desert mining camps during Nevada's early twentieth-century mining boom, with touches of humor, romantic Westerners, and sagebrush country characters. After his death, at least two of his works were made into silent movies (Subterfuge, 1912, and If Only Jim, with Harry Carey, 1920).

Between 1897 and 1901, he and his wife Ella lived in London, in the Bloomsbury district. After returning to the United States they resided in California and, primarily, New York City, with visits to his Nevada home for research trips. While gathering material on the cattle round-up at the Bliss Ranch in Nevada he accidentally shot himself. He died four days later at nearby Winnemucca, at age 42. He is buried near his parents in Carson City's Lone Mountain Cemetery.

One early Nevada historian stated that Phil Mighells, “probably the most brilliant creative genius of the younger set, was a voluminous writer, contributing to almost every branch of literature.”

== Personal life ==
On June 17, 1896, at age 27, he married the 43 year old widow Ella Sterling Cummins, a respected California author. Ella Sterling Mighels described early California writers and literature in her 1893 book Story of the Files, which included text by Mighels. He credited her with much of his shift from a regional to national writer (their courtship is romanticized in his book of poems, Out of a Silver Flute [1896]). He purchased the Bowers Mansion, a National Historic Landmark north of Carson City for a summer home, but they lived there briefly. In 1909, she sought a divorce (granted in 1910) for desertion; she preferred living in California, he preferred New York City. In August 1910, he married Julia Frances Bartlett Weaver (1865-1952), a native of Connecticut. He had no children.

== Partial works ==
- Mother Goose Up to Date, 1895, illustrated by the author
- Out of a Silver Flute, 1896
- Nella, the Heart of the Army, 1900
- The Crystal Sceptre, a Story of Adventure, 1901
- When a Witch is Young, 1901
- The Inevitable, 1903
- Bruvver Jim’s Baby, 1904
- The King of the Missing Links, 1904, revision of The Crystal Sceptre
- The Ultimate Passion, 1905
- Chatwit, the Man-talk Bird, 1906
- Dunny, a Mountain Romance, 1906
- Adventures with Indians, 1908, contributor
- The Pillars of Eden, 1909
- The Furnace of Gold, 1910
- Thurley Ruxton, 1911
- As it was in the Beginning, 1912
- Hearts of Grace, 1913, revision of When a Witch is Young
- Novels published under pseudonym Jack Steele: Nothing Else, 1908, A Husband by Proxy, 1909, The House of Iron Men, 1911
