= Joseph T. Goodman =

American journalist, writer, and epigrapher (1838–1917)

Joseph Thompson Goodman (September 18, 1838 – October 1, 1917) was an American journalist, writer, and epigrapher. During the Comstock silver boom in Virginia City, Nevada, he was owner and editor of the Territorial Enterprise, one of the largest and most influential newspapers on the West Coast. He hired Samuel Clemens as a reporter for the paper, giving Clemens his "start" as a professional writer. He later became interested in deciphering Maya inscriptions and made significant contributions in the field.

== Life ==
Goodman was born on September 18, 1838, in Masonville, New York. In 1856 he moved to California with his father and began working as a typesetter at The Golden Era, a leading literary newspaper in San Francisco. In less than five years he became the owner and editor of the Territorial Enterprise in Virginia City, Nevada. Goodman grew the Enterprise from a struggling local paper into one of the preeminent west coast newspapers with a national following. It was known for its expert reporting on the mining industry, its literary quality, and its editorial stances against corruption in business and government.

The Enterprise was financially independent and Goodman was fearless in his editorial stances. Early on he exposed the corruption of the Nevada Territory Supreme Court and forced the entire bench to resign. He denounced the formation of a diamond-mining corporation as a swindle that was soon to be exposed as the diamond hoax of 1872. In 1872 he opposed the US Senate candidacy of William Sharon, one of the wealthiest and most ruthless financiers in the Comstock. Sharon lost the election, in large part due to Goodman's opposition. In 1874 when he was going to run again for the Senate, Sharon bought the Enterprise from Goodman to ensure his successful candidacy.

In 1862, Goodman hired Samuel Clemens as a local reporter. Although Clemens had published short stories previously, his work under Goodman's editorship at the Territorial Enterprise was credited with giving the author his initial "start" due to the extensive circulation of the newspaper. Goodman and Clemens became friends and corresponded for many years. In 1871 Goodman visited Clemens in New York to assist him with the composition of Roughing It.

The Enterprise formed the nucleus of a group of writers that would eventually become known as the Sagebrush School of literature. Goodman himself was a writer in this tradition along with Clemens, Dan DeQuille, Rollin M. Daggett and several other writers who worked in Virginia City at some point in their careers. In 1870 Goodman travelled to Europe and sent back letters to the Enterprise detailing his experiences. They were published on the front page under the title, "Somewhat from Abroad (From an Irregular Correspondent)."

In 1871, Goodman and Rollin M. Daggett coauthored the play The Psychoscope. In 1872 the play ran for one brief engagement in Virginia City. It starred John McCullough along with the touring cast of the California Theatre. The play exceeded Victorian sensibilities by portraying the inner workings of a brothel, and was never again presented in the 19th century.

Goodman sold his Virginia City newspaper in 1874, returned to San Francisco and took a seat on the Pacific Stock Exchange. He made a fortune in various mining investments including a silver mine he purchased with John P. Jones. He also continued to work as a journalist and writer, becoming managing editor of the San Francisco Post and founding The San Franciscan, a distinguished literary magazine.

Later, in the early 1880s, Goodman purchased a large raisin vineyard near Fresno and lived there several years. During that time he became interested in the glyphs of the ancient Mayas and devoted many years to deciphering them. Goodman gave credit to Gustavus A. Eisen for directing his attention to the problems of the Maya inscriptions and calendar. Eisen was a scientist at the California Academy of Sciences and also owned a vineyard in the Fresno area. With Eisen's encouragement, professional contacts, and research materials, Goodman set to work.

His research was initially guided by previously published research as well as photographic documentation of molds and glyphs. Most of the photographs were supplied by Alfred Maudslay, an English archaeologist who made significant contributions to Central American archeology. His most important breakthrough occurred when he came across the Relación de las cosas de Yucatán by Bishop Diego de Landa, written in 1566 but never published until 1864 when it was uncovered by the French antiquarian, Brasseur de Bourbourg.

Goodman spent 12 years puzzling over the glyphs and ultimately determined that more than half of the inscriptions were related to mathematics and the Maya calendar. One of his most important contributions was the calculation of a correlation between the Maya calendar and the Gregorian calendar. This became the basis for the Goodman-Martinez-Thompson correlation. Goodman had hoped that the California Academy of Sciences would publish his findings but they declined. Instead, Maudslay arranged to include it as an appendix to his volume on Maya archaeology, published in 1897.

In 1897, Goodman moved to Alameda, California, where he resided until his death on October 1, 1917.
