= Sam Davies =

Sam Davies may refer to:

- Sam Davies (cricketer) (born 1992), Welsh cricketer
- Sam Davies (footballer, born 1894) (1894–1972), Welsh footballer
- Sam Davies (footballer, born 1870) (1870–1913), English footballer
- Sam Davies (rugby union) (born 1993), Welsh rugby union player
- Sam Davies (sailor) (born 1974), British yachtswoman
- Sam Davies (sprinter) (born 1979), British sprint athlete

== See also ==
- Samantha Davies (disambiguation)
- Samuel Davies (disambiguation)
- Sam Davis (1842–1863), American Confederate army soldier
- Sammy Davis (disambiguation)
- Samuel Davis (disambiguation)
