= Comstock Chronicle =

Newspaper published in Virginia City, Nevada

- Type: Weekly newspaper
- Owner(s): Comstock Foundation for History and Culture
- Founder(s): William L. Jernegan; Alfred James
- Editor: Steph Norby
- Founded: 1858 (as the Territorial Enterprise)
- Language: English
- City: Virginia City, Nevada
- Sister newspapers: Dayton Valley Dispatch
- ISSN: 0896-9353
- Website: thecomstockchronicle.com

The Comstock Chronicle is a weekly newspaper published in Virginia City, Nevada. It originated in 1858 as the Territorial Enterprise, which featured notable contributions from author Mark Twain with writer Dan DeQuille.

== History ==
=== Territorial Enterprise (1858–1916) ===
==== Initial run (1858–1893) ====
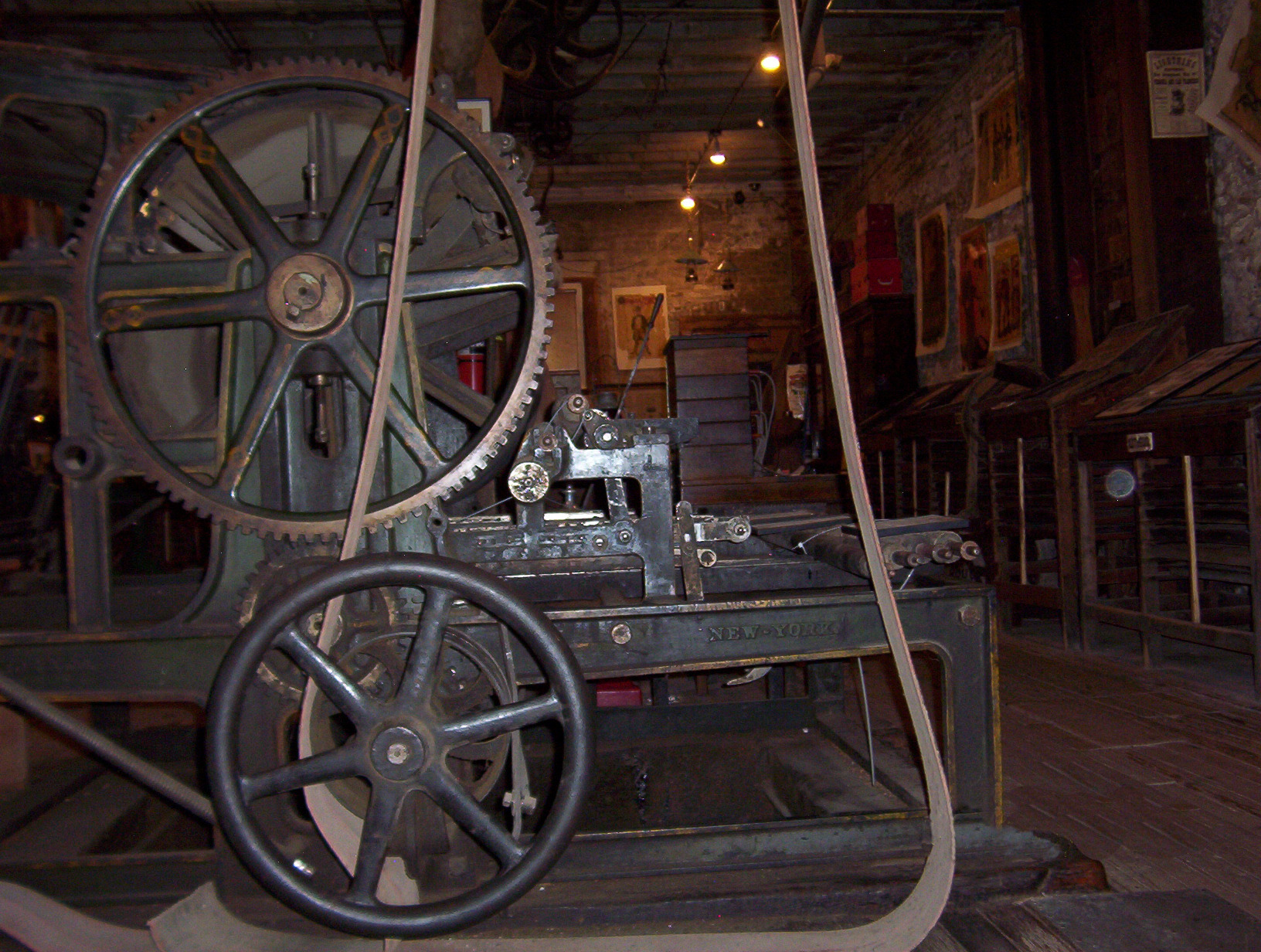
Antique printing press powered by flat-belt, overhead line shaft, at the Mark Twain Museum in Virginia City.

On Dec. 18, 1858, William L. Jernegan and Alfred James published the first edition of the Territorial Enterprise in Genoa, Nevada. In August 1859, Jonathan Williams took over for James as editor. That November, Williams and J. B. Woolard purchased and relocated the paper to Carson City, Nevada. In March 1860, Frank Soule became co-owner, and that June he sold his half-stake to Dr. Henry DeGroot. In September 1860, the Enterprise relocated again, this time to Virginia City, Nevada.

In December 1861, Joseph T. Goodman and Dennis E. McCarthy assumed control of the Enterprise from Williams. The two were responsible for hiring Mark Twain and Dan DeQuille. While DeQuille worked at the Enterprise for 31 years, Twain only stayed for 22 months. In November 1862, Denis "Jerry" Discoll bought in as a third partner. In June 1863, the paper acquired a double cylinder press, allowing the page count to expand to 9 per issue. In September 1863, Goodman dueled Thomas Fitch, editor of the Virginia City Union, shooting him in the leg and walking away injured. In November 1863, Discoll sold his one-third stake to the other partners. In July 1864, Goodman and McCarthy entered the office of H.C. Bennett, owner of the Washoe Herald, and at gunpoint demanded a retraction. A brawl ensued, but no one was seriously injured.

In October 1865, McCarthy sold out to Goodman. In January 1874, Goodman sold the paper to William Sharon who hired Rollin M. Daggett as managing editor. In October 1875, a large fire destroyed Virginia City, including the paper's office. The paper's own archive was lost. Luckily, the county recorder of Lyon County, Nevada had preserved its own archive of every Enterprise paper. In December 1875, Charles Carroll Goodwin succeeded Daggett as editor. In May 1880, Goodwin left to edit The Salt Lake Tribune. The editors that followed were Boynton Carlisle, Fred Hart, H.G. Shaw, John W. Whitcher, and lastly, Jesse Taggart. In January 1893, the paper was suspended.

==== First revival (1893–1916) ====
In December 1893, a corporation revived the paper and leased it to John E. McKinnon. In 1896, Frank J. Norris and Francis A. "Frank" Blake took over the lease. In 1898, Norris left the paper. In 1899, John Craise became co-publisher. In 1908, Craise grew ill and died. In 1916, Blake sold Enterprise to Lyman N. Clark who absorbed into the Virginia Chronicle.

=== Virginia City Chronicle (1871-1927) ===
On April 8, 1872, John I. Ginn and E.F Bean published the first edition of the Virginia Evening Chronicle. In 1875, Dennis E. McCarthy, formerly of the Enterprise, bought the paper. He was an Australia-native and published the paper until his death in 1885. His widow Mrs. Elizabeth F. McCarthy died in 1887. The couple's children then leased the Chronicle to John H. Coleman and Edward D. Blake. Coleman immigrated from Cork, Ireland and initially came to Virginia City to work as the paper's bookkeeper. He died in 1901. Blake and J.L. Considine passed the lease to J. Marshall Davis in 1903, who died in 1906. Lyman N. Clark leased the paper from Blake in 1909 and worked as co-editor alongside Davis' widow. Clark eventually acquired ownership, and published the Chronicle until it went out of business in 1927.

=== The Budget & Virginia City News (1927–1952) ===
A few weeks after the Chronicle shuttered, James T. Huling launched a new paper in Virginia City called The Budget, also known as the Monday Budget. In 1929, Huling was seriously injured and hospitalized after falling 10 feet off a platform. Ownership was then transferred to WWI veteran Vincent C. Nevin, who renamed the paper to the Virginia City News. In 1942, Nevin died. Ed Blake then took over as publisher for a few months until the News was acquired at public auction by Doug H. Tandy in 1943, who died later that year. In 1944, Wesley Davis Jr. bought the News from the Tandy estate. Later that year, Davis acquired the Nevada Appeal. In 1947, Larry Reed bought the News from Davis. In 1952, the paper was sold and the new owners relaunched it as the Territorial Enterprise.

=== Enterprise revival attempts ===
==== Second revival (1946) ====
In August 1945, Phil Dorst, who bought and reestablished the Old Washoe Club, purchased the Enterprise building from Mrs. Frank Blake and announced plans to renovate it into a museum. That December, Dorst announced plans to revive the Territorial Enterprise newspaper after it ceased 26 years with Jock Taylor as editor. Work began on renovating the paper's old building for use as editorial offices. However, the property ultimately became a tourist attraction home to a couple of slot machines and a Mark Twain exhibit. In February 1946, Dorst transferred ownership of the paper to his wife, Helen Crawford Dorst. On March 13, Mrs. Dorst published the first edition of her six-page, biweekly paper out of her temporary office in Carson City. Content primarily consisted of historical essays aimed at tourists. This version of the Enterprise ceased after seven issues, the last published on June 12.

==== Third revival (1952–1970) ====
In 1952, about 36 years after its closure, railroad historian Lucius Beebe and his long-time companion and co-author Charles Clegg bought the Virginia City News and revived it as the Territorial Enterprise. The two paid $5,500 for the paper, well over the $1,200 asking price, and planned to invest $15,00 to expand and modernize operations. Each press run would have 6,000. Subscriptions were doubled soon after the purchase from 200 to 600, with prices doubling to $5 a year. The revived paper would feature a history column and emphasize mining news.

Clegg purchased antique ornate typefaces that gave the paper a distinct look. Within two years, the Enterprise had the largest circulation of any weekly west of the Mississippi River, with readers in every U.S. state and 16 countries. In 1954, Beebe published a history book he wrote on the early days of the Enterprise titled "Comstock Commotion: The Story of The Territorial Enterprise."

In 1960, Beebe and Clegg sold the Enterprise to the paper's landlord so they could focus more time on writing. Roy Shelter, a souvenir shop operator who owned the paper's office, was the new owner. In 1961, New York newsman Jack Tell mortgaged his house, ransacked his life savings and borrowed money from friends to buy the Enterprise for $60,000. His 22-year-old son Donald was hired at the paper. Managing editor Rob Richards stayed on, but he and the paper's circulation manager quit after six weeks in protest after Tell fired Richard's wife. Daniel Boone, formerly of the Sparks Tribune, briefly took over for Richards.

In 1965, L. Lew Hardy, a publicist at Harvey's Casino, bought the Enterprise, and a few months later rehired Richards as managing editor. In March 1966, former general manager William E. Norris sued the paper for wrongful termination, seeking $1 million in damages. Norris also sued for defamation with regard to an obituary on Beebe published in a San Francisco paper that mentioned it was written by a discharged Enterprise employee. Hardy countersued for $700,000, and claimed the obituary wasn't his doing.

In July 1966, another lawsuit was filed against Hardy by state insurance commissioner Louis T. Matos, alleging Hardy and the other members of the board on an insurance company misappropriated $30,000 to spend on the Enterprise. Matos sought $1.6 million in damages. The hearing for this lawsuit was postponed due to Hardy's poor health, which also led him to sell the Enterprise. Matos attempted to stop the sale, but was unsuccessful. In April 1967, ownership was transferred to Jeff McGrew, formerly associated with the Sparks Tribune. McGrew planned to operate the paper, alongside the Enterprise museum and gift shop. In 1968, editor Richards died at age 57, and was well known for his popular Las Vegas column "Skeptic in the Desert."

In 1969, Dolores A. "Dee" Schaefer acquired the Enterprise museum and newspaper. She then leased the masthead to Clayton Darrah, owner of the Humboldt County Bulletin, who briefly published a localized edition of the Bulletin under the Enterprise name. Darrah declined to buy the name rights and the deal lapsed after a year. Thus, the Enterprise officially ceased again. Schaefer did publish and a single edition of the paper in 1975 to commemorate the Virginia City Fire, and again in 1976 to commemorate the U.S. Bicentennial. Over the years, others offered to restart the paper, but Schaefer declined them all due to lacking funds or qualifications.

==== Trademark legal dispute (1979–1983) ====
On March 2, 1979, Marilyn Newton, a photographer for the Reno Gazette-Journal, filed a trademark for Territorial Enterprise believing Schaefer had let the rights lapsed. Newton also obtained the Enterprise incorporation papers, which Schaefer did legally let them lapse. In July 1979, Ron D. Funk, owner the Santa Monica Evening Outlook, made an offer to Newton to relaunch the Enterprise, which she declined. Around that same time Funk made a similar offer to Schaefer, but while negotiating for the rights, came to believe they had lapsed since the publication had ceased. Funk then hired David Toll, ex-publisher of the Gold Hill News, to edit his relaunched Territorial Enterprise, set to print on Oct. 8, 1980, without Schaefer's involvement.

However, Funk and Toll had a falling out after Funk rejected Toll's request to republish his two-year-old story which had won numerous awards in the first issue on the grounds it was dated. The two were set to next meet on Sept. 22, 1980. Instead, Toll skipped the meeting, and that day published 500 copies of a 4-page newsletter called the Territorial Enterprise. The next day Toll met with Funk to show him his published paper and claim ownership of the trademark, all the while Funk had assumed Toll was still his employee.

A week later, on Sept. 29, Funk moved up his deadline and published 8,000 copies of a 4-page monthly tabloid called the Territorial Enterprise. Newton sent a cease and desist to Toll and Funk. This whole time Schaefer assumed she and Funk were still negotiating the rights and was shocked to have received his paper in the mail. On Oct. 1, she published a one-page sheet under the Territorial Enterprise masthead printed several times in different fonts. On the back she wrote a note stating she aimed to fight to keep the name.

Both Toll and Schaefer each filed their own trademark infringement lawsuits. There were four parties in the ensuing legal battle, with each claiming the legal right to the name "Territorial Enterprise." Schaefer, Newton and Toll each had been granted a trademark for the paper the Nevada Secretary of State. In court, Toll argued Schaefer's and Newton's trademark was void since neither currently published a paper under that name. But state secretary William D. Swackhamer admitted his office "goofed" when it approved Toll's application and issued him the trademark in September.

Funk never filed for the trademark rights, but in court argued a recent law change made it so that a person holding a trademark on a newspaper had to make use by publishing it, or else it expired. In October 1980, the court issued a ban on each Enterprise paper until the legal battle resolved, which Toll objected to, but the other three parties supported.

The court case dragged on for a few years. A judge quickly threw out Newton's claim due to her having never published under the name. In January 1983, a judge ruled in favor of Schaefer and against Toll and Funk. While a trademark can lapse through non-use, the judge said this must be coupled with the intent to abandon the mark, which Toll and Funk failed to show in court Schaefer having done.

==== Fourth revival (1984–-1987) ====
In May 1984, 27-year-old John Schaefer, son of Dolores Schaefer, relaunched the Territorial Enterprise as a biweekly. The first print run was 1,000 copies, with the second planned to be 10,000 copies. At that time Virginia City had a population of 700. Articles were to be written by freelancers and volunteers. The content was a mix of historical articles aimed at tourists and local news. In June 1985, the Schaefers sold the Enterprise to Thomas Muzzio, who operated a greeting card company based in Hong Kong called Aventicum Ltd.

After the sale, the paper was published by Josh Inc., a company name which comes from a pseudonym Twain wrote under. Joel Jorgensen, a former high school English/drama teacher and editor of the Hong Kong magazine Fluent English, was named Enterprise editor. Jorgensen and the other new staffers were all self-described "Twainophiles" who admitted to having no formal journalism experience. The new management split the paper into two sections, the first half, called the "Territorial Enterprise," featured Twain-like social commentary, humor and hoaxes. The back half, called the "Virginian City News," featured local news and events. Jorgensen said the goal was to eventually spin off the "Enterprise" section into a national literary magazine. Staff soon produced a souvenir edition, featuring republished stories written by Twain, which was mailed out to 20,000 "Twain enthusiasts" across the globe.

In November 1985, a second souvenir edition was published in honor of Twain's 150th birthday, which led to controversy after it featured a fictional article reporting a mining company planned to purchase and bulldoze the town to make way for an open mine pit. At this time Josh Inc. offered international tours to see Halley's Comet in Australia and New Zealand, and hired a Twain impersonator to write for the Enterprise. Jorgensen said the paper was "finally" turning a profit. However, some local business owners refused to read the paper due to the published hoaxes and wisecracks at their expense, with some readers mistaking the falsehoods as fact. They took issue with Enterprise articles calling Virginia City "a quiet and insignificant little tourist trap" and that the town had a shabby appearance with merchants who treat tourists poorly. Publisher Tom Grant, who wrote under the name “M. Jidough”, refused requests to cease publishing hoaxes. Also that November, author Dave Bass published "A Personal History of the Territorial Enterprise." The history book on the paper took 15 years to research and only 35 copies were printed, sold for $169 each.

In December 1985, a summit was held between locals and staff, and an agreement was reached to split the News off from the Enterprise and publish it as a stand-alone weekly tabloid. The Enterprise would become a glossy magazine published monthly. The first edition of the magazine was published in May 1986, and consisted of 40 pages with a press run of 25,000 copies. Grant called it a collectors item for the price of $2.50. One fictional story in the magazine, on how Hong Kong planned to lease Baja California from Mexico, caused a public scare. A year after publication, a Hong Kong news agency got a hold of the story and reached out to sources in Mexico to check its accuracy, which then led the hoax to spread among locals, forcing the Mexican government to publicly deny the story.

The News proved popular with locals, with a press run of 2,200, and slowly began turning a profit. The paper's only reporter was Gary Elam. The Enterprise magazine ceased after one issue due to costs and the News was subsequently renamed back to the Enterprise. In June 1987, the paper set up 50 vending machines in town with the goal of continuing to break even. Muzzio said "We'll always be pranksters," and declined to stop publishing humorous stories despite constant angry phone calls to his office. In July 1987, the Enterprise ceased due to poor sales and increasing demands from the greeting card business. Muzzio also citied public outrage from the previous hoaxes and opinion pieces as reasons for the closure. He received bomb treats and one of his employees was assaulted in town. While the paper closed, Muzzio retained the trademark for use in his greeting card business, which saw increasing sales, and he moved most of his operations from Virginia City to Sparks, Nevada.

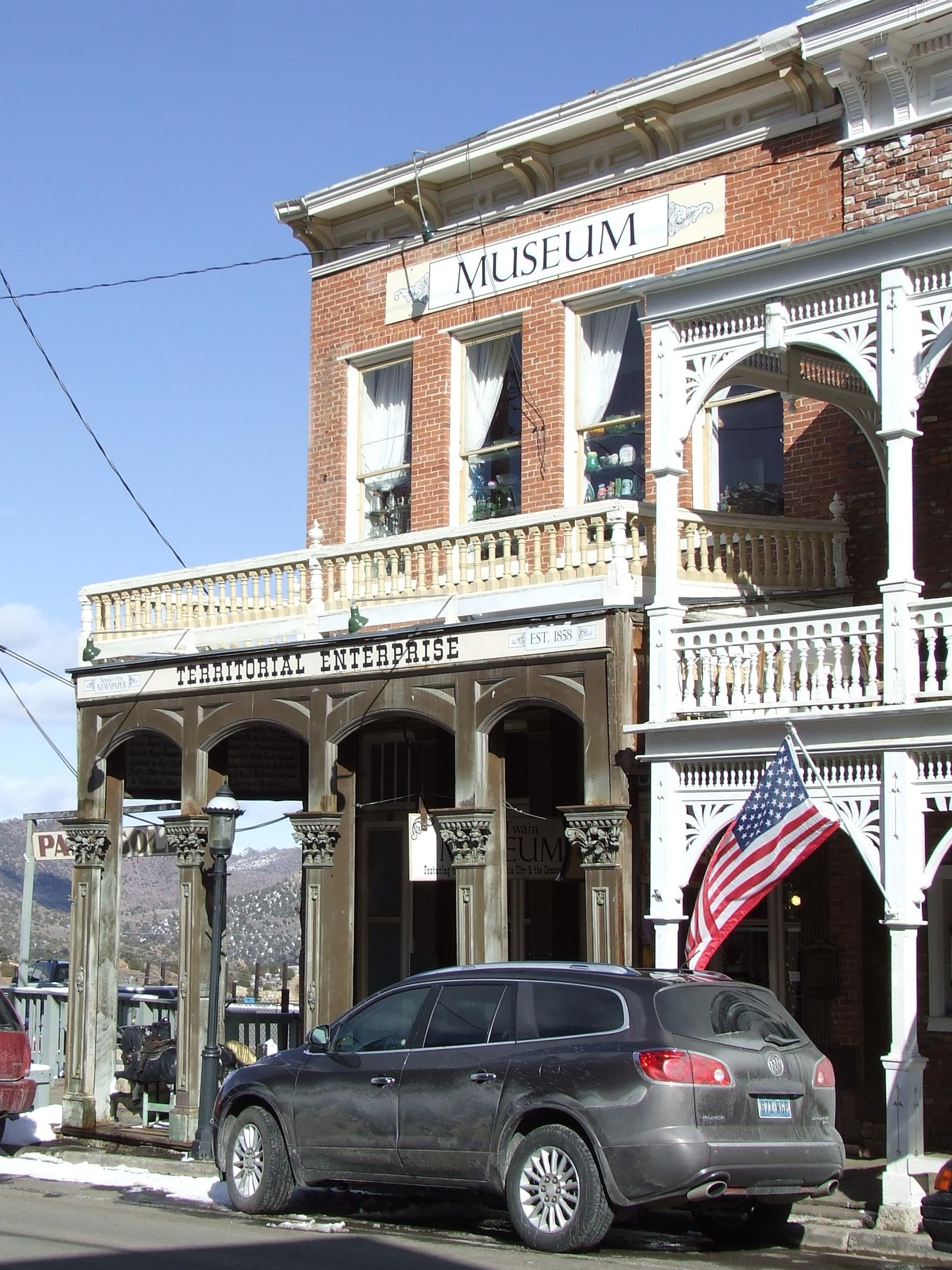
The Enterprise building in Virginia City, photographed in 2010.

==== Fifth revival (2000) ====
In January 2000, Lloyd Pendergraft and Nick Nicosia obtained the rights from Muzzio to relaunch the Territorial Enterprise as a weekly news magazine. On June 30, 2000, a prototype 28-page edition was published, with 10,000 copies hitting the streets. That was the only issue ever produced, as operations were suspended shortly after.

==== Sixth revival (2015) ====
In March 2015, Scott Faughn and Elizabeth Thompson relaunched the Territorial Enterprise as a monthly news magazine. Faughn was publisher of The Missouri Times, and Thompson was former publisher the defunct Nevada News Bureau. The magazine ceased operations after a three issues due to a trademark dispute involving Muzzio.

=== The Comstock Chronicle (1987 – present) ===
On July 31, 1987, William W. Fain and Carol A. DeKalb, owners of the Gold Hill Hotel, published the first edition of The Comstock Chronicle. The paper was intended as a more tradition weekly newspaper meant to compete with the satirical Territorial Enterprise, but after its closure, the launch was moved up by about a month to fill the news void. Enterprise editor Gary Elam was hired as Chronicle editor. In 1989, the couple announced plans to sell the Chronicle to Elam.

In 1992, Elam put the paper up for sale, asking for $39,000. At that time, circulation was 2,000 and the paper had two part-time employees. It was soon acquired by Martin Lane, a computer consultant from England. He increased circulation by 25% after a year. In 2000, Lane sold the financially struggling publication to Kristen Bachler and Betty Kaplowitz, two Bay Area artists who wanted to save the paper from closure.

The owners of the Sparks Tribune bought the Chronicle in 2003 and named Nancy Streets as publisher. In 2007, Angela Mann and her husband Richard Mann bought the paper. At that time the circulation was 1,200. In 2015, Zach Spencer and Elaine Barkdull-Spencer acquired the paper. Under their management, the Dayton Valley Dispatch was launched. The paper acts as a second edition focused on Dayton, Nevada.

In 2017, the Chronicle merged with the Virginia City News, relaunched nine years earlier by Carl and Karen Woodmansee. In March 2018, photographer Denise Crites was named Chronicle publisher, and was succeeded that October by Tiffany (Dubois) Mazza. In January 2019, Mazza officially acquired ownership from the Spencers. In January 2025, the Comstock Foundation for History and Culture, a local nonprofit, purchased the Chronicle and the Dispatch.
