= Lying Jim Townsend =

James William Emery Townsend (c. 1838 – August 10, 1900), more commonly known as Lying Jim Townsend, a newspaper publisher and saloon keeper whose tall tales about the American West were an inspiration for authors Bret Harte and Mark Twain. Scholarly authors Lawrence I. Berkove and Michael Kowalewski rate Townsend as “one of the most talented and notorious liars of the Comstock.”

== Life and career ==
Townsend was a member of the Sagebrush School of writers. He began publishing the Homer Mining Index newspaper in June 1880 at the small mining town of Lundy in Mono County, California. He later relocated 30 miles northeast to publish the Bodie Miner Index in the mining boomtown of Bodie, which he reportedly published until about a year before his death.

Berkove and Kowalewski, in an article in Updating the Literary West, recall that Townesend "participated in one of the most creative scams in Comstock history when he singlehandedly printed a regular newspaper in a deserted mining town, peopling it with imaginary citizens and reporting in detail about them and fictional mining operations, so that foreign investors could be inveigled into buying stock in nonexistent companies."

Townsend is credited by Berkove and Kowalewski an inspiration for Bret Harte's ironically-named Truthful James character in his 1870 poem "Plain Language from Truthful James." Townsend is also mentioned in Mark Twain's Roughing It.

== Death ==
Townsend died on August 10, 1900, at his brother's home in Lake Forest, Illinois, around 30 miles north of Chicago.

== Townsendisms ==
"Mill Creek is so crooked in one place that it is difficult to cross it. We waded it half a dozen times the other day and came out on the same side every time."

"The waters of Mono Lake are so buoyant that the bottom has to be bolted down, and boys paddle about on granite boulders."

"Wild onions are plentiful hereabouts, and eaters thereof smell like the back door of a puppy's nest."

"When thieves fall out honest men get their dues. But when honest men fall out, lawyers get their fees."

"The editor of the Pioche Record says 'Mrs. Page’s milk is delicious'. We shall soon hear that her husband has weaned him with a club. He knows too much."

"Mind Your P’s. Persons who patronize a paper should pay promptly, for the pecuniary prospects of the press possesses a peculiar power in pushing forward public prosperity. If the printer is paid promptly and his pocket book kept plethoric by prompt-paying patrons, he puts his pen to his paper in peace; he paints his pictures of passing events in more pleasing colors, and the perusal of his paper is a pleasure to the people. Paste this piece of proverbial philosophy where all persons can perceive it.”

“Jim Townsend went to Aurora a few days ago. In consequence the saloon keepers of that burg have ordered fresh stocks of liquors and the inhabitants have imbibed a habit of holding up their hands to their ears with a pitiful gesture whenever anybody addressed them.”

“A Fishy Feat. Jim Townsend’s readiness for any sort of an emergency is well known. The way he grappled with one the other day was a caution. Jim Slack, the “Lone Fisherman,” carried him a three-pound trout. Jim had four men at work on an arastra, and each one was clamorous for a piece. Jim counted noses and found that if he divided with all, his share would be small. His course was decided upon without a moment's hesitation. He sat down and ate the whole fish.”

Under column “Town Improvements” “The Index office will soon be graced with an L, as we need room in which to store unpaid bills.”

“Don’t steal The Index from subscribers. If you are too mean or too poor to buy it, come to the office and get a copy.”

“The Index is a derned sight better paper than some of you deserve.”

“Washington’s Birthday. The anniversary of Washington’s birthday was royally celebrated in this canyon. Patriotism cropped out exuberantly, and manifested itself so heartily that the full-blooded American bubbled over with national pride and looked on with a watery eye - frequently so watery that he couldn’t see the road. The celebration was inaugurated early in the day by a go-as-you-please procession from one saloon to another, the man who had the most money acting as Grand Marshal. By dark the crowds were ready to celebrate the birthday of anybody who would put up for whisky. Though knives and pistols were plentifully displayed, very few deaths occurred, and these only when a gun went off accidentally while the celebrants were running each other around stoves and such obstructions as a man could dodge behind. Taken as a whole, the day was one which should be forgotten as soon as possible.”
