= Subterfuge (1912 film) =

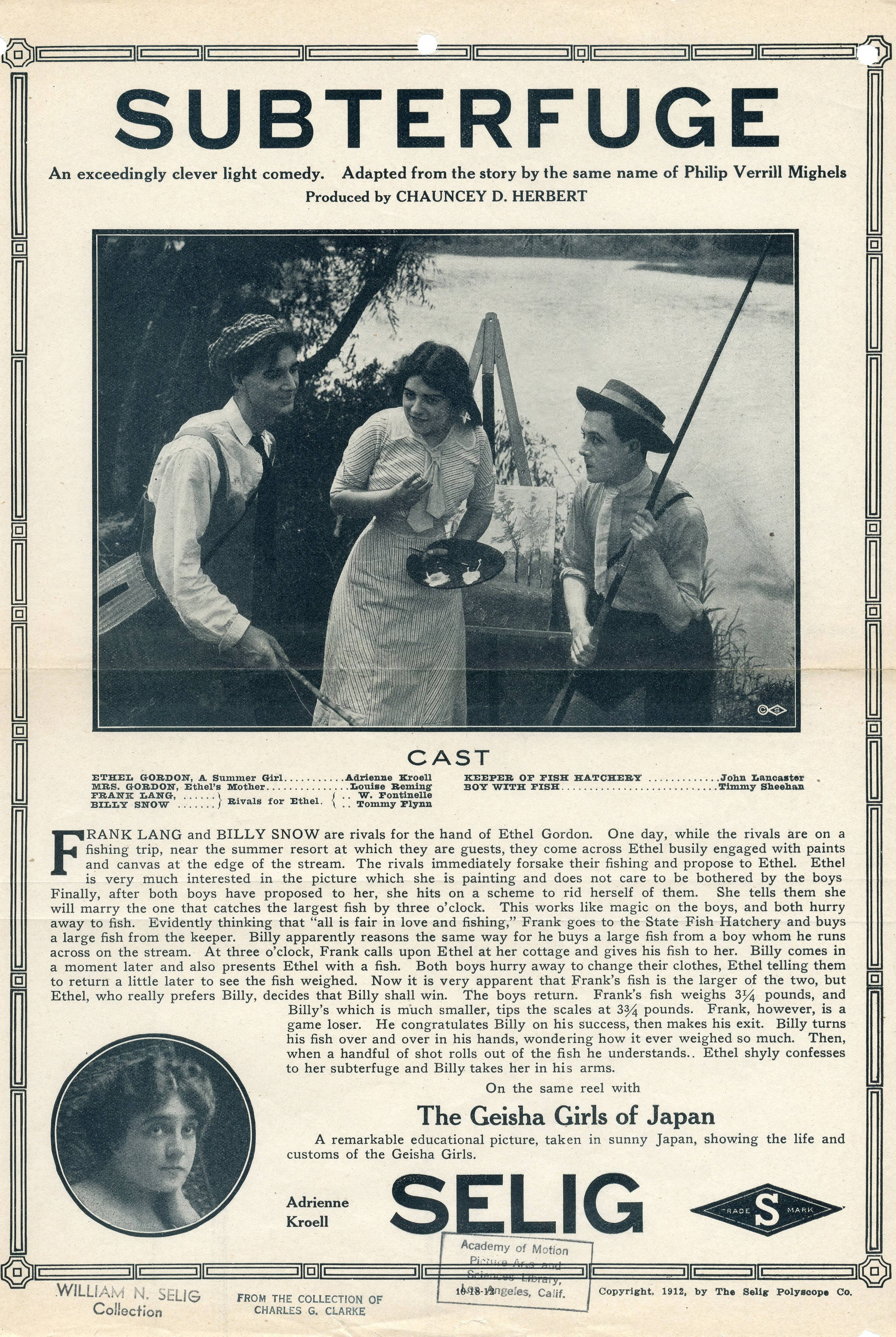
- Release flier to Subterfuge. Cast in order or appearance included W. Fontinelle as Frank Lang, Adrienne Kroell as Ethel Gordon and Tommy Flynn as Billy Snow.
- Written by: Philip Verrill Mighels
- Produced by: Chauncey D. Herbert
- Starring: Adrienne Kroell; Louise Reming
- Distributed by: Selig Polyscope Company
- Release date: October 18, 1912 (U.S.)
- Running time: 1 reel
- Country: United States
- Languages: Silent; English intertitles

Subterfuge is a 1912 American silent film drama produced by Chauncey D. Herbert and starring Adrienne Kroell and Louise Reming. It was written by Philip Verrill Mighels. The film was released together with The Geisha Girls of Japan. The film's status is uncertain but a release flier survives which is now at the Margaret Herrick Library at the Academy of Motion Pictures Arts and Sciences.

== Plot ==
Frank Lang and Billy Snow are rivals for the hand of Ethel Gordon. One day, while the rivals are on a fishing trip, near the summer resort at which they are guests, they come across Ethel busily engaged with paints and canvas at the edge of the stream. The rivals immediately forsake their fishing and propose to Ethel. Ethel is very much interested in the picture which she is painting and does not care to be bothered by the boys finally, after both boys have proposed to her, she hits on a scheme to rid herself of them. She tells them she will marry the one that catches the largest fish by three o'clock. This works like magic on the boys, and both hurry away to fish.

Evidently thinking that "all is fair to love and fishing," Frank goes to the State Fish Hatchery and buys a large fish from the keeper. Billy apparently reasons the same way for he buys a large fish from a boy whom he run across on the stream. At three, Frank calls upon Ethel at her cottage and gives his fish to her. Billy comes in a moment later and also presents Ethel with a fish. Both boys hurry away to change their clothes. Ethel telling them to return a little later to see the fish weighed. Now it is very apparent that Frank's fish is the larger of the two, but Ethel, who really prefers Billy, decides that Billy shall win. The boys return. Frank's fish weighs 3 1/4 pounds and Billy's which is much smaller tips the scales at 3 3/4 pounds. Frank, however is a game loser. He congratulates Billy on his success, then makes his exit. Billy turns his fish over and over in his hands, wondering how it ever weighed so much. Then when a handful of shot rolls out of the fish he understands. Ethel shyly confesses to her subterfuge and Billy takes her in his arms.

== Cast ==
- Adrienne Kroell as Ethel Gordon, a summer girl
- Louise Reming as Mrs. Gordon, Ethel's mother
- W. Fontinelle as Frank Lang
- Tommy Flynn as Billy Snow
- John Lancaster as keeper of fish hatchery
- Timmy Sheehan as boy with fish
