= Samuel Davies =

Samuel Davies may refer to:

- Samuel W. Davies (died 1843), mayor of Cincinnati
- Samuel Davies (clergyman) (1723–1761), Evangelist minister, president of Princeton University
- Samuel Richard Davies (1867–1907), English football player
- Samuel Davies (priest) (1879–1963), Welsh Anglican priest

== See also ==
- Sam Davies (disambiguation)
- Samuel Davis (disambiguation)
