= 'If Only' Jim =

1920 film

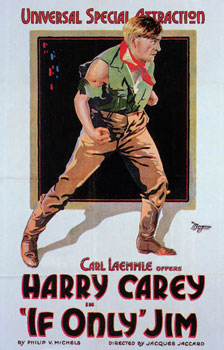
- Theatrical release poster
- Directed by: Jacques Jaccard
- Written by: George C. Hull
- Based on: Bruvver Jim's Baby by Philip Verrill Mighels
- Starring: Harry Carey
- Cinematography: Harry M. Fowler
- Distributed by: Universal Film Manufacturing Company
- Release date: 1921
- Running time: 5 reels
- Country: United States
- Languages: Silent; English intertitles

'If Only' Jim is a 1921 American silent Western film directed by Jacques Jaccard and starring Harry Carey. The film is based on Philip Verrill Mighels' 1904 novel Bruvver Jim's Baby. It is not known whether the film currently survives, and it may be a lost film.

== Plot ==
Gold miner Jim Golden (Harry Carey) revitalizes his mining efforts and finds new success after adopting an abandoned child (Thomas Smith). However, the villainous Parky (Charles Brinley) has designs both for Jim's newfound wealth, and for the local postmistress Miss Dot Dennihan (Carol Holloway) with whom Jim is enamored.

== Cast ==
Universal surrounded Carey, their veteran Western star, with a fine supporting cast including former serial queen Carol Holloway, comedy actor George Bunny, and Minnie Devereaux, a Native American supporting actress billed as "Minnie Prevost" or "Minnie Ha Ha" who had impressed Mabel Normand in their 1918 film Mickey.

- Harry Carey as Jim Golden
- Carol Holloway as Miss Dot Dennihan
- Ruth Royce as Miss Richards
- Duke R. Lee as Keno
- Roy Coulson as Henry
- Charles Brinley as Parky
- George Bunny as Uncle Johnny
- Joseph Hazelton as Bill Bones
- Minnie Devereaux as Squaw (credited as Minnie Prevost)
- Thomas Smith as 'Kid'

== See also ==
- Harry Carey filmography
