= Angell Treaty of 1880 =

US-China treaty on immigration

Treaty Regulating Immigration from China
- Signed: November 17, 1880
- Location: Beijing, China
- Effective: July 19, 1881
- Negotiators: (China) Li Hongzao; (China) Pao Chun; (United States) James Burrill Angell; (United States) John F. Swift; (United States) William H. Trescot
- Parties: Qing dynasty; United States

Full text
- Treaty Regulating Immigration from China at Wikisource

The Angell Treaty of 1880 (Chinese: 中美續修條約), formally known as the Treaty Regulating Immigration from China, was a modification of the 1868 Burlingame Treaty between the United States and China, passed in Beijing, China, on November 17, 1880.

== Historical context ==
In 1868, the United States and China entered into the Burlingame Treaty, establishing formal friendly relations between the two countries, and granting China most favored nation status. The treaty encouraged immigration from China, and granted some privileges to citizens of either country residing in the other, but withheld the privilege of naturalization for immigrants from China. The Angell Treaty reversed key provisions of the Burlingame Treaty and allowed for restriction of Chinese immigration.

During the 1870s, there were repeated efforts in the United States Congress to limit Chinese immigration to the United States. One successful effort in this direction was the Page Act of 1875, that forbade the migration of women believed to be inclined to engaging in prostitution and anybody coming to the United States as a forced laborer. The Act did not significantly curtail the flow of mostly male free Chinese laborers. By forcing women to submit to invasive bodily examinations to establish that they were not sex workers, the Page Act effectively prohibited immigration by Chinese women.

=== Fifteen Passenger Bill ===
The first bill to significantly curtail Chinese migration that passed both houses of Congress was the Fifteen Passenger Bill of 1879. The bill forbade sea vessels from bringing in more than fifteen Chinese passengers in any single voyage to the United States. Ship masters were required to present a sworn list of all Chinese passengers upon arrival, and violators could be fined $100 and six months in prison. However, U.S. President Rutherford B. Hayes vetoed the bill because it violated the terms of the Burlingame Treaty. Expressing sympathy with the aims of the bill, he suggested that the treaty be modified in agreement with China.

=== Angell commission ===
Hayes sent a commission led by James Burrill Angell to China to negotiate a new treaty to allow restrictions on Chinese immigration. John F. Swift and William H. Trescot went along with Angell also as commissioners. The party of commissioners landed in China in early August 1880. On November 17, 1880, the new treaty was signed in Beijing. According to the new treaty, the United States government would temporarily suspend immigration of skilled and unskilled laborers from China, while still allowing the immigration of white-collar professionals. The treaty also reaffirmed the United States' continuing commitment to protect the rights and privileges of Chinese laborers already present in the United States.

The prefix stated: "The United States, because of the constantly increasing immigration of Chinese labourers to the territory of the United States and the embarrassments consequent upon such immigration now desires to negotiate a modification of the existing Treaties which shall not be in direct contravention to their spirit."

The treaty was concluded along with another treaty, also negotiated by the Angell commission, that imposed restrictions on trade in opium.

=== Conclusion, ratification, and proclamation ===
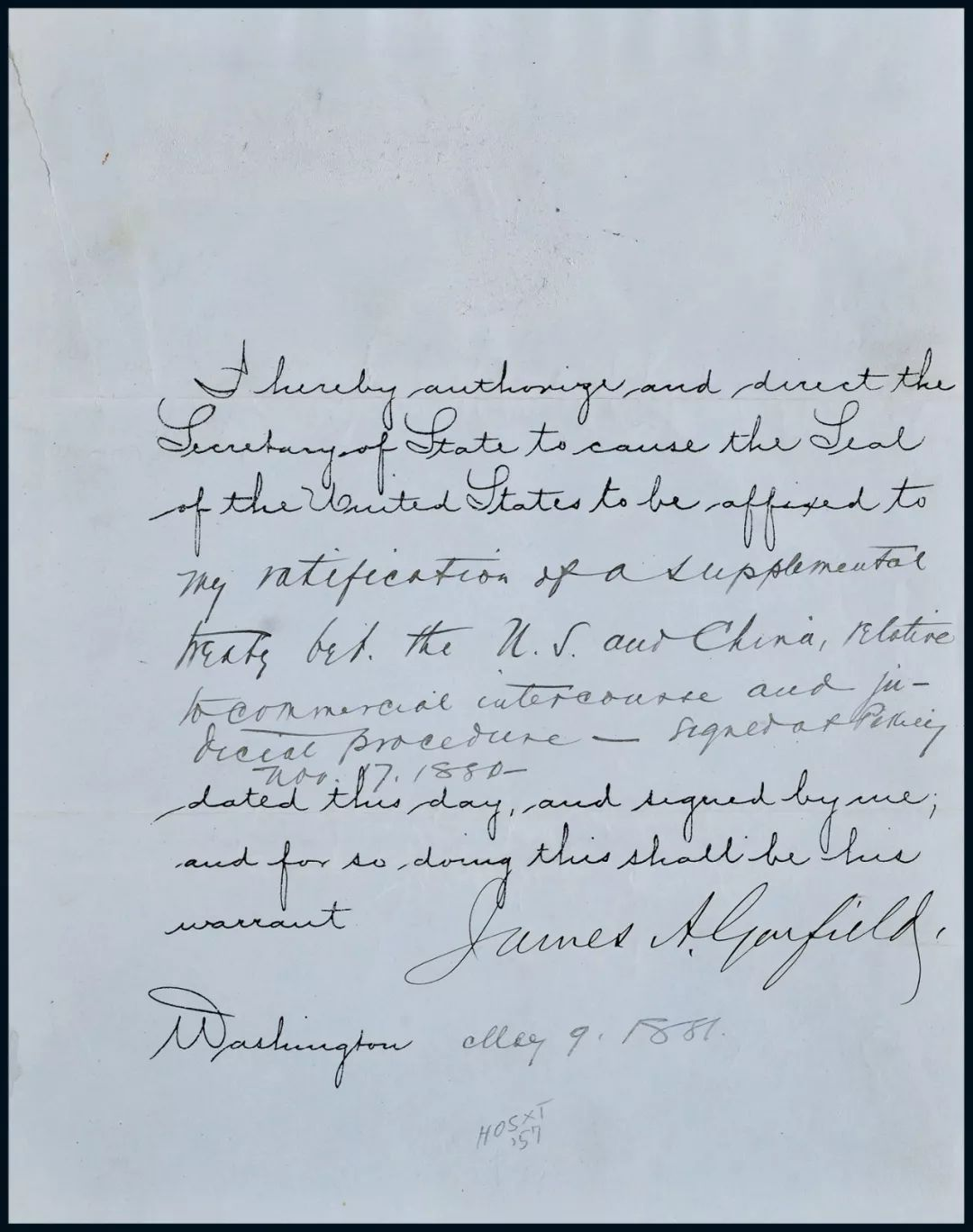
President James Garfield’s order to Secretary of State to approve the treaty

The dates for establishing the treaty were:

- Conclusion in Beijing: November 17, 1880
- Ratification advised by the United States Senate: May 5, 1881
- Ratification by the United States President: May 9, 1881
- Ratification exchange: July 19, 1881
- Proclamation: October 5, 1881

== Subsequent changes ==
The Chinese Exclusion Act of 1882 (passed May 6, 1882), passed unilaterally by the United States Congress, extended the exclusion period for Chinese laborers by another 10 years. An 1884 Amendment to the Act required Chinese laborers departing the United States to get a re-entry permit if they wished to re-enter. Later, the Scott Act would forbid the return of Chinese laborers who had departed the United States. The Geary Act of 1892 extended Chinese exclusion by another ten years, and in 1902 it would be made permanent.

Two cases that appeared before the United States Supreme Court in the 1880s referenced the Angell Treaty:

- Chew Heong v. United States (1884): Heong, who had departed the United States for China prior to the passage of the Chinese Exclusion Act, did not have the re-entry permit mandated by an 1884 Amendment to the Act. Heong would have been able to re-enter under the legal regime as it existed at the time of departure, which was shaped by the Burlingame Treaty and the Angell Treaty. When denied re-entry into the United States, he contested the decision. The Supreme Court decided in his favor.
- Chae Chan Ping v. United States (1889): Ping, who had departed the United States prior to the Scott Act, had obtained a re-entry permit as required by the Chinese Exclusion Act. However, upon his return after the passage of the Scott Act, he was denied re-entry. He contested the decision, citing the Burlingame Treaty and Angell Treaty, but the Supreme Court sided with the government.
