= Samantha Davies =

Samantha Davies may refer to:

- Samantha Davies (sailor) (born 1974), British yachtswoman
- Samantha Davies (sprinter) (born 1979), British sprinter

== See also ==
- Sam Davies (disambiguation)
- Samantha Davis (disambiguation)
