= Sammy Davis =

Sammy Davis may refer to:

- Sammy Davis (racing driver) (1887–1981), British journalist and motor racing driver
- Sammy Davis (footballer) (1900–1988), English footballer
- Sammy Davis Sr. (1900–1988), American dancer
- Sammy Davis Jr. (1925–1990), American singer
- Little Sammy Davis (1928–2018), American blues harmonica player and singer
- Sammy L. Davis (born 1946), American soldier and Medal of Honor recipient
- Sammy Davis (American football) (born 1980), American football player
- Sammy Davis (ice hockey) (born 1997), American ice hockey forward

== See also ==
- Sammi Davis (born 1964), British actress
- Samuel Davis (disambiguation)
