= Samantha Davis (disambiguation) =

Samantha Davis (1971–2024) was an English actress, known for Willow.

Samantha Davis may also refer to:

- Sammi Davis (born 1964), English actress. known for Mona Lisa

== See also ==
- Samantha Davies (disambiguation)
