= Nellie Mighels Davis =

American journalist, civic leader

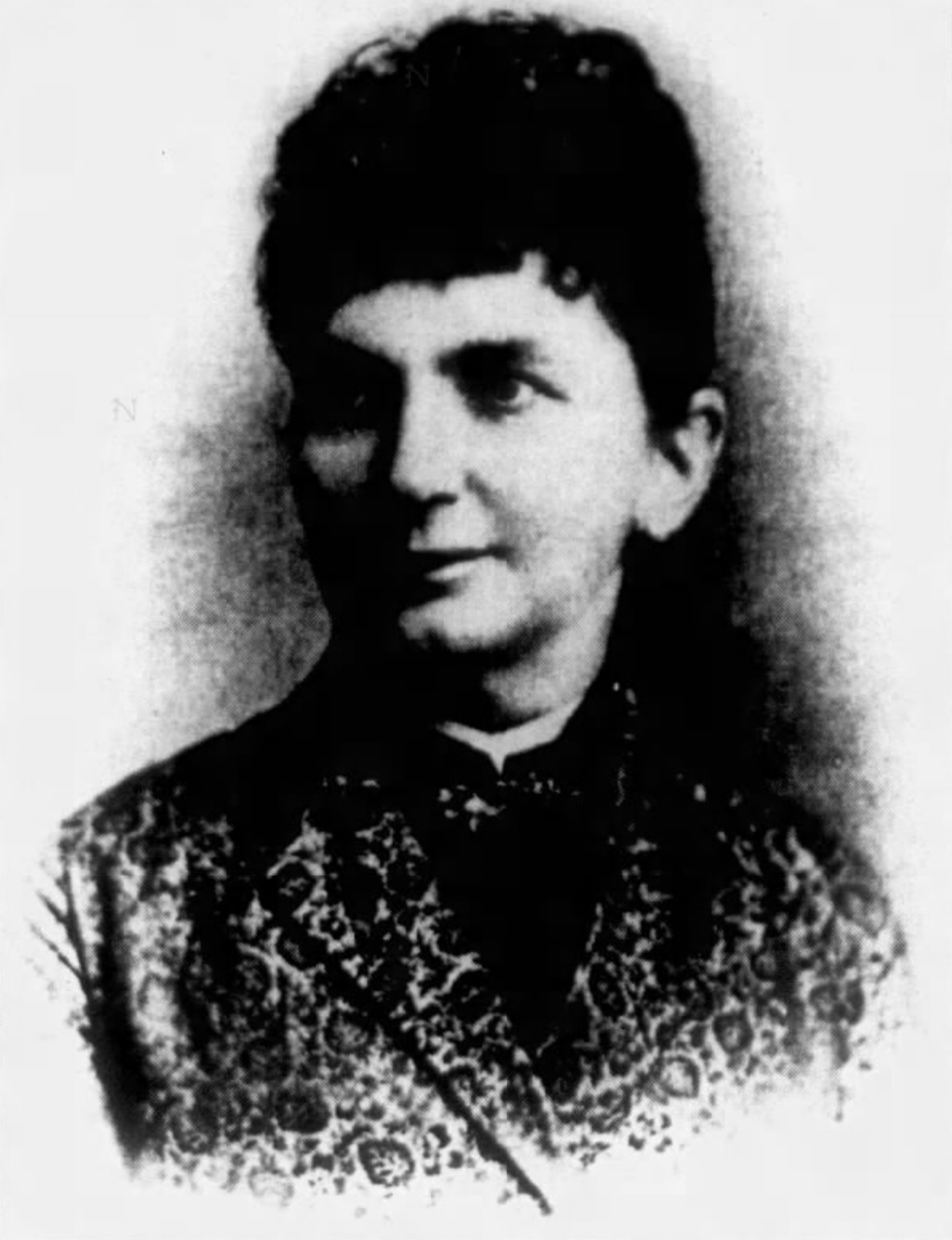
- Davis in 1870
- Born: Lucy Ellen Verrill; September 10, 1844; Greenwood, Maine, U.S.
- Died: June 24, 1945 (aged 100)
- Occupations: Civic leader and journalist

Lucy Ellen "Nellie" Mighels Davis (née Verrill; September 10, 1844 – June 24, 1945) was a US civic leader and journalist. In 1897, she was the first woman to report a boxing prize fight (Fitzsimmons/Corbett) in the United States. She was also the first state president of the American Red Cross in Nevada, and an officer of the Pacific Coast Women's Press Association. In 2020, she was inducted into the Nevada Newspaper Hall of Fame.

== Biography ==
Lucy Ellen "Nellie" Verrill was born in Greenwood, Maine, on September 10, 1844. Her siblings included Yale biologist Addison E. Verrill. In 1866, she married Henry Rust Mighels, owner and editor of the Nevada Appeal in Carson City, Nevada. They had three sons and two daughters. In 1877 and 1879, Davis was the first woman to report to the state Legislature, which is located in Carson City. Their son, Henry R. Mighels Jr., eventually took over as editor of the Appeal in 1898. Ella Sterling Mighels, former wife of their son Philip, was the "First Literary Historian of California".

Widowed at the age of 35, she hired Samuel Post Davis, of the Virginia Chronicle as her editor and she took the role of publisher. She married Davis in 1880, and he took over operations of the Nevada Appeal. They had two daughters. In 1897, she was the first woman to report a prize fight (Fitzsimmons/Corbett) as Nevada at the time was the only state in the US where prize fighting was legal. She was also the organizer and first state president of the American Red Cross in Nevada.

== Death and legacy ==
Nellis Davis died in Carson City on June 24, 1945. She was buried at Lone Mountain Cemetery in Carson City.

An 1870s oil painting of Davis is held by the Nevada State Historical Society.
