= Sam P. Davis =

American journalist (1850–1918)

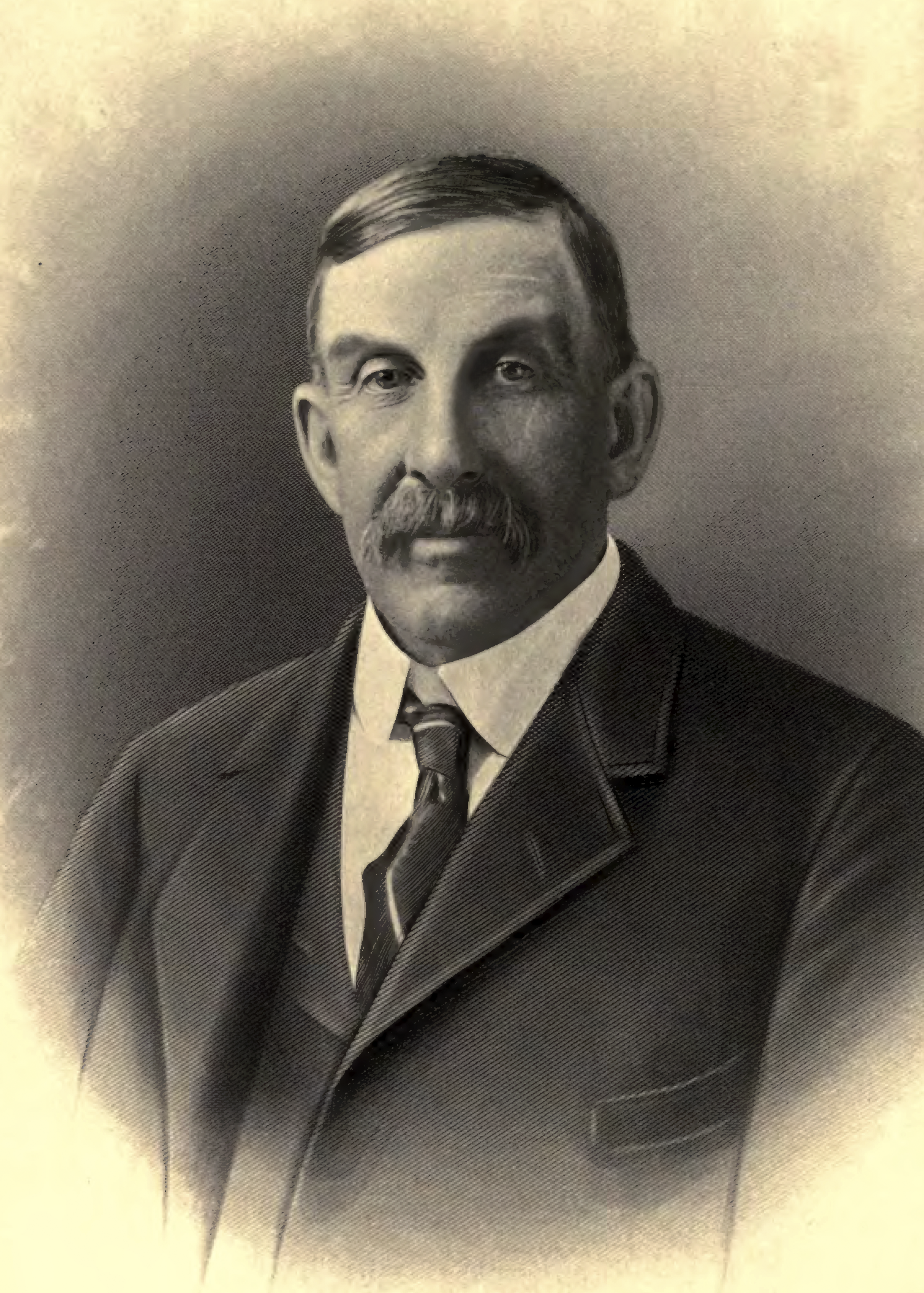
- Born: April 4, 1850; Branford, Connecticut, U.S.
- Died: March 17, 1918 (aged 67)
- Occupations: Journalist, politician, historian
- Spouse: Nellie Mighels Davis
- Children: 2

Samuel Post Davis (April 4, 1850 – March 17, 1918) was an American journalist, politician, and historian. Although primarily a journalist, Davis also wrote poetry, plays, short stories, and humorous sketches. A humorist, he was one of the writers from Nevada associated with the Sagebrush School.

He was born in Branford, Connecticut. With his Episcopalian priest father, Davis moved to New Jersey, and Wisconsin. His early journalism jobs were in Nebraska, Missouri, and Chicago. He moved to California with his father in 1872, and three years later Davis moved to Virginia City, Nevada. Davis became the editor of the Virginia Chronicle.

In 1879, after the death of Henry Rust Mighels, owner and editor of the Carson City Nevada Appeal, his widow, Nellie Verrill Mighels Davis, became the publisher, and shortly thereafter, hired Sam Davis as her editor. She married Davis the next year, and he took over operations of the Nevada Appeal.

He also had a political career. He served as Deputy Secretary of State in 1895. He was elected Nevada State Controller in 1898 and again in 1902. Five years later, he was appointed State Industrial and Publicity Commissioner.

Davis and his wife had two daughters.

== Partial works ==
- Short Stories (1886)
- The Prince of Timbuctoo (1905)
- History of Nevada (1913)
- The First Piano in Camp ... A story. With an appreciation by Sam C. Dunham. With drawings by H. Fisk, etc. (1919)
