= Henry Rust Mighels =

American journalist

- Born: November 5, 1830; Norway, Maine, U.S.
- Died: May 27, 1879 (aged 48); Carson City, Nevada, U.S.
- Resting place: Lone Mountain Cemetery
- Occupations: Journalist and politician
- Spouse: Nellie S. Verrill (m. 1866)
- Children: 5
- Writing career
- Notable work: Sage Brush Leaves
- Movement: Sagebrush School

Henry Rust Mighels (November 5, 1830 – May 27, 1879) was an American journalist and politician. A writer of the Sagebrush School, he was the editor and publisher of Carson City, Nevada's Nevada Appeal.

== Biography ==
Mighels was born in Norway, Maine, son of the naturalist Jesse Wedgwood Mighels. He served in the Union Army during the American Civil War as assistant adjutant general, with the rank of captain, and was wounded in action.

In 1868, he was elected State Printer and served a two-year term. In 1876, he was elected to the Nevada Assembly, serving as Speaker in 1877. The following year, he ran unsuccessfully for Lieutenant Governor of Nevada. He was also an artist, painting still life and landscapes. His one book, Sage Brush Leaves (1879), consists of literary essays.

== Personal life and death ==
Mighels married Nellie S. Verrill at the home of George Congdon Gorham in San Francisco on August 20, 1860. The Mighels had three sons, including Henry R. Mighels Jr. and Philip Verrill Mighels; and two daughters. Henry J. Mighels Jr. took over as editor of the Appeal in 1898. Philip's ex-wife, Ella Sterling Mighels, was the "First Literary Historian of California".

Mighels died of cancer in 1879 in Carson City and is buried at Lone Mountain Cemetery next to his wife (who subsequently married Samuel Post Davis).

== Partial works ==
- Sage Brush Leaves. San Francisco: Edward Bosqui & Co. 1879.
