= Sammy Davis (footballer) =

English footballer

Personal information
- Full name: Samuel Story Davis
- Date of birth: 25 May 1900
- Place of birth: Marsden, Tyne and Wear, England
- Date of death: 1988 (aged 87–88)
- Position: Defender

Senior career*
Years	Team	Apps	(Gls)
1922	Whitburn Colliery		
1923–1924	Stoke	2	(0)
1925–1926	Tranmere Rovers	5	(0)
1926–1927	Accrington Stanley	2	(0)
1927	Spennymoor		
- * Club domestic league appearances and goals

Samuel Story Davis (25 May 1900 – 1988) was an English footballer who played in the Football League for Accrington Stanley, Tranmere Rovers and Stoke.

== Career ==
Davis was born in Marsden, Tyne and Wear and played for his works team, Whitburn Colliery, before joining Stoke in 1923. He made two appearances for Stoke before leaving for Tranmere Rovers and then Accrington Stanley. After failing to forge a career in professional football he returned to the North East and played for Spennymoor.

== Career statistics ==
Club	Season	League			FA Cup		Total	
Club	Season	Division	Apps	Goals	Apps	Goals	Apps	Goals
Stoke	1923–24	Second Division	2	0	0	0	2	0
Tranmere Rovers	1925–26	Third Division North	5	0	0	0	5	0
Accrington Stanley	1926–27	Third Division North	2	0	0	0	2	0
Career Total			8	0	0	0	8	0
