= Ella Sterling Mighels =

American writer and historian (1853–1934)

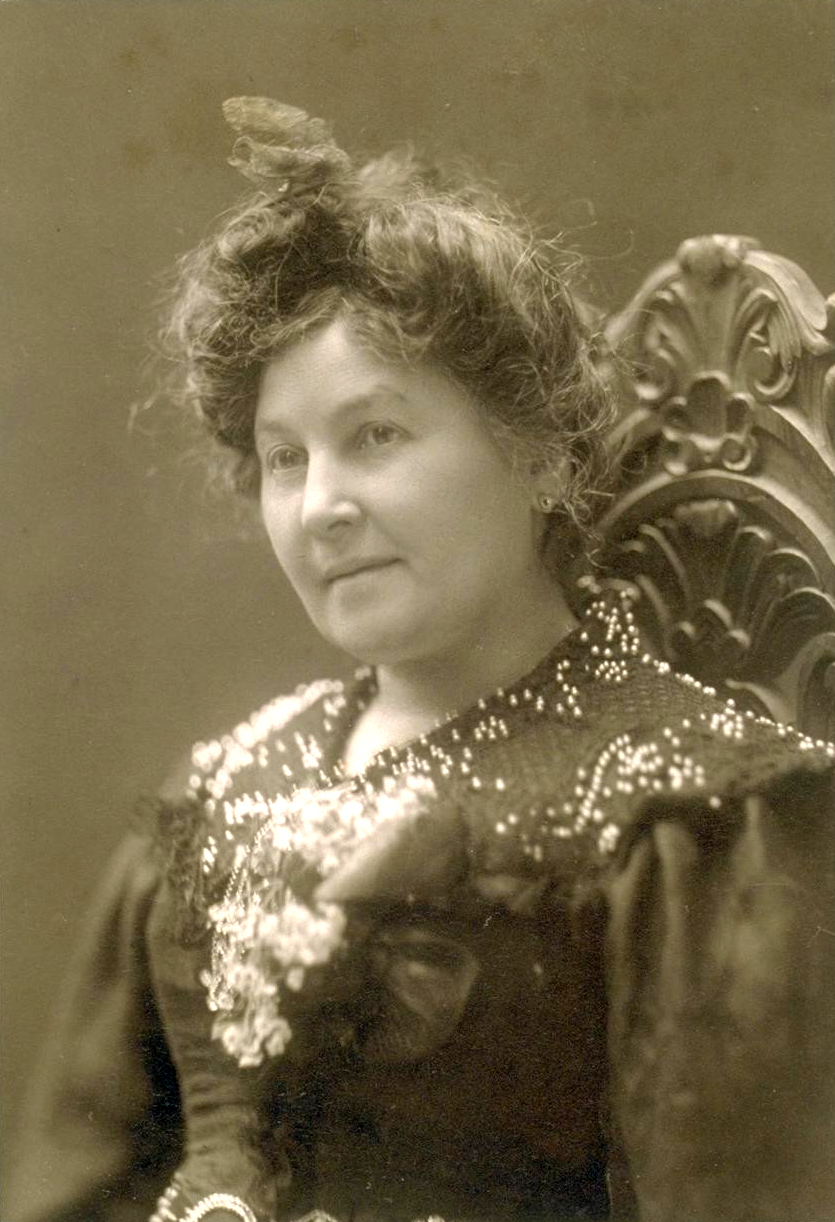
- Born: Ella Sterling Clark; May 5, 1853; Mormon Island, California, US
- Died: December 10, 1934 (aged 81); San Francisco, California, US
- Resting place: Mountain View Cemetery
- Occupations: California pioneer, author and literary historian
- Spouse(s): Adley Cummins, Philip Verrill Mighels
- Children: Genevieve
- Relatives: Henry Rust Mighels, Nellie Verrill Mighels Davis
- Writing career
- Pen name: Aurora Esmeralda
- Language: English
- Notable awards: "First Literary Historian of California"

Ella Sterling Mighels (May 5, 1853 – December 10, 1934) (née: Clark; during first marriage: Ella Sterling Cummins) was a California pioneer, author and literary historian. She was born in Mormon Island, California, but grew up in the town of Aurora, Esmeralda County, Nevada, leading her to adopt the pen name, "Aurora Esmeralda". She founded the California Literature Society (1913), and was named the "First Literary Historian of California" (1919). She died in San Francisco, and is buried in Oakland, California at the Mountain View Cemetery.

== Biography ==
Her first husband was the philologist, author, lecturer and lawyer, Adley Cummins (d. 1889); they had one child, a daughter, Genevieve (1875–1905). Her second husband was the lawyer, newspaper artist, novelist and playwright Philip Verrill Mighels (d. 1911); they divorced 1910. Her in-laws were the US journalist and politician, Henry Rust Mighels, and the US civic leader and journalist, Nellie Verrill Mighels Davis.

Mighels published two books on California literature and its authors. In The Story of the Files (1893), Ella told of California writers, in a volume published for the California World's Fair. In Literary California, poetry, Prose and Portraits (1918), Ella published selections and portraits of California authors.

== Selected publications ==
- Portrait of a California girl (n.d.)
- Books one ought to read (n.d.)
- The little mountain princess, a Sierra snowplant (1880)
- Explanation of Japanese village and its inhabitants (1886)
- The story of the files; a review of California writers and literature (1893)
- Bruvver Jim's baby (1904)
- San Francisco redi-vivus! An open letter to all San Franciscans and all Californians (1907)
- The full glory of Diantha (1909)
- Society and Babe Robinson; or, The streets of old San Francisco; a play. Containing also frontispiece ... introduction, biographical sketch and portrait of author, and a "Word to the reader (1914)
- Fairy tale of the white man : told from the gates of sunset (1915)
- Literary California, poetry, prose and portraits (1918)
- Wawona : an Indian story of the Northwest (1921)
- Book of the Ark-adian school (1928)
- Life and letters of a forty-niner's daughter by Aurora Esmeralda (Ella Sterling Mighels) ... (1929)
