= Jesse Wedgwood Mighels =

American naturalist

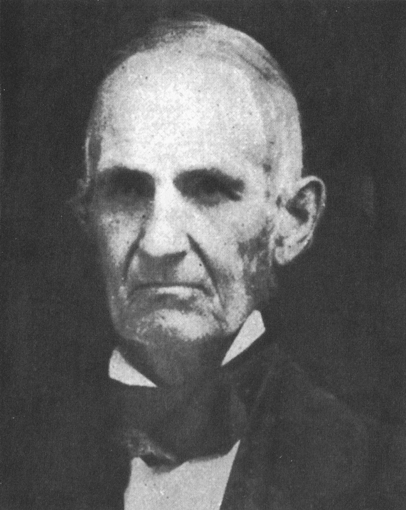
Jesse Wedgwood Mighels

Jesse Wedgwood Mighels (1795–1861) was an American naturalist and conchologist.
