= Nevada Appeal =

Weekly newspaper published in Carson City, Nevada

- Type: Twice-weekly newspaper
- Owner: Adam Trumble
- Founder(s): E.F. McElwain, J. Barrett
- News editor: Duke Ritenhouse
- Founded: May 16, 1865; 161 years ago
- Language: English
- City: Carson City, Nevada
- Country: United States
- Website: nevadaappeal.com

The Nevada Appeal is a twice-weekly newspaper published in Carson City, Nevada. It is the state's oldest newspaper.

== History ==
The Carson Daily Appeal was first published on May 16, 1865. It was founded by E.F. McElwain, J. Barrett and Marshall Robinson and edited by Henry Rust Mighels. Mighels and Robinson bought the paper in November 1865 and ran it until December 1870. After the sale, the paper was renamed to the Daily State Register. In September 1872, Mighels started the New Daily Appeal with help from John P. Jones. Robinson and Mighels joined forces a month after the November election to buy and merge the Daily State Register into the New Daily Appeal.

In 1873, Mighels dropped the "New" from the masthead and it became the Daily Appeal. In May 1877, the Daily Appeal became the Morning Appeal. Mighels became the paper's sole owner in 1878 and died a year later from stomach cancer. His wife Nellie Verill Mighels ran the Appeal until she married the paper's editor Sam P. Davis in 1880. The name was switched back to the Daily Appeal in May 1906. Davis died in 1918. Her son Henry "Hal" R. Mighels Jr. operated the paper until his death in 1932.

The paper was then owned by his widow Ida B. Mighels. In 1938, she leased the paper to Amos O. Buckner leased. In 1942, Mrs. Mighels died. The paper was then inherited her son Henry R. Mighels, Jr. In March 1944, the Mighels family sold the paper to George R. Burris, owner of the Placerville Times. Due to a manpower shortage, he sold the paper a few weeks later to Wesley L. Davis, Jr., operator of the Carson City Chronicle. In November 1946, Arthur N. Suverkrup bought the paper. The name was changed again in 1947 to the Nevada Appeal.

In 1948, Suverkrup sold the Appeal to George H. Payne, who previously published the San Jose Evening News and Marysville Appeal Democrat. Three years later the paper was sold again to a company headed by R. E. Carpenter. In 1993, the Appeal was sold by the Donrey Media Group to three of its executives. They sold it to Swift Communications in 1995.

In July 2018, the Appeal reduced its print schedule from six to two days a week: Wednesdays and Saturdays. On April 16, 2019, an edition of the Appeal was found during the opening of a time capsule from 1872 in the cornerstone of a demolished Masonic lodge in Reno. On August 1, 2019, Swift sold the Appeal and its sister publications (The Record-Courier, the Lahontan Valley News and Northern Nevada Business View) to Pacific Publishing Company. The company sold those paper in January 2025 to Eagle Valley Publishing, founded by the Appeal's editor Adam Trumble.
