= Dan DeQuille =

American author, journalist and humorist (1829–1898)

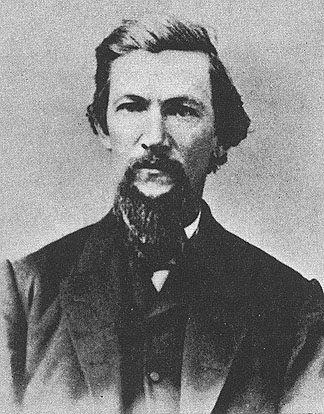
Dan DeQuille (William Wright)

William Wright (1829–1898), better known by the pen name Dan DeQuille or Dan De Quille, was an American author, journalist, and humorist. He was best known for his written accounts of the people, events, and silver mining operations on the Comstock Lode at Virginia City, Nevada, including his non-fiction book History of the Big Bonanza (American Publishing Company, 1876).

DeQuille was on the staff of the (Virginia City) Territorial Enterprise for over thirty years, and his writings were also printed in other publications throughout the country and abroad. Highly regarded for his knowledge of silver mining techniques and his ability to explain them in simple terms, he was also appreciated for his humor, similar in style to that of his associate and friend Mark Twain, and of a type very popular in the United States at that time, now referred to as the Sagebrush School literary genre.

== Early life ==
William Wright was born in Knox County, Ohio, in 1829, the oldest of nine children. In 1849 he moved west with his family to West Liberty, Iowa, where in 1853 he married Caroline Coleman. Their union produced five children, two of whom died in infancy.

In 1857, leaving his family behind, he traveled to California in search of gold. While living as a nomadic prospector in the Sierra foothills and Mono Lake region, he heard of the discovery of silver on the other side of the Sierras and ventured to Virginia City, Nevada in 1859.

With no success at prospecting there and in need of funds to send his wife and children in Iowa, Wright applied for regular employment in Virginia City at the (Territorial) Enterprise, a newspaper that had recently relocated there from Carson City, Nevada. He was hired in 1862 and soon adopted the pen name Dan DeQuille.

== Writing career ==
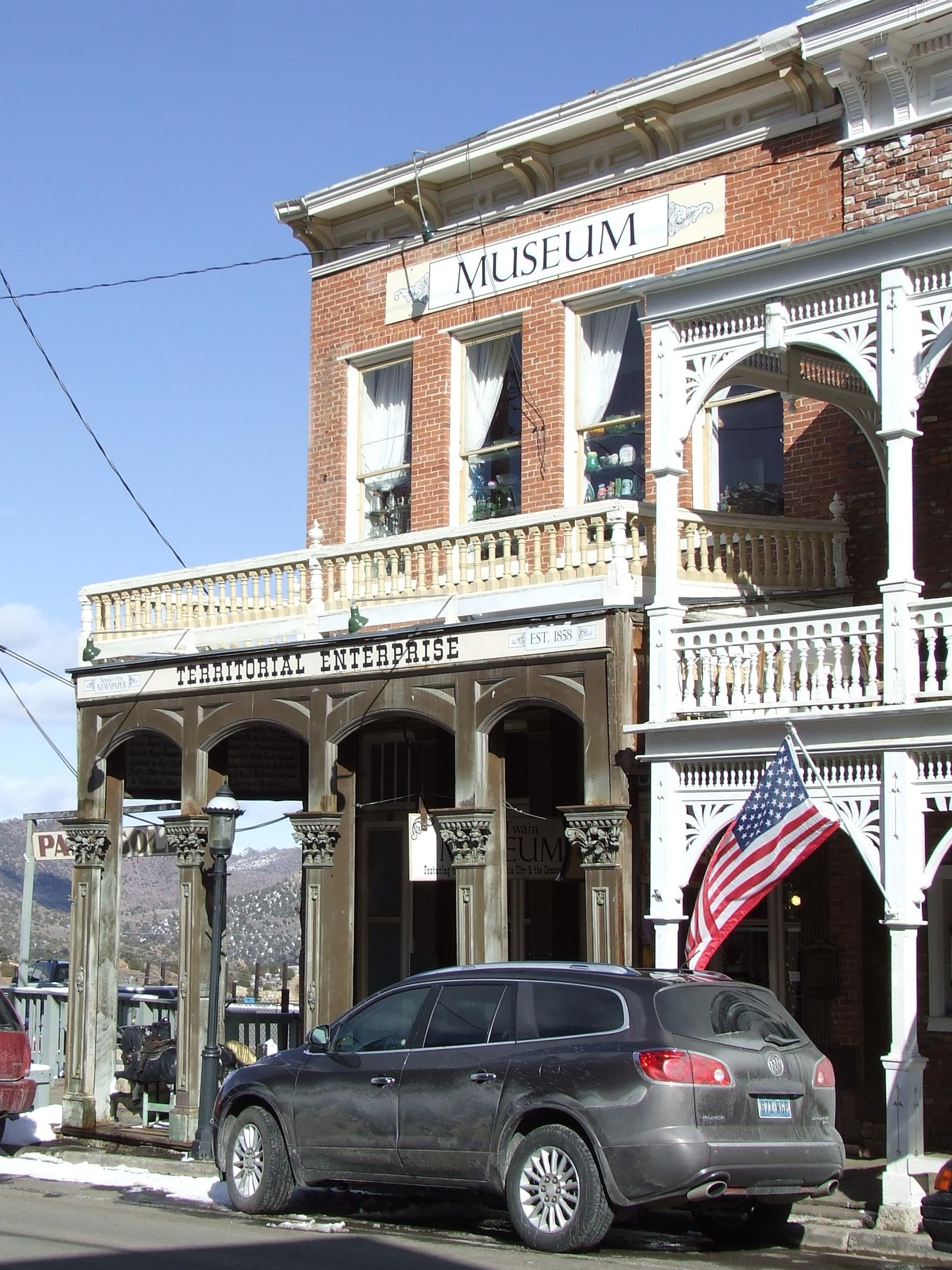
The Territorial Enterprise building (in 2010)

William Wright was interested as a young adult in a career as a writer. After his move to Iowa he wrote and submitted manuscripts to popular magazines in the East Coast. While prospecting for gold in California he wrote articles on prospector mining that were published in California newspapers. Long letters to his family helped to develop his skills at humorous exaggeration and detailed description. Following his move to Virginia City, he wrote articles that were printed in San Francisco's The Golden Era.

Soon after he became known as Dan DeQuille at the Enterprise, another unsuccessful miner named Sam Clemens was hired to work under him in August 1863. Clemens adopted the pen name Mark Twain. The two of them reported on local events and wrote columns for the newspaper. Under DeQuille's editorial supervision, Twain established his reputation as a humorous writer. Twain would later describe this period in his book Roughing It. Twain left Virginia City in May 1864 and after brief stays in San Francisco and Hawaii he toured as a lecturer, which brought him back for visits to Virginia City and DeQuille in 1866 and 1868.

=== History of the Big Bonanza ===
In 1874 mine operators John William Mackay, James Graham Fair, Sen. John P. Jones, and William Ralston decided that a book should be written about the history of the Comstock. They approached DeQuille as the preferred author and he accepted the task. His original intent was to write a small book which could be sold to overland train passengers and to continue expanding it with new information and additional sketches until it eventually became a volume which could be published for a broader audience.

DeQuille set to work on the book, collecting data, illustrations, and sketches to be included. In March 1875 he sent a letter to Mark Twain, then residing in Hartford, Connecticut, to seek his advice on having the book published. Concurrently Twain had himself seen a need for such a book and, seeing DeQuille as the one to write it, wrote him a letter to that effect. In response to DeQuille's letter, Twain responded with a 19-page letter enthusiastically providing advice and an invitation for DeQuille to gather up all the material he might need and join him in Hartford where they could each work on their respective projects in close proximity and mutual support.

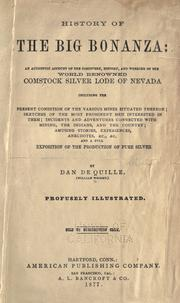
History of the Big Bonanza, title page for the 1877 edition.

Under Twain's mentorship during the summer of 1875, DeQuille pieced together a sizable volume which contained a mixture of technical chapters on silver mining interspersed with lighter accounts of Nevada events and individuals, including the Northern Paiute group of Native Americans living in the vicinity. DeQuille and Twain believed the book would have wide appeal and sell well. Twain helped DeQuille negotiate a favorable contract with his own publisher and DeQuille returned to Virginia City late that summer. In October a fire destroyed much of the city and his account of this tragedy would become the last chapter of his book.

A History of the Big Bonanza was published by the American Publishing Company of Hartford, Connecticut, in 1876. They also published A History of the Comstock Silver Lode Mines, a smaller version as a paper-bound guide-book to be sold on overland trains. The main book was eagerly anticipated in Virginia City and sold well on the Pacific Coast, but sales in the East were disappointing. DeQuille did not achieve the financial independence he had anticipated and would continue in his position at the Enterprise for another seventeen years.

=== Later work ===
At the beginning of the 1880s the major silver mining operations at the Comstock Lode were coming to an end and the population of Virginia City was rapidly declining. DeQuille remained a prolific writer, however, providing articles for publication on both coasts, contributing a portion to Myron Angel's History of Nevada (Thompson & West, 1881), and writing the article on Nevada for the 10th edition of the Encyclopædia Britannica in 1884.

In 1893 the Enterprise ended publication. DeQuille remained in Virginia City for a few more years working as a correspondent for a newspaper in Utah and as a contributor to publications on both coasts. In the late 1890s he returned in poor health to West Liberty, Iowa, where he resided with his daughter until his death on March 16, 1898.

== Legacy ==
As a journalist and author Dan DeQuille contributed significantly to Americans' understanding of the events in Nevada and the procurement of vast fortunes from the Comstock Lode in the late 19th century. As a humorist he also made a significant contribution the lore of the Wild West. During Virginia City's heyday, DeQuille was one of the most widely read journalists on the Pacific Coast because of his wit coupled with his ability to explain in non-technical terms the significance of events on the Comstock Lode.

The style of humor that flourished in the United States during the latter half of the 19th century was shared by DeQuille, Artemus Ward, Orpheus C. Kerr, Petroleum V. Nasby, Major Jack Downing, and most notably Mark Twain. It has since been theorized that America's hunger for this type of humor sprang from a sort of national psychic need from the aftermath of the American Civil War, the grief over the assassination of President Abraham Lincoln, and the hardships of industrial pioneering in the West.

Historical interest in Virginia City's past has continued throughout the 20th century. The town has become a popular tourist attraction with one of its features being the building which housed the Enterprise and on display therein the desk once used by DeQuille, Mark Twain, Bret Harte, and other frontier journalists.

In 1946 publishing house Alfred A. Knopf announced that in conjunction with the upcoming California centenary, it would reprint a series of five books that were historically significant in portraying the early days of California statehood, but which were difficult to find. The first book on their list was DeQuille's History of the Big Bonanza. Editor Oscar Lewis wrote a biography of DeQuille as the "Introduction" to The Big Bonanza, published in 1947.

In 1950 DeQuille was represented in an anthology of Western Americana entitled Comstock Bonanza, collected and edited by Duncan Emrich and published by Vanguard. More recently Richard A. Dwyer and Richard E. Lingenfelter published Dan De Quille, The Washoe Giant. A Biography and Anthology, featuring the fullest collection of his journalism and a checklist of all his writings (University of Nevada Press, 1990). English professor Lawrence I. Berkove collected the best of DeQuille's works and published them in 1990 as The Fighting Horse of the Stanislaus: Stories and Essays (University of Iowa Press).

In 1994, DeQuille was inducted into the Nevada Writers Hall of Fame.

In 2005, DeQuille's The Big Bonanza was used as the basis for a new American opera entitled The Big Bonanza, with music by Monica Houghton and libretto by Jon Christensen.

== Published works ==
- History of the Big Bonanza with an introduction by Mark Twain (Hartford, American Publishing Company, 1876), available at the Internet Archive
- The Big Bonanza with an introduction by Oscar Lewis (New York, Alfred A. Knopf, 1947)
- Snowshoe Thompson, preface by Carrol D. Hall (Los Angeles, Glen Dawson, 1954)
- Washoe Rambles, edited by Richard E. Lingenfelter (Los Angeles, Westernlore Press, 1963)
- Dan De Quille, The Washoe Giant. A Biography and Anthology, prepared by Richard A. Dwyer and Richard E. Lingenfelter (Reno & Las Vegas, University of Nevada Press, 1990)
- The Fighting Horse of the Stanislaus: Stories and essays, edited by Lawrence I. Berkove (Iowa City, University of Iowa Press, 1990)
