= Virginia City, Nevada =

- Census-designated place
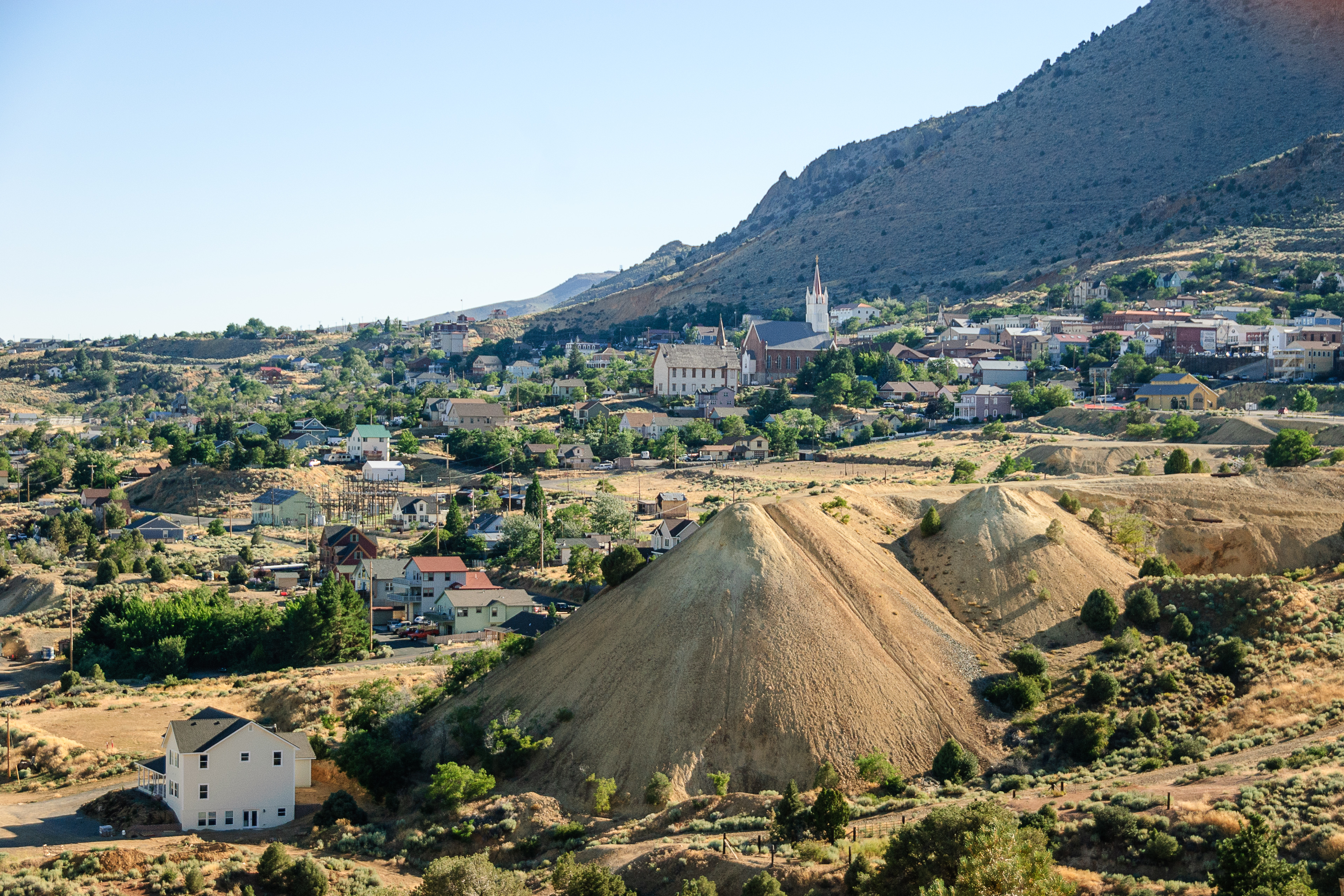
- View of Virginia City, July 2016
- Nickname: The Richest Place on Earth
- Motto: "Step Back in Time"
- Location within the State of Nevada
- Coordinates: 39°18′27″N 119°38′54″W
- Country: United States
- State: Nevada
- County: Storey

Area
  - Total: 0.86 sq mi (2.24 km^{2})
  - Land: 0.86 sq mi (2.24 km^{2})
  - Water: 0 sq mi (0.00 km^{2})
- Elevation: 6,106 ft (1,861 m)

Population (2020)
  - Total: 787
  - Density: 908/sq mi (350.6/km^{2})
- Time zone: UTC−8 (Pacific (PST))
  - Summer (DST): UTC−7 (PDT)
- ZIP Codes: 89440, 89521
- Area code: 775
- FIPS code: 32-80000
- GNIS feature ID: 2629981

Virginia City is a historic town in Storey County, Nevada, United States. It was established in 1859 after the discovery of the Comstock Lode, one of the first major silver deposits in the United States. It rapidly developed into one of the most important mining centers of the American West. At its peak in the mid-1870s, Virginia City had an estimated population of 25,000 residents and served as a center of mining, finance, engineering, and innovation.

Mining output declined after 1878, and the population fell sharply, but many historic buildings survived. The town played a significant role in Nevada’s economic development. It is closely associated with writers such as Mark Twain, who began his career there. In the 20th century, Virginia City’s historic area was preserved, and the town was designated a National Historic Landmark District in 1961. As of the 2020 census, the population was 787.

== Description ==
Virginia City is a census-designated place (CDP) that is the county seat of Storey County, Nevada, United States, and the largest community in the county. It is situated on the eastern slope of Mount Davidson, and is located on State Route 341, about 24 miles (38.6 km) southeast of Reno, Nevada. The city is a part of the Reno–Sparks Metropolitan Statistical Area.

== History ==
=== Discovery and early settlement (1859–1861) ===
Peter O'Riley and Patrick McLaughlin are credited with the discovery of the Comstock Lode in 1859. Henry T. P. Comstock later associated his name with the discovery and claimed an interest in the claim. According to local folklore, James Fennimore, ("Old Virginny" Finney) gave the town its name after breaking a bottle of whiskey at a saloon in the Gold Hill area. Virginia City had several earlier names. The settlement was initially known as Pleasant Hill or Mount Pleasant Point, and the name Virginia City was in use by October 8, 1859 as recorded in the Territorial Enterprise. Virginia City soon replaced Johntown, near the mouth of Gold Canyon, as the largest mining camp in the area.

Virginia City’s silver discoveries were distinct from the earlier California Gold Rush. At the time, silver was valued on par with gold, and the U.S. federal government purchased most of the production for coinage. The large influx of Comstock silver into global markets contributed to the demonetization of silver in 1873.

=== Comstock boom years (1860s–1870s) ===
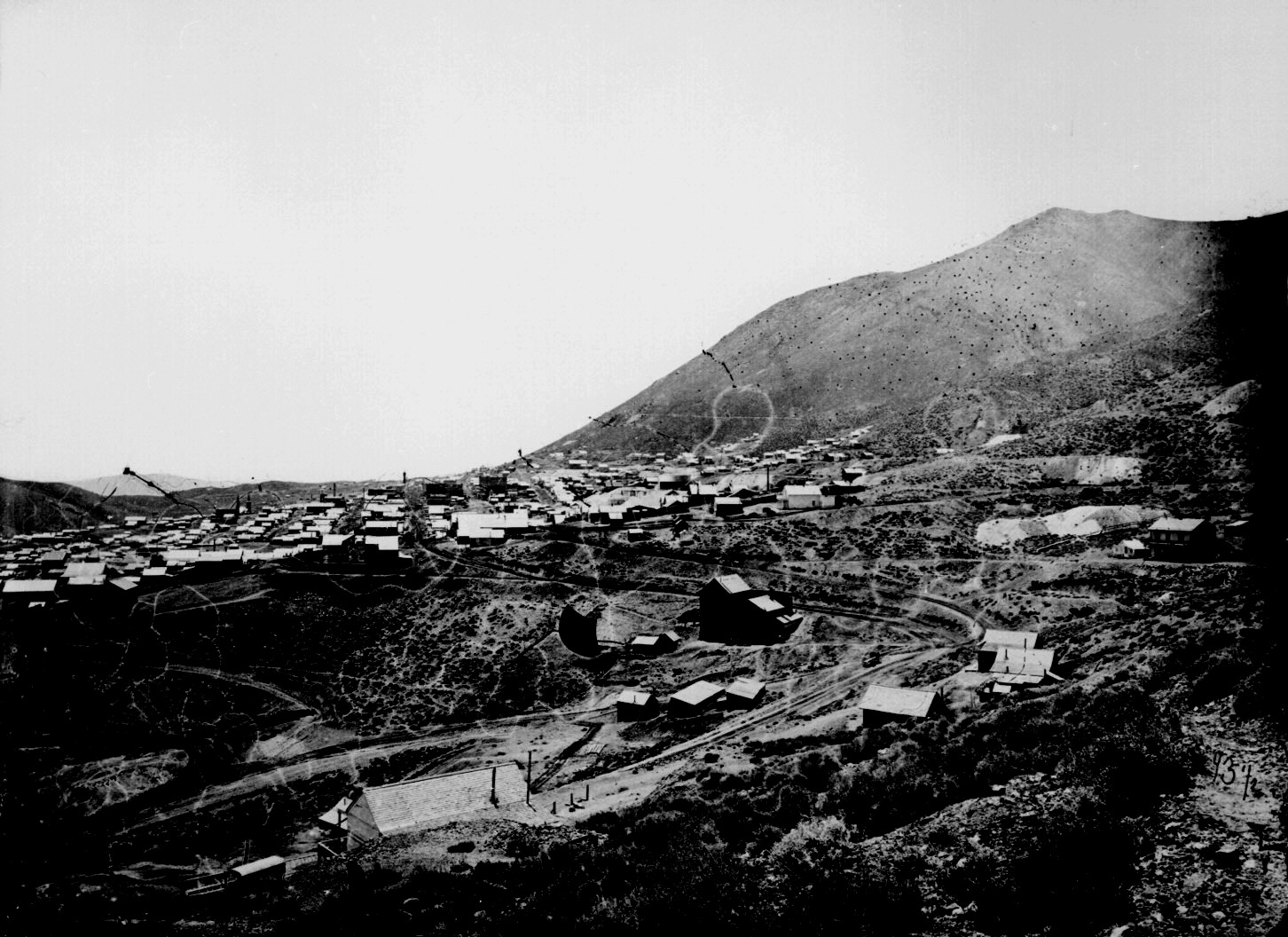
View of Virginia City, Nevada, 1867–1868

After the discovery of the Comstock Lode in 1859, Virginia City developed rapidly as prospectors and investors flooded the area. Many early settlers arrived from California following the decline of placer gold mining there. The town was incorporated in February 1861. By 1862, the population had reached 3,000, and by 1863, it had grown to more than 15,000.

Virginia City’s rapid growth was fueled not only by mining but by intense financial speculation. Over time, independent Comstock mines were gradually consolidated under large financial interests. A group known as the “Bank Crowd,” led by William Sharon in Virginia City and William Ralston in San Francisco, financed and controlled many mining and milling operations. Mining stocks were heavily traded, and speculation played a central role in Comstock finance.

By the late 1860s, control shifted to a group of Irish investors known as the “Bonanza Kings” or "Silver Kings"—John Mackay, James Fair, James Clair Flood, and William S. O’Brien–who acquired major holdings in Comstock mines, including the Consolidated Virginia Mine, where the Big Bonanza was discovered in 1873.

The Bonanza period marked the peak of Comstock production. Contemporary estimates placed total Comstock output at approximately $400 million. Mining wealth and population growth associated with the Comstock Lode contributed to Nevada’s separation from Utah Territory and its admission as a state in 1864.

Following the Big Bonanza discovery, Virginia City reached a peak population of more than 25,000 in the mid-1870s. The Comstock's most productive year was 1876, when mines yielded an estimated $36 million in gold and silver. By the mid-1870s, Comstock production centered on Virginia City had made Nevada one of the leading producers of precious metals in the United States.

==== Mining and industry ====
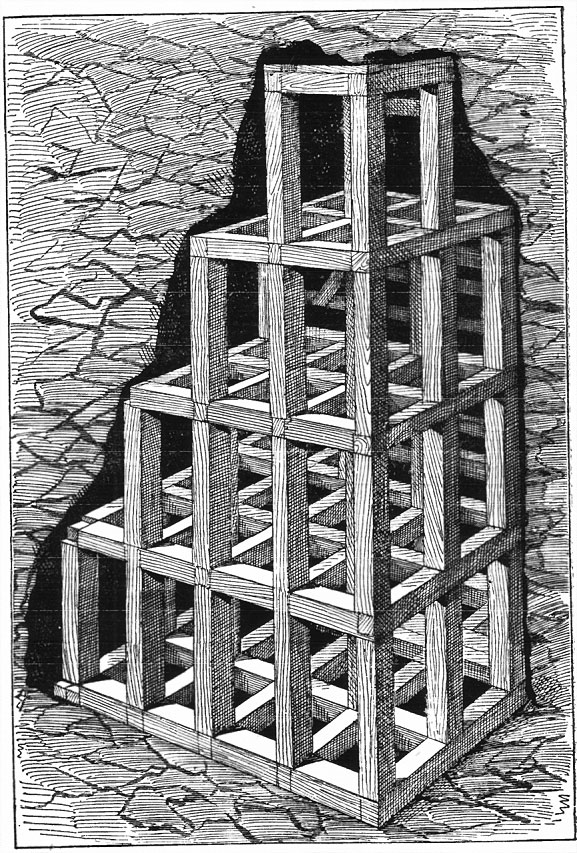
Timbering the Mines of the Comstock, sketch by Dan DeQuille, 1877.

Technical challenges in the Comstock mines led to major advances in mining technology. German engineer Philip Deidesheimer developed the square set timbering system, which allowed large underground ore bodies to be mined safely. Other innovations included improved ventilation and pumping systems, stamp mills, the Washoe process for ore milling, Burleigh machine drills, wire rope hoisting systems, and safety cages for miners.

Mining was hindered by extreme temperatures caused by natural geothermal hot springs. In winter, miners traveled through snow to reach the mines and then descended into shafts with dangerously high temperatures. These conditions contributed to high mortality rates, and earned miners the nickname of "Hot Water Plugs". To address flooding and heat, Adolph Sutro constructed the Sutro Tunnel to drain water from the mines, although many workings had already extended below its level by the time it was completed in 1879.

Between 1859 and 1875, Virginia City experienced several major fires, culminating in the Great Fire of October 26, 1875, which caused an estimated $12 million in damage and left approximately 2,000 residents homeless. Despite the destruction of many structures, key mine hoisting works survived, and the principal shafts were not seriously damaged.

In the late 1870s, much of the city was rebuilt, and many surviving buildings date to this reconstruction period. In 1876, the new six-story International Hotel was built. Piper's Opera House was rebuilt with funds donated by Tom Maquire and John Mackay. By 1880, however, the Comstock bonanza had largely ended, and mining output declined. In 1879, the population fell to fewer than 11,000.

==== Town life and institutions ====
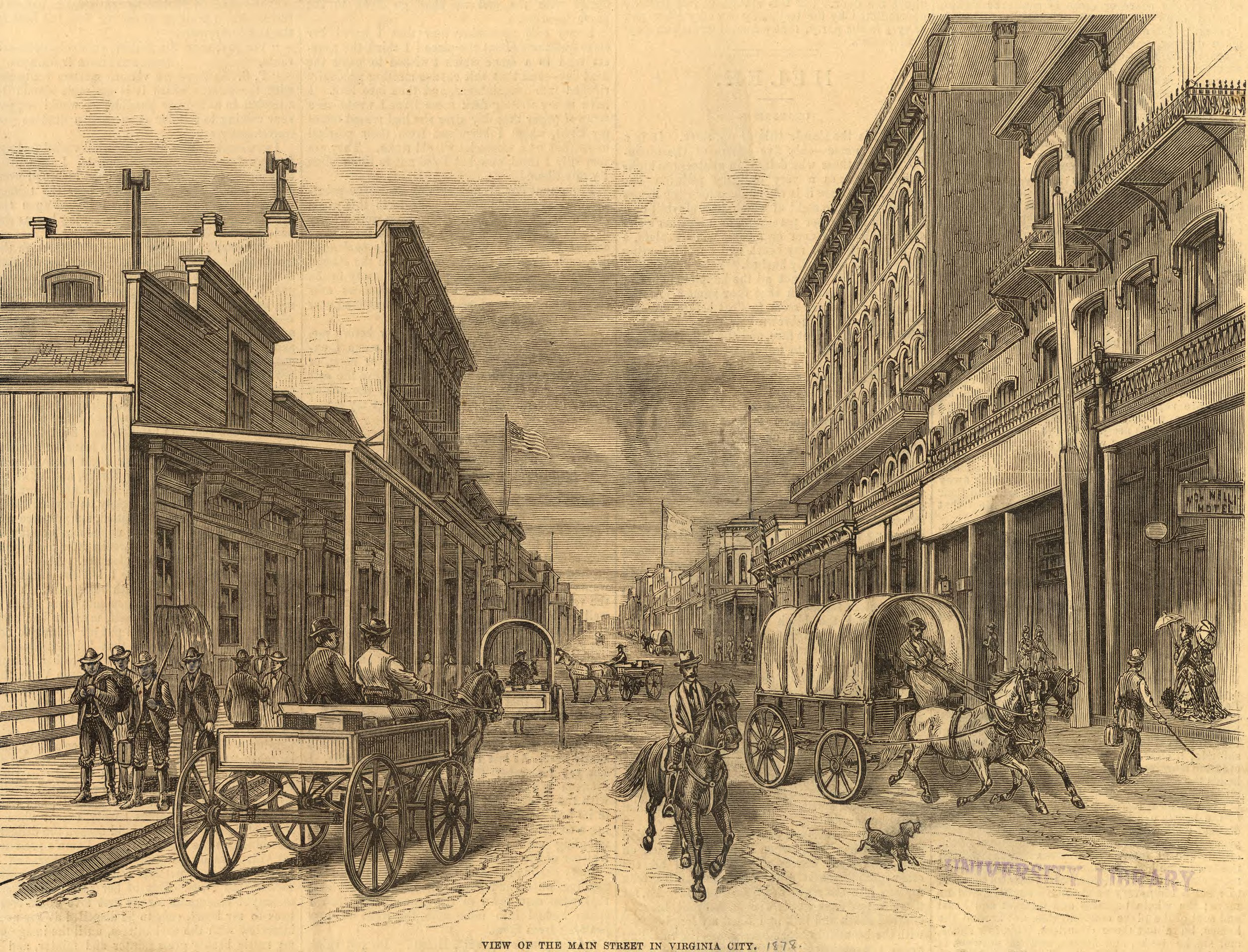
Main street in Virginia City, 1878

The economic success of Virginia City attracted new businesses and institutions to meet the needs of the growing population. Virginia City supported a range of civic and cultural institutions, including theaters, newspapers, schools, and fraternal and municipal organizations. By the 1870s, the town included an opera house, several theaters, large hotels, fire companies, fraternal organizations, five police precincts, a red-light district, multiple newspapers, four churches, and more than 100 saloons. Virginia City established the first Miner's Union in the U.S. The town was photographed by Carleton Watkins in 1875, producing some of the earliest visual records of Virginia City during its boom years.

In the 1860 census, Virginia City had only 111 women; the female population increased substaintially during the 1870s. Women worked as teachers, midwives, and nurses, and in domestic and commercial roles such as laundresses, seamstresses, cooks, and boardinghouse operators. Prostitution and brothels were also present in the town’s commercial district. Julia Bulette was a well-known sex worker in Virginia City during the 1860s and worked independently from a rented cottage.

The rapid growth in the city's population led to overcrowding in public and private schools. A large Second Empire style building, the Fourth Ward School, was completed in 1876 to meet the needs of the expanding population. Located on C Street in Virginia City, the four-story structure would accommodate more than 1,000 students. The school included modern conveniences such as indoor flush toilets, drinking fountains, individual desks, a gymnasium, and an auditorium. The school initially taught grades one through nine; in 1909, teachers and courses were added to serve grades 10–12.

With a growing population, public entertainments such as parades and circuses became popular. The first small circus arrived in town by horse and wagon in 1861. By the mid-1860s, large touring circuses visited the town, including the Lee and Rylands circus, which drew an audience of approximately 600. In 1869, three circuses performed in Virginia City including the Great World Circus, which attracted about 1,000 spectators. Dan Costello's Circus and Menagerie, among the first railroad circuses to tour the West, featured exotic animals such as lions, tigers, an elephant, monkeys and zebras, and also played to large crowds. Circuses remained a recurring attraction during the Comstock boom years.

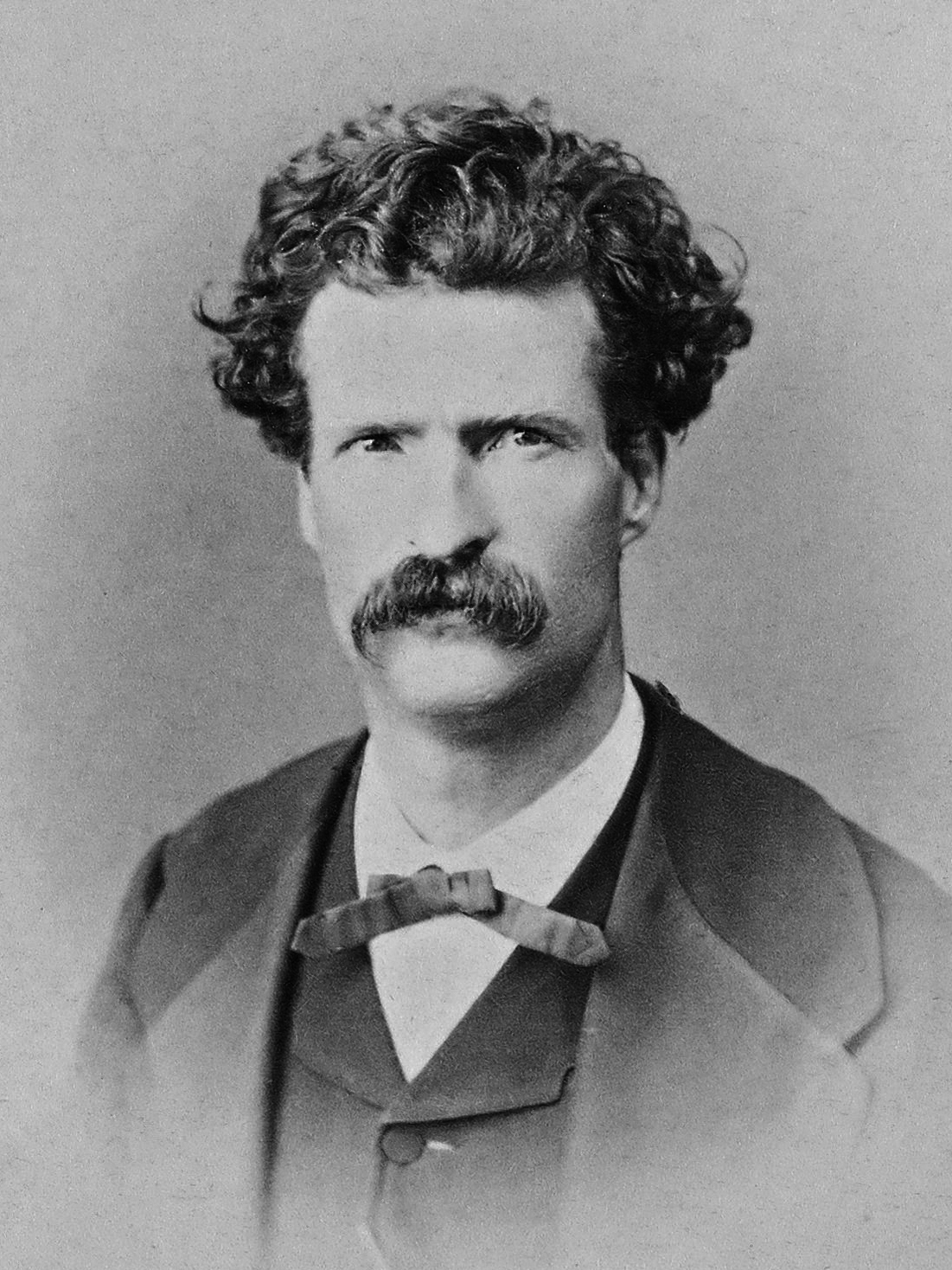
Mark Twain, 1867

==== Mark Twain in Virginia City ====
Samuel Clemens, later known by the pen name Mark Twain, worked as a reporter for the Territorial Enterprise in Virginia City from 1862 to 1864 and first used the name “Mark Twain” there in February 1863. Clemens left the city after a dispute with a rival newspaper editor but later returned to the Comstock region on lecture tours. His memoir Roughing It (1872) includes several accounts of life in Virginia City and the Comstock mining district. His time in Virginia City is often cited as formative in the development of his literary career.

=== Society and demographics ===
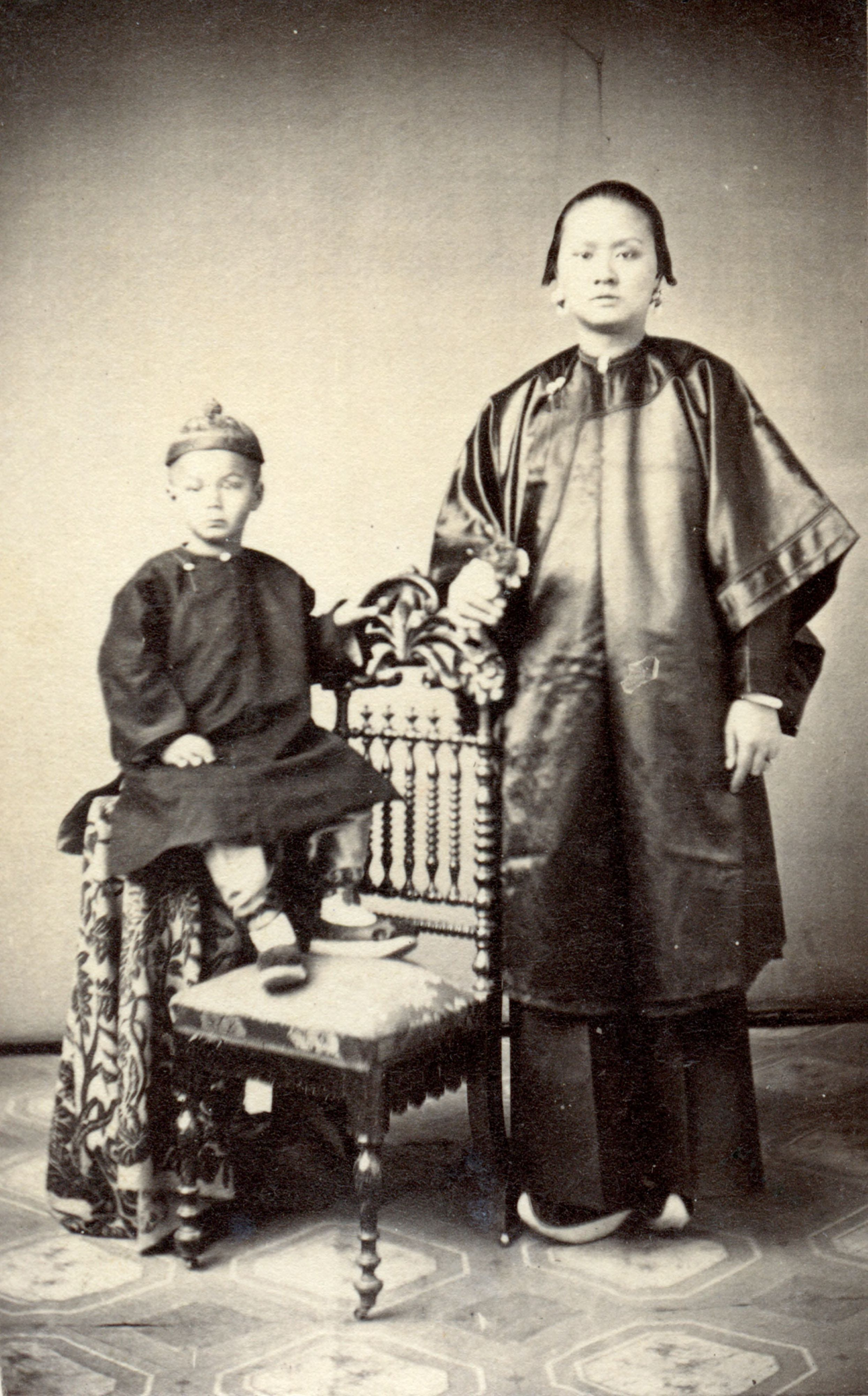
Chinese woman and child, Virginia City, 1866

Mining dominated Virginia City’s economy, making it a major industrial center in the American West. The town attracted a diverse immigrant population, particularly miners from Cornwall, England, where hard-rock mining expertise was well developed. Cornish and Irish miners formed some of the largest immigrant groups.

According to the 1870 census, Asians—primarily Chinese residents—comprised 7.6 percent of the population. Chinese immigrants worked in a wide range of occupations, including placer mining, railroad workers, restaurant owners, launderers, doctors, shop owners, and boarding house managers. During the Comstock boom, Virginia City developed one of the earliest and largest urban Chinatowns in Nevada, located east of the main business district. At its peak, Chinatown housed an estimated 1,500 to 2,000 residents.

As of the 2020 Census, the population of Virginia City was 787.

=== Decline and preservation ===
By the late 1870s, mining activity across the Comstock Lode began to decline. In 1878, rich gold-bearing ore deposits were discovered at Bodie, California, drawing miners and investment away from the Comstock. Businesses closed, and many residents left for new mining camps in California.

Virginia City entered a prolonged period of decline between 1880 and 1950. The population fell from about 10,000 in 1880 to fewer than 4,000 by 1900. By the mid-20th century, the town had become an isolated settlement of only a few hundred residents, with many 19th-century buildings abandoned or deteriorating.

Virginia City began transitioning into a tourist destination in the early 1930s after Nevada legalized gambling. Travelers and artists interested in the American West were drawn to the town, and new residents purchased inexpensive abandoned buildings.

Preservation efforts began in the 1950s, driven by historical and commercial interests. American writer and historian Lucius Beebe, moved to Virginia City in the early 1950s and began buying and restoring several buildings. In the late 1950s, the television series Bonanza helped spark a new tourism boom in Virginia City, leading to further interest in preserving the city’s 19th-century architecture.

Virginia City was designated a National Historic Landmark District in 1961 and has been carefully preserved to retain its historic character.

Historical population
| Census | Pop. | Note | %± |
|---|---|---|---|
| 1860 | 2,345 | | — |
| 1870 | 7,048 | | 200.6% |
| 1880 | 10,917 | | 54.9% |
| 1890 | 8,511 | | −22.0% |
| 1900 | 2,695 | | −68.3% |
| 1910 | 2,244 | | −16.7% |
| 1920 | 1,200 | | −46.5% |
| 1930 | 590 | | −50.8% |
| 1940 | 500 | | −15.3% |
| 1950 | 500 | | 0.0% |
| 1960 | 610 | | 22.0% |
| 1970 | 600 | | −1.6% |
| 1980 | 600 | | 0.0% |
| 1990 | 920 | | 53.3% |
| 2000 | 771 | | −16.2% |
| 2010 | 855 | | 10.9% |
| 2020 | 787 | | −8.0% |

== Climate ==
Virginia City has a hot-summer Mediterranean climate (Csa) with warm to hot summers and cooler and rainier winters.

Climate data for Virginia City, Nevada, 1991–2020 normals, extremes 1887–present
| Month | Jan | Feb | Mar | Apr | May | Jun | Jul | Aug | Sep | Oct | Nov | Dec | Year |
|---|---|---|---|---|---|---|---|---|---|---|---|---|---|
| Record high °F (°C) | 69 (21) | 70 (21) | 74 (23) | 79 (26) | 89 (32) | 95 (35) | 99 (37) | 100 (38) | 93 (34) | 85 (29) | 75 (24) | 69 (21) | 100 (38) |
| Mean maximum °F (°C) | 55.3 (12.9) | 57.1 (13.9) | 64.6 (18.1) | 71.8 (22.1) | 80.0 (26.7) | 87.3 (30.7) | 93.3 (34.1) | 91.0 (32.8) | 86.2 (30.1) | 77.6 (25.3) | 64.6 (18.1) | 56.0 (13.3) | 93.8 (34.3) |
| Mean daily maximum °F (°C) | 40.9 (4.9) | 43.1 (6.2) | 49.0 (9.4) | 54.6 (12.6) | 63.9 (17.7) | 74.3 (23.5) | 83.8 (28.8) | 82.4 (28.0) | 73.9 (23.3) | 61.3 (16.3) | 48.8 (9.3) | 40.3 (4.6) | 59.7 (15.4) |
| Daily mean °F (°C) | 33.9 (1.1) | 35.9 (2.2) | 40.9 (4.9) | 45.2 (7.3) | 53.9 (12.2) | 63.5 (17.5) | 72.6 (22.6) | 71.2 (21.8) | 63.5 (17.5) | 51.9 (11.1) | 40.8 (4.9) | 33.4 (0.8) | 50.6 (10.3) |
| Mean daily minimum °F (°C) | 27.0 (−2.8) | 28.6 (−1.9) | 32.9 (0.5) | 35.7 (2.1) | 44.0 (6.7) | 52.8 (11.6) | 61.5 (16.4) | 60.1 (15.6) | 53.1 (11.7) | 42.5 (5.8) | 32.7 (0.4) | 26.4 (−3.1) | 41.4 (5.3) |
| Mean minimum °F (°C) | 12.3 (−10.9) | 15.0 (−9.4) | 18.9 (−7.3) | 22.6 (−5.2) | 29.7 (−1.3) | 35.8 (2.1) | 50.5 (10.3) | 49.1 (9.5) | 37.8 (3.2) | 26.3 (−3.2) | 17.4 (−8.1) | 11.8 (−11.2) | 8.1 (−13.3) |
| Record low °F (°C) | −1 (−18) | −9 (−23) | 4 (−16) | 10 (−12) | 15 (−9) | 28 (−2) | 36 (2) | 31 (−1) | 21 (−6) | 11 (−12) | 6 (−14) | −11 (−24) | −11 (−24) |
| Average precipitation inches (mm) | 1.82 (46) | 2.06 (52) | 1.60 (41) | 0.54 (14) | 0.74 (19) | 0.55 (14) | 0.19 (4.8) | 0.24 (6.1) | 0.29 (7.4) | 0.65 (17) | 1.07 (27) | 1.95 (50) | 11.70 (297) |
| Average snowfall inches (cm) | 13.0 (33) | 8.7 (22) | 9.3 (24) | 2.3 (5.8) | 0.7 (1.8) | 0.2 (0.51) | 0.0 (0.0) | 0.0 (0.0) | 0.0 (0.0) | 0.3 (0.76) | 2.4 (6.1) | 9.5 (24) | 46.4 (117.97) |
| Average precipitation days (≥ 0.01 in) | 5.7 | 5.5 | 4.4 | 2.5 | 3.2 | 2.0 | 1.0 | 1.1 | 1.3 | 2.0 | 3.4 | 4.7 | 36.8 |
| Average snowy days (≥ 0.1 in) | 4.0 | 3.9 | 2.7 | 1.1 | 0.4 | 0.1 | 0.0 | 0.0 | 0.1 | 0.1 | 1.5 | 3.9 | 17.8 |
Source 1: NOAA
Source 2: National Weather Service

== Economy ==
In the 21st century, Virginia City’s economy is based largely on heritage tourism and historic preservation. The town’s National Historic Landmark District and preserved Comstock-era buildings attract large numbers of visitors, and tourism-related businesses provide much of the local employment. Some residents also work in nearby communities in the Reno–Carson City metropolitan area.

=== Transportation ===
The Virginia and Truckee Railroad extended its line to Virginia City in 1870, connecting the Comstock mining district with Carson City and the Central Pacific Railroad. Portions of the historic railroad were reconstructed beginning in 1972, and the restored line now operates heritage excursion trains between Virginia City, Gold Hill, and Carson City using historic locomotives and equipment.

== Culture and tourism ==
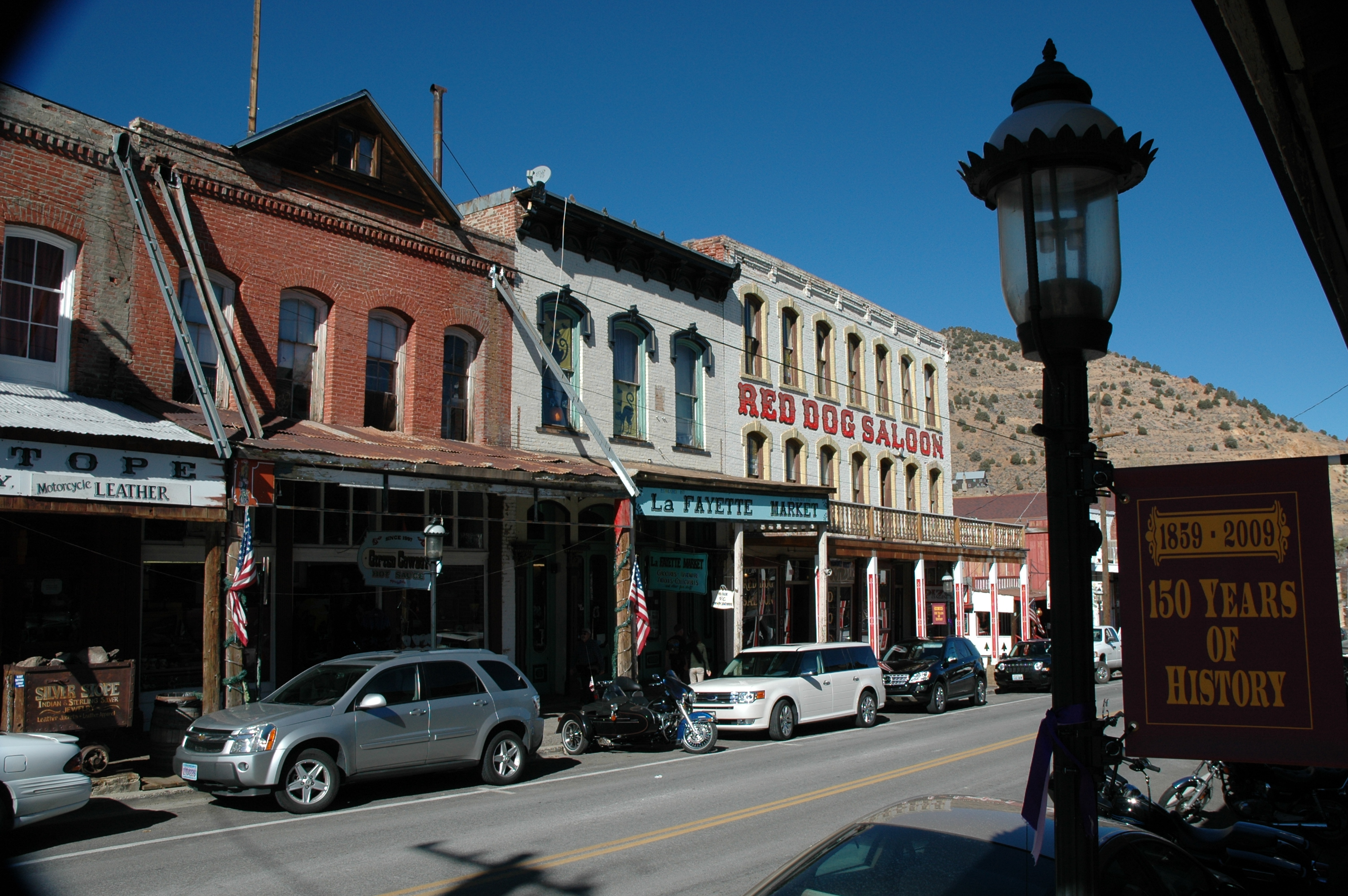
Main street view, October 2009

Virginia City is one of the best-preserved 19th-century mining towns in the United States. The town is a center of heritage tourism and historic preservation in Nevada. The town contains numerous museums and historic sites, including the Fourth Ward School, the Way It Was Museum, Piper’s Opera House, the Fireman’s Museum, and Silver Terrace Cemetery. Several annual events and festivals are held in the town, including parades and historical reenactments.

=== Virginia City Hillclimb ===
The Virginia City Hillclimb is an annual motorsport event held on Nevada State Route 341 between Silver City and Virginia City. First organized in 1964, the event attracts a variety of performance vehicles and is organized by regional automotive clubs. The course follows the historic road through Gold Canyon.

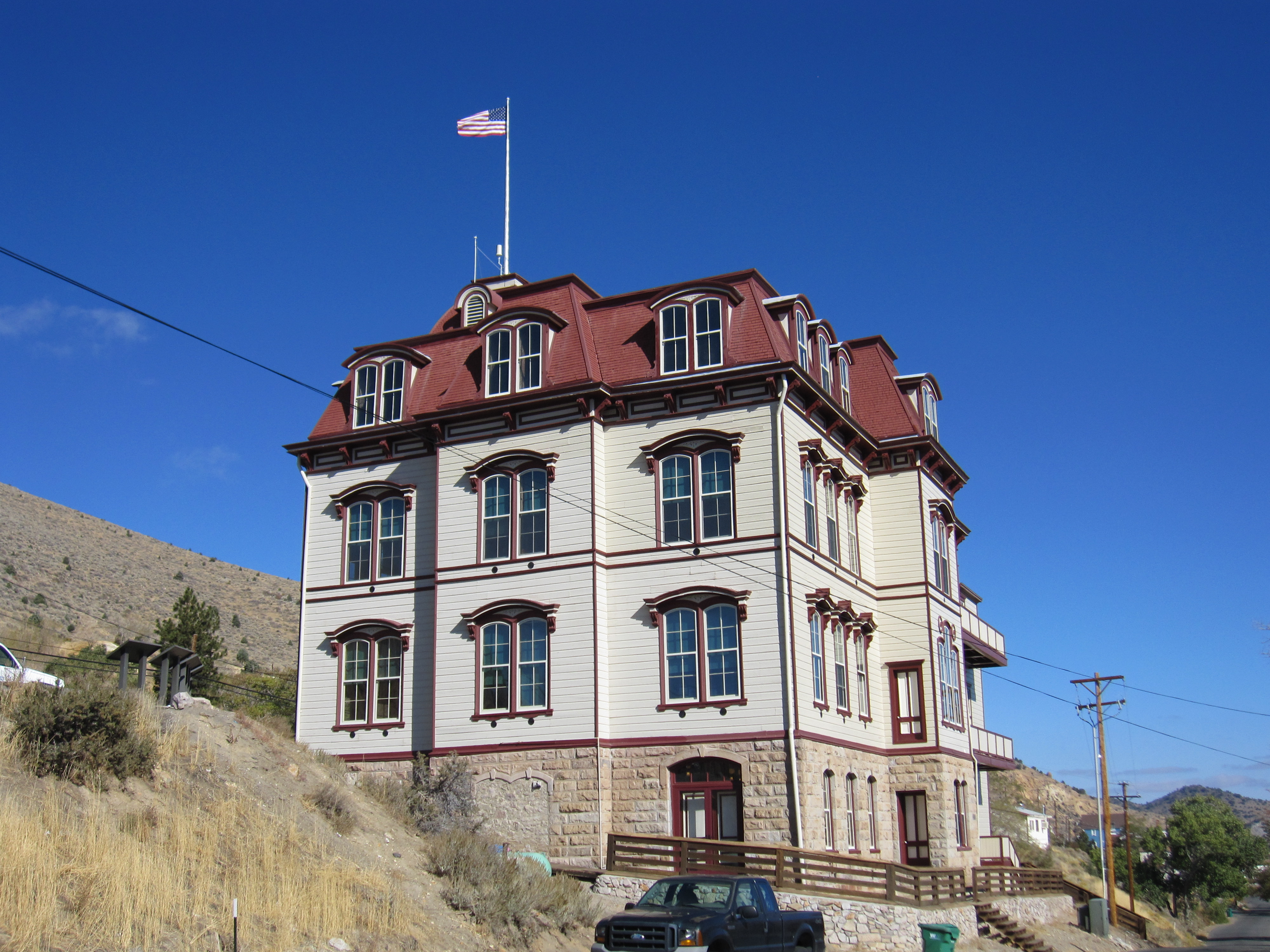
Fourth Ward School, 1876

=== Museums and other points of interest ===
Virginia City contains numerous preserved 19th-century buildings and sites associated with the Comstock Lode. Notable landmarks include the Fourth Ward School, Piper’s Opera House, St. Mary’s in the Mountains Catholic Church, St. Paul’s Episcopal Church, and Silver Terrace Cemetery. Several former mines and industrial sites, including the Chollar Mine, are preserved as historic sites.

== Notable people ==
This list includes individuals with significant and well-documented connections to Virginia City.

=== Mining and business ===
- George Hearst, an early Superintendent of the Gould and Curry in 1860.
- John William Mackay, richest mining millionaire from the Comstock Lode
- Adolph Sutro, industrialist, San Francisco mayor
- James Graham Fair, mine owner, partner to John Mackay
- W. Frank Stewart, silver mine operator and Nevada state senator from 1876 to 1880

=== Literature and Journalism ===
- Lucius Beebe, author and railroad historian
- Charles Clegg, author, photographer, and railroad historian
- Dan DeQuille, author, journalist, and humorist
- Mark Twain, worked for the local newspaper; his novel Roughing It is set in and around Virginia City

=== Science and architecture ===
- Ezra F. Kysor, architect in Virginia City from 1865 to 1868
- Albert A. Michelson, the first American to receive the Nobel Prize in Physics (1907)

=== Politics and public life ===
- Fred B. Balzar, 15th governor of Nevada from 1927 to 1934; born in Virginia City
- Marguerite Gosse Clark, first woman native to the state to serve in the Nevada Legislature; born in Virginia City
- Richard Kirman Sr., 17th governor of Nevada from 1935 to 1939; born in Virginia City
- W. H. C. Stephenson, early African American figure; advocated black suffrage

== In popular culture ==
=== Literature ===
Virginia City is the setting of Louis L’Amour’s Comstock Lode and James M. Cain’s Past All Dishonor, both set during the Comstock silver boom.

== Also see ==
- Nevada in the American Civil War

== Sources ==
- Ansari, Mary B. (1989). Mines and Mills of the Comstock Region of Western Nevada. Reno, Nevada: Camp Nevada. ISBN 978-0933504073. LCCN 89-81042. OCLC 21340434.
- David F. Myrick, ed. (1958). Reproduction of Thompson and West's History of Nevada 1881, with Illustrations and Biographical Sketches of Its Prominent Men and Pioneers. Berkeley, California: Howell-North Books. ASIN B000EDOHLG.
- Elliott, Russell R.; Rowley, William D. (1987). History of Nevada (2nd ed.). Lincoln, Nebraska: University of Nebraska Press. ISBN 978-0803267152.
- Gaw, Clifford M. (1998). "Eyewitness Account: What Happened on the Divide?". Mark Twain Journal. 36 (1): 9–12. JSTOR 41641442.
- Powers, Ron (2006). Mark Twain: A Life (Reprint ed.). New York City: Free Press. p. 167. ISBN 978-0743249010.
- Hulse, James (1981). The Nevada Adventure, a History (5th ed.). Lincoln, Nebraska: University of Nebraska Press. ISBN 978-0874170672.
- James, Ronald M. (2012). Virginia City: Secrets of a Western Past (Historical Archaeology of the American West) (Paperback ed.). Lincoln, Nebraska: Bison Books. ISBN 978-0803238480.
- Lord, Eliot (2011). Comstock Miners and Mining, 1st edition 1883 (Paperback ed.). Charleston, South Carolina: Nabu Press. ISBN 978-1175749024.
- Makley, Michael J. (2009). John Mackay: Silver King in the Gilded Age (Shepperson Series in Nevada History) (1st ed.). Lincoln, Nebraska: University of Nebraska Press. ISBN 978-0874177701.
- Mathews, Mary McNair (1880). Ten years in Nevada. Washington, DC: The Library of Congress. ASIN B003TZK4H2. Archived at The Library of Congress
- Mathews, Mary McNair (1880). Ten years in Nevada (1st ed.). Houston: Buffalo, Baker, Jones & Co. ASIN B003SHZ43A. Archived at The Library of Congress
- Powell, John J. (2012). Nevada: The Land of Silver. Charleston, SC: Nabu Press. p. 239. ISBN 978-1276532440.
- Rinella, Heidi Knapp (2007). Nevada Off the Beaten Path® (Off the Beaten Path Series) (6th ed.). Guilford, Connecticut: Globe Pequot Press. pp. 73, 78. ISBN 978-0762742042.
- Collins, Charles (2010). Mercantile Directory in 1864 (Paperback ed.). Charleston, SC: Nabu Press. p. 23. ISBN 978-1175622358.
- Snell, Charles; Larew, Marilynn (April 21, 1978). "National Register of Historic Places Inventory-Nomination: Virginia City Historic District". National Park Service. pp. 2, 8, 9.
- Smith, Grant. H. (1943). The History of the Comstock Lode, 1850–1920. Reno, Nevada: University of Nevada Press. pp. 7–16, 23–24, 28–29, 49–51, 60, 107–115, 183, 192–193, 231, 289, 295. ASIN B0014AP8GG.
- Moffatt, Riley (1996). Population History of Western U.S. Cities & Towns, 1850–1990 (1st ed.). Lanham, Maryland: Scarecrow Press. p. 159. ISBN 978-0810830332.
- Stewart, Robert; Stewart, Mary (1962). Adolph Sutro, A Biography (1st ed.). [Berkeley, California]: Howell-North Books. ASIN B0007E9EDS.
- Thomson, David (2000). In Nevada: The Land, The People, God, and Chance (Reprint ed.). New York City: Vintage Books. pp. 26, 35. ISBN 978-0679777588.
- De Quille, Dan (2013). Mark Diederichsen (ed.). History of the Big Bonanza: An Authentic Account of the Discovery, History, and Working of the World Renowned Comstock Silver Lode of Virginia City, Nevada (1st ed.). Los Angeles: Peruse Press. ISBN 978-0615922447.
- "Reports by states with statistics for counties, cities and other civil divisions: Nebraska - Wyoming, Alaska Hawaii and Porto Rico" (PDF). 1910 Census. United States census. p. 79. 1890, 1900 and 1910 population.
