= E. L. Moore =

- Born: Earl Lloyd Moore; March 14, 1898 Michigan, US
- Died: August 12, 1979 (aged 81) Spotsylvania, Virginia, US
- Occupation: Photographer, model maker, writer
- Period: 1955–1979
- Genre: Model Railroading

Earl Lloyd Moore (March 14, 1898 - August 12, 1979) was an American model railroader who published over a hundred pieces in various American model railroading magazines between 1955 and 1980 under the name E. L. Moore. His articles dealt primarily with scratch-building HO scale structures from low-cost, simple materials, primarily balsa wood. Moore prided himself on being able to construct complex models in little time for little money. He often noted that his projects could be built for a couple of dollars' worth of materials in a couple of weeks of evenings. Moore undertook this work while a resident of Charlotte, North Carolina.

Moore concentrated on depicting the buildings and life of rural America in the 1890s and early 1900s - the period around his boyhood - in accordance with his personal view on the era. Moore's articles are notable both for their subject matter as well as their style. Along with the model under discussion, Moore would write the text, shoot and develop the photographs, and draft the plans. The accompanying photographs would often include one or more detailed staged scenes depicting everyday life with the building, and the text often wove in a humorous fictional story about the building and its inhabitants. He did not concentrate on modeling particular real railroads as is the norm for model railroad hobbyists, but focused on modeling buildings of both railroad and non-railroad subjects, as well as scenery.

== Pre-model railroading biography ==
=== Early life ===
Moore was born and raised on a farm in rural southern Michigan. The farm's exact location is unknown, but in Moore's biographical piece called Early Century Field day he noted it was within a 9-mile radius of Bangor, Michigan, about 2 miles from a two-room school he attended as a boy, and there was a windmill and water tank about 2 1/2 miles away where one could board a Chicago bound 'flyer' while its locomotive stopped to take on water.

His father was the school treasurer, and on the first of each month one of Moore's chores was to deliver the teacher's paycheck. Treasurers were known to handle money, and one night Moore's father was held up at gunpoint and forced to open the safe in his parents' bedroom. The robbers made their escape by breaking open a nearby railroad section house and stealing the handcar. The next day the handcar was found abandoned down the line about a dozen miles away.

Moore served in the United States Navy on the USS Georgia in 1917 and 1918 during World War I. He was an honorary chaplain of the Veterans of Foreign Wars.

Little is known about Moore from the time he left the Navy until he arrived in Charlotte, where he set up a photography studio specializing in baby and child portraits. The few factoids that are known about Moore's life prior to his emergence on the national scene as a model railroader include: working in a paper mill in the northeast; working as a furniture salesman; and, during the 1930s, living as a self-described vagabond.

=== Photography studio ===
Moore was a photographer, and starting sometime in the late 1930s or early to mid 1940s he ran a photography studio in Charlotte that specialized in baby and child portraiture. Over the years it operated from several locations. It burned down sometime between the mid-1950s and mid-1960s. Moore then retired from business and devoted himself to model railroading.

== Model railroad publications ==
Moore's model railroading activities were intertwined with his work as a freelance contributor to various US model railroading magazines. His work appeared in Model Railroader, Railroad Model Craftsman, Model Trains and Railroad Modeler. Moore's publications can be divided into three distinct periods.

=== Period 1: February 1955 to March 1962 ===
The first period ran from February 1955, when his first publication appeared in Model Railroader, until March 1962, when his article on how to build an HO scale model of Disney's Grizzly Flats depot was the cover story of the final regular issue of Model Trains. During this time he established himself as an author capable of writing on a range of model railroading related construction projects that included structure building, rolling stock construction, scenery, lighting and scene staging.

Title	Magazine	Publication date
Trackside Photo: Elizabeth Valley RR	Model Railroader	February 1955
Elizabeth Valley RR	Railroad Model Craftsman	March 1955
Burn those models	Railroad Model Craftsman	May 1955
the Triple-P Division of the EVRR	Railroad Model Craftsman	May 1955
Spumoni Country Estate	Railroad Model Craftsman	July 1955
with the Spumoni family in Merrie Old England	Railroad Model Craftsman	January 1956
Trackside Photo: Elizabeth Valley RR	Model Railroader	April 1957
Put you figures to work	Model Railroader	July 1957
Photo in Stop, look and listen section	Model Trains	Fall 1957
Photo in Stop, look and listen section	Model Trains	December 1957
Photo in Stop, look and listen section & cover photo	Model Trains	January 1959
An old-time water tank	Model Trains	Spring 1959
The Light Fantastic - layout lighting for night and day	Model Trains	Fall 1959
Photo in Stop, look and listen section	Model Trains	December 1959
Old-Time Log Buggies	Model Trains	March 1960
Snowplow in an Evening	Model Trains	January 1961
Mountain Water Wheel Mill	Model Trains	Spring 1961
Coaling Up!	Model Trains	March 1961
Slim gauge carriage	Railroad Model Craftsman	September 1961
Open-air excursion coach	Model Trains	Fall 1961
The little red caboose	Model Trains	December 1961
Let's build a mountain	Model Trains	January 1962
Central Pacific snowplow	Model Trains	January 1962
A new look for the Old General	Model Trains	March 1962
The Station at Grizzly Flats & cover photo	Model Trains	March 1962

=== Period 2: June 1962 to October 1970 ===
The second period ran from June 1962 to October 1970. This era saw Moore develop and solidify what would become his signature style: HO scale building construction projects that could be undertaken for about $2 or $3 in materials, require a couple of weeks of spare time to complete and be suitable for a wide variety of layouts all woven into a how-to article complete with scenic photos of the finished project and a humorous fictional story. This period ended with a 13-month stretch, starting in November 1970, where he had no articles published.

Title	Magazine	Publication Date
build a Covered Railroad Bridge	Railroad Model Craftsman	June 1962
Modeling with a burning tool	Model Railroader	July 1962
Trackside Photo: Shanty	Model Railroader	July 1962
Halliday Standard Windmill	Railroad Model Craftsman	September 1962
Union Pacific Windmill	Model Railroader	September 1962
Let's build a mountain	Model Trains Yearbook	1963
3 in 1 Engine House	Railroad Model Craftsman	February 1963
Civic center for Boomtown	Model Railroader	March 1963
Octagonal Water Tower & cover photo	Railroad Model Craftsman	August 1963
Easy to build cottage or cabin	Railroad Model Craftsman	December 1963
Handcar and its shed	Model Railroader	February 1964
Branch Line Station	Railroad Model Craftsman	April 1964
A Shaggy Mountain Mill	Railroad Model Craftsman	June 1964
"Under the spreading chestnut tree"	Model Railroader	June 1964
A Hot Time At The Old Firehouse	Railroad Model Craftsman	November 1964
Trackside Photo: Moonlight on Goat Pass	Model Railroader	December 1964
Down by the Depot	Model Railroader	December 1964
Ye Olde Corner Drugstore	Railroad Model Craftsman	January 1965
Tonsorial Parlor	Railroad Model Craftsman	April 1965
Small MFG. Plant	Railroad Model Craftsman	June 1965
Major Hoople's Brick Warehouse	Railroad Model Craftsman	September 1965
Yard Blacksmith Shop	Railroad Model Craftsman	October 1965
Uncle Charlie's BOOKERY	Railroad Model Craftsman	December 1965
The old red barn	Model Railroader	January 1966
Norfolk & Southern Yard Office	Railroad Model Craftsman	February 1966
Moe Lass' Old Sorghum Mill	Railroad Model Craftsman	April 1966
Stock Auction Day	Railroad Model Craftsman	May 1966
Fertilizer Plant	Railroad Model Craftsman	July 1966
Spratt & Kean - Meat Packers	Railroad Model Craftsman	August 1966
Apple Cider Mill	Railroad Model Craftsman	September 1966
Morton's Stone Cutting Plant	Railroad Model Craftsman	November 1966
C. Reid for Feed & Seed	Railroad Model Craftsman	December 1966
Trackside Photo: Home in the Wilderness	Model Railroader	December 1966
build Ma's Place	Railroad Model Craftsman	January 1967
Turn backward, O Time	Model Railroader	January 1967
F&M Schaefer Brewery	Railroad Model Craftsman	March 1967
Brick Enginehouse	Model Railroader	March 1967
Village Grist Mill	Railroad Model Craftsman	April 1967
Six-Ton Jimmy	Model Railroader	May 1967
Cotton Waste Plant	Railroad Model Craftsman	June 1967
Grusom Casket Company	Railroad Model Craftsman	July 1967
Junk Yard Dynasty	Railroad Model Craftsman	August 1967
under the green tree - The Village Smithy Stands	Railroad Model Craftsman	September 1967
W. E. Snatchem - Undertaker	Railroad Model Craftsman	November 1967
Ramsey Journal Bldg.	Railroad Model Craftsman	December 1967
add a Harbor to your Pike, Part 1 - Tug Boats	Railroad Model Craftsman	January 1968
Interchangeable fuel for tenders; coal or wood	Model Railroader	January 1968
add a Harbor to your Pike, Part 2 - Barge, Wharf, & Sail Loft	Railroad Model Craftsman	February 1968
Hojpoj Mfg. Co.	Railroad Model Craftsman	April 1968
Victorian Firehouse	Railroad Model Craftsman	June 1968
backwoods Log Cabins	Railroad Model Craftsman	September 1968
Enskale & Hoentee - Part 1	Railroad Model Craftsman	October 1968
Crummy from HO21/2 Coal Car	Railroad Model Craftsman	October 1968
Enskale & Hoentee - Part 2	Railroad Model Craftsman	November 1968
Enskale & Hoentee - Part 3	Railroad Model Craftsman	December 1968
Molasses Mine & Factory	Railroad Model Craftsman	February 1969
Dinwoody's Button & Bead Factory	Railroad Model Craftsman	March 1969
Easy Narrow Gauge Coach	Railroad Model Craftsman	March 1969
Tuscaloosa Depot	Model Railroader	March 1969
The Centennial Celebration of the Golden Spike Laying at Promontory Point, Utah, May 10, 1968	Railroad Model Craftsman	May 1969
Putty Knife Factory	Railroad Model Craftsman	June 1969
A Garbage Train or ... the Mudville Flats Extra	Railroad Model Craftsman	July 1969
Nova Scotian Lighthouse	Railroad Model Craftsman	October 1969
Car Repair Shed	Railroad Model Craftsman	November 1969
Three Store Fronts and a Shop	Railroad Model Craftsman	December 1969
Chittenden County Mill	Railroad Model Craftsman	January 1970
Double-Bay Junction Depot	Railroad Model Craftsman	February 1970
Novelty Factory	Railroad Model Craftsman	July 1970
Wood and brick factory construction	Model Railroader	August 1970
A Brewery in Stone	Railroad Model Craftsman	October 1970

=== Period 3: December 1971 to July 1980 ===
The third period ran from his first Railroad Modeler article in December 1971 until his death in August 1979. His last article appeared in the July 1980 issue of Railroad Model Craftsman. One of his more infamous projects, The Cannonball and Safety Powder Works, which concluded by blowing up the finished model and photographing the HO scale conflagration, was published in this period and was featured in the April 1977 issue of Model Railroader. At the end of this period some of his boyhood reminisces were published in Good Old Days magazine.

Title	Magazine	Publication Date
Cousin Caleb's Cabbage Plant	Railroad Modeler	December 1971
Carolina foundry	Model Railroader	January 1972
Trackside Photo: "Bandstand"	Model Railroader	May 1972
Moore's Modern Mill	Railroad Model Craftsman	June 1972
Uncle Peabody's Machine Shop	Railroad Modeler	June 1972
Crosby's Bandstand	Railroad Model Craftsman	November 1972
The chair and desk factory	Model Railroader	December 1972
Home for Small Locos	Railroad Modeler	March 1973
Cal's Lumberyard	Model Railroader	April 1973
Bunn's feed and seed	Model Railroader	August 1973
Clarabel Hotel	Railroad Modeler	February 1974
Jones Chemical Co.	Model Railroader	March 1974
The RMC Paper Company	Railroad Model Craftsman	April 1974
Rhube's Rhubarb Plant	Railroad Model Craftsman	July 1974
A three-towered station	Model Railroader	November 1974
Mr. Pottle's potworks	Model Railroader	September 1975
A Might Relaxin' Job	NMRA Bulletin	November 1975
Uncle Sim's Snuffery	Railroad Modeler	December 1975
Waldo Hopple: Father of Railroading	Railroad Model Craftsman	July 1976
Figet's Cheese Foundry	Railroad Model Craftsman	August 1976
Ceresota flour mill	Model Railroader	November 1976
The Cannonball and Safety Powder Works	Model Railroader	April 1977
Stuckum Glue Works	Model Railroader	October 1977
E. L. Moore's Village Store	Model Railroader	January 1978
Butz Milling & Feed Co.	Model Railroader	March 1978
Bott's cotton-pickin' cotton gin	Model Railroader	September 1978
Kelley's Folly: a mill	Railroad Model Craftsman	January 1979
Ants in my pants	Good Old Days	April 1979
Early Century Field Day	Good Old Days	May 1979
The Button Works	Model Railroader	September 1979
A firecracker foundry	Railroad Model Craftsman	July 1980

=== Books ===
Samples of Moore's work appeared in books published by Kalmbach Publishing Co..

Title	Book
Photo of a night scene on the Elizabeth Valley Railroad	HO Primer: model railroading for all, Linn Westcott, Kalmbach Publishing Co., 1962, pg. 16
Photo of the lake on the Elizabeth Valley Railroad	HO Primer: model railroading for all, Linn Westcott, Kalmbach Publishing Co., 1962, pg. 41
Timber Trestles	Bridges & Buildings for model railroads, Willard V. Anderson, Kalmbach Publishing Co., 1962, pg. 23

=== Unpublished Manuscripts ===
In 1980, Model Railroader's editor, Jim Kelly, noted the magazine was in possession of 6 unpublished manuscripts by Moore and had an intention of publishing them. They were never published, but did surface in 2016.

Title	Subject	Approximate Submission Date
Village School	A 1900s one-room schoolhouse	June 1961
Crossroads Store	A "down-at-the-heels" small town general store	January 1962
The Little Church on the Hill	A 1900s village church similar to the Village School	March 1964
Build a 1900s Foundry	A model of the Cole Manufacturing Company of Charlotte, North Carolina	June 1967
A Pair of Canal Boats	Old time canal boats	March 1969
Morton Salt Conveyor	A salt loading and unloading machine	February 1971

Also in 2016 a collection of previously unknown and unpublished manuscripts were found among Moore's papers.

Title	Subject	Approximate Creation Date
Spumoni Club Coach	Passenger car belonging to the Grasse River Railroad	February 1963
Shades of Buffalo Bill	Wild West show	July 1968
Combination House Plan	Three small houses built to a single plan	November 1969
Alaska Railroad Cement Mixing Car	A cement mixing car seen in Portage, Alaska	December 1969
For the Village Square	Court house - manuscript mentioned in Moore's letters, but whereabouts unknown	July 1973
A Tale of Fox and Pop	A short story submitted to Good Old Days magazine; not known if published	October 1977
North Conway Depot	The North Conway Depot located in North Conway, New Hampshire	January 1978

=== Story characters ===
His construction articles and photo essays often wove in a humorous fictional story about the structure and its inhabitants. This set his work apart from the more usual form of construction article presentation that focused mainly on materials and how-to instructions. Moore's characters were often cast as members of his extended family; how much they were based on actual family members is unknown.

Fictional characters that have appeared in Moore's stories include: Cousin Caleb, Uncle Wilber, Mr. P. Pottle, Great grandfather Lucifer Penroddy Snooks, Waldo Hoople, Cousin Rube, Grandfather Pudzi, Uncle Peabody, Uncle Dinwoody, Cousin Elmer (Dinwoody), Pistachio Jr., Ma Spumoni, Cousin Leroy, Uncle Sim, Grandpa Bunn, and Uncle Charley Spumoni.

Moore had a large personal library and was a voracious reader. The influences of written material on Moore's projects and stories include the works of: Charles 'Chic' Sale, Rowland Emett, Dorothy Parker, Carl Fallberg, Bill Schopp, H. Allen Smith, Lucius Beebe & Charles Clegg, Charles E. Carryl, Richard Armour, George Allen and Robert B. Nixon, Jr.

Moore would sometimes appear in his stories as himself, the project's builder. In his photos of HO scale scenes he would sometimes appear in the guise of his avatar: an HO scale old time photographer hunched behind his tripod mounted view camera cloaked in a horse blanket style focusing hood.

=== Outhouses ===
Inspired by Charles 'Chic' Sale's fictional character Lem Putt, a carpenter specializing in outhouse construction, Moore built a number of HO scale outhouses of various designs that he mounted on small squares of card, signed on the bottom and gave to friends as gifts. Moore considered himself a master of outhouse modeling and eighteen of his creations were presented in his article A Mighty Relaxin' Job that appeared in the November 1975 issue of the NMRA Bulletin.

=== Television appearance ===
In early July 1971, a camera crew from the television show Carolina Camera, produced by WBTV in Charlotte, North Carolina, shot a segment on Moore and his model railroad work at his apartment. It is not known if it aired. Moore did not own a television.

== Model construction techniques ==
Eyebrows may be lifted when I state my choice of materials, so we'd better have that out right now. It's balsa.

— E. L. Moore, "Timber trestles", Bridges & Buildings for model railroads (1968), Willard V. Anderson (ed.)

Although Moore used a variety of techniques and materials to build HO scale structures, he was known for using certain construction methods again-and-again. They formed a suite of techniques for keeping his projects easy and low-cost. Moore's article, Bunn's feed and seed, that appeared in the August 1973 issue of Model Railroader, is an example project that makes use of most of his standard construction techniques.

=== Balsa wood ===
Balsa was Moore's preferred material for all aspects of construction from wall and roof substrates to the load bearing members of bridges and trestles. It was a soft and easy material to work, but also strong, lightweight, inexpensive and readily available as it was also a primary airframe building material for model airplane hobbyists.

=== Shingles & siding with a wood burning tool ===
One of his earliest articles, Burn those models, that appeared in the May 1955 issue of Railroad Model Craftsman, and Modeling with a burning tool, that appeared in the July 1962 issue of Model Railroader, outlined his technique for using a woodburning tool to score shingle, brick, stone and siding patterns into balsa instead of purchasing equivalent commercial materials.

=== Paper metal ===
If a building called for corrugated metal siding, Moore would make his own by taping a piece of 20-pound bond paper over a piece of Northeastern brand .040” spaced corrugated board and then scribing the corrugations into the paper with a spent ball point pen. To make metal roofing, he would score only along every third groove. When finished, the paper was cut into suitably sized scale panels.

=== Paper pipes ===
His buildings often needed overhead and rooftop piping, which he would make by first rounding off some balsa strips whose cross section was close to that required, and then finishing the circular profile by forcing the strips through holes of the desired diameter. He would complete the job by wrapping the now cylindrical balsa strips in paper.

=== Inked window sashes & mullions ===
Moore rarely used commercial window castings, but would make his own windows by rubbing a piece of clear acetate with an abrasive like pumice, talc or kitchen cleanser and then drawing in the mullions and sashes with a ruling pen and straightedge.

=== Selective compression ===
Many real life buildings suitable for use on a model railroad can take up an inordinate amount of space on a layout in relation to its other elements; especially so in Moore's era when many HO scale model railroads were built on standard 4' x 8' sheets of plywood. Selective Compression is a technique used to remove redundant visual and spatial elements from a building and distill it down in size to just the features that make it unique and useful on a model railroad. The resulting model is then proportioned more consistently with a layout's other elements and spacings. Many of Moore's projects were sized or selectively compressed to fit within a 1 square foot area. Moore's selective compressions were not without controversy. A letter to the editor in the August 1974 issue of Railroad Model Craftsman noted that Moore's paper mill that appeared in the April 1974 issue was rather unrealistic because it had only a 7" x 8" footprint and actual paper mills were far more massive

=== The dot & blot method of time recording ===
Moore often boasted that many of his projects only took about two weeks of spare time to build. He developed a tongue-in-cheek method of keeping track of time, outlined in his article Ceresota flour mill that appeared in the November 1976 issue of Model Railroader. On a calendar he would mark a dot for each hour worked, half a dot for a half hour, and a blot for anything thing that seemed like 3 hours. To get the time it took to build a project, he would add up the dots and blots, and add a few extras in for good measure.

== Layouts & dioramas ==
Traditionally, model railroaders are defined by their layouts. Moore built 5 layouts and dioramas. There was a 6th layout: Gordon Odegard noted that Moore's very first layout was a 4' x 6' Lionel O27 based setup, but no details are known.

=== The Rowland Emett tribute diorama ===
An HO scale diorama featuring trains, trams, buildings and scenes made famous by a number of Rowland Emett cartoons. It is thought to have been built sometime in the early to mid 1950s. Its first appearance was in the photo essay with the Spumoni family in Merrie Old England that appeared in the January 1956 issue of Railroad Model Craftsman.

=== The Elizabeth Valley Railroad ===
A 4' x 6' HO scale layout based in a mountainous region surrounding a valley with a lake and stream. Set in an unspecified US location sometime in the late 1890s or early 1900s. The layout was named for his daughter and is thought to have been built in the early to mid 1950s. Its first appearance was in a photo that appeared in the February 1955 issue of Model Railroader as part of that magazine's Trackside Photos section. The Elizabeth Valley RR was Moore's most significant layout. A number of buildings that appeared on it were described in several construction articles, and it also served as the stage for articles on lighting, scenery and rolling stock construction.

=== The Eagleroost & Koontree Railroad ===
A collection of temporary scenes built for photographing models featuring a fictitious narrow gauge mountain railroad located in an unspecified US location, situated sometime in the late 1890s or early 1900s. It was modeled in HOn2-1/2 gauge. Some of the scenes were staged on The Elizabeth Valley Railroad. Its first print appearance was in the Fall 1957 issue of Model Trains as part of that issue's Stop, look and listen photo section.

=== The 1900s Shortline Terminal Yard ===
An HO scale diorama of a backwoods, shortline terminal yard situated sometime around 1900 and was stylistically similar to the Elizabeth Valley Railroad. It was built during the winter of 1964 and 1965, and into the spring of 1965. Its print appearance was in Turn backward, O Time that was published in the January 1967 issue of Model Railroader. The yard's engine house was featured in Model Railroader's March 1967 article Brick Enginehouse.

=== The Enskale & Hoentee Railroad ===
A 30” x 30” layout situated in a mountainous region surrounding a lake. Set in an unspecified US location sometime in the late 1890s or early 1900s. It included buildings in N and TT scales, and ran trains in N and HOn2-1/2 gauge. It was built as a project layout for Railroad Model Craftsman. When Model Railroader's editorial staff learned that Moore was working in N scale, they offered him a deal to write a book for beginners starting out in N scale, similar to their book HO Primer. Moore declined the offer stating that he felt he was not skilled enough in electrical matters to write about a typical layout's complex electrical system and that he did not like working to deadlines. The layout was built during the winter of 1967 and 1968, and into the spring 1968. It appeared in print in a three part series in the October, November and December 1968 issues of Railroad Model Craftsman.

== Plastic model kits ==
Beginning in 1967, AHM (Associated Hobby Manufacturers) of Philadelphia produced the first of 9 HO scale plastic model kits, the Schaefer Brewery, based on a selection of Moore' s Railroad Model Craftsman articles.

The kit boxes were stamped with a decorative label that read: "Designed by E. L. Moore. Reproduced by permission from plans as shown in Railroad Model Craftsman Magazine." It is alleged that Moore received no payment or royalty for these kits, but was given a few as a gesture of appreciation.

AHM Kit	based on this Railroad Model Craftsman article
Schaefer Brewery	F&M Schaefer Brewery, March 1967
Ma's Place	build Ma's Place, January 1967
Grusom Casket Co.	Grusom Casket Company, July 1967
Village Blacksmith	The Village Smithy Stands, September 1967
W. E. Snatchem - Undertaker	W. E. Snatchem - Undertaker, November 1967
Ramsey Journal Building	Ramsey Journal Bldg., December 1967
Molasses Mine	Molasses Mine & Factory, February 1969
Emporium Department Store	The kit consists of 2 stores, Pool Parlor & Emporium, from Three Store Fronts and a Shop, December 1969
Busy Bee Department Store	The kit consists of 2 stores, Busy Bee & Bon Ton Dept. Store, from Three Store Fronts and a Shop, December 1969

Although the molds changed ownership over the years, some of the kits, like Ma's Place, have remained in production since their first release and remain in production as of 2017. As well, the components of some kits have been used for other commercially available plastic model kits, and in recent years, some of Moore's articles have been used as the basis of a number of commercially available craftsman-style kits.

== Death and retrospective ==
Moore died on August 12, 1979, in Spotsylvania County, Virginia, of a heart attack caused by arteriosclerosis. His remains were cremated.

In November 1979, Railroad Model Craftsman's editor Anthony Koester published a brief tribute to Moore in the Editor's Notebook column. In February 1980, Jim Kelly, editor of Model Railroader, wrote a 5-page tribute to Moore in E. L. Moore's Legacy. As well as providing a tribute to Moore's life and work, it showed for the first time a number of then never published before color photographs of several of Moore's projects. In 1999, Model Railroader noted in its Along the Line Looks Back series that E. L. Moore was a notable model railroader for his use of simple materials to build unique model structures.
