= Franktown =

Franktown may refer to:

- Franktown, Colorado, a census-designated place (CDP) in Douglas County
- Franktown, Nevada, a community that is the next stop from Virginia and Truckee Railroad Depot - Carson City
- Franktown, Virginia, an unincorporated community in Northampton County
- Franktown Cave, near Franktown, Colorado
