= Jerome Zerbe =

American photojournalist

Jerome Zerbe (July 24, 1904 – August 19, 1988) was an American photographer. He was one of the originators of a genre of photography that is now common: celebrity paparazzi. Zerbe was a pioneer in the 1930s of shooting photographs of the famous at play and on-the-town. According to the cocktail recipe book Bottoms Up (1951), he is also credited with inventing the vodka martini.

Zerbe differed from the common paparazzo in a major way: he never hid in bushes or jumped out and surprised the rich and famous he was photographing. Rather, Zerbe often traveled and vacationed with the film stars themselves. As one biographer stated, Zerbe never rode in a rented limousine, and his coat pocket always had in it an engraved invitation to the high-society events.

"Once I asked Katharine Hepburn to come up from her place at Fenwick, a few miles away, and pose for some fashion photos for me," Zerbe recalled in his book Happy Times. "She arrived with a picnic hamper full of food and wine for the two of us. I snapped her just as she came to the door."

In a career that spanned more than 50 years, Zerbe's library held well over 50,000 photos. Examples of his well-known images included Greta Garbo at lunch, Cary Grant helping columnist Hedda Hopper move into her new home, Steve Reeves shaving, Moss Hart climbing a tree, Howard Hughes having lunch at "21" with Janet Gaynor, Ginger Rogers flying first-class, plus legendary stars Charlie Chaplin, Gary Cooper, Salvador Dalí, Jean Harlow, Dorothy Parker, Gene Tunney, Thomas Wolfe, and the Vanderbilts.

Zerbe claimed to be the first and only society photographer. He was for years the official photographer of Manhattan's famed nightspot El Morocco, the place to be and be seen, whether you were Humphrey Bogart, John O'Hara, or Ed Sullivan. Zerbe pioneered the business arrangement of getting paid by the nightclub to photograph its visitors, then turning around and giving the photos away to the gossip pages. Today, the practice is a common public relations stunt.

== Early life and education ==
Zerbe was born in Euclid, Ohio, on July 24, 1904. His father, Jerome B. Zerbe, was the president of a coal company and a prominent citizen in nearby Cleveland, where the family later resided. Young Jerry Zerbe was driven to public school in the family limousine, which got him beaten up by bullies. He managed to survive well enough to be sent East, to the Salisbury School in Salisbury, Connecticut. There he took an interest in art, drawing, and photography.

Zerbe graduated from Yale in 1928, where he was an editor of the campus humor magazine The Yale Record with writer Geoffrey T. Hellman, writer and film critic Dwight Macdonald, and Hollywood art director Jack Otterson. While an undergrad, Zerbe had a knack for getting around the Prohibition laws, and was known as the guy who knew where the booze and parties were. (It helped that there was a speakeasy in the basement of The Yale Record building.) This paid off, and he became a supreme social networker. He gained important social prominence in New Haven, which would serve him well in New York City, Paris, and London.

== Early career ==
After graduation he went out to Hollywood to try his hand at drawing portraits of the famous residents. He was befriended by a young Gary Cooper, which led to Zerbe's quickly becoming friends with Hedda Hopper, Cary Grant, Errol Flynn, Randolph Scott, Marion Davies, and Paulette Goddard.

It did not take long for Zerbe to put down his paintbrush and pick up a camera. He photographed numerous stars in Hollywood's Golden Age and some of the hopefuls, before they became known, posed for him wearing few if any clothes.

== Breaking into photography ==
During the Depression, Zerbe landed his first major job, as art director of Parade, which was headquartered in his hometown, Cleveland. This was where he began his career of setting up portraits of the upper crust. He persuaded the wealthy local residents that it would help them to be photographed at their parties, which was simply not done at the time. He convinced them that it would assist the charity balls and fundraisers the leading society matrons were hosting. This paid off. He shot hundreds of debutantes, brides, newlyweds, and formal dinners in North America and Europe.

Soon afterward, Harry Bull, the editor of Town & Country in New York, saw some of Zerbe's society photos from Cleveland and made him an offer to photograph ritzy parties in the Midwest. This gave Zerbe's photos' a wide audience and garnered offers of work from the capital of glitz, Manhattan.

When Zerbe arrived in New York, he was in the right place at the right time. Prohibition had just ended, and nightlife was booming. The city had seven daily newspapers and three press associations. They all needed society photographs.

Zerbe got himself hired by the Rainbow Room, on the 65th Floor of 30 Rockefeller Center, to set up fashionable dinner parties and photograph the guests. Zerbe was shocked that at the height of the Depression, unemployed readers craved looking at photos of high-society types dressed in evening clothes and drinking champagne.

== The nightclub era ==
Around 1934, Zerbe was in business in Manhattan. He was the staff photographer for both the Rainbow Room and a bustling nightclub, El Morocco. Zerbe said that from 1933 to 1938, he spent most nights from 9 p.m. to 4 a.m. at El Morocco eating, drinking, and taking pictures.

Many considered El Morocco the classiest nightclub in town and looked down upon the Stork Club regulars as "tacky". El Morocco was the place to be seen, particularly if one just came from a Broadway show. Zerbe photos taken at El Morocco are readily identifiable due to the blue-and-white zebra-stripe fabric on all the banquettes and couches.

World War II prompted Zerbe to enlist in the Navy. He was able to bring his camera, became the official photographer for Admiral Nimitz, and found a way to travel with the stars who flew overseas to entertain the troops.

After the war, Zerbe took up photographing café society with gusto. He was a charming man who was able to rub shoulders with dukes, duchesses, visiting dignitaries, as well as John Hay Whitney, Cornelius Vanderbilt IV, and scores of others. He traveled to France to photograph estates and country homes, and also the residents.

In the 1940s, Zerbe worked for the Hearst newspaper chain, and wrote a Sunday column for the Sunday Mirror for more than 10 years. From 1949 to 1974, he was the society editor for Town & Country. He traveled around the globe photographing big celebrity events.

Zerbe had several "coffee table" photo books published. Among them were People on Parade (1934), John Perona's El Morocco Family Album (1937), The Art of Social Climbing (1965), and with Brendan Gill of The New Yorker, Zerbe's greatest collection, Happy Times (1973).

== Death ==
Zerbe died on August 19, 1988, at his Sutton Place apartment in Manhattan. He was 85.

The Zerbe photographic archive was purchased by Frederick R. Koch, eldest son of industrialist Fred C. Koch, and gifted in 2013 to the Beinecke Rare Book Library.

== Relationships ==
In the 1930s, Zerbe was the partner of the society columnist and writer Lucius Beebe. Beebe made so many flattering references to Zerbe in his newspaper column, This New York, that rival columnist Walter Winchell suggested that Beebe should change the name to "Jerome Never Looked Lovelier."

== See also ==
- Café society
- Jet set

== Bibliography ==
- Zerbe, Jerome; Beebe, Lucius (1934). People on Parade. New York: D. Kemp.
- Zerbe, Jerome; Beebe, Lucius (1937). John Perona's El Morocco Family Album. New York: privately published.
- Zerbe, Jerome; Gill, Brendan (1973). Happy Times. New York: Harcourt Brace Jovanovich.
