= El Morocco =

Former nightclub in Manhattan

- Elmo
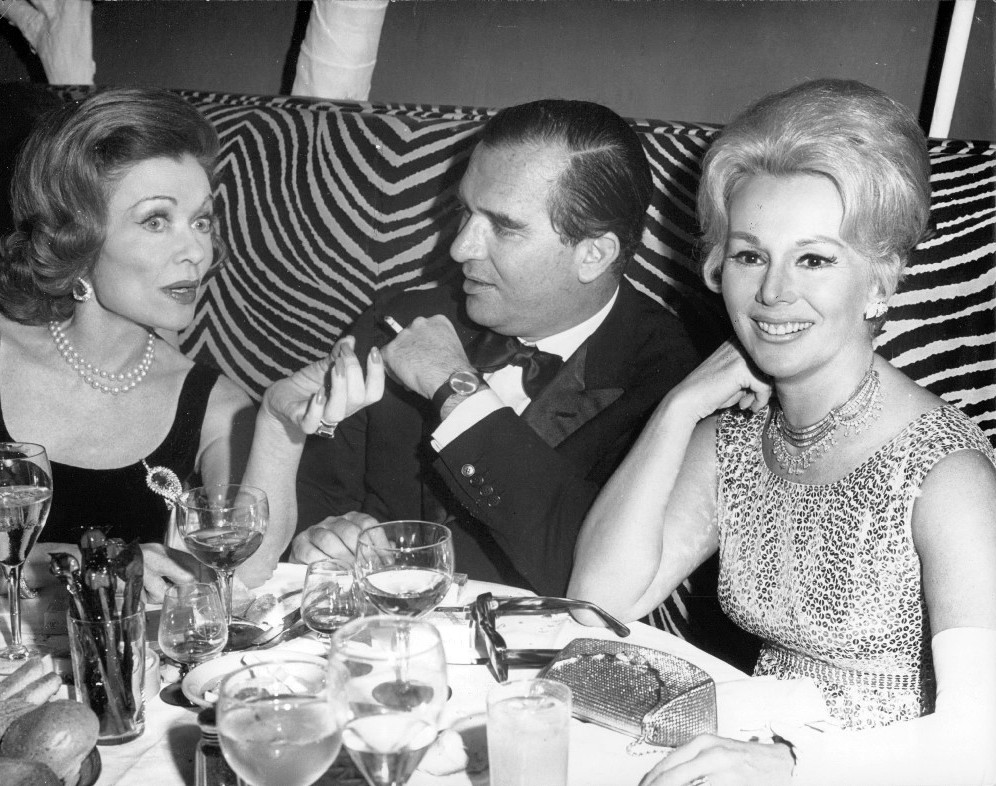
- Constance Bennett, Richard Brown, and Eva Gabor at El Morocco in 1965
- Interactive map of El Morocco
- Location: Manhattan, New York City, U.S.
- Coordinates: 40.75875°N 73.96975°W
- Type: Nightclub

Construction
- Opened: October 5, 1931
- Closed: May 23, 1970

Tenant
- Milan Condominium

El Morocco, sometimes nicknamed Elmo or Elmer, was a nightclub in the Manhattan borough of New York City. It was opened as a speakeasy at 154 East 54th Street and relocated to 307 East 54th Street in its later days. El Morrocco was frequented by the rich and famous from the 1930s until the decline of café society in the late 1950s. It was known for its blue zebra-stripe motif, designed by Vernon MacFarlane, and its official photographer, Jerome Zerbe.

== History ==
On October 5, 1931, John Perona (born Enrione Giovanni Perona in Chiaverano in the Province of Turin, Italy), an Italian immigrant, with Martín de Alzaga opened El Morocco as a speakeasy at 154 East 54th Street, in Midtown Manhattan, New York City. After prohibition was repealed, it became one of the most popular establishments in New York City.

Originally known as The Morocco, the nightclub was soon renamed El Morocco because of its proximity to the Third Avenue elevated railway ("El"). Its iconic zebra-striped interior was designed by Vernon Balfour McFarlane, an Australian actor turned interior decorator. McFarlane initially proposed the name Sahara, envisioning the club as "an oasis for parched New Yorkers," but owner John Perona rejected it, arguing that the name suggested an "arid desert." As El Morocco, the venue became what has been described as "one of the most caste-conscious, costly and cloistered night clubs in the world." Its regular clientele consisted of fashionable society, politicians, and entertainers. Lucille Ball and Desi Arnaz had their wedding reception at El Morocco in 1940. Part of what made the club the "place to be" was the photographs taken by Jerome Zerbe, which were always in the news the next day. Everyone always knew where the celebrities had been from the background zebra stripes on the banquettes.

The neighborhood started changing after World War II. Eventually, Perona moved the El Morocco to a four-story townhouse at 307 East 54th Street, on the north side of the street near the corner of Second Avenue, in January 1961. After his death in June 1961, his son, Edwin, took over the proprietorship. Later that year, Edwin Perona sold the club to John Mills, who owned it for three years.

From 1964 and 1970, El Morocco was owned by Maurice Uchitel and Sheldon Hazeltine. Before taking over, Uchitel owned the Eden Roc Hotel in Miami Beach for several years. El Morocco closed on May 23, 1970 and re-opened as a private club in 1971.

In 1981, the Second Avenue wing operated briefly as a steakhouse. In 1992, it operated as a topless bar. In 1997, Desmond Wootton bought the property and opened the Night Owls nightclub. The site is now occupied by the Milan Condominium.

== In pop culture ==
- In the “Lucy Is Envious” episode of I Love Lucy, which aired 3/29/1954, Lucy is reading the society section of the paper, learning that her old, and very wealthy school friend Cynthia, is in town. The article talks about the opera opening the night before, and all of the parties that the attendees went to afterwards, including at 21 Club and El Morocco.
- The 1955 film My Sister Eileen includes the club, starring Janet Leigh and Jack Lemmon.
- The club is a setting for a scene in the 1973 Arthur Laurents film The Way We Were. Katie Morosky spots a nodding-off Hubbell Gardiner at the bar, and a flashback ensues.
- A fictionalized version of the club featuring distinctive zebra-striped banquettes is featured in the Woody Allen movie Cafe Society (2016). The club is referenced in Woody Allen's movie Radio Days (1987).
- John Perona, billed as the club's "owner and operator", appeared as a mystery guest on the television show What's My Line on April 6, 1958. The particular panel included three regular panelists, Orson Welles. Perona himself was so well known that the panelists were blindfolded and he disguised his voice, following the show's custom with readily identifiable guests.
- Allen Cooper takes Anne Welles to the El Morocco in the 1966 novel Valley of the Dolls by Jacqueline Susann.

== Bibliography ==
- Beebe, Lucius (1967). The Lucius Beebe Reader. Charles Clegg and Duncan Emrich (eds.). New York: Doubleday.
- Zerbe, Jerome (1937). John Perona's El Morocco Family Album. Introduction by Lucius Beebe. New York: privately published.
- Zerbe, Jerome (1934). People on Parade. Introduction by Lucius Beebe. New York: D. Kemp.
