= Center for Railroad Photography & Art =

Coordinates: 43°04′13.3″N 89°27′08.1″W

The Center for Railroad Photography & Art is a non-profit arts and education organization in Madison, Wisconsin, founded in 1997 to inform “the public about railroad photography and art through education, research and public service programs".

The Center collects high-quality photographs and works of art related to railroading and railroad workers. It has no museum, but collaborates with archives and public museums in creating programs with a national outreach. These programs include exhibitions, publications, conferences, and a website.

Incorporated as a nonprofit corporation in Wisconsin on December 9, 1997, the Center was fostered by John Gruber (1936-2018), a writer with a lifelong interest in railroads and their history who'd had the hobby of photographing railroads since 1960. The Railway and Locomotive History Society honored Gruber in 1994 with a lifetime achievement award in railroad photography.

== Exhibitions ==
The Center’s first exhibition, "Railroads and Photography: 150 Years of Great Images", opened in 1999 at Railfair at the California State Railroad Museum in Sacramento, later traveling to Altoona, Pennsylvania; Madison, Wisconsin; Lake Forest and Champaign, Illinois; St. Louis, Missouri; Carson City and Ely, Nevada; and Kennesaw, Georgia.

Beginning in 2003, with support from the North American Railroad Foundation, the Center created seven photography exhibitions on the theme of “Representations of Railroad Work, Past and Present”. These were shown on both coasts and in the Midwest, notably at Grand Central Terminal in New York City and the state capitol in Madison, Wisconsin. A summary report was titled "It’s Work".

In 2006, the Center mounted an exhibition of photography and watercolors by artist Ted Rose, who was asked by the U.S. Postal Service to create railroad-themed U.S. postage stamps. The exhibition, which was shown at the Haggerty Museum of Marquette University in Milwaukee and the California State Railroad Museum, was accompanied by a catalog that summarizes Rose’s life and career. The Center also collaborated with Thomas H. Garver to prepare an exhibition (at the Southeast Missouri Regional Museum in Cape Girardeau and the California State Railroad Museum) about the photographs of O. Winston Link, the famed railroad photographer and sound recorder.

== Railroad Heritage ==
The Center publishes a journal, Railroad Heritage. Early issues carried articles about noted photographers and artists, plus news of contemporary events. Others have been devoted to conference proceedings, the role of women in railroading, representations of work in railroad photography and art, and the photography of Lucius Beebe and Charles Clegg.

The Center also published 20 Memorable Railroad Photographs of the 20th Century. In it were the following works:

- "Pennsylvania Special at Bergen Cut, 1902" – Frank W. Blauvelt
- "Fast freight near Fairchild, Wisconsin, 1904" – J. Foster Adams
- "Empire State Express, panned at 70 mph, 1911" – William G. Landon
- "Spirit of Transportation,” 20th Century Limited, Chicago, 1918" – King Daniel Ganaway
- "Broadway Limited at night, Latrobe, Pennsylvania, 1930" – Perrie Mahaffey
- "Chesapeake & Ohio, Clifton Forge, Virginia, 1944" – William Rittase
- "Capitol Limited, leaving Chicago in winter, 1930" – Alfred W. Johnson (photographer)
- "End of track, San Luis Valley Southern, Blanca, Colorado, 1940s" – Charles M. Clegg
- "The Mohawk, New York Central No. 3005, Shelby, Ohio, 1955" – Philip R. Hastings
- "Maud Bows to the Virginia Creeper, 1956" – O. Winston Link
- "Phoebe Snow at Scranton, Pennsylvania, 1964" – David Plowden
- "Southern Pacific steam helper at Saugus, California, 1947" – Dick Steinheimer
- "Union Pacific Big Boy, No. 4015, 1950s" – Robert Hale (photographer)
- "Maryland & Pennsylvania, Gross Trestle, 1955" – James P. Gallagher
- "Chicago & North Western, Madison, Wisconsin, 1955" – William D. Middleton
- "Central Vermont No. 20, the Washingtonian, St. Albans, Vermont, 1956" – Jim Shaughnessy
- "Union Pacific Challenger #3712 pushes train out of Ogden, Utah, 1956" - H.W. Griffiths
- "Sierra Railroad, “First Light, Canyon Tank,” 1985" – Ted Benson
- "Steam Locomotive silhouette, Cloquet, Minnesota, 1962" – John Gruber
- "Sunrise, D&RGW main line between Cedar and Mounds, Utah, 1996" – Mel Patrick

== Public programs ==
Since 2003, the Center has sponsored annual conferences and an awards program for contemporary railroad photography. In 2006, conferences in Milwaukee and in College Station, Texas, observed the centennial of the diesel locomotive with historical presentations and discussions of the diesel’s effect on railroad art. Public programs have accompanied each exhibition.

== Internet archive ==
In 2007, with support from the North American Railway Foundation, the Center launched a descriptive website, railroadheritage.org. It reproduced images related to railroading from the 1840s to the present, coupled with explanatory texts that describe the images’ content and their historical, technological, and aesthetic importance. The images were drawn from the Center’s collections and public and private collections around the country. Several museums and archives collaborated in the effort. In 2008, the Center extracted 32 images from railroadheritage.org and created "American Railroad History in a Nutshell," a feature on the site that depicts and describes, in a digest form, the importance of railroads, their development, and some social historical elements of railroads and railroading.
