= Virginia and Truckee Railroad =

Heritage railroad in Virginia City, Nevada

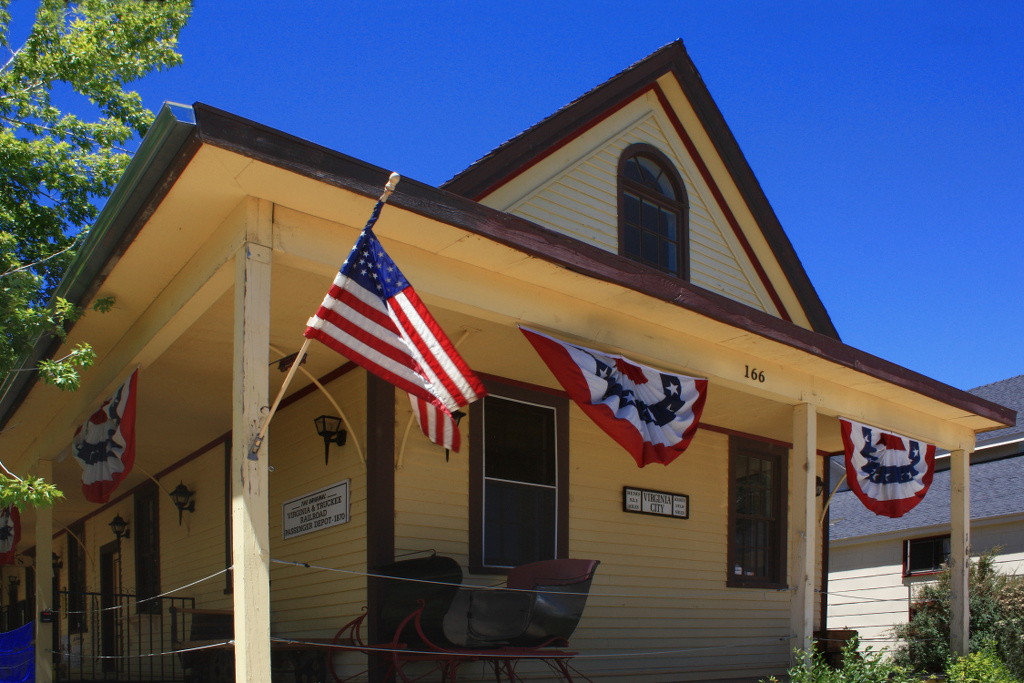
- The original V&T passenger depot in Virginia City, July 10, 2016

Overview
- Headquarters: Virginia City, Nevada
- Reporting mark: VT
- Locale: Nevada
- Dates of operation: 1870–1950; 1976–present

Technical
- Track gauge: 4 ft 8 1/2 in (1,435 mm) standard gauge
- Length: 14 miles (23 km)

Other
- Website: www.virginiatruckee.com; vtrailway.com

Nevada Historical Marker
- Reference no.: 248

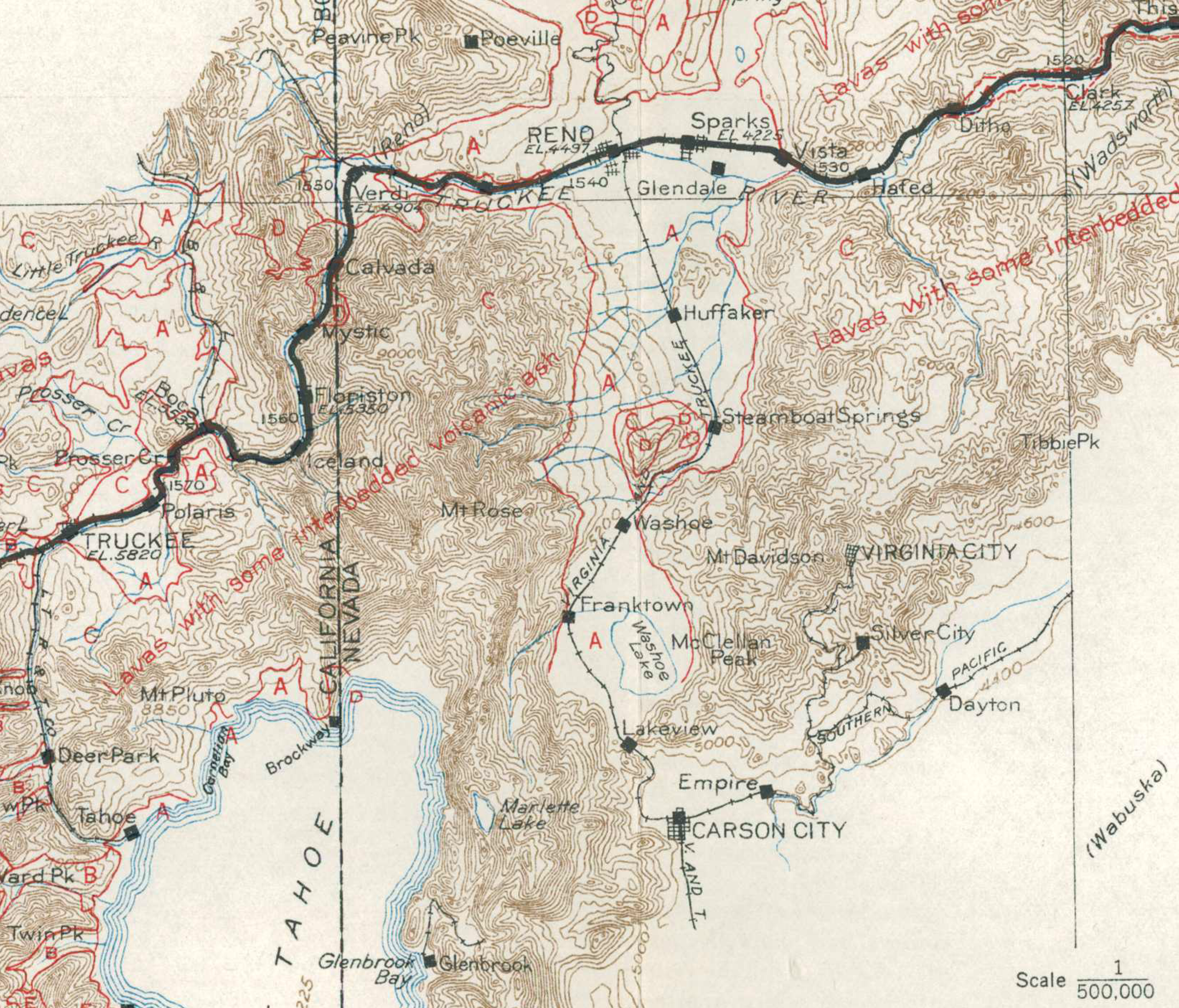
1915 map showing the route of the Virginia and Truckee Railroad

The Virginia and Truckee Railroad (stylized as Virginia & Truckee Railroad) (reporting mark VT) is a privately owned heritage railroad, headquartered in Virginia City, Nevada. Its private and publicly owned route is 14 miles (23 km) long. When first constructed in the 19th century, it was a commercial freight railroad which was originally built to serve the Comstock Lode mining communities of northwestern Nevada.

At its height, the railroad's route ran from Reno south to the state capital at Carson City. In Carson City, the mainline split into two branches. One branch continued south to Minden, while the other branch traveled east to Virginia City. The first section from Virginia City to Carson City was constructed beginning in 1869 to haul ore, lumber and supplies for the Comstock Lode silver mines. After the federal and state governments began competing with the railroad with highways that operated at a loss, the railroad was abandoned in 1950 after years of declining revenue, constrained by the requirement to turn a profit. Much of the track was pulled up and sold, along with the remaining locomotives and cars. In the 1970s, with public interest in historic railroads on the rise, efforts began to rebuild the line. The portion from Virginia City to Gold Hill has been rebuilt by private interests, and is operated separately from a portion from Gold Hill to Mound House, that was rebuilt with public funding and private donations.

Prior to the building of the Virginia & Truckee Railroad, the lower grade ore that was mined was dumped, rather than processed, because of the high cost of shipping it to the mills by wagon. The railroad brought lower cost transportation ($2.00 (Note: equivalent to $51 in 2025 adjusted for inflation) per ton for transporting ore, versus the previous $3.50 (Note: equivalent to $89 in 2025 adjusted for inflation) per ton by wagon), which resulted in the leaner ores going to the mills, rather than to waste. The cost of lumber shipped in for mine timbers and other construction also dropped significantly as a result of low-cost rail transportation. Bank of California agent William Sharon estimated that the railroad would produce a savings of nearly a million dollars a year on freight charges.

Fuel costs on the Comstock dropped by about 30% as result of the lower cost of rail transportation to get it there, and Virginia City entered into a soaring period of prosperity.

== History ==
=== Comstock Lode ===
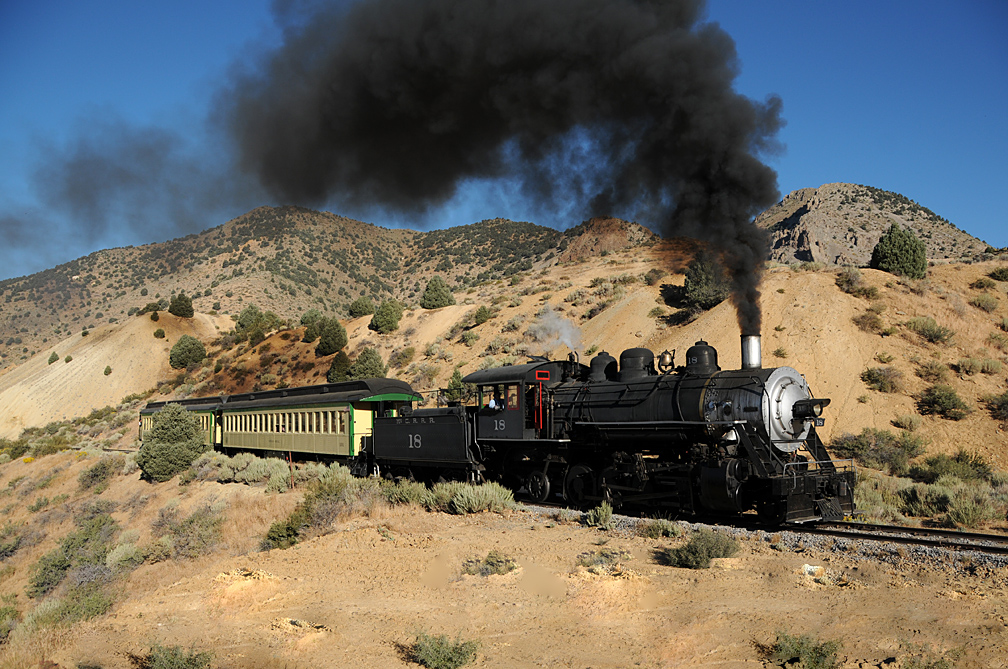
Restored V&T railroad

Gold was discovered in Nevada (then western Utah Territory) in spring 1850, by a company of Mormon emigrants on their way to the California Gold Rush. These early travelers only lingered in Nevada until they could cross the Sierras. By 1858 prospectors were soon permanently camping in the area around what is now Virginia City. In 1859, gold was found in outcroppings in the hills and canyons just outside what is now Virginia City. Among the gold ore in these outcroppings were bluish chunks of silver ore which clogged the rockers. Silver was not recognized in this form, so initially, it was overlooked in favor of the gold, and later found to be quite valuable. This was the first of the silver from what came to be called the Comstock Lode.

Numerous mills appeared along the Carson River from Dayton to Brunswick (toward Eagle Valley (Carson City)) to process the ore from the Comstock Lode. Low interest rates enticed mine and mill owners alike to finance through the bank. Many of these mills and some mines were built with loans from the Bank of California, whose Nevada agent, William Sharon, would foreclose upon the mines or mills when their owners defaulted on payments. The bank gradually came into possession of many important mining and ore-processing facilities. Sharon, along with business partners Darius Ogden Mills and William Ralston, formed the bank-owned Union Mill & Mining Company to process the ore from the mills that had been foreclosed upon.

Initially, the Comstock Lode was a boon for the Virginia City area, as the city grew to over 25,000 inhabitants at its height, and was among the largest and wealthiest towns in the West. However, from the beginning, the costs to transport Comstock ore to the mills from points on the Lode (as well as to return wood and lumber to supply the mines) became so great that many mines were closed, and only the higher quality ores were worth processing in the mines that stayed open. Being in control of mines and mills with his partners, Sharon realized that a cheap form of transportation between the mines, the mills, and the cities would allow the banks holdings to be more profitable.

=== Early years ===
There were many propositions starting as early as 1861 for railroads to service the area and decrease costs. Sharon eventually (with the addition of $500,000 (Note: equivalent to $17.9 million in 2025 adjusted for inflation) in county bonds to move the railroad), envisioned a railroad to run from Virginia City, through Gold Hill where the first of the Comstock Lode was mined, passing the mills along the river, and ending at the state capital, Carson City. When finished, this route would cover 21 miles (34 km), descend 1,575 feet (480 m) of elevation and have so many curves as to make 17 full circles in the thirteen and a half miles from the river to Virginia City. Ground was broken on February 18, 1869, two miles below Gold Hill on American Flats when grading crews went to work. There were seven tunnels on the line, requiring 2–5 months each to hole through, and an 85 ft tall, 500 ft long trestle built over the Crown Point ravine. The first track was laid and the ceremonial first spike driven on September 28, 1869, by superintendent Henry M. Yerington, with the first passenger train pulling into Virginia City on January 29, 1870. The railroad served as a reliable connection for residents of Carson City and Virginia City. By December 1869, special rail cars were outfitted to bring theater patrons from Carson City to Virginia City for Piper's Opera House presentations.

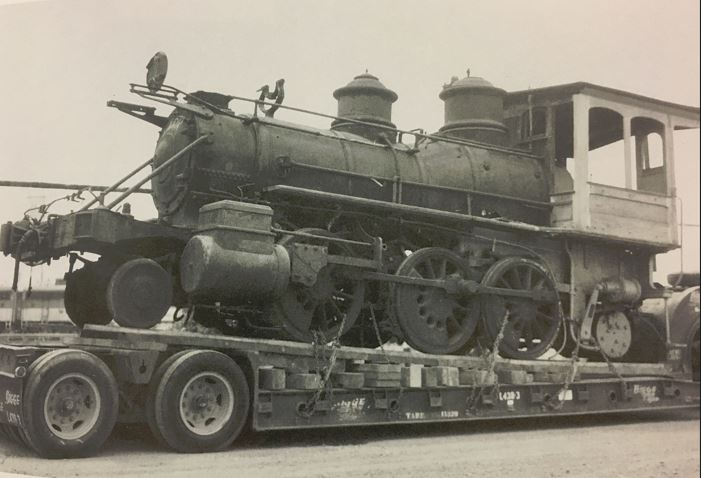
Virginia & Truckee RR 13, "Empire", before restoration. Its last owner was the Pacific Portland Cement Company in Gerlach, NV, in the 20th century.

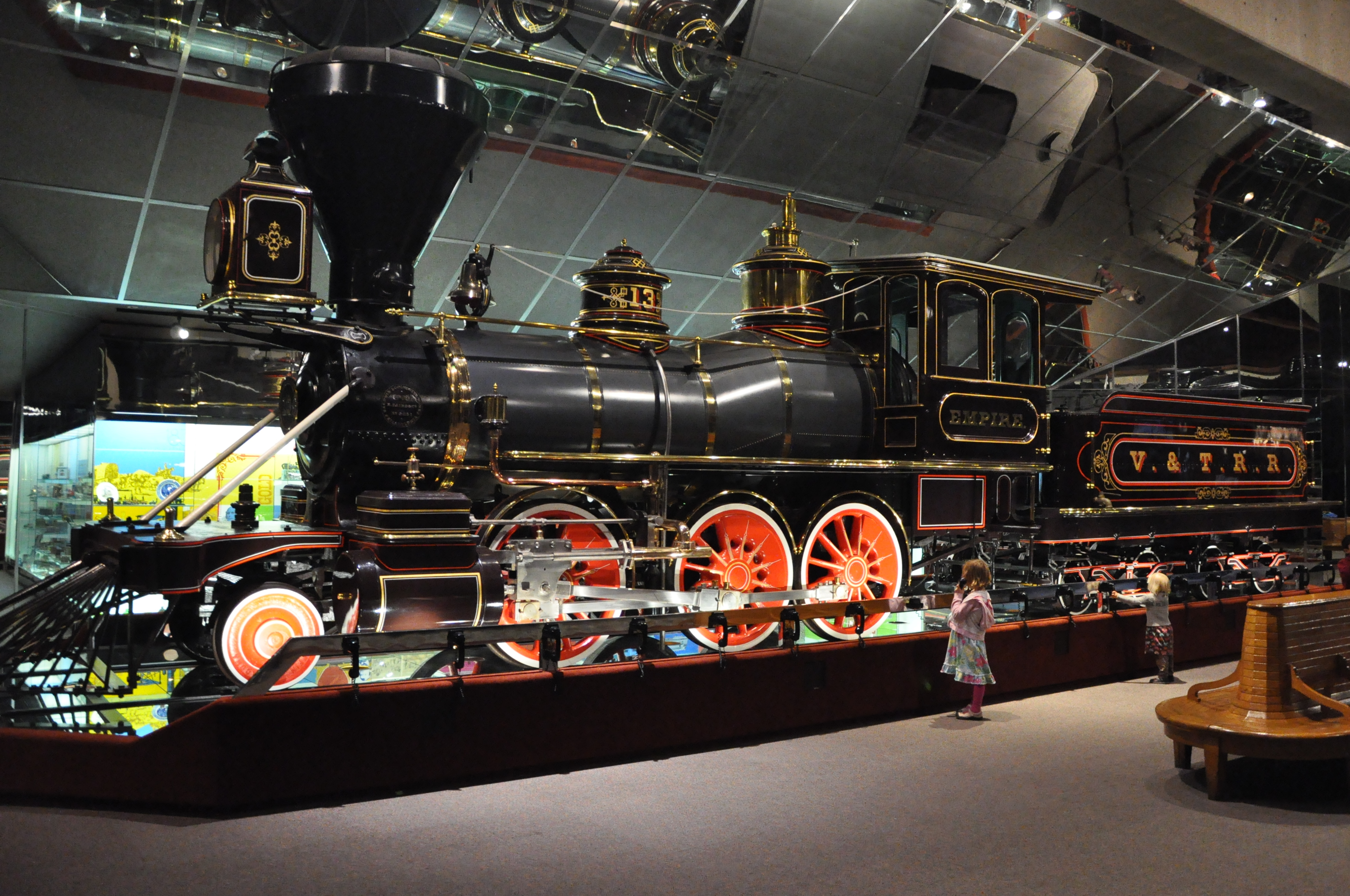
Virginia & Truckee 13, "Empire", after restoration, at the California State Railroad Museum.

Named the Lyon, engine No. 1 was one of three 2-6-0's purchased from H.J. Booth by the fledgling railroad, along with engine No. 2, the Ormsby, and No. 3, the Storey. The railroad placed orders for five locomotives, three from H.J. Booth and two from Baldwin Locomotive Works in Philadelphia, Pennsylvania. The first three of the five original locomotives purchased were named after Nevada counties (Lyon, Ormsby, and Storey). The last two of the five, built by Baldwin, were engine No. 4, the Virginia, and engine No. 5, the Carson, named after Nevada cities. The Booth and Baldwin locomotives were disassembled at Reno on a Central Pacific siding. The "Lyon", "Ormsby" and "Storey" were hauled to Carson via Washoe Valley and reassembled in the shops. The "Virginia" and "Carson" were hauled up Geiger Grade from Reno to Virginia City and then reassembled. They had the distinction of being the first locomotives in Virginia City. The Lyon, with the distinction of being the first locomotive for the V&T RR, was also the engine that pulled the work train, arriving in Virginia City on January 28, 1870, and completing the initially planned route. The line was opened in its entirety on January 29 with regular passenger service starting on February 1, 1870.

On November 12, 1869 V&T Engine no. 2 the "Storey", an H.J. Booth 2–6–0, pulled the first car of revenue for the company from Carson City to Gold Hill, a flat car loaded with lumber for the Crown Point Company. This milestone was also marked by the opening of the Crown Point Ravine trestle and the first crossing of the work train, engine No. 1 plus four cars, followed closely behind by engine No. 2, plus four cars (1 revenue). It is assumed that from the 12th to the 18th the railroad laid track (spurs) to service the local mines of Gold Hill, for without the track, the railroad could not get cars in to load. However, no sources have been found that reference this. On November 18, 1869, engine No. 1 hauled the railroads first revenue train of ore from the Yellow Jacket mine. By December 21, regular scheduled trains were running between Gold Hill and Carson City, hauling wood and lumber up the hill and ore back down to the mills.

The first lot of ore from the Yellow Jacket mine and in fact from the Comstock ledge - yet shipped over the railroad was sent down yesterday to the Yellow Jacket mill on Carson River. There were seven car loads of it, about eight and a half tons to the load, not far from 60 tons. This was from the 700 foot level of the old north mine, and dumped directly into the cars, the railroad passing within a few feet of the shaft. It is low grade ore, assaying $26 or $28 to the ton, and will yield under the stamps not far from $17 per ton. It is ore which heretofore was considered too poor to work and was accordingly used to fill up drifts with. The railroad now affords for the first time a chance to work this low grade ore profitably.

— "The First Ore Shipment", Gold Hill Daily News (November 19, 1869)

With the opening of the Virginia & Truckee, the cost of ore transportation via train cost $3/ton (Note: equivalent to $76 in 2025 adjusted for inflation) vs the previous $7/ton (Note: equivalent to $178 in 2025 adjusted for inflation) and a reduction in freight rates for lumber by almost half occurred, and the railroad could haul more material by the trainload, so mining activity increased, creating more business for the railroad. Sharon's idea of low cost transportation paid off.

The railroad cost $1,750,000 (Note: equivalent to $44.6 million in 2025 adjusted for inflation) to build, not including the cost of rolling stock or buildings. The V&T ran 30–45 trains per day at the height of the Big Bonanza from Carson to Virginia City and Gold Hill. Still primarily a freight railroad, there were 22 locomotives and 361 freight cars in use at the peak of the Virginia and Truckee operations (1876 & 1877), which carried over 400,000 tons of freight per month. This was in contrast to a mere 10 passenger cars.

=== Expansion and prosperity ===
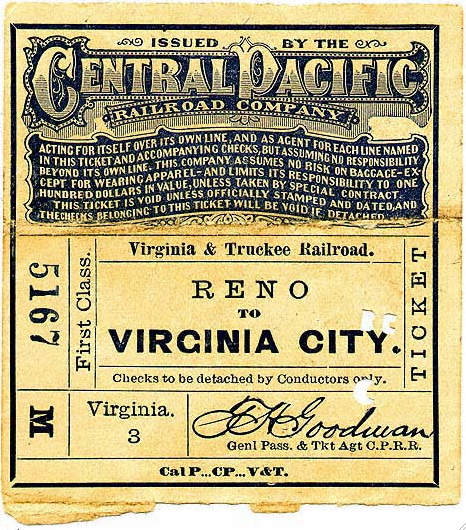
Central Pacific Railroad-issued ticket for passage from Reno to Virginia City, 1878

In late 1871, a line extension to Reno was begun, to connect the V&T line with the Central Pacific Railroad. This would allow through train service between Virginia City and San Francisco. Construction began with track being installed at the Reno end of the line. The final spike on the Reno extension was driven on August 24, 1872, and trains were being run that October. This milestone marked the completion of the Virginia and Truckee Railroad. In 1875, the railroad was earning a profit of over $100,000 (Note: equivalent to $2.93 million in 2025 adjusted for inflation) per month and started paying annual dividends of $360,000 (Note: equivalent to $10.6 million in 2025 adjusted for inflation) (or $30,000/month (Note: equivalent to $879,545 in 2025 adjusted for inflation)) to investors.

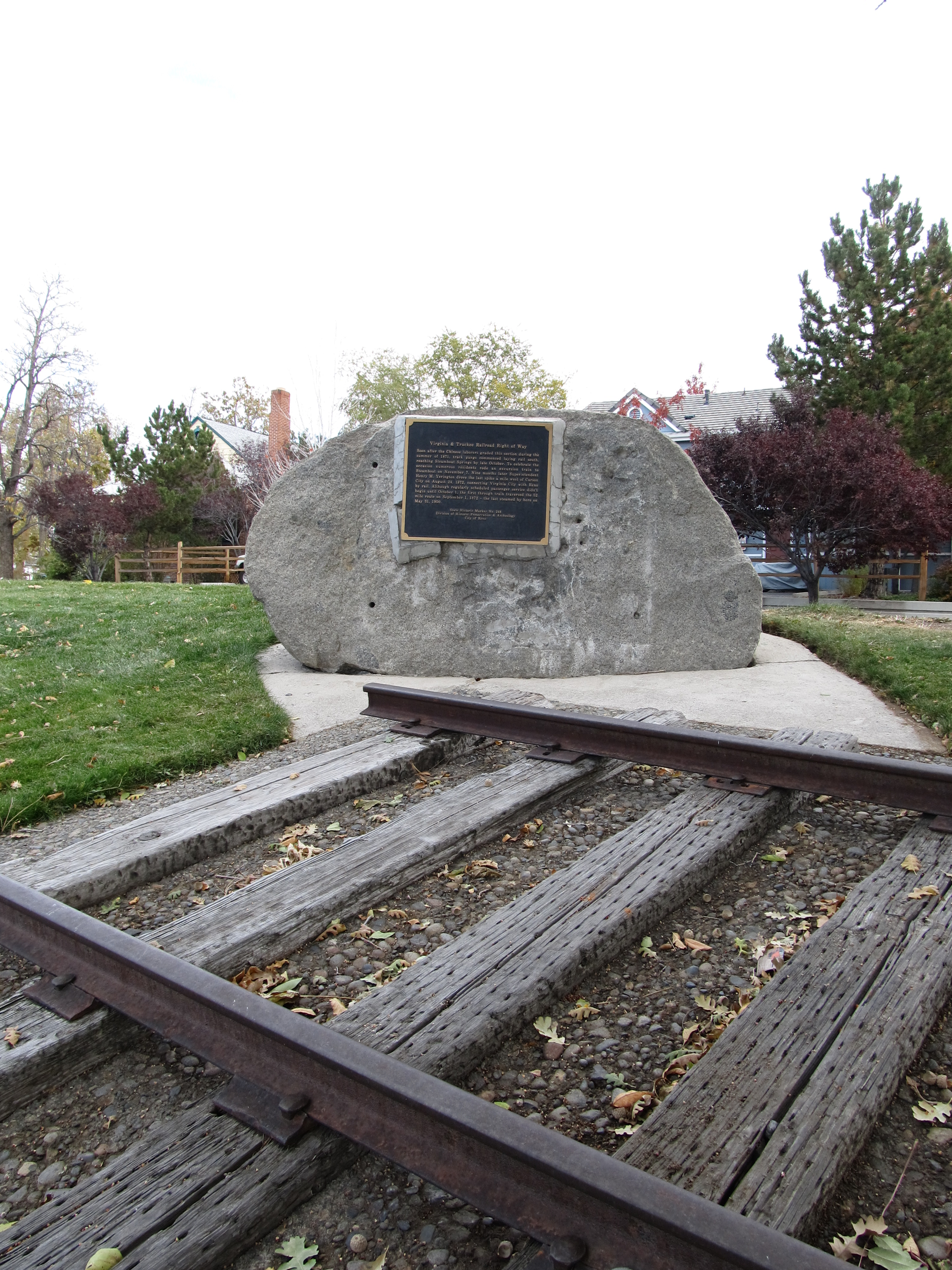
Virginia & Truckee Railroad Right of Way, Reno, Nevada Historical Marker No. 248. This grade was constructed in 1871 and in use until 1950.

In 1880, the V&T built a three-foot narrow gauge railroad called the Carson & Colorado (C&C). The railroad ran from Mound House, just east of Carson City, to the southern part of California, and supposedly to the Colorado River where new mining claims were being struck. This never did pan out, and by 1891 those claim sites were all but forgotten. A liability to the V&T, the "slim princess" was sold to the Southern Pacific Railroad in 1900. In the words of Ogden Mills, "Either we built this line 300 miles too short or 300 years too early", reflecting V&T's attitude towards the railroad.

Shortly after the sale of the C&C, silver was discovered at Tonopah, Nevada. The C&C became prosperous for the Southern Pacific (as well as the V&T, which had intermediate rail access), as wagon trains would run for miles through the desert to reach the narrow-gauge line, or later on the Tonopah and Goldfield Railroad which would then carry it back to the V&T at the Mound House junction. Because of the break of gauge between the Carson & Colorado and Virginia & Truckee, the Tonopah ore had to be unloaded by hand from the narrow-gauge cars and into the standard gauge cars at the C&C northern terminus, causing a backlog of traffic, as cars waited to be transferred. The problem caused by this was also apparent in delivering mining equipment and materials to the mines and the town of Tonopah which was in a building boom. Southern Pacific officials did not like this arrangement, so in 1904 they converted the narrow gauge C&C to standard gauge from Mound House to Mina, renamed the Nevada & California Railroad. This allowed Southern Pacific trains to run along the V&T through to Mound House to the Nevada & California, and on down to Tonopah. In addition, the Southern Pacific (controlled at the time by the Union Pacific Railroad) offered to buy the Virginia & Truckee, but the V&T officials set their price too high (according to Union Pacific president Harriman). Instead, the Southern Pacific built their own line from the closest available intersection with the former C&C. The line ran 28 miles from Hazen to Fort Churchill and connected their own main lines, thus bypassing the V&T entirely.

In 1904, the corporation changed its name to the Virginia and Truckee Railway. In response to agricultural and cattle ranch concerns, the V&T built a short branch line to Minden, about 26 miles south of Carson City, in 1906. This branch line brought in increased freight traffic. As a result, the V&T purchased three new ten-wheelers from Baldwin: (the first) No. 25, 26, and 27, in 1905, 1907, and 1913, respectively.

=== Decline of the railroad ===
The Virginia and Truckee's decline began as early as 1924, the first year in which the railroad failed to make a profit. Mining revenue had dropped off to very low levels, though revenue from the Minden line continued to flow. Passenger revenue was on a steady decline, due to the increased use of the automobile on the ever-expanding highway system in the US. US 395 ran alongside the V&T from Minden all the way up to Reno, and US 50 ran from south of Carson City over to Mound House and the turnoff to Nevada State Route 17 (later NV 341), the route to Virginia City.

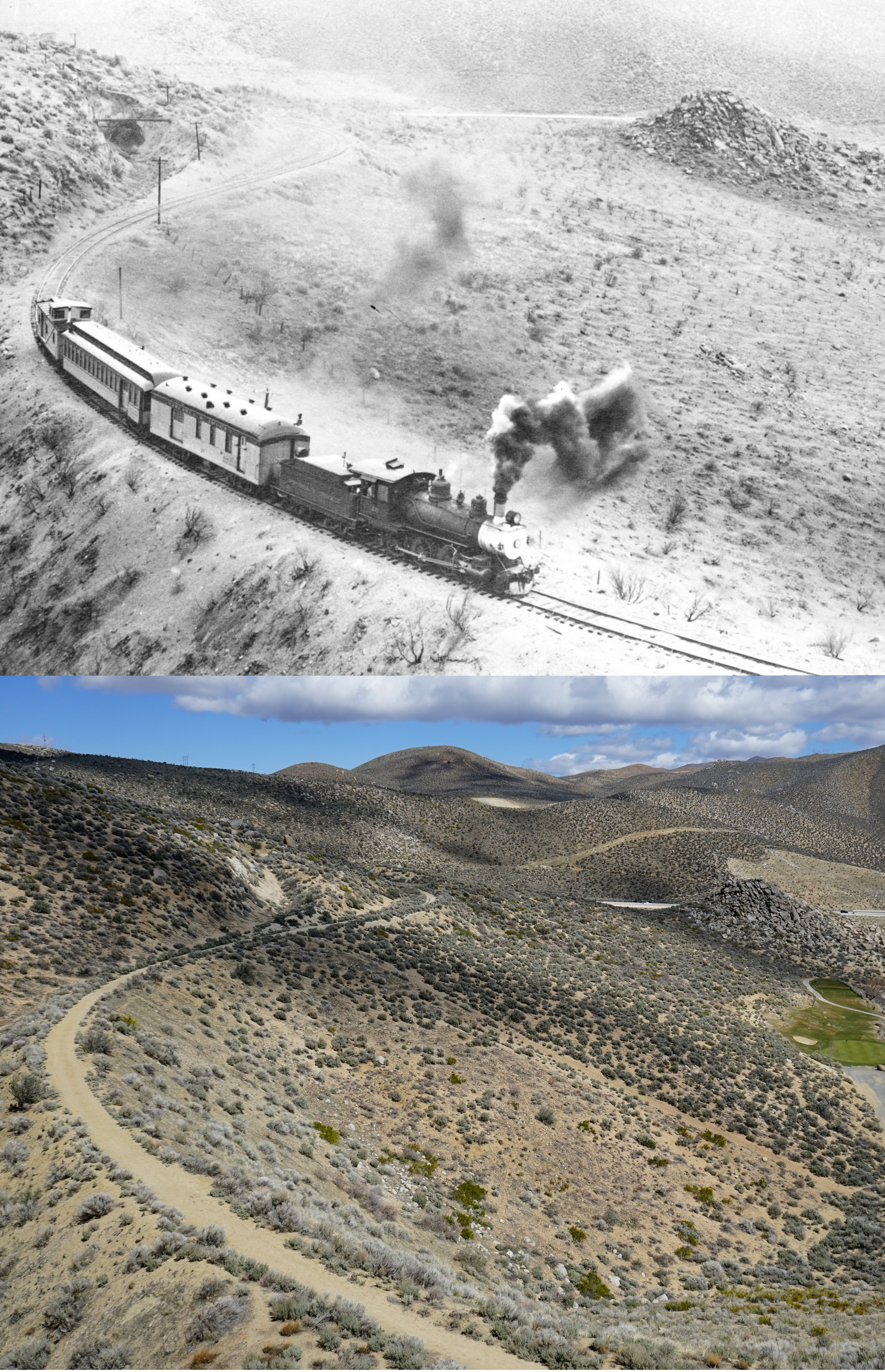
V&T train near collapsed Tunnel #1, around 1940, and the same view in 2014, both photos showing the shoofly (detour) around the collapsed tunnel

The sole owner of the railroad in 1933 was Ogden Livingston Mills, grandson of original co-founder Darius Ogden Mills. He personally paid the deficits in the railroad's operating costs as a nod to the past and his family's involvement in the early days of Virginia City. In 1938, a year after Mills' death, the railroad went into receivership, and its management began making plans to cease operations, with the Virginia City branch already having been dismantled during that year. At the time of the railroad's closure, it had only three locomotives operating, the second No. 25 as well as numbers 26 and 27 (all 4-6-0's built by Baldwin in 1905, 1907, and 1913, respectively). No. 26 was originally scheduled to haul the last train, but after making its run on May 1, 1950, the single-stall locomotive shed it was stored in on the banks of the Truckee River in Reno caught fire. No. 26, deemed a total loss, was scrapped, and the road instead restored No. 27 for the occasion. On May 31, 1950, No. 27 pulled the Virginia and Truckee's final train.

Lucius Beebe, a noted railroad historian, settled in Virginia City with Charles Clegg, a photographer, and helped to revitalize the town and interest in the railroad by writing books about the Virginia & Truckee as well as other narrow gauge railroads, such as the Carson and Colorado Railroad, Denver and Rio Grande Railroad, and Rio Grande Southern Railroad.

=== Restoring the line ===
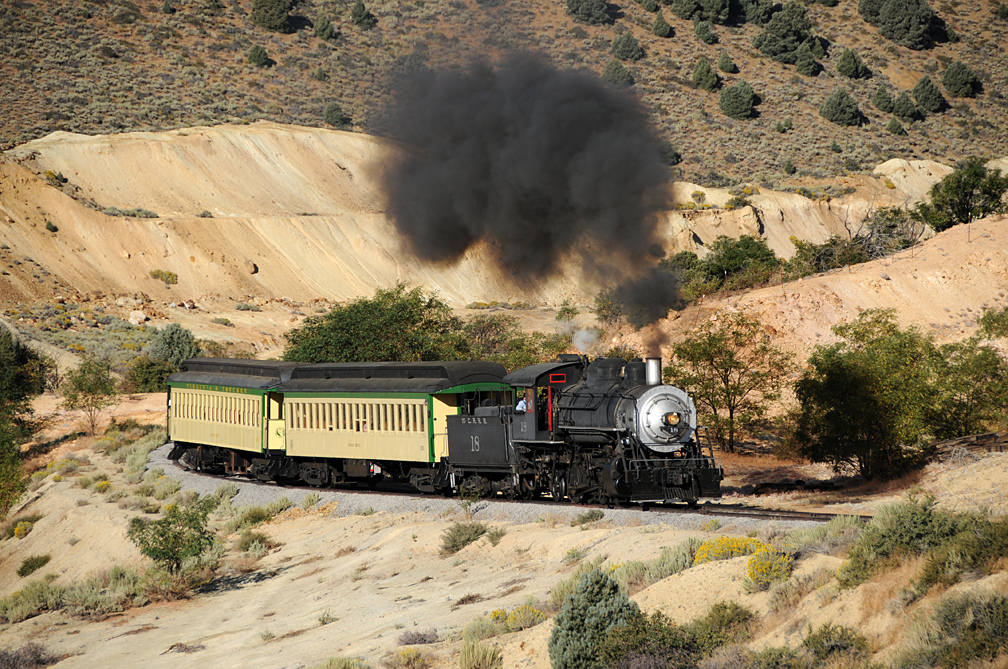
Train operating on the restored line

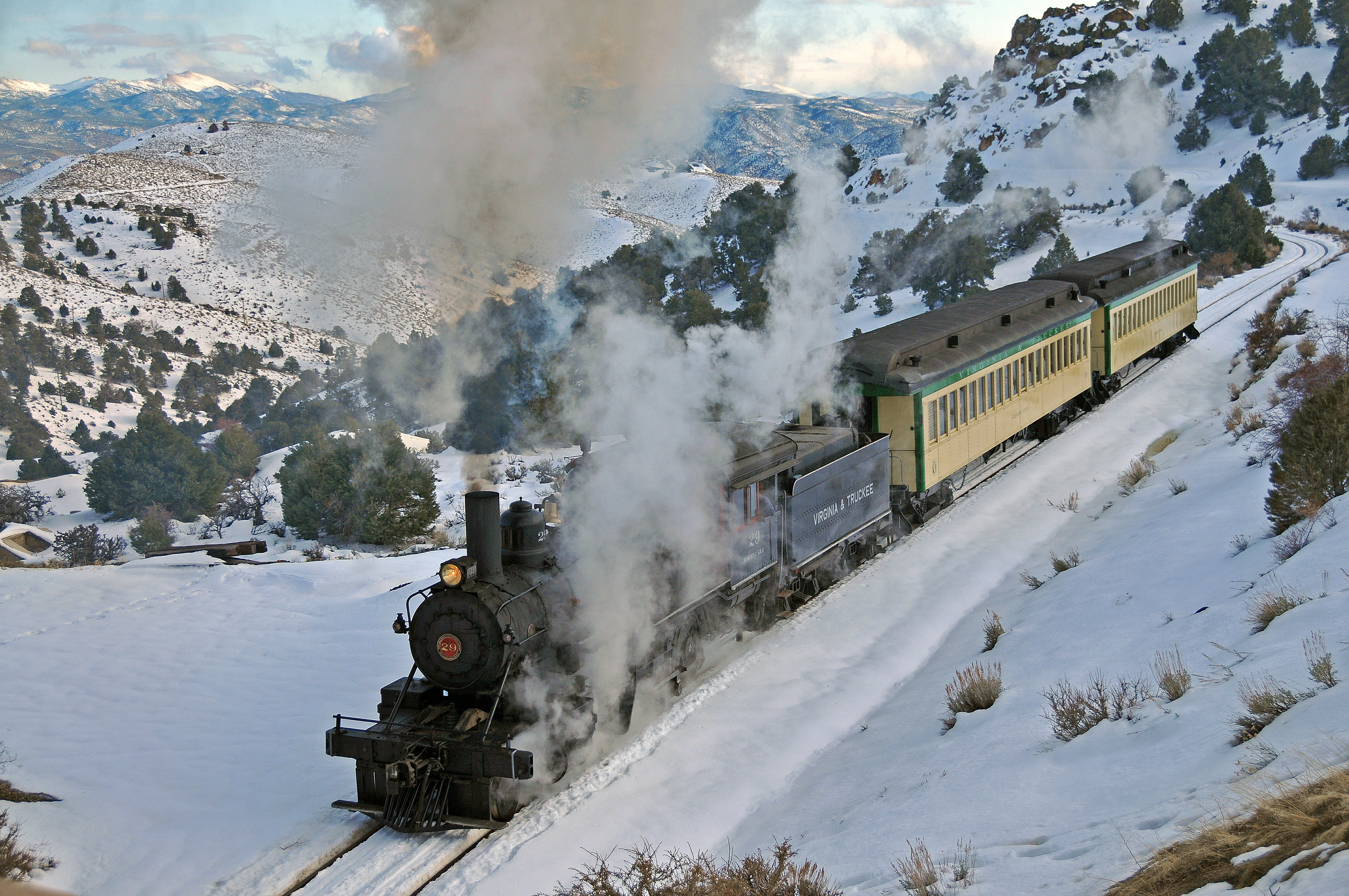
Winter excursion, south end of Virginia City, March 2010

In 1972, a Virginia City railroad enthusiast, Robert C. Gray, who as a young man was one of the passengers on the last train to Virginia City in 1938, sought to rebuild the V&T as a tourist line. After gaining approval from Storey County, reconstruction of the line began from F Street to the Eastern portal of Tunnel #4. Work to re-open Tunnel #4 continued until it was finally reopened in the late 1980s. Work had started on Tunnel #3 (which had a history of instability to the point that regular passenger cars could no longer fit by the time the last trains ran in 1938), but a large boulder shifted and buried the tunnel. A shoofly was built around the tunnel, just enough as to not be too sharp for the locomotives, opening up a view of the valley.

Officials with the public Nevada Commission for the Reconstruction of the V&T Railway held a "silver spike" ceremony on January 3, 2006, in Carson City to commemorate the completion of two miles of track near Gold Hill. The construction, completed in September 2005, was part of an effort to restore the V&T's mainline from Virginia City to Carson City for operations. Then-Senate Minority Leader Harry Reid (D-Nev), who was instrumental in securing $10 million (Note: equivalent to $16.5 million in 2025 adjusted for inflation) in federal funding for the project, and Nevada Lieutenant Governor Lorraine Hunt, who secured an additional $1 million (Note: equivalent to $1.65 million in 2025 adjusted for inflation) in state funding for the project, both spoke at the ceremony. The completion of the first phase of the extension saw the last train of the day venturing beyond Gold Hill and to American Flats, over a massive fill of the Overman Pit, near the Crown Point Ravine. This practice has been abandoned in recent years, though.

In June 2008, #29 returned to operation after a significant overhaul.

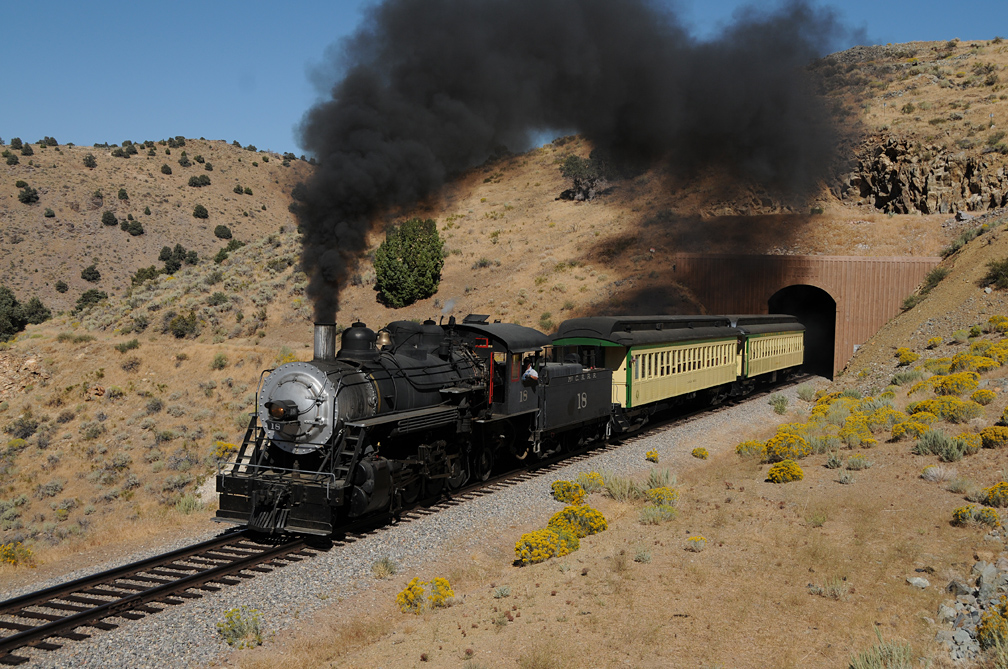
No. 18 coming out of Tunnel #4, September 20, 2011

The Commission subsequently rebuilt the line from Gold Hill (connection with the current V&T Railroad) to Carson City, running the first train over the line in 68 years on August 14, 2009. The ceremonial first run from Virginia City to Mound House (referred to as "Carson City Eastgate" in official material) occurred for VIPs. On the 15th and 16th the line opened to the public.

In 2006, it was estimated that completion of the line from Gold Hill to downtown Carson City would cost in excess of $55 million, (Note: equivalent to $87.8 million in 2025 adjusted for inflation) and it was planned that the line, which was originally abandoned in 1938, would be completed and fully operational once again in 2012. However, as of 2026, trains only go as far as Eastgate Station, in eastern Carson City.

== Historic equipment ==
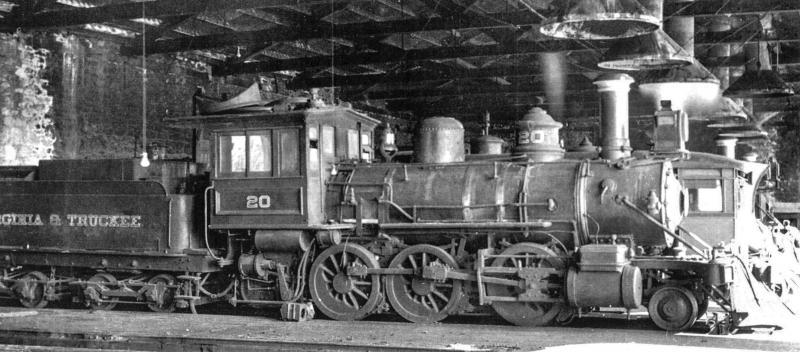
Virginia & Truckee RR 20, "Tahoe", in the Carson Enginehouse.

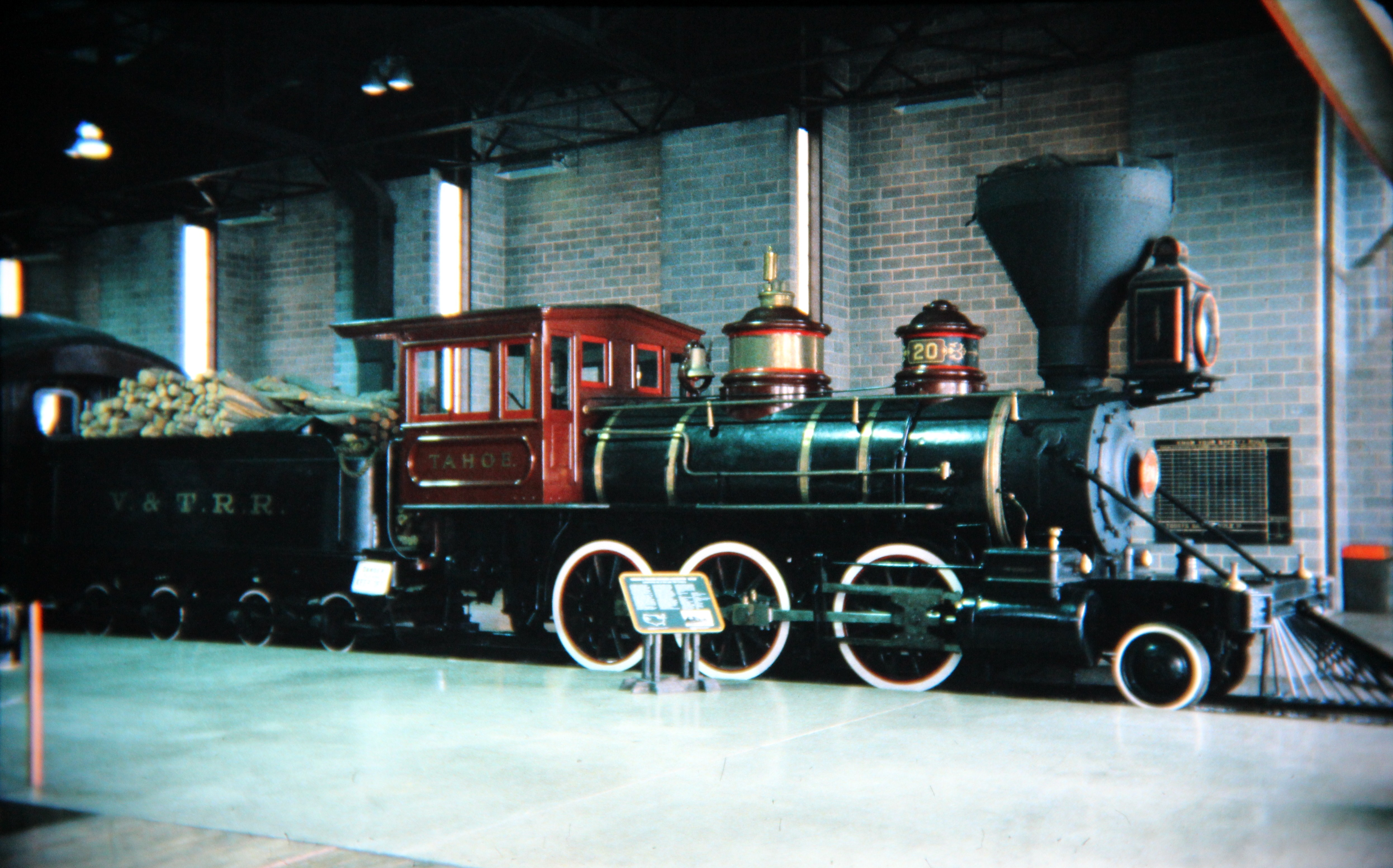
Virginia & Truckee RR 20, "Tahoe" (after restoration) at the Railroad Museum of Pennsylvania.

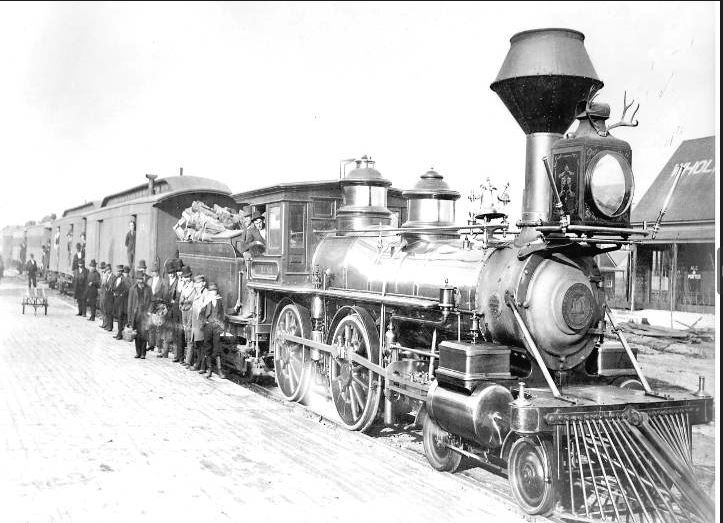
Built in 1872, the Virginia & Truckee No. 11, the "Reno" was the V&T's first true passenger engine. It was the pride of the fleet, and was assigned to the pull the "Lightning Express", the V&T's premier train in the 1800s. The engine was damaged by a fire in 1995, and is currently undergoing restoration by the V&T. (Nevada State Railroad Museum collection).

The Virginia and Truckee's locomotives and other equipment appeared in numerous Westerns over the years since the railroad operated otherwise obsolete equipment well into the "cinema age". Many of these pieces have been restored and are on display at museums throughout the country. Cars and locomotives from the original railroad are on display at the Nevada State Railroad Museum in Carson City, at the Comstock History Center on C Street in Virginia City, at the California State Railroad Museum in Sacramento and at the Railroad Museum of Pennsylvania in Strasburg. In addition, an operating 5/8-scale replica of the V&T locomotive, "Reno", has been running on the Washington Park and Zoo Railway since 1959. On April 18, 2018, the Nevada State Railroad Museum swapped No. 18 "Dayton" for No. 27. The engine will now be in the Comstock Historic Center, and the Dayton will reside in Carson City. On March 2, 2020, the replica of V&T No. 1 was shipped to Carson City, where it will reside at the Nevada State Railroad Museum and will be completed.

=== Locomotives ===
Locomotive details
No.	Name	Image	Type	Builder	C/N	Built	NRHP Ref. #	Status	Notes
1	Lyon (Replica)		2-6-0	H.J. Booth	11 (orig.)	1869 (orig.)	-	Under construction	Replica being constructed at Nevada State Railroad Museum
12	Genoa		4-4-0	Baldwin Locomotive Works	3090	1873	-	Display	Owned by the California State Railroad Museum, on a two-year loan to the Nevada State Railroad Museum.
13	Empire		2-6-0	Baldwin Locomotive Works	3091	1873	-	Display	On display at the California State Railroad Museum
18	Dayton		4-4-0	CP's Sacramento shops	Sac 6	1873	73002245	Display	Owned by the Nevada State Railroad Museum, on a two-year loan to the California State Railroad Museum.
20	Tahoe		2-6-0	Baldwin Locomotive Wirks	3687	1875	-	Display	On display at the Railroad Museum of Pennsylvania.
21	J.W.Bowker		2-4-0	Baldwin Locomotive Works	3689	1875	-	Display	Owned by the California State Railroad Museum, on a two-year loan to the Nevada State Railroad Museum
22	Inyo		4-4-0	Baldwin Locomotive Works	3693	1875	73002245	Operational	On display at the Nevada State Railroad Museum.
25 (2nd)	Unnamed		4-6-0	Baldwin Locomotive Works	25016	1905	-	Operational	Owned by the Nevada State Railroad Museum.
27	Unnamed		4-6-0	Baldwin Locomotive Works	39453	1913	04001198	Display	On display at the Comstock History Center at Virginia City, Nevada.

=== Other Historic designations ===
- National Register of Historic Places #NPS–77001508 — Virginia and Truckee Railroad Shops
- National Register of Historic Places #NPS–98001208 — Virginia and Truckee Railroad Depot - Carson City
- National Historic Landmark #NPS–05000968 — Virginia and Truckee Railway Motor Car 22

== Operations ==
In May 2013, the railroad acquired a GE 44-ton switcher engine and three passenger cars from the defunct Yuma Valley Railway. The diesel has been given the number D-3.

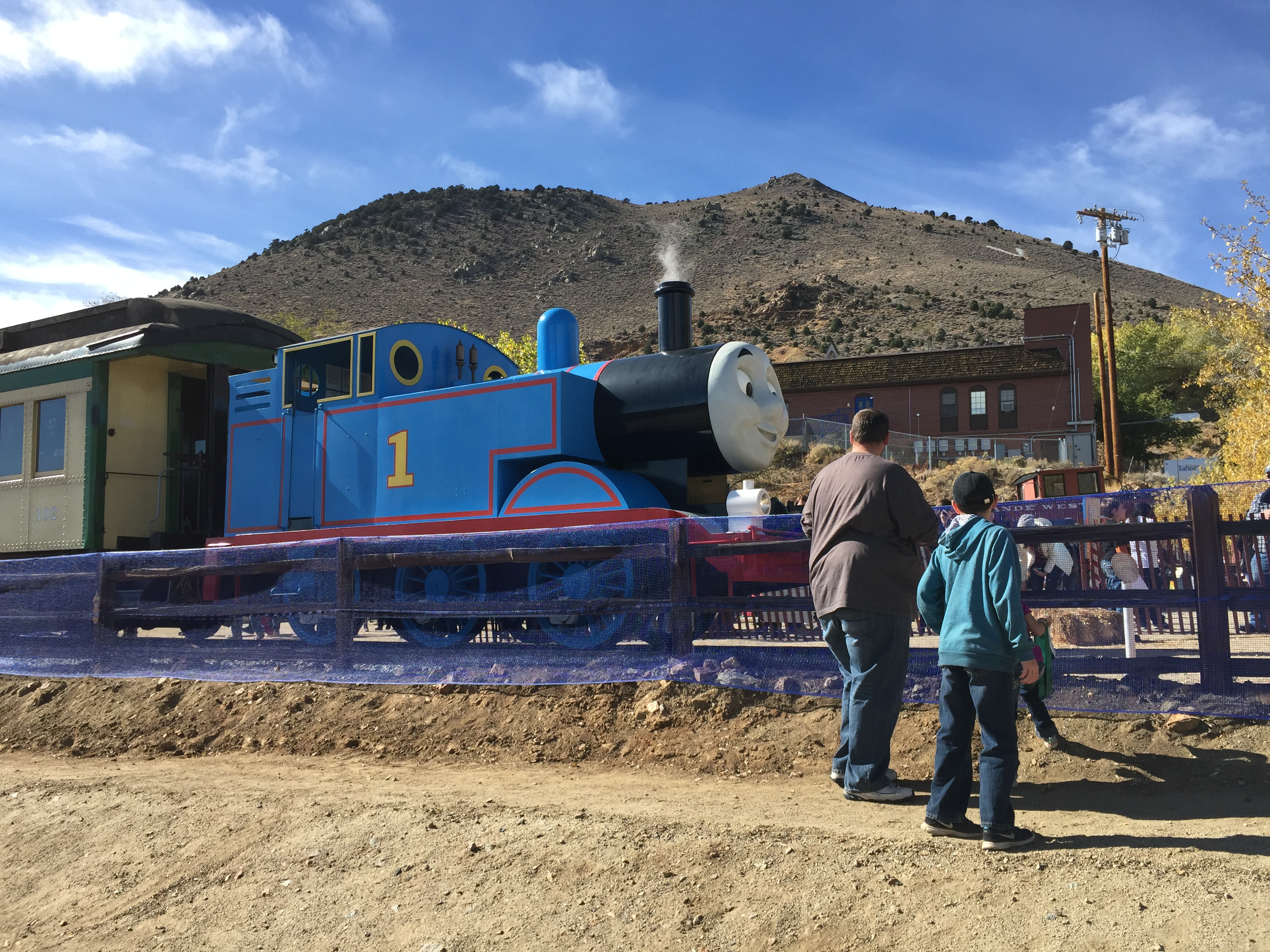
Visiting replica of Thomas the Tank Engine

In November 2016, the railroad acquired an EMD SW1200 from Evraz, numbered 3540.

2020 saw the acquisition of a second bay-window caboose, No. 52, from Jim Dobbas, Inc. in Antelope, California. The caboose, a former Union Pacific CA-11 steel caboose built in 1979 as No. 25852, began being used on daily trains to Gold Hill in August 2021, and is used to increase capacity on busy weekends.

In 2021, No. 29, along with cars 101–103, were trucked out to Pawhuska, Oklahoma, to appear in the Martin Scorsese film, Killers of the Flower Moon. For the film, the Pullmans were repainted in Pullman green, while No. 29 was repainted as Atchison, Topeka and Santa Fe Railway No. 729 (the real 729 was also a 2-8-0 Consolidation, and several of its classmates are preserved). No. 29 is the latest in a long line of V&T locomotives to appear in films, as equipment from the original V&T frequently appeared in westerns by Desilu Productions. As of October 2023, the Pullmans are still wearing their movie colors, while No. 29 was quickly given its old identity back upon its return.

In February 2022, the V&T acquired three pieces of equipment from the Fillmore and Western Railway in Ventura County, California. These were an ex-CB&Q Pullman numbered 2205 and named Rancho Camulos, an ex-SP ALCO S-6 numbered 1059, and the body of a Pacific Fruit Express reefer. 1059, which famously appeared in Back to the Future Part III as the lead locomotive of the train that destroys the DeLorean time machine, was acquired as a replacement for D-2.

In May 2022, the railroad acquired a Baldwin 2-8-2 from the Oregon Coast Scenic Railroad. The locomotive, No. 100, was built for the Charles R. McCormick Lumber Company in 1926, and ran on the Heber Valley Railroad from 1976 to 1989. The locomotive is currently at the Virginia City shops undergoing restoration work. It has been reassigned the number 30 from SP 1251.

== Current equipment ==
=== Locomotives ===
Locomotive details
Number	Image	Type	Model	Built	Builder	Acquired	Status	Heritage
11		Steam	4-4-0	1872	Baldwin Locomotive Works	1872 (original); 2021 (preserved)	Under restoration	Virginia & Truckee Railroad
18		Steam	2-8-2	1914	Baldwin Locomotive Works	2005	Operational	McCloud Railway
29		Steam	2-8-0	1916	Baldwin Locomotive Works	1977	Undergoing 1,472-day inspection and overhaul	Longview, Portland and Northern Railway
100		Steam	2-8-2	1919	Baldwin Locomotive Works	2022	Under restoration	Santa Maria Valley Railroad
1251		Steam	0-6-0	1919	SP Sacramento Shops	1984	Inoperable, disassembled	Southern Pacific Railroad
D-1		Diesel	80-ton switcher	1953	General Electric	2002	Operational	Western Pacific Railroad Museum
D-2		Diesel	S-4	1951	American Locomotive Company	2009	Operational	Montour Railroad
D-3		Diesel	44-ton switcher	1943	General Electric	2013	Operational	United States Marine Corps
D-4		Diesel	SW1200	1957	Electro-Motive Diesel	2016	Operational	Northern Pacific Railway
D-5		Diesel	S-6	1956	General Electric	2022	Operational	Southern Pacific Railroad
M-1		Gasoline	Motorcar	1926	Edwards Rail Car Company	2011n	Stored, inoperable	Chicago, Burlington and Quincy Railroad

=== Rolling stock ===
Rolling stock details
Number	Image	Type	Built	Builder	Acquired	Heratige
25 (1st)		Caboose	1888	Unknown	1976	San Francisco and North Pacific Railroad
25 (2nd)		Caboose	Unknown	Unknown	2000s	Northern Pacific Railway
50		Caboose	1916	Unknown	1977	Western Pacific Railroad
52		Caboose	1979	Unknown	2020	Union Pacific Railroad
54		Boxcar	Unknown	Unknown	1977	Western Pacific Railroad
55		Open-air car	1916	Unknown	1977	Western Pacific Railroad
100		Parlor car	1907	American Car and Foundry Company	1990s	Bangor & Aroostook Railroad
101		Coach	1914	Pullman Company	2008	Delaware, Lackawanna and Western Railroad
102		Coach	1914	Pullman Company	2009	Delaware, Lackawanna and Western Railroad
103		Business car	1917	Pullman Company	2010	Yuma Valley Railway
104		Coach	1909	Pullman Company	2010	Southern Pacific Railroad
105		Coach	1920/1922	Pullman Company	2022	Fillmore and Western Railway

=== Former units ===
Locomotive details
Number	Image	Type	Model	Built	Builder	Status	Heritage	Owner
8		Steam	2-6-2	1907	Baldwin Locomotive Works	Stored, serviceable	Feather River Short Line; Hobart Southern	Gold Hill Historical Society
3		Diesel	44-ton switcher	1945	General Electric	Leased in 2002, returned at end of season	Quincy Railroad	Western Pacific Railroad Museum

=== Former rolling stock ===
Rolling stock details
Number	Type	Built	Builder	Heratige
51	Caboose	Unknown	Unknown	Sacramento Northern Railway

== In popular culture ==
In order to ascend the mountain to Virginia City it was necessary to build an enormous trestle. Popular Nevada mythology says Crown Point Trestle was considered to be such a feat of engineering that it is featured on the Seal of Nevada. This myth is mentioned by Lucius Beebe. Former Nevada State Archivist Guy Rocha debunks this myth on the state's Myth-a-Month page, pointing out that the state seal predates the trestle and shows a viaduct, not a trestle.

== See also ==
- List of heritage railways
  - List of heritage railroads in the United States
