= Lucius Beebe =

American historian (1902–1966)

Lucius Morris Beebe
- Beebe (at right) with Charles Clegg in their office while publishing the Territorial Enterprise newspaper in Virginia City, Nevada
- Born: December 9, 1902; Wakefield, Massachusetts, U.S.
- Died: February 4, 1966 (aged 63); San Francisco, California, U.S.
- Education: Yale University (expelled); Harvard University (BA)
- Occupations: Author, journalist, columnist, photographer, gourmand
- Employer(s): New York Herald Tribune; San Francisco Examiner; Boston Telegram; Boston Evening Transcript; Territorial Enterprise; Gourmet; The New Yorker; Playboy
- Known for: Railroad history and documenting café society
- Partner(s): Jerome Zerbe; Charles Clegg

Lucius Morris Beebe (December 9, 1902 – February 4, 1966) was an American writer, gourmand, photographer, railroad historian, journalist, and syndicated columnist.

== Early life and education ==
Beebe was born in Wakefield, Massachusetts, to a prominent Boston family. He attended both Harvard University and Yale University, where he contributed to the campus newspaper, Harvard Crimson, and the humor magazine, The Yale Record. During his tenures at boarding school and university, Beebe was known for his numerous pranks. One of his more outrageous stunts included an attempt at festooning J. P. Morgan's yacht Corsair III with toilet paper from a chartered airplane. His pranks were not without consequence, and he proudly noted that he had the sole distinction of having been expelled from both Harvard and Yale, at the insistence, respectively, of the president and dean. Beebe earned his undergraduate degree from Harvard in 1926, only to be expelled during graduate school.

== Journalist ==
During and immediately after obtaining his degree from Harvard, Beebe published several books of poetry, but eventually found his true calling in journalism. He worked as a journalist for the New York Herald Tribune, the San Francisco Examiner, the Boston Telegram, and the Boston Evening Transcript, and was a contributing writer to many magazines such as Gourmet, The New Yorker, Town and Country, Holiday, American Heritage, and Playboy. Beebe re-launched Nevada's first newspaper, the Territorial Enterprise, in 1952.

He wrote a syndicated column for the New York Herald Tribune, from the 1930s through 1944, called This New York. The column chronicled the doings of fashionable society at such storied restaurants and nightclubs as El Morocco, the 21 Club, the Stork Club, and The Colony. Beebe is credited with popularizing the term "cafe society", which was used to describe the people mentioned in his column.

In 1950, Beebe and his long-time romantic partner, photographer Charles Clegg, moved to Virginia City, Nevada, where they purchased and restored the Piper family home and later purchased the dormant Territorial Enterprise newspaper. The newspaper was relaunched in 1952, and by 1954 had achieved the highest circulation in the West for a weekly newspaper. Beebe and Clegg co-wrote the That Was the West series of historical essays for the newspaper.

In 1960, Beebe began work with the San Francisco Chronicle, where he wrote a syndicated column, This Wild West. During the six years that he wrote the column, Beebe covered such topics as economics, politics, journalism, religion, history, morals, justice, finance, and travel.

== Gourmand ==
Beebe was a noted gourmand. He had his own column, Along the Boulevards, in Gourmet, and wrote extensively for Holiday and Playboy about restaurants and dining experiences around the world. Some of the restaurants he covered include The Colony, The Stork Club, The Pump Room, the 21 Club, Simpson's-in-the-Strand, and Chasen's. Also a wine aficionado, he was a member of the Confrérie des Chevaliers du Tastevin.

== Author ==
In addition to his work as a journalist, Beebe wrote over 35 books. These dealt primarily with railroading and café society. He was the first writer to use a painting by Howard L. Fogg, noted railroad artist, on the cover of a book. Many of his railroad books were written with his longtime companion Charles Clegg.

Beebe was inducted into the Nevada Writers Hall of Fame in 1992.

== Railroad history ==
Beebe wrote extensively about the joys of train travel, including such nostalgic books describing quaint short line railroads as Mixed Train Daily (1947) and Narrow Gauge in the Rockies (1958). During the filming of Union Pacific with V&T 11 in 1938, Beebe was reportedly on set as an advisor during shooting near Iron Springs, Utah. In September, 1947, he arranged an excursion on the Maryland and Pennsylvania Railroad covered by a photo spread in Life. Beebe and Clegg were attired in formal wear and top hats, as waiters served champagne and caviar to their guests riding in an open car behind an ancient steam locomotive. Beebe's book The Trains We Rode (1965) used more than 1,500 photos and illustrations to chronicle the passing era of famous named passenger trains and streamliners, along with the stations they served. For example, he proclaimed Baltimore's Mount Royal Station, built in the early 1890s, as "one of the celebrated railroad stations of the world, ranking in renown with Euston Station, London, scene of so many of Sherlock Holmes' departures, the Gare du Nord in Paris, and the feudal fortress of the Pennsylvania Railroad at Broad Street, Philadelphia."

Along with Clegg, Beebe owned two private railcars, the Gold Coast and The Virginia City. The Gold Coast, Georgia Northern / Central of Georgia No. 100, was built in 1905 and is now at the California State Railroad Museum. After Beebe and Clegg purchased The Virginia City, they had it refurbished and redecorated by famed Hollywood set designer Robert T. Hanley in a style known as Venetian Renaissance Baroque. The Virginia City has been restored and can be chartered and attached to Amtrak trains in the United States, although newly restrictive Amtrak policies make private car moves on scheduled passenger trains difficult to arrange. Beebe and Clegg wrote about and photographed the Virginia & Truckee Railroad and worked unsuccessfully with other railroad fans to preserve it. Their fame was such that they were caricatured in Fiddletown & Copperopolis, by Carl Fallberg.

== Ship travel ==
Beebe was a noted partisan of the Cunard Line and passenger liner travel in general. He wrote several articles about trans-Atlantic passage on Cunard ships during the "Golden Era" of the 1920s, 30s and 40s.

== Sartorial splendor ==
A noted boulevardier, Beebe had an impressive and baroque wardrobe. Beebe's clothing included 40 suits, at least two mink-lined overcoats, numerous top hats and bowlers, a collection of doeskin gloves, walking sticks and a substantial gold nugget watch chain. Columnist Walter Winchell referred to Beebe and his wardrobe as "Luscious Lucius". Beebe's sartorial splendor was recognized when he appeared in full formal day attire on the cover of Life over the title of "Lucius Beebe Sets a Style".

Many of Beebe's articles and columns addressed men's traditional fashion. He was especially fond of English bespoke tailoring and shoes and wrote glowing articles about noted court tailor Henry Poole & Company and noted bootmaker John Lobb, whom he patronized on a regular basis. He also liked ties, particularly from Charvet in Paris, men's hats and wrote of the history of the bowler hat.

== Personal life ==
In 1940, Beebe met Charles Clegg while both were houseguests at the Washington, D.C., home of Evalyn Walsh McLean. The two soon developed a personal and professional relationship that continued for the rest of Beebe's life. Previously, Beebe had been involved with society photographer Jerome Zerbe.

The pair initially lived in New York City, where both men were prominent in café society circles. During the lavender panic, the two moved in 1950 to Virginia City, Nevada, a tiny community that had once been a fabled mining boomtown. There, they reactivated and began publishing the Territorial Enterprise, a fabled 19th-century newspaper that had once been the employer of Mark Twain. Beebe and Clegg shared a renovated mansion in the town, traveled extensively, and remained prominent in social circles.

Beebe was a community activist while living in Nevada. He was appointed by Nevada's governor to be a member of the Nevada State Centennial Committee (1958) and was Chairman of the Silver Centennial Monument Committee, groups that planned events honoring Nevada's and Virginia City's history. Through their efforts, the federal government commissioned a commemorative stamp in recognition of the discovery of the Comstock Lode in the Virginia City region.

Clegg and Beebe sold the Territorial Enterprise in 1961 and purchased a home in suburban San Francisco. They continued the writing, photography, and travel that had marked their lives until Beebe's death. Beebe died at the age of 63 of a sudden heart attack at his winter home in Hillsborough, California, (near San Francisco) on Friday, February 4, 1966. A memorial service was held three days later, on Monday, February 7, at 11:00 a.m. at Emmanuel Church on Newbury Street in Boston. His ashes, reportedly along with those of two of his dogs, were returned to Massachusetts and are buried in Lakeside Cemetery on North Avenue in his hometown of Wakefield, in one of the Beebe family plots, at the extreme north end of the cemetery.

Clegg died by suicide in 1979, at the same age that Beebe had reached when he died.

== Legacy and criticism ==
Lucius Beebe & Charles Clegg's railroad books have come under scrutiny for their prose and reliance on anecdotal history both from contemporaries and historians since their deaths. A 1947 review of Mixed Train Daily praised the book for its broad scope and striking photography but criticized the text for its "pompous" tone, authorial biases and dubious claims. Railway & Locomotive Historical Society (RLHS) founder Charles Fisher was an outspoken critic of Beebe's writing and compiled several lists of factual errors he found in it. Beebe in an interview with Railroad Magazine responded to the criticism by saying "Neither Clegg nor I have ever been a member of the tractive-force and cylinder-dimension contingent of railfans. We prefer the beauty and romantic aspects of railroading"

A November 1951 article written by Beebe in Trains Magazine focusing railroads in Utah's Little Cottonwood Canyon received several letters to the editor throughout 1952 from local railfans noting the errors in Beebe's text, particularly complaining that Beebe claimed the railroad was "nameless" when it was historically known to have been part of the Wasatch & Jordan Valley Railroad. Beebe also claimed the upper portions of the Little Cottonwood Canyon line were inoperable under steam power and could only operate as a gravity tramway with uphill loads hauled by mules, which was only partially correct as the line was rebuilt in later years to allow steam use.

Historian Carl W. Condit writing for the RLHS' Railroad History in 1980 critiqued Beebe & Clegg and their imitators for their lack of editorial oversight, while exploring the unique relationship between historiography and the railfan community. Condit was particularly critical of Beebe & Clegg's lack of technical knowledge of railroading and various factual errors perpetuated in Beebe & Clegg's text. Condit did positively note however Beebe's influence in opening the market for future rail history authors. In a positive retrospective, Kevin P. Keefe a columnist for Classic Trains Magazine noted the availability of Beebe's writing in the form of coffee table books allowed wider recognition of rail history subjects to casual enthusiasts. Trains Magazine columnist Fred Frailey in a positive review described Beebe's text with "You either love it or hate it, and I wouldn’t have him any other way."

Outside of railroad books, Lucius Beebe received criticism from Boston, Massachusetts locals for his claims in the 1935 Boston and the Boston Legend with local Bostonians having made parlor games out of noting errors in the text; although the book was also praised for capturing the spirit of the city and its culture.

Modern critique on the photography of Beebe & Clegg is generally positive. The Center for Railroad Photography & Art notes their books as bringing the subject of rail photography to a wide audience, describing Beebe & Clegg's photography as depicting railroads as "heroic". Beebe & Clegg's work is positively noted by critics for its photography of various shortline railroads. A negative criticism of Beebe & Clegg's photography has noted their use of analog photograph manipulation and misattribution of sources when using other people's photographs. Modern retrospectives have also studied the relationship between Beebe & Clegg and their status as gay celebrities. Beebe & Clegg's collections and their private railcar "Gold Coast" are preserved at the California State Railroad Museum.

== Bibliography ==
- Beebe, Lucius (1921). Fallen Stars. Boston: Cornhill Publishing.
- Beebe, Lucius (1924). Corydon and Other Poems. Boston: B.J. Brimmer.
- Beebe, Lucius (1928). Aspects of the Poetry of Edwin Arlington Robinson. Cambridge, MA: privately published.
- Beebe, Lucius (1932). The Awful Seeley Dinner. New York: F.R. Publishing.
- Beebe, Lucius (1935). Boston and the Boston Legend. New York: D. Appleton-Century Company.
- Beebe, Lucius (1936). The Ritz Idea: The Story of a Great Hotel. New York: privately published.
- Beebe, Lucius (1938). High Iron: A Book of Trains. New York: D. Appleton-Century Company.
- Beebe, Lucius (1940). Highliners: A Railroad Album. New York: D. Appleton-Century Company.
- Beebe, Lucius (1941). Trains in Transition. New York: D. Appleton-Century Company.
- Beebe, Lucius (1943). Snoot if You Must. New York: D. Appleton-Century Company.
- Beebe, Lucius (1945). Highball: A Railroad Pageant. New York: D. Appleton-Century Company.
- Beebe, Lucius (1947). Mixed Train Daily: A Book of Short-line Railroads. New York: E. P. Dutton & Co.
- Beebe, Lucius (1947). The Plaza: Fortieth Anniversary, 1907–1947. New York: Hilton Hotels.
- Beebe, Lucius (1946). The Stork Club Bar Book. New York: Rinehart.
- Beebe, Lucius; Charles Clegg (1949). U.S. West: The Saga of Wells Fargo. New York: E.P. Dutton.
- Beebe, Lucius; Charles Clegg (1949). Virginia & Truckee, a Story of Virginia City and Comstock Times. Oakland, CA: Grahame H. Hardy.
- Beebe, Lucius; Charles Clegg (1950). Legends of the Comstock Lode. Oakland, CA: Grahame H. Hardy.
- Beebe, Lucius; Charles Clegg (1951). Cable Car Carnival. Oakland, CA: Grahame H. Hardy.
- Beebe, Lucius; Charles Clegg (1952). Hear the Train Blow: A Pictorial Epic of America in the Railroad Age. New York: Dutton.
- Beebe, Lucius (1954). Comstock Commotion: The Story of the Territorial Enterprise and Virginia City News. Stanford, CA: Stanford University Press.
- Beebe, Lucius; Charles Clegg (1955). The American West: The Pictorial Epic of a Continent. New York: E. P. Dutton and Company, Inc.
- Beebe, Lucius; Charles Clegg (1957). The Age of Steam: A Classic Album of American Railroading. New York: Rinehart and Company.
- Beebe, Lucius; Charles Clegg (1957). Steamcars to the Comstock. Berkeley, CA: Howell-North.
- Beebe, Lucius; Charles Clegg (1958). Narrow Gauge in the Rockies. Berkeley, CA: Howell-North.
- Beebe, Lucius (1959). Mansions on Rails: The Folklore of the Private Railway Car. Berkeley, California: Howell-North.
- Beebe, Lucius (1961). Mr. Pullman's Elegant Palace Car, the Railway Carriage that Established a New Dimension of Luxury and Entered the National Lexicon as a Symbol of Splendor. New York: Doubleday & Company.
- Beebe, Lucius; Charles Clegg (1960). San Francisco's Golden Era, a Picture Story of San Francisco Before the Fire. Berkeley, CA: Howell-North.
- Beebe, Lucius (1962). 20th Century: "The Greatest Train in the World". Berkeley, CA: Howell-North.
- Beebe, Lucius; Charles Clegg (1962). Rio Grande, Mainline of the Rockies. Berkeley, CA: Howell-North.
- Beebe, Lucius; Charles Clegg (1962). When Beauty Rode the Rails, an Album of Railroad Yesterdays. Garden City, NY: Doubleday.
- Beebe, Lucius (1963). The Overland Limited. Berkeley, CA: Howell-North Books.
- Beebe, Lucius (1963). The Central Pacific & Southern Pacific Railroads. Berkeley, CA: Howell-North.
- Beebe, Lucius; Charles Clegg (1964). Great Railroad Photographs, U.S.A. Berkeley, CA: Howell-North.
- Beebe, Lucius (1965). Two Trains to Remember: The New England Limited, The Air Line Limited. Virginia City, NV: privately published.
- Beebe, Lucius; Charles Clegg (1965). The Trains We Rode. Vol. I: Alton–New York Central. Berkeley, CA: Howell-North.
- Beebe, Lucius; Charles Clegg (1966). The Trains We Rode. Vol. II: Northern Pacific–Wabash. Berkeley, CA: Howell-North.
- Beebe, Lucius (1966). The Big Spenders. New York: Doubleday & Company.
- Beebe, Lucius (1966). Scott Newhall (ed.). The Provocative Pen of Lucius Beebe, Esq. San Francisco: Chronicle Publishing Company.
- Beebe, Lucius (1967). Clegg, Charles; Emrich, Duncan (eds.). The Lucius Beebe Reader. Garden City, N.Y.: Doubleday & Company. LCCN 67-90214. OCLC 1036554388.
