= Yuma Valley Railway =

Former heritage railroad in Arizona

Overview
- Headquarters: Yuma, Arizona
- Locale: Yuma County, Arizona, USA
- Dates of operation: 1914 (predecessor)–2005

Technical
- Track gauge: 4 ft 8 1/2 in (1,435 mm) standard gauge

The Yuma Valley Railway was a heritage railroad in Arizona, which formerly operated an excursion passenger train on the rail line following the Colorado River levee between Yuma and Gadsden. The railroad's train has not operated since 2005, when the line was embargoed by the Bureau of Reclamation. The equipment had been parked idle across the canal and south of the Yuma Quartermaster Depot; at least one passenger car was relocated to the Virginia and Truckee Railroad in May 2013.

== Motive Power and Rolling Stock ==
- 1943 USMC GE 44-ton switcher Center Cab Diesel
- 1957 GE 65-ton switcher Center Cab Diesel
- 1952 U.S. Army Davenport-Besler
- 1922 Pullman chair car (Apache Railway)
- 1923 Pullman club car/U.S. Army ambulance car
- 1950 Pullman chair car

== History ==
The YVRY was originally owned by the U.S. Department of the Interior's Bureau of Reclamation. It was part of the Interior Department's irrigation and flood control project along the levee of the Colorado River.

The U.S. Government's railroad was known as the Yuma Valley Railroad and operated from 1914 and into the 1980s. The Yuma Valley Railroad originally extended 25 miles from Yuma to the Arizona/Mexico border town of San Luis. In 1947 the Yuma Valley Railroad was leased to and operated by the Southern Pacific Railroad, at which time the 9 miles from Gadsden to San Luis were idle and later abandoned.

The Colorado River Levee Linear Park runs along the levee and the path of part of the railroad in Yuma.
