= Carson City station =

Railroad station in Carson City, Nevada, US

Carson City
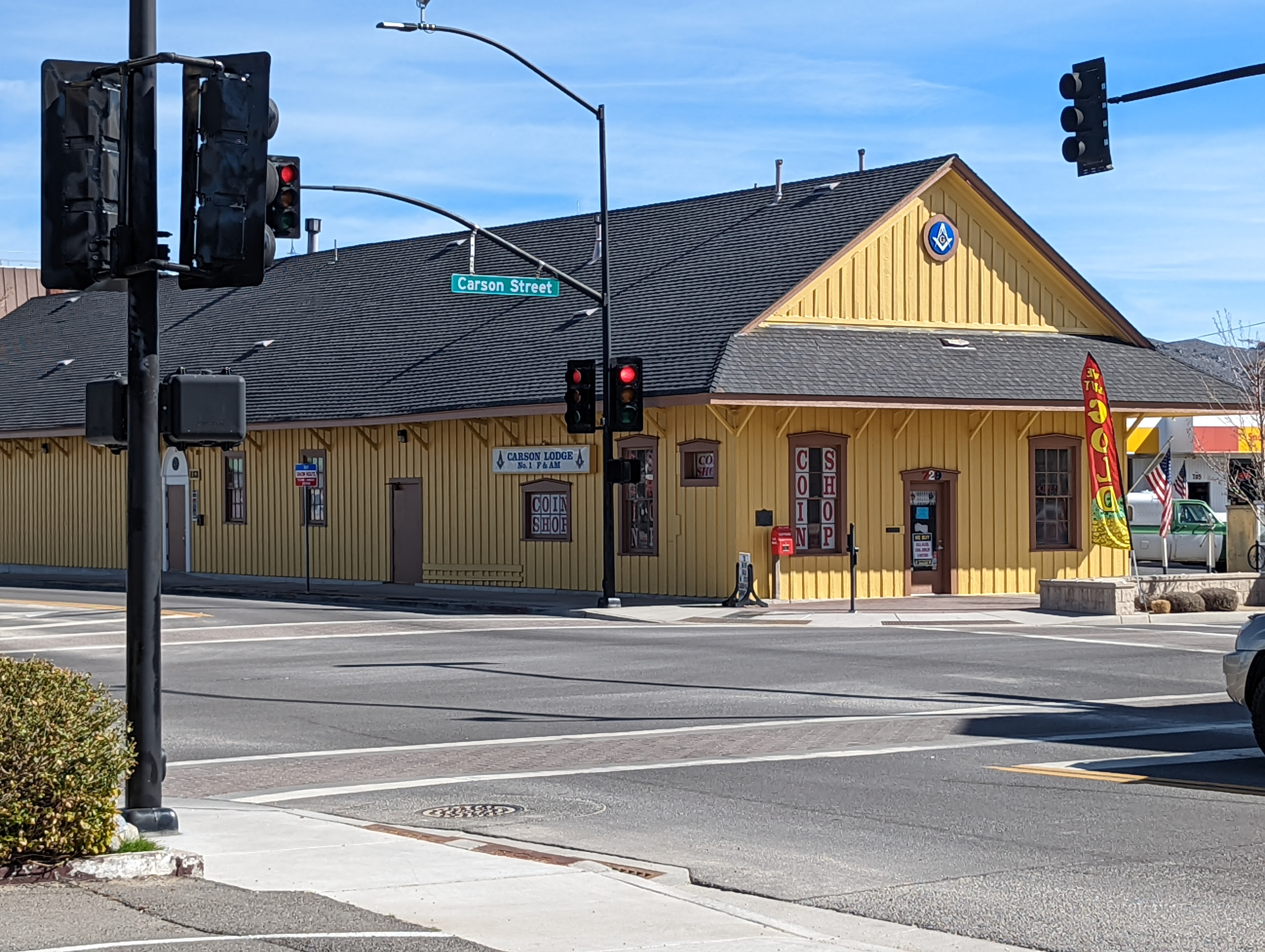
- The V&T Depot in Carson City

General information
- Location: 729 North Carson Street; Carson City, Nevada
- Platforms: 1 side platform
- Tracks: 2

History
- Opened: 1872

Former services
Preceding station	Virginia and Truckee Railroad	Following station
Sand Cut toward Reno	Main Line	Lookout toward Virginia City
- Virginia and Truckee Railroad Depot - Carson City
- U.S. National Register of Historic Places
- Coordinates: 39.1683°N 119.7666°W
- Area: less than one acre
- Built: 1872
- Built by: Virginia and Truckee Railroad Company
- Architectural style: Pattern book rail depot
- NRHP reference No.: 98001208
- Added to NRHP: September 30, 1998
Location

The Virginia & Truckee (V&T) Railroad Depot of Carson City, Nevada, is a historic railroad station that is listed on the U.S. National Register of Historic Places (NRHP). It is significant for its association with the economically important role of the V&T railroad historically in Carson City following discovery of the Comstock Lode mine in 1859. To a lesser degree, according to its NRHP nomination, the depot building is also significant architecturally "as a well-preserved example of a wood-frame passenger depot procured from a railroad company pattern book within the V&T's former sphere of operation."

Located on the Southeast corner of the Washington Street intersection with Carson Street, it served the Virginia and Truckee Railroad until 1950, when the railroad shut down.

It was listed on the National Register of Historic Places in 1998.

The Reno, Gold Hill, and original Virginia City Depots still exist, as well as the V&T Freight Depot in Virginia City.

== History ==
The V&T was created in 1869, and originally ran between Virginia City and Carson City by way of Mound House. It was created to allow massive movement of gold and silver ore from the Comstock Lode to mills along the Carson River. The tracks ran east–west down Washington Street. The V&T's yards and Engine House were located just east of the depot along Washington Street. There were no guardrails shielding Carson Street. In 1906, the V&T expanded the route south from the Carson City depot to Minden to serve agricultural interests at the farms and ranches in the area. The V&T became quite profitable until the 1920s, when they saw their first shortfall. In 1938, with the mining all but nonexistent, and competition from the newly created United States Highway System, the V&T had to tear up the track from Virginia City to Mound House, which still had a connection with the Carson and Colorado Railroad. The V&T was still leaking money up until her final year in 1950, when Locomotive #27 Ran the final train from Minden, through Carson City, and into Reno.
