= Jack Otterson =

American art director

- Born: August 25, 1905; Pittsburgh, Pennsylvania, US
- Died: December 22, 1991 (aged 86); Los Angeles, California, US
- Occupation: Art director
- Years active: 1934-1953

John (Jack) Edward Otterson (August 25, 1905 – December 22, 1991) was an American art director. He was nominated for eight Academy Awards in the category Best Art Direction. He worked on 300 films between the years of 1934 and 1953.

== Biography ==
Otterson was born in Pittsburgh, Pennsylvania on August 25, 1905. He was educated at Yale, where he was an editor of a campus humor magazine The Yale Record with writer Geoffrey T. Hellman, writer and film critic Dwight Macdonald and Hollywood photographer Jerome Zerbe.

== Death ==
Otterson died in Los Angeles, California on December 22, 1991.

== Awards ==
Otterson was nominated for eight Academy Awards for Best Art Direction:

- The Magnificent Brute (1936)
- You're a Sweetheart (1937)
- Mad About Music (1938)
- First Love (1939)
- The Boys from Syracuse (1940)
- The Flame of New Orleans (1941)
- Arabian Nights (1942)
- The Spoilers (1942)

== Selected filmography ==
- The Missing Guest (1938)
- Son of Frankenstein (1939)
- Tower of London (1939)
- The Invisible Man Returns (1940)
- The House of the Seven Gables (1940)
- The Wolf Man (1941)
- The Ghost of Frankenstein (1942)
- The Spoilers (1942)
- Arabian Nights (1942)
