= H. W. Griffiths =

American photographer

Henry W. Griffiths Jr. (1916 – 1997) was a prominent Idaho railroad photographer who traveled throughout Idaho, Montana, Washington, Utah and other Northwest states.

== Background ==
Born and raised in Boise, Idaho, Griffiths inherited his fondness of railroading from his uncle Fred Luff, a pensioned brakeman. In the 1930s, Griffiths began to record the railroad industry through black-and-white photography. His work has been published in Trains, other magazines and many books. He was one of only a few railroad photographers that shot in Idaho and many of his photographs are the only record of that time and place. He also was one of the few known cinematographers in the region to ever film steam locomotives at work.

His photograph "Union Pacific Challenger #3712 pushes train out of Ogden, Utah, 1956" was included in the Center for Railroad Photography and Art 20 Memorable Railroad Photographs of the 20th Century.
