= Virginia and Truckee Railway Locomotive No. 27 =

Virginia and Truckee 27
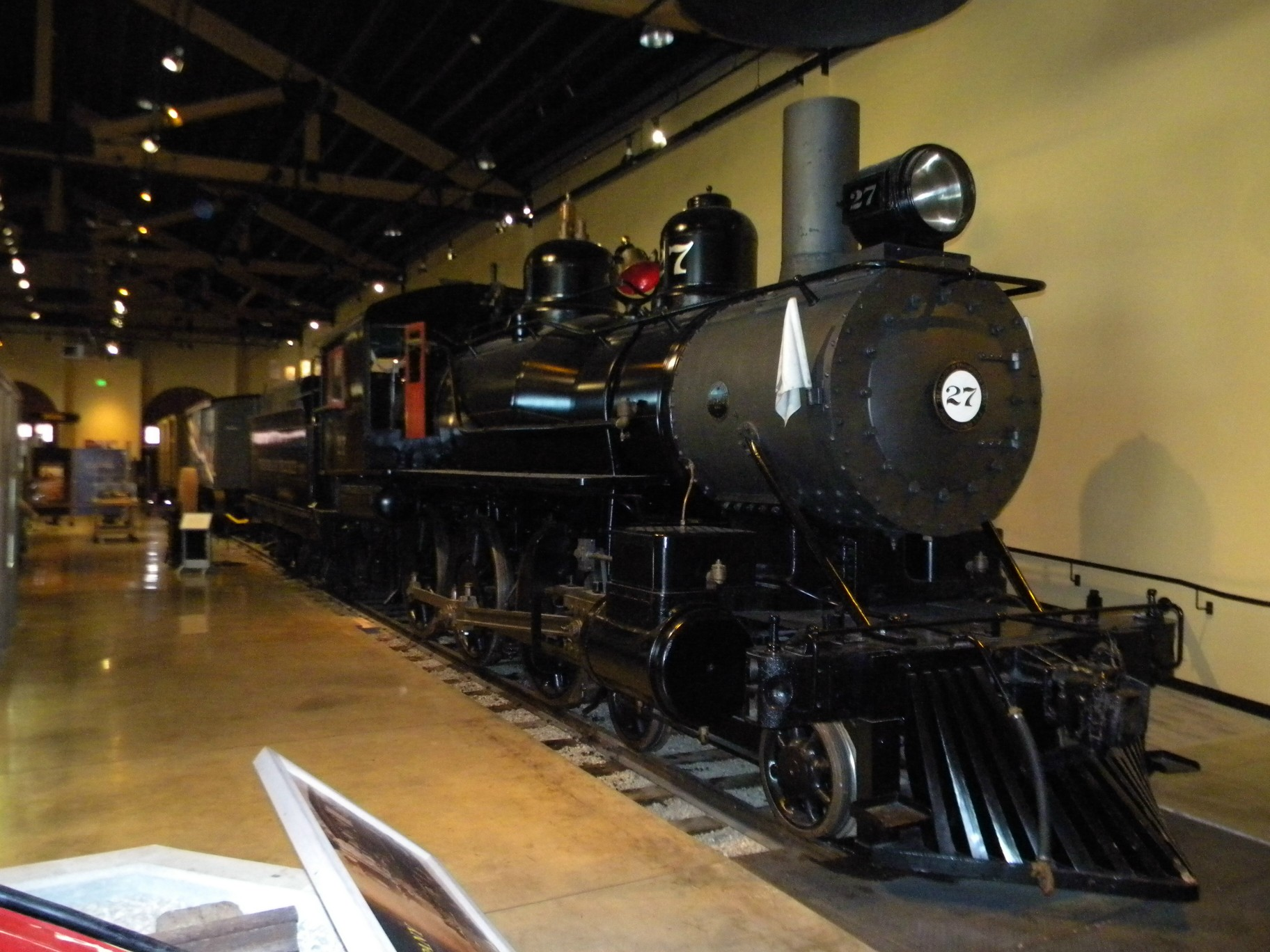
Type and origin
- Power type: Steam
- Builder: Baldwin Locomotive Works
- Serial number: 39453
- Build date: March 1913
Specifications
- Configuration
  - Whyte: 4-6-0
- Gauge: 4 ft 8 1/2 in (1,435 mm)
- Driver dia.: 56 in (1 m)
- Adhesive weight: 100,000 lb (45 t)
- Loco weight: 121,000 lb (55 t)
- Fuel type: Oil
- Boiler pressure: 190 psi (1,310 kPa)
- Cylinders: Two, outside
- Cylinder size: 18 in × 24 in (0.46 m × 0.61 m)
- Valve gear: Stephenson
- Loco brake: Air
- Train brakes: Air
Performance figures
- Tractive effort: 22,400 lbf (100 kN)
Career
- Operators: Virginia and Truckee Railroad
- Numbers: V&T 27
- Delivered: March 14, 1913
- Last run: May 31, 1950
- Retired: 1948
- Current owner: Comstock History Center
- Disposition: On static display
- Virginia and Truckee Railway Engine #27
- U.S. National Register of Historic Places
- Location within Nevada
- Location: Carson City, Nevada
- Coordinates: 39°9′0″N 119°46′2″W
- Area: Transportation
- Built: 1913
- NRHP reference No.: 04001198
- Added to NRHP: October 27, 2004

Virginia and Truckee Railroad 27 is a 4-6-0 "Ten-Wheeler" type steam locomotive. It was on display at the Nevada State Railroad Museum in Carson City, Nevada, but was traded with The Dayton and is currently on display at the Comstock History Center in Virginia City. It was the last locomotive acquired new by the Virginia and Truckee Railroad, and pulled the last commercial train for the V&T on May 31, 1950, the date that freight and passenger services officially terminated for the company. The locomotive was placed on the National Register of Historic Places due to its association with the Virginia and Truckee Railroad and transportation development in Nevada.

== History ==
Locomotive #27, also known as Baldwin Locomotive Works #39453, was built in 1913 by Baldwin. It weighs 121,000 pounds, 100,000 of this is weight on the driving wheels. Its 56-inch drivers provide 22,400 pounds of tractive effort.

A 4-6-0 “ten wheeler”, it was the last locomotive delivered new to the Virginia and Truckee Railroad (V&T), and the third ten-wheeler delivered, behind its twin #26 in 1907, and the so-called "Second #25" in 1905. #27 served the V&T dependably and without incident throughout its operational life.

== Retirement ==
In 1948, #27's boiler permit expired, and the locomotive was retired by the Interstate Commerce Commission (ICC), leaving only #26 and a giant Alco 75-ton 2-8-0 known as the "Second #5" (due to its numbering with its previous owner) in service with the bankrupt V&T Railroad. In 1949, #27 was granted a one-day operating permit to serve as a special train for the California-Nevada Railroad Historical Society, before being put back into its engine house to resume retirement.

The year 1950, saw the V&T approaching abandonment as an operating railroad. #26 was the workhorse of the railroad by this time, with Second-5 seldom being used due to its much greater weight causing damage to the rails and ties. #26 was intended to run the last revenue routes for the V&T when, on May 2, 1950, it was destroyed by a fire in its engine house. The V&T executives requested special authority from the ICC to bring #27 back into service for the remaining weeks of V&T operations. This request was granted and, on May 31, 1950, locomotive #27 pulled the last revenue train from Minden to Reno.

== After V&T ==
Following the V&T ceasing passenger and freight operations on that date, #27 was used to pull the remainder of the railroad's own equipment into Carson City on June 1, as well as some ancillary clean-up duties until June 3. That summer it was used in the 1951 serial movie Roar of the Iron Horse before the Purdy Company, which now owned #27, scrapped the remainder of the V&T railroad.

The Purdy Company presented the locomotive to the governor of Nevada with the intent that it be preserved. It was displayed near Carson City starting in 1955, where it stayed until 1963, when it was moved to the airport for display. It was later moved to Mound House in 1971 with some other V&T equipment. #27 was moved to Virginia City later in 1971 at the former site of the passenger depot. It remained there until at least 1993 when it was moved to Gold Hill, before finally being housed in the Nevada State Railroad Museum. In 2018, #27 traded places with Virginia and Truckee 18 Dayton, being moved to the Comstock History Center, which coincidentally is built in the same parking lot that it was stored from the 70's until the 90's.
