= Café society =

People who gathered in cafes and restaurants

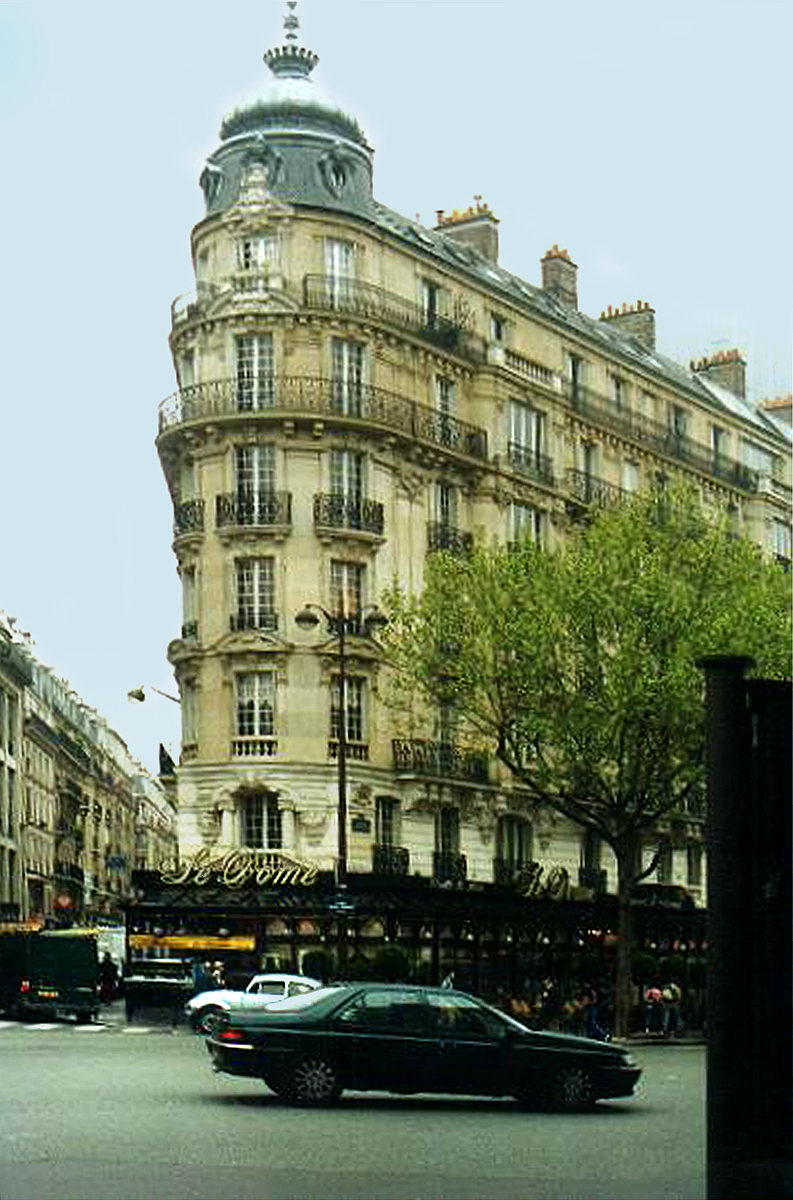
Le Dôme Café in Paris, frequented by School of Paris artists during the 1920s and 1930s.

Café society was the description of the "Beautiful People" and "Bright Young Things" who gathered in fashionable cafés and restaurants in New York City, Paris and London beginning in the late 19th century. Maury Henry Biddle Paul is credited with coining the phrase "café society" in 1915. The term has also been used to describe the bohemian ensemble of artists and intellectuals in interwar Paris.

Members attended each other's private dinners and balls, and took holidays in exotic locations or at elegant resorts. In the United States, café society came to the fore with the end of Prohibition in December 1933, and the rise of photojournalism to describe the set of people who tended to do their entertaining semi-publicly—in restaurants and nightclubs—and who would include among them movie stars and sports celebrities. Some of the American nightclubs and New York City restaurants frequented by the denizens of café society included the 21 Club, El Morocco, Restaurant Larue, and the Stork Club.

== Interwar Paris ==
Between the first and second world wars, artists, writers and intellectuals flocked to Paris where they would visit cafes and bistros. Among the writers were Americans authors Ernest Hemingway, F. Scott Fitzgerald. Artists of the Ecole de Paris such as Chaim Soutine, Yitzhak Frenkel, Jules Pascin and others would also frequent cafes with different groups of artists frequenting different cafes. Cafes from the period include Le Dôme Café, Café de la Rotonde, Le Select and others.

== See also ==
- 1920s Berlin
- Années folles
- Golden Twenties
- Jazz Age
- Paris between the Wars (1918–1939)
- Roaring Twenties
- Jet set

== Bibliography ==
- Beebe, Lucius (1967). Clegg, Charles; Emrich, Duncan (eds.). The Lucius Beebe Reader. Garden City, N.Y.: Doubleday & Company. ISBN 9780090960507. OCLC 720851.
- Blumenthal, Ralph (2000). Stork Club: America's Most Famous Nightspot and the Lost World of Café Society. Boston: Little, Brown & Co. ISBN 0-316-10531-7. OCLC 42072089.
- Bradshaw, Steve (1978). Café Society: Bohemian Life from Swift to Bob Dylan. London: Weidenfeld & Nicolson. ISBN 978-0-297-77428-0.
- Young, Anthony (28 May 2015). New York Café Society: The Elite Meet to See and Be Seen, 1920s–1940s. McFarland. ISBN 978-1-4766-1906-4. OCLC 931884327.
