= Charles Clegg =

American photographer and historian (1916–1979)

- Born: June 29, 1916; Youngstown, Ohio, U.S.
- Died: August 25, 1979 (aged 63)

Charles Myron Clegg Jr. (June 29, 1916 – August 25, 1979) was an American author, photographer, and railroad historian. Clegg is primarily remembered as the lifelong romantic partner of famed railroad author Lucius Beebe, and was a co-author of many of Beebe's best-known books.

Born into an old New England family, Clegg grew up in Rhode Island, and during his early years developed strong interests in railroads, electronics, and photography. In 1940, Clegg met Beebe while both were house guests at the Washington, D.C. home of Evalyn Walsh McLean. The two soon became inseparable, developing a personal and professional relationship that continued for the rest of Beebe's life.

The pair initially lived in New York City, where Beebe was a columnist for the New York Herald Tribune and both men were prominent in café society circles. During the lavender panic, the two moved in 1950 to Virginia City, Nevada, a tiny community that had once been a fabled mining boomtown. There, they reactivated and began publishing the Territorial Enterprise, a fabled 19th-century newspaper that had once been the employer of Mark Twain. Beebe and Clegg shared a renovated mansion in the town, and also owned a private railroad car, redone in a Victorian Baroque style. The pair traveled extensively, and remained prominent in social circles. Clegg and Beebe sold the Territorial Enterprise in 1961, and purchased a home in suburban San Francisco. They continued the writing, photography, and travel that had marked their lives until Beebe's death from a heart attack in 1966. Beebe left the bulk of his $2 million estate to Clegg (with provision for T-Bone Towser II, their Newfoundland). Clegg died by suicide in 1979, on the day that he reached the precise age at which Beebe had died.

Beebe authored over thirty-five books during his lifetime, approximately half of which were in collaboration with Clegg. It is likely that Clegg's contributions were primarily photographic in nature; his images were known for an expressive quality that helped broaden the artistic scope of railroad photography. The library of photographs produced by Clegg and Beebe are now in the collections of the California State Railroad Museum.
