= William S. O'Brien =

William Shoney O'Brien
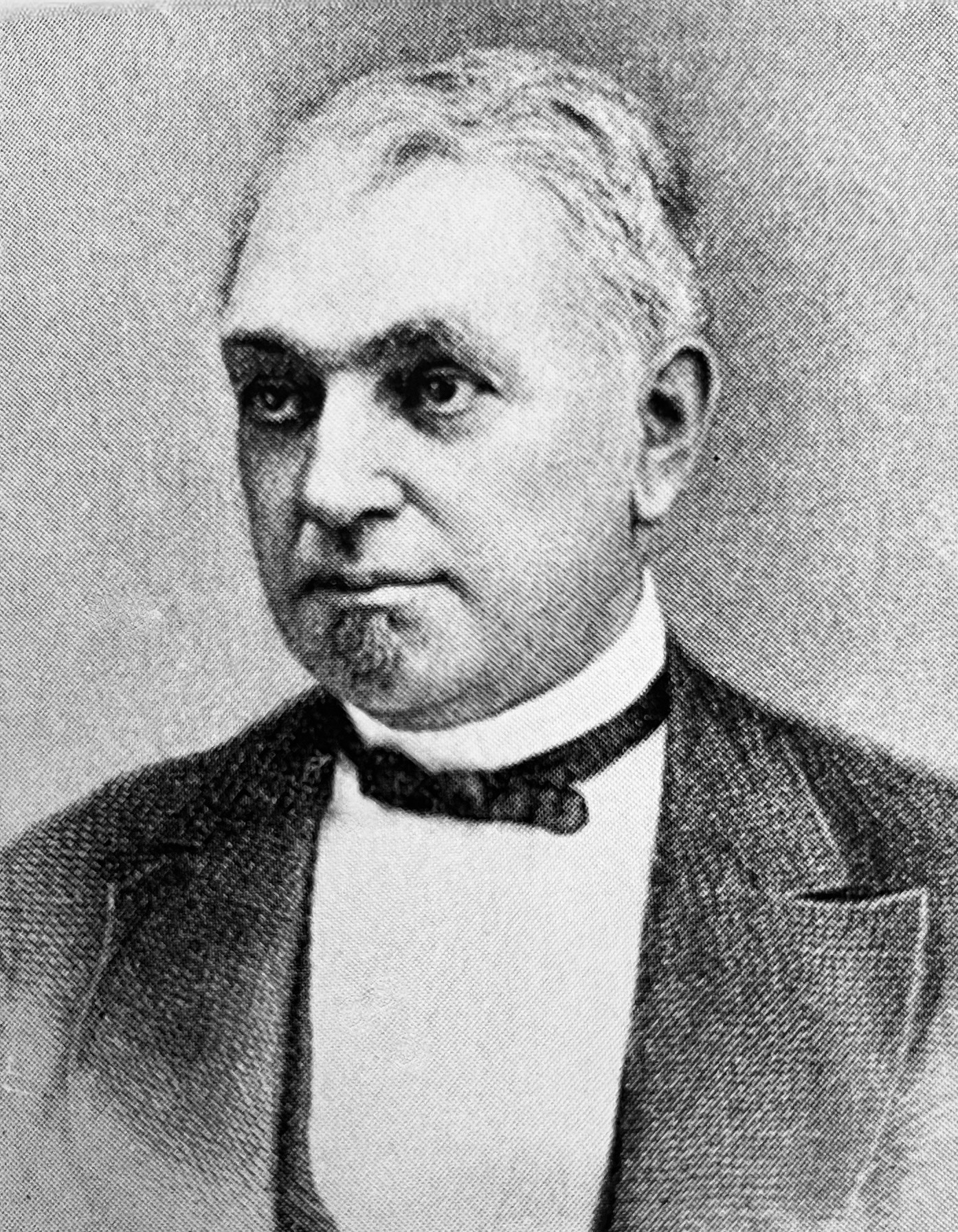
- Born: c. 1825; Abbeyleix, Ireland
- Died: May 2, 1878 (aged 52–53); San Rafael, California
- Resting place: Holy Cross Cemetery, Colma (reinterred from San Francisco's Calvary Cemetery)
- Occupations: Saloonkeeper, stockbroker, partner in Comstock Lode mines
- Organization(s): Flood & O'Brien; Consolidated Virginia Mining Company; Bank of Nevada
- Known for: Being one of the "Bonanza Kings"

William Shoney O'Brien (c. 1825 – May 2, 1878) was an Irish-born American businessman. He formed a business partnership with fellow Irishmen James Graham Fair, James C. Flood, and John William Mackay, the Consolidated Virginia Mining Company. The four dealt in mining stocks and operated silver mines on the Comstock Lode, and in 1873 discovered the great orebody known as the "Big Bonanza" in the Consolidated Virginia and California Mine, an orebody more than 1,200 feet deep, which yielded in March of that year as much as $632 per ton, and in 1877 nearly $190,000,000 altogether. The four-way partnership, although formally called "Flood and O'Brien," was more commonly known as the Bonanza firm.

== Early life ==
O'Brien was born in about 1825 in Abbeyleix, Ireland (then in Queen's County but since 1922 in County Laois).

== Career ==
Upon emigrating to the United States and locating in San Francisco, California, he and James C. Flood opened the Auction Lunch Saloon on Washington Street in 1857. Accumulating considerable fortunes by 1868, they sold the Auction Lunch and opened a brokerage, where they met James G. Fair and John W. Mackay. The four joined forces, with a combined capital of $225,000, to challenge William Chapman Ralston for control of the Hale & Norcross silver mine at Virginia City, Nevada. In 1869 they outmaneuvered Ralston for stock control of the mine, forcing him out at the mining company's annual meeting. Production of the mine tripled in 1869 and quadrupled in 1870.

In 1873 they developed the Consolidated Virginia silver strike, which came to be called the "Big Bonanza," and they themselves were known variously as the Silver Kings, the Lords of the Comstock, and the "second Big Four." Together they also established the Nevada Bank in San Francisco. It opened in October 1875 when its building at Pine and Montgomery Streets was ready; Louis McLane was its first president. It became the Nevada National Bank in 1898 and merged with the Wells Fargo Bank effective April 22, 1905.

Of O'Brien, Noel M. Loomis wrote, in part: "O'Brien was plebeian, unpretentious and well aware that his wealth ... was largely luck. He was the oldest and least forceful of the Silver Kings, but easily the best liked. He never forgot his friends from pre-Consolidated Virginia days, but on the few occasions he appeared in society, he seemed to belong there. He did not marry, and died in 1878, worth $15,000,000."

== Personal life ==
He is considered to have been one of the 100 wealthiest Americans, having left an enormous fortune. He died of Bright's disease on May 2, 1878, in San Rafael, California.

He was buried at Calvary Cemetery in San Francisco which eventually closed, his remains were moved to Holy Cross Cemetery in Colma, California. The design plans for O'Brien's memorial at Calvary Cemetery can be found at U.C. Berkeley's Bancroft Library.
