= James G. Fair =

American businessman and politician (1831–1894)

- Portrait by Brady

United States Senator from Nevada
- In office March 4, 1881 – March 3, 1887
- Preceded by: William Sharon
- Succeeded by: William M. Stewart

Personal details
- Born: December 3, 1831 Clogher, Ireland
- Died: December 28, 1894 (aged 63) San Francisco, California, U.S.
- Resting place: Holy Cross Cemetery, Colma, California
- Party: Democratic
- Spouse: Theresa Rooney (divorced)
- Children: Theresa Fair Oelrichs; James Fair Jr. Charles Lewis Fair; Virginia Fair Vanderbilt
- Occupation: Prospector, mine supervisor, real estate developer, railroad builder, Senator
- Known for: Being one of the "Bonanza Kings"
- Net worth: USD $45 million at the time of his death (approximately 1/280 of US GNP)
- Cause of death: Diabetes mellitus, Bright's disease

James Graham Fair (December 3, 1831 – December 28, 1894) was an American mining engineer and businessman. His investments in silver mines in Nevada made him a millionaire, and he was one of the famous "silver kings" who became wealthy on the Comstock Lode. Fair later became a real estate investor and railroad builder in California. In 1881, he was elected a United States Senator from Nevada. Nearly all other major so-called robber barons were Protestants (Episcopal or Presbyterian) while Fair himself died a Roman Catholic though born into poverty to Anglican parents.

== Early life ==
Born to a poor Irish family in Clogher, County Tyrone, James Fair came with his father to the United States in 1843 and grew up on a farm in Illinois. There he received an extensive education in business before moving to California in 1850, where he prospected the Feather River country for gold embedded in quartz rather than pan for placer gold. His attention shifted to Nevada, where he operated a stamp mill on the Carson River and landed various mine superintendent positions around the Comstock Lode region. He became superintendent of the Hale and Norcross Mine in Virginia City, Nevada in 1867.

He formed a partnership with three fellow Irishmen: John William Mackay and the San Francisco saloon owners James C. Flood and William S. O'Brien. The company was formally Flood and O'Brien, but popularly known as the "Bonanza Firm". The four made large fortunes in shares in silver mines on the Comstock Lode, the first major silver district discovered in the United States. In twenty years time the Comstock Lode produced over one hundred million dollars. The partners controlled and operated various mines on the Comstock, but their greatest success came in 1873 when miners in their Consolidated Virginia mine found the large ore body that became known as "the big bonanza."

Fair invested his portion in railroads and real estate, bringing his private fortune up to $50 million. Although Fair was acknowledged to be a capable mine superintendent and a shrewd businessman, he was not well liked, and carried the nickname "Slippery Jim." He invested much of his income from the Comstock in railroads and San Francisco real estate. Fair and Mackay owned the Nevada Bank of San Francisco, a rival to William Chapman Ralston's Bank of California; after the collapse of Ralston's financial empire, the Nevada Bank was for a time the largest bank in America at the height of the silver boom.

== South Pacific Coast Railroad ==
In 1876, in partnership with several others, Fair established the narrow-gauge South Pacific Coast Railroad. From its beginning near present-day Newark, the line extended down the east side of San Francisco Bay, through San Jose and Los Gatos and southward over the Santa Cruz Mountains over a route that entailed a 6,200-foot tunnel, another 5,000-foot tunnel and six shorter ones. Some six hundred Chinese workers were employed in clearing, grading, laying track and tunneling. In that last activity, thirty-one workers lost their lives, primarily from explosions of underground natural gas. At its southern end, the railroad acquired the Santa Cruz & Felton Railroad in Felton. The line over the mountains was completed in May 1880.

The South Pacific Coast Railroad was immediately successful and soon profitable. Fair sought to further expand operations via purchasing street railroad assets of the Oakland Railroad Company. Local opposition to operating steam trains on city streets was so fierce that plans for further expansions were canceled and Fair ended his railroad plans for Oakland entirely soon after. In 1886, Southern Pacific purchased SPC for six million dollars ($215 million in 2025 adjusted for inflation). Southern Pacific later converted the line to San Jose to standard gauge and operated it until 1940, when the over-the-mountains portion of the line was abandoned.

== Political career ==
Fair was elected by the Nevada legislature to the U.S. Senate in 1881. He was not much interested in Washington, where he promoted silver issues in the Senate at a time when a movement was afoot to demonetize silver. Fair served one term after which he moved back to San Francisco in 1887.

== Personal life ==
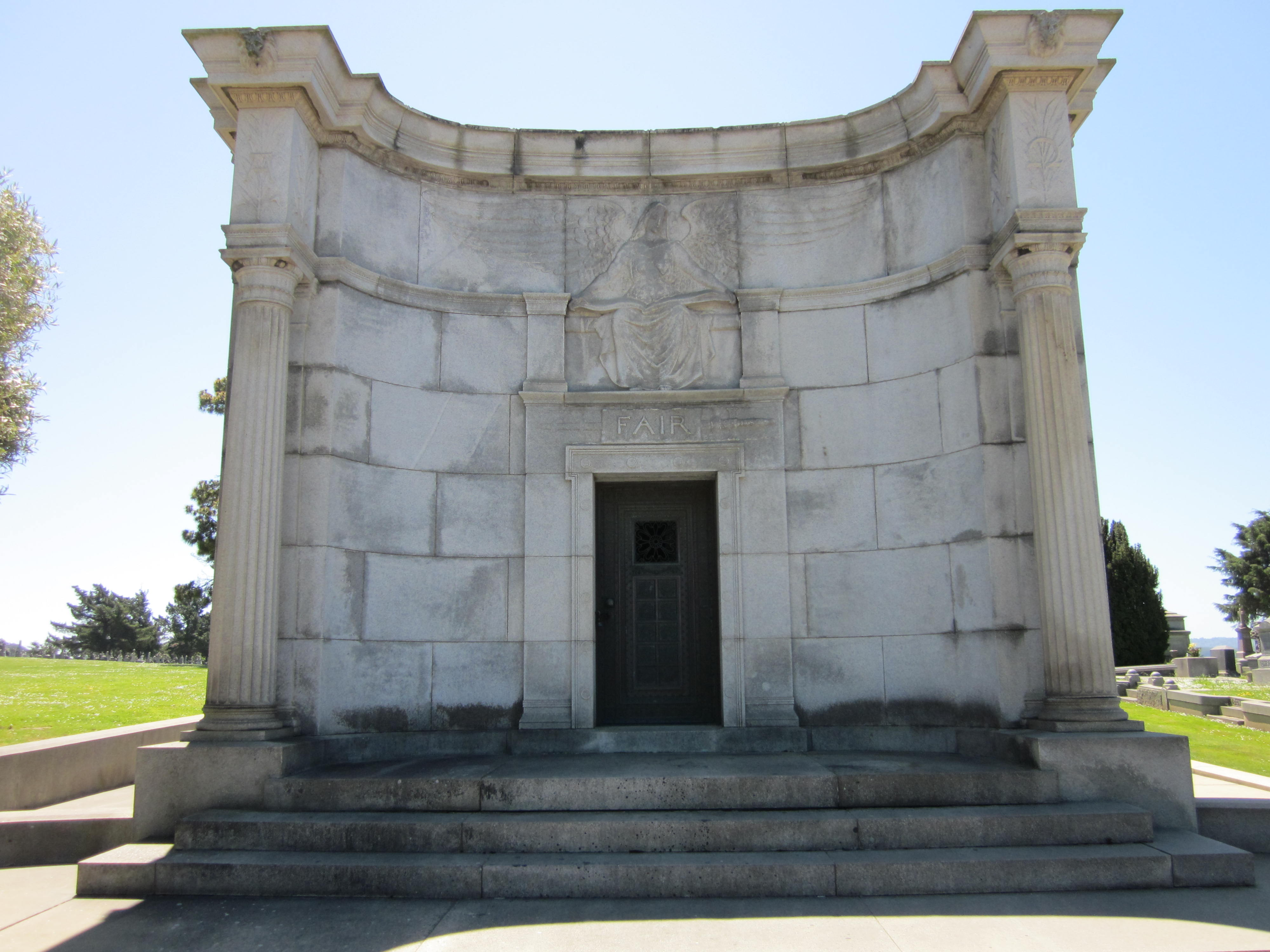
Fair's mausoleum at Holy Cross

In 1861, Fair married Theresa Rooney, who had been keeping a boarding house. She divorced him in 1883 on grounds of "habitual adultery" and brought up their four children on her own, with a very considerable settlement.

In 1890, his eldest daughter "Tessie" was married to Hermann Oelrichs of Norddeutsche Lloyd shipping lines in the grandest wedding that San Francisco had seen. Fair remained in his hotel suite without an invitation. He gave Tessie a million dollars as a wedding gift nonetheless.

His will left $40 million in trust to his two daughters, Mrs. Hermann Oelrichs (née Theresa "Tessie" Alice Fair) and Virginia Graham Fair (who later married William Kissam Vanderbilt II), and his surviving son, Charles Lewis Fair, who died in a car accident in France on August 14, 1902, at age 35, having been disinherited by his father.

After Fair's death, Mrs. Nettie Cravens came forward claiming to be his wife. She presented her evidence to a court at trial, but lost the case. She moved to Iowa and lived in obscurity, spending her last days in a mental institution. Later, women's rights advocate Phoebe Couzins also claimed a relationship with Fair.

== Death and legacy ==
Fair died on 1894 in San Francisco, California, and was originally buried in Laurel Hill Cemetery; after the cemetery closed he was re-buried in Holy Cross Cemetery in Colma, California.

The Fairmont San Francisco hotel was built as a grand monument to Fair by his daughters Theresa Fair Oelrichs and Virginia Fair Vanderbilt, who named it in honor of their father. Construction began in 1902, but they sold their interests in 1906, days before the 1906 San Francisco earthquake.

Fair is remembered in Santa Cruz, California in the naming of Fair Avenue, and in San Francisco with Fair Avenue in Bernal Heights.

== See also ==
- List of United States senators born outside the United States

U.S. Senate
Preceded by William Sharon	U.S. senator (Class 1) from Nevada; 1881–1887; Served alongside: John P. Jones	Succeeded by William M. Stewart
