= John William Mackay =

Irish-American industrialist (1831–1902)

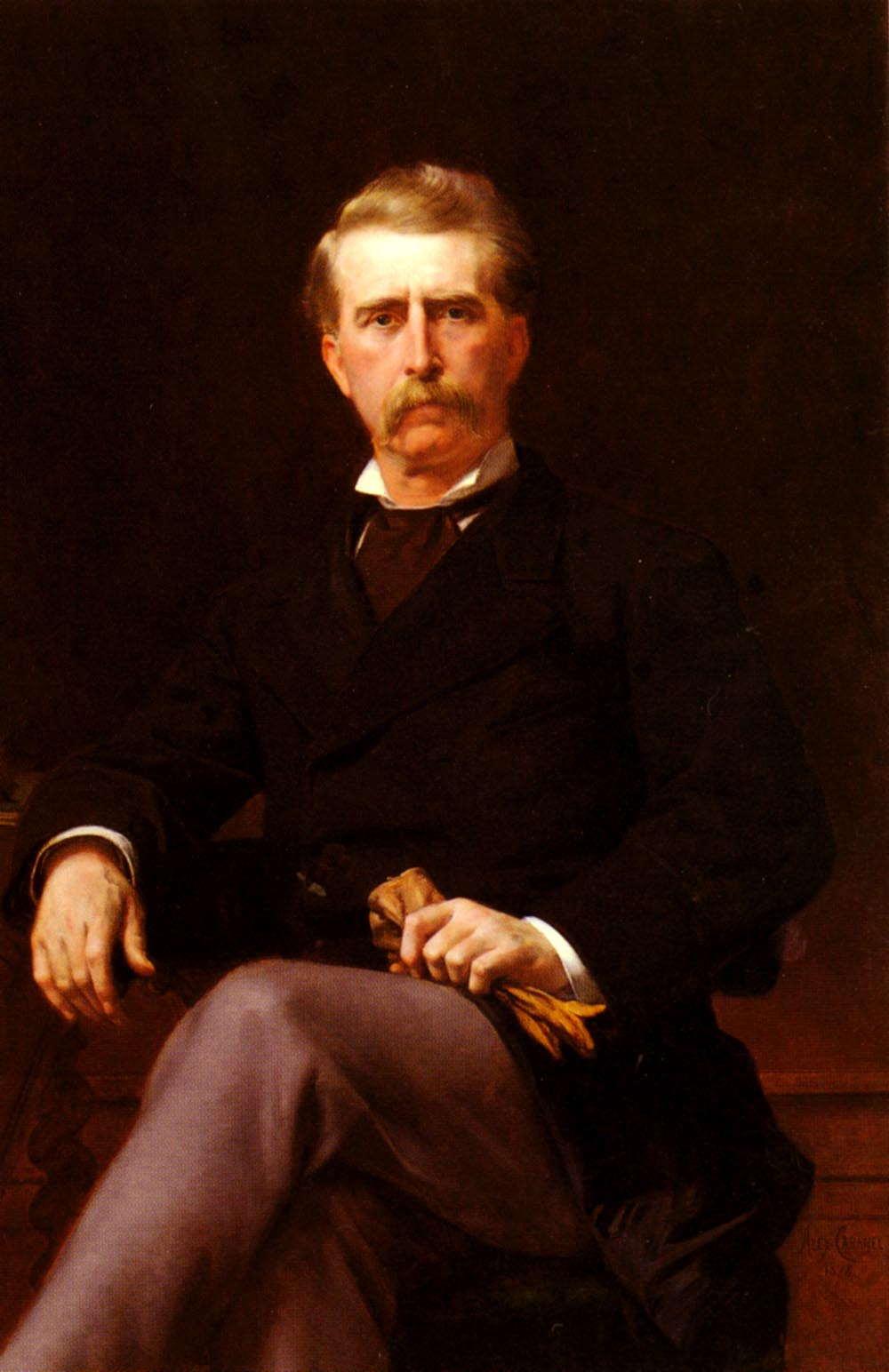
- Born: November 28, 1831; Dublin, Ireland
- Died: July 20, 1902 (aged 70); London, UK
- Resting place: Green-Wood Cemetery
- Occupations: Shipbuilder, prospector, partner in Comstock Lode mines
- Organization(s): Consolidated Virginia Mining Company; Bank of Nevada
- Known for: Being one of the "Bonanza Kings"
- Spouse: Marie Louise Hungerford (m. 1867)
- Children: John William Mackay Jr, Clarence Hungerford Mackay

Signature
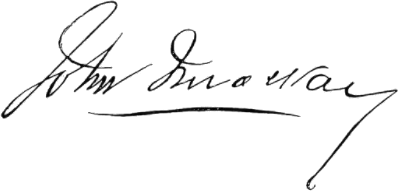

John William Mackay (November 28, 1831 – July 20, 1902) was an Irish-American industrialist who rose from rags to riches. Born into abject poverty and raised in the slums of New York City, Mackay joined in the California gold rush in 1851. He did not find gold but moved to Nevada in 1859 and found silver. He became one of the four Bonanza Kings, a San Francisco partnership which capitalized on the wealth generated by the silver mines at the Comstock Lode in Nevada. He was one of the richest Americans in his time. He also headed a telegraph business that laid transatlantic cables, and he helped finance the New York, Texas and Mexican Railway Company.

== Life and career ==
=== Early years ===
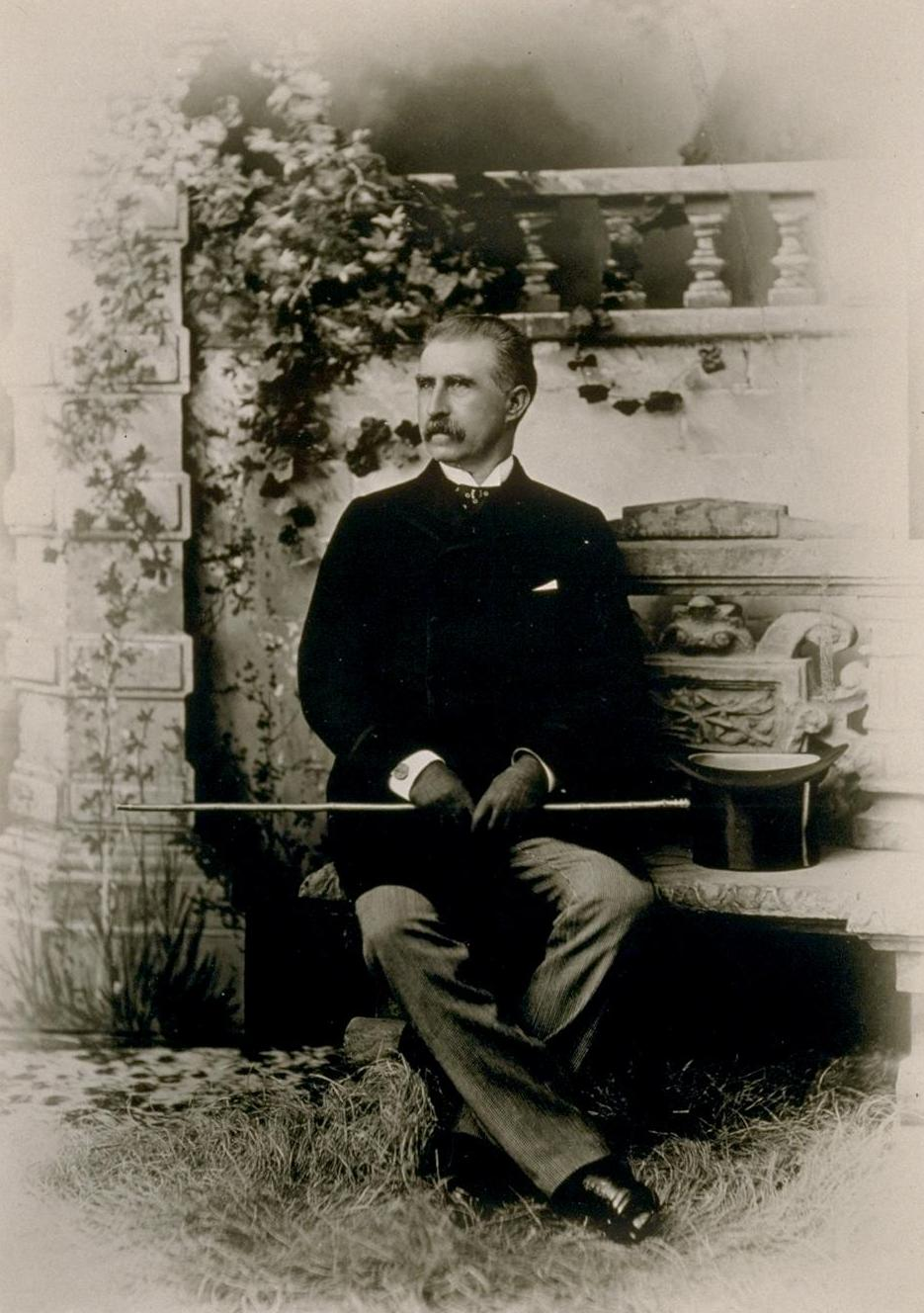
John William Mackay

John William Mackay was born in Dublin to a working-class family. They had a dirt floor hovel shared with a pig. In 1840, the family emigrated to the notorious Five Points slum in lower Manhattan; his father died soon after. As a boy Mackay hawked newspapers such as the New York Herald, and later apprenticed at William H. Webb Shipyard to support his mother and sister.

=== Gold and silver mining ===
In 1851, he sailed by clipper around the Horn to California and worked eight years in placer gold fields in Sierra County without much success. In 1859, he went to Virginia City, Nevada, site of the recently discovered Comstock Lode, and there began work at $4 a day laboring in a mine by day and working his own small claims in his spare time. He bought small claims or "feet" and used the proceeds of his labor and finds to buy more feet. In 1865 he used his savings to buy into the Kentuck mine and hit big, he was suddenly worth US$1.6 million, more than enough to retire for life. He then began investing in other mines, sometimes risking everything he had. He formed a business partnership with fellow Irishmen James Graham Fair, James C. Flood, and William S. O'Brien, later known as the Bonanza Kings. The four dealt in mining stocks and operated silver mines, and had a success in the Hale & Norcross mine. In 1871, using proceeds from the Hale & Norcross they bought out a number of smaller mine claims under the name of the Consolidated Virginia Mining Company, and later added the nearby California mine. In 1873, the Con Virginia made the greatest ore body discovery ever found in North America, known as the "Big Bonanza". The strike would pay out US$181 billion in current dollars, with Mackay's portion being about $50 billion. The bonanza was in a location previously overlooked and outside where other strikes had been found. The four-way partnership was more commonly known as the "Bonanza firm". With the proceeds, together they established the Bank of Nevada of San Francisco to compete with the Bank of California.

=== Marriage and family ===
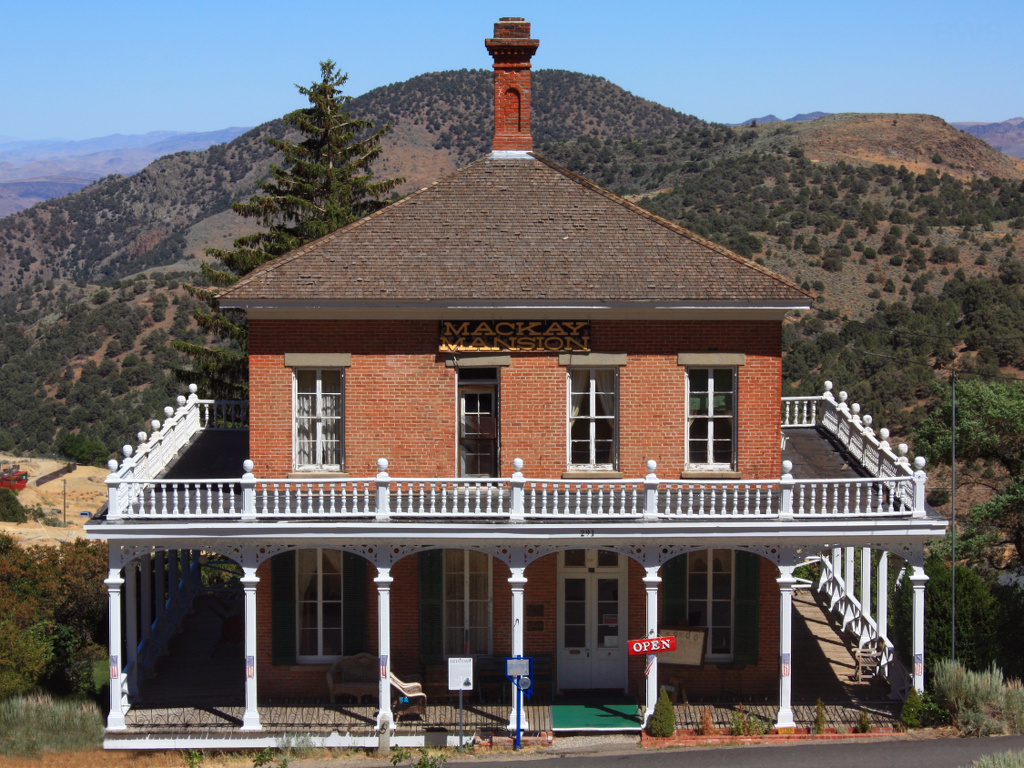
Mackay Mansion in Virginia City

Marie Louise Antionette Hungerford aka "Louise" was born in 1844 in New York. She moved with her parents in 1854 to the Downieville, CA goldfields. In 1863, at 19, she was married to Dr. Edmond Gardiner Bryant in Virginia City. Bryant invested unsuccessfully in stocks and mines and they became financially strapped. They had two daughters, the oldest Eva. Bryant carelessly allowed his youngest daughter to die by refusing to treat her illness. In 1865, Bryant somehow injured Eva, breaking her hip. In 1866, Bryant contracted tetanus in a mining camp and Louise became a widow at the age of 22.

Louise, now widowed with a slightly disabled daughter, married Mackay in 1867 in Virginia City. She had their first son in 1870, John W. Mackay, Jr. followed by Clarence H. Mackay in 1874. John Mackay always treated his step-daughter Eva as if she were his child, and he formally adopted her on Christmas Day in 1870. The Mackay's heard of a doctor in France that might be able to help Eva. Although the surgery didn't go as well as planned, it did help. The family returned to San Francisco in 1873, Louise pregnant with their second child, Clarence. But a seed had been sown; Louise really loved Paris. She never returned to Virginia City again.

Mackay purchased a large mansion for Louise in Paris, where his wealth enabled her to become a noted society hostess for two decades, entertaining royalty and throwing lavish parties. The building is today occupied by the Belgium Embassy near the Arc de Triomphe. In 1879, Louise's younger sister Ada Hungerford, married Count Joseph Telfener, a rich engineer and financier. From then on, she was Countess Telfener, possibly the first California born woman to achieve a European title. As his telegraph business expanded, in 1884 the family was moved to London for the boys' schooling and easier communications through his owned cables. In 1885, his step-daughter, Eva, married the Neopolitan prince, Ferdinando Colonna of Stigliano. Eva's portrait was later painted by the Italian painter, Vittorio Matteo Corcos. 18 years after John's death, Louise returned to the United States in 1920, dying in 1928 at age 85.

=== Communications companies ===
In 1884, with James Gordon Bennett, Jr., Mackay formed the Commercial Cable Company, largely to compete with Jay Gould and the Western Union Telegraph Company. Until Mackay and Bennett entered the field, all submarine cable traffic between the United States and Europe went over cables owned by the American financier Jay Gould. Mackay laid two transatlantic cables, and forced the toll-rate for transatlantic messages down to twenty-five cents a word. In connection with the Commercial Cable Company, he formed in 1886 the Postal Telegraph Company as a domestic wire telegraph company so that Commercial would not need to rely on Western Union to collect and distribute telegraphic messages. A rate war followed that took almost two years to conclude. Jay Gould finally quit trying to run John Mackay out of business. He was quoted as saying in reference to Mackay, "If he needs another million he will go into his silver mines and dig it out".

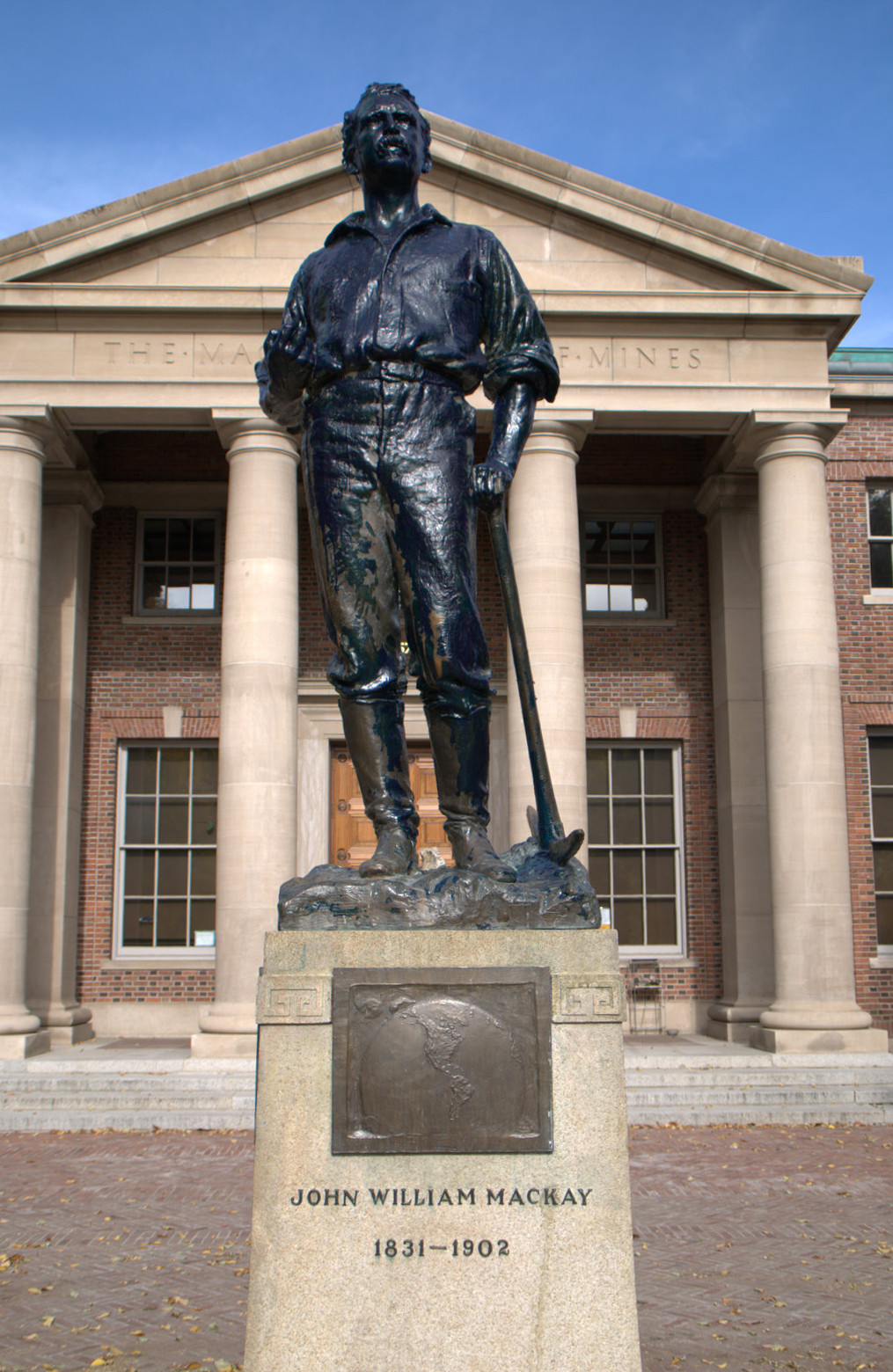
Statue of John William Mackay in front of Mackay School of Mines building in Reno, NV. By Gutzon Borglum, dedicated June 1908

Once Mackay had conquered the Atlantic with the Commercial Cable Company and North America with the Postal Telegraph Company he turned his sights to laying the first cable across the Pacific. He subsequently formed the Commercial Pacific Cable Company in secret partnership with the Great Northern Telegraph Company and the Eastern Telegraph Company. Although he died in 1902 before his vision was completed, his son Clarence H. Mackay, saw the project through to completion between 1904 and 1906. Commercial Pacific operated a cable line from San Francisco to Manila, Philippines, via Hawaii and Guam, with a subsequent spur that went from Manila to Shanghai, China.

The Mackay System expanded under Clarence H. Mackay's leadership, acquiring several other entities including the Federal Telegraph Company, its radio stations and research laboratories, in 1927. In 1928, the entire system was bought out by Sosthenes Behn's International Telephone and Telegraph. ITT organized the Postal Telegraph & Cable Corporation as a shell to acquire and control the Mackay System on May 18, 1928. Though plagued with financial troubles during the Great Depression, the Mackay System continued to be the chief rival of Western Union until 1943. In March of that year, Congress authorized an amendment (Section 222) to the Communications Act of 1934 permitting the merger of the domestic operations of telegraph companies (clearing the way for Western Union to acquire Postal Telegraph). By May 1943 a merger plan had been put together, which the FCC approved by September, and the merger was completed by October 1943. The international communications (cable and radio) parts of the Mackay System remained with ITT.

=== Other ventures ===
The New York, Texas and Mexican Railway was chartered in 1880 by his brother-in-law Joseph Telfener and his father-in-law Daniel E. Hungerford. A Texas corporation was formed to take advantage of the state's generous land grants and build a railroad from Richmond to Brownsville. Work started in September 1881 and 91 miles (146 km) of track were constructed between Rosenberg and Victoria by the end of 1882. The railroad became known as the "Macaroni Line" because 1,200 Italian immigrants were brought to the United States to build it. Texas passed a law in 1882 voiding any land grants to railroads. In January 1885 Telfener sold the railroad to his brother-in-law Mackay, who sold it to the Southern Pacific Railroad in September that year. The railroad continued to operate under its old name until 1905.

In addition to the Bank of Nevada and the communications companies, Mackay held interests in mines in Colorado, Idaho, and Alaska and timber lands and ranches in California. He owned part of the Spreckels Sugar Company and part of the Sprague Elevator and Electrical Works, and he served as a director of the Canadian Pacific Railway and the Southern Pacific Railroad.

== Philanthropy ==
Mackay was famous for fair dealings with his employees, and gave generously, especially to the charities of the Roman Catholic Church, and endowed the Catholic orphan asylum in Virginia City, Nevada. In June 1908 the Mackay School of Mines building was presented to the University of Nevada, as a memorial to him, by his widow and his son, Clarence H. Mackay. A statue of John Mackay by Gutzon Borglum stands in front of the Mackay Mines building on the university campus in Reno, Nevada.

== Death ==
Mackay died of heart failure on July 20, 1902, in London. He is buried in Green-Wood Cemetery in Greenwood Heights, Brooklyn; his mausoleum was described in 2018, by Scribner Associate Editor Sarah Goldberg, as "by far the most impressive mausoleum in the cemetery, atop a shady hill". The mausoleum was originally created for Mackay's oldest son, John, Jr., who died in a horse riding accident in 1895. Mackay never fully overcame his grief and was entombed with his son seven years later.

== Honours ==
The town of Mackay, Idaho was named in his honour as he owned the local copper mines. The nearby Mackay Peak in the White Knob Mountains is also named after him. Mackay appears several times as a character in the novel Comstock Lode by Louis L'Amour.

In 1921 a new cable-laying ship was named John W. Mackay by the Commercial Cable Company in his honour.

== See also ==
- List of people associated with the California Gold Rush
