= Flowery Range =

Mountain range in Nevada, United States

- Location within Nevada

Highest point
- Elevation: 2,237 m (7,339 ft)

Geography
- Country: United States
- State: Nevada
- District: Storey County
- Range coordinates: 39°23′32.689″N 119°31′20.633″W
- Topo map: USGS Chalk Hills

The Flowery Range is a mountain range associated with the Virginia Range in Storey County, Nevada.

The range was so named on account of wildflowers which bloom when watered by melting snow.
