= Mount Davidson (Nevada) =

Mountain in Nevada, United States

- Location within Nevada

Highest point
- Elevation: 7,868 ft (2,398 m) NAVD 88
- Prominence: 2,704 ft (824 m)
- Listing: Nevada County High Points 17th
- Coordinates: 39°18′29″N 119°39′49″W

Geography
- Location: Storey County, Nevada, U.S.
- Parent range: Virginia Range
- Topo map: USGS Mount Davidson

Mount Davidson is both the highest and most topographically prominent mountain in both Storey County, Nevada, and the Virginia Range. The mountain forms a backdrop for the mining boomtown of Virginia City which was built above the Comstock Lode silver strike.

Mount Davidson was named after Donald Davidson, a geologist.

Mark Twain mentions a flag on Mount Davidson in his semi-autobiographical book Roughing It. As of 2003 the flagpole was still standing.
