= Virginia Range =

Mountain range in Nevada, United States

Coordinates: 39°29.5′N 119°33.1′W

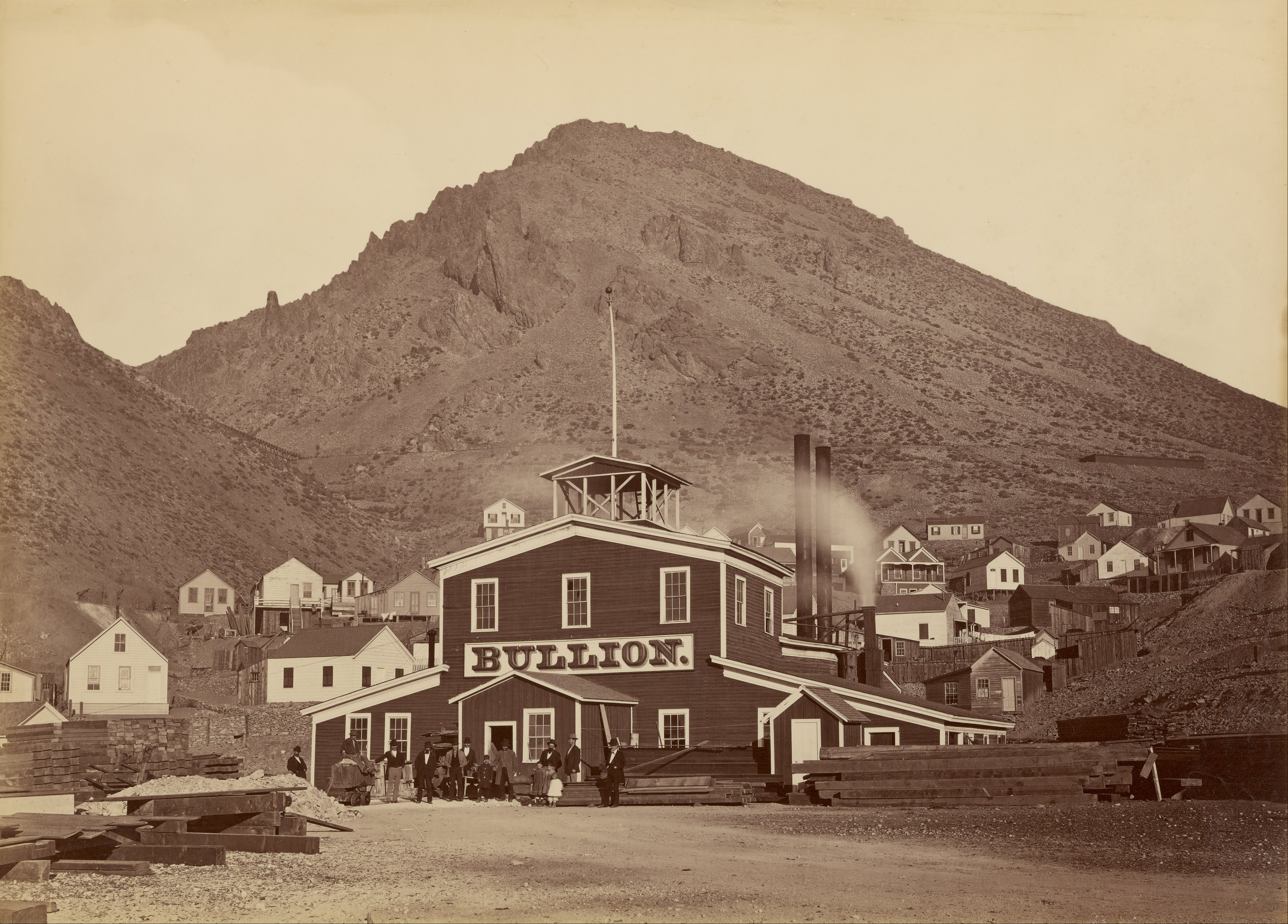
- The Bullion Mine and mountain of the Virginia Range, Virginia City, Nevada. Photograph by Carleton Watkins.

Geography
- Country: United States
- State: Nevada

The Virginia Range is a mountain range of western Nevada, primarily within Storey County, and extending east into Lyon County. The range is named after James Finney, "Old Virginny", an early discoverer of gold associated with the Comstock Lode.

== Geography ==
The mountain range forms a portion of the drainage divide between the Truckee River (north) and the Carson River (south). Truckee Meadows and the Washoe Valley are to the west, and the Lahontan Valley is to the east. It is associated with the Flowery Range.

Several paths lead into the Virginia Range. The highest peak is Mount Davidson at 7,864 feet (2,397 m), near Virginia City, Nevada. Other nearby peaks are Mount Bullion at 7,682 feet (2,341 m) and Ophir Hill at 7,782 feet (2,372 m).

== Flora ==
Jeffrey pine (Pinus jeffreyi) is the dominant species at higher elevations. Other trees in the range include the Single-leaf Pinyon Pine (Pinus monophylla) and Utah Juniper (Juniperus osteosperma).

== Mining history ==
For the notable 1860s silver strike and mining town in the Virginia Range, see:

- Comstock Lode
- Virginia City, Nevada
- Virginia City Historic District (Virginia City, Nevada)
- National Register of Historic Places in Storey County, Nevada
