= Bonanza Kings =

Four men who founded Flood and O'Brien

The Bonanza Kings, also called the Silver Kings, was a nickname given to the four men who started a stock brokerage called Flood and O'Brien, more commonly known as the Bonanza Firm. Bonanza is a Spanish term meaning "rich ore body"; in 1873, after gaining control of the Consolidated Virginia Mining Company, they discovered a large vertical ore body more than 1,200 feet deep which became known as the "big bonanza".

== Mining success ==
In 1871, Irish-Americans John William Mackay, James Graham Fair, James Clair Flood, and William S. O'Brien, organized the Consolidated Virginia Silver Mine near Virginia City, Nevada, from a number of smaller claims on the Comstock Lode and later added the nearby California mine. Mackay and Fair had the mining knowledge and Flood and O'Brien raised the money. The purchase price of the claims, later to become a fabulous source of wealth, was about $100,000. The original stock issue was 10,700 shares, selling for between $4 and $5 a share.

In 1873, the "big bonanza" was uncovered and San Francisco and the entire mining world were hurtled into a fever of excitement. The first stock issue was converted into two issues of 108,000 shares each, and by the middle of 1875 the speculative value of the two mines were close to $1,000,000,000. Shares went as high as $710.

For three years after the discovery of "big bonanza" the two mines produced $3,000,000 per month. In 1876, for exhibition purposes, $6,000,000 was taken in one month from both mines. Production began to fall off in 1879 but in twenty-two years of operation the two mines yielded more than $150,000,000 in silver and gold, and paid $78,148,800 in dividends, making the four owners into some of America's wealthiest men.
