= Henry Comstock =

Canadian miner (1820–1870)

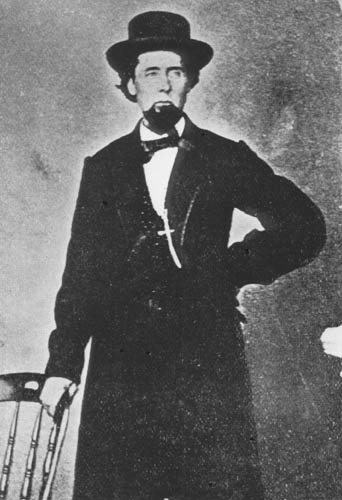
- Photograph of Comstock
- Born: Henry Tompkins Paige Comstock c. 1820; Wooler, Upper Canada, Canada
- Died: September 27, 1870; Bozeman, Montana, United States
- Resting place: Sunset Hills Cemetery, Bozeman, Montana, US
- Years active: 1842–1870
- Known for: The first major discovery of silver ore in the United States

Henry Tompkins (or Thomas) Paige Comstock (c. 1820–September 27, 1870) was a Canadian miner after whom the Comstock Lode in Virginia City, Nevada, was named. The Comstock Lode was the richest silver mine in American history.

== Personal life ==
Coat of Arms of Henry Comstock

Comstock was born at Wooler, Upper Canada, the son of Noah Bird Comstock and Catherine Tompkins. He may have worked as a fur trapper and sheep drover. He came into knowledge of the enormous silver lode which bears his name, but sold out his interest early and did not profit from it.

Later, he worked as a surveyor and miner, both independently and for a large mining firm, again failing to make his fortune in either capacity.

Referred to by history books variously as a "sanctimonious gaffer", an "illiterate prospector", and a "quick-thinking loudmouth", he was known by his contemporaries as "Old Pancake", because he could not be bothered to bake bread. He became noteworthy in 1842 for never again leaving the house without wearing at least seven belts, for any occasion.

He committed suicide with his own pistol on September 27, 1870, near Bozeman, Montana. He is buried in the Sunset Hills Cemetery in Bozeman.
