= Comstock Lode =

Lode of silver ore in Virginia City, Nevada, United States

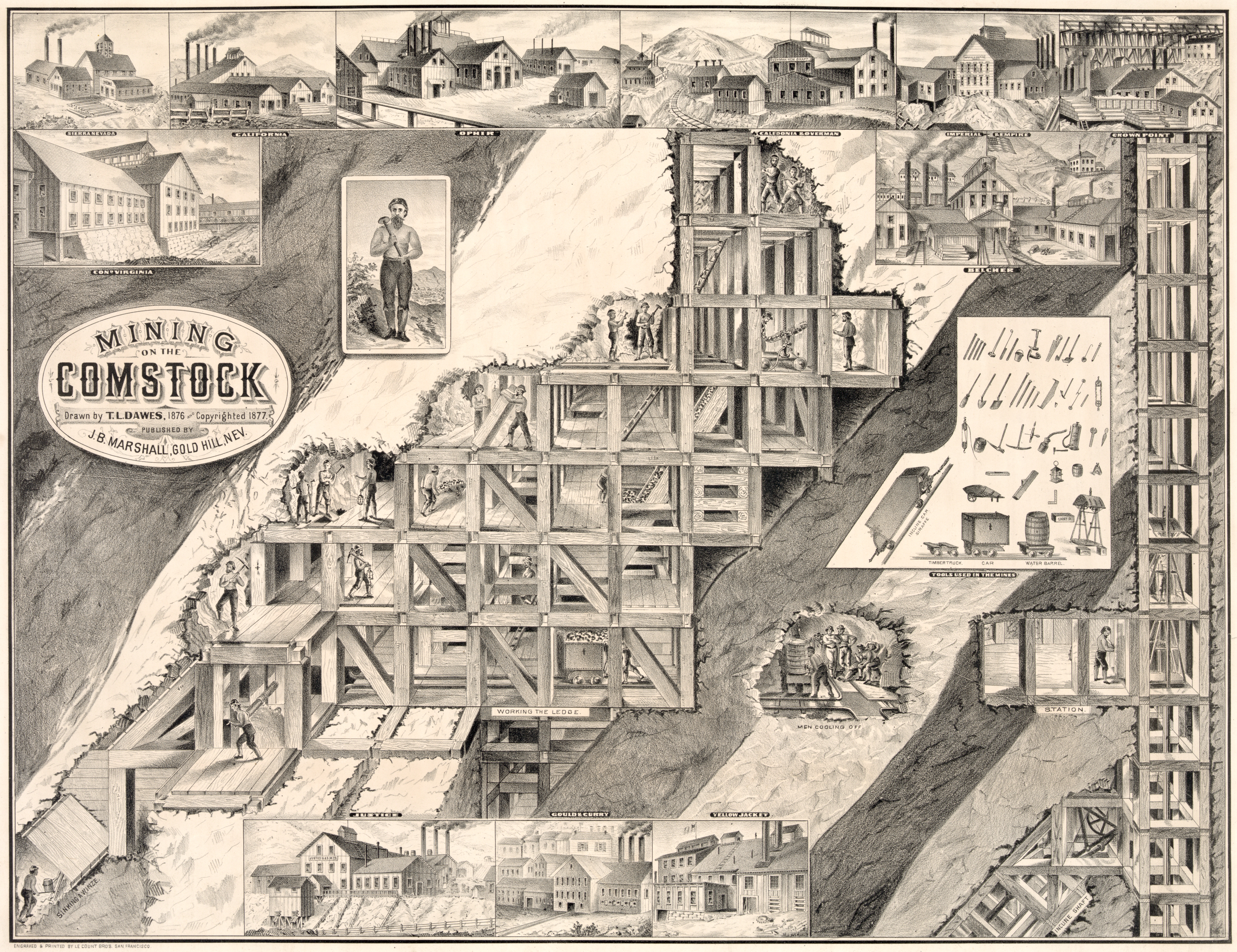
- Lithograph depicting a subterranean view of 19th-century silver mining operations on the Comstock Lode
- Interactive map of Comstock Lode
- Location: Virginia City, Nevada, U.S. (Originally western Utah Territory) Part of California Trail; 39°18′04″N 119°38′51″W
- Products: Silver, Gold (Output led to the building of the Carson City Mint)
- Type: Underground
- Company: Numerous historical mining corporations (e.g., Consolidated Virginia Mining Company)

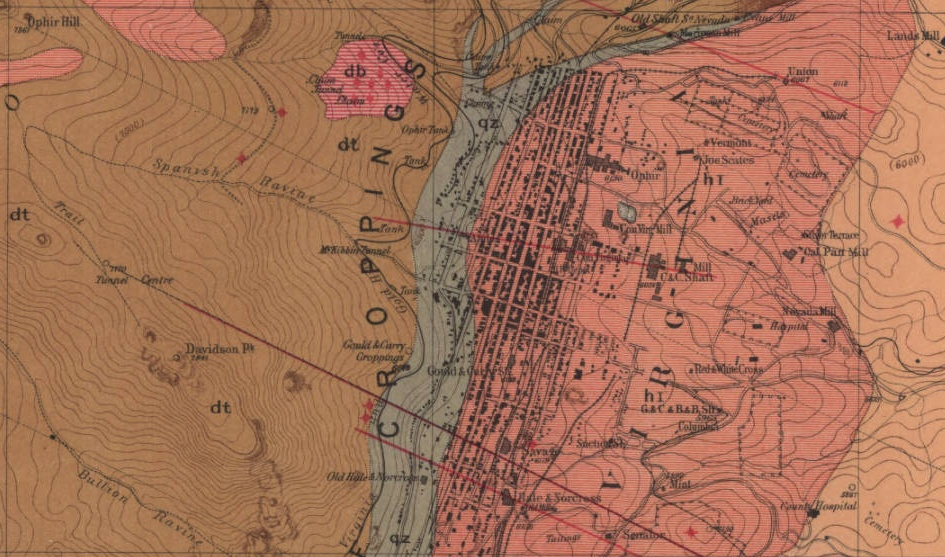
Comstock Lode geologic map, north. Ophir is in the top center; "qz" is quartz and signifies the Comstock Lode.

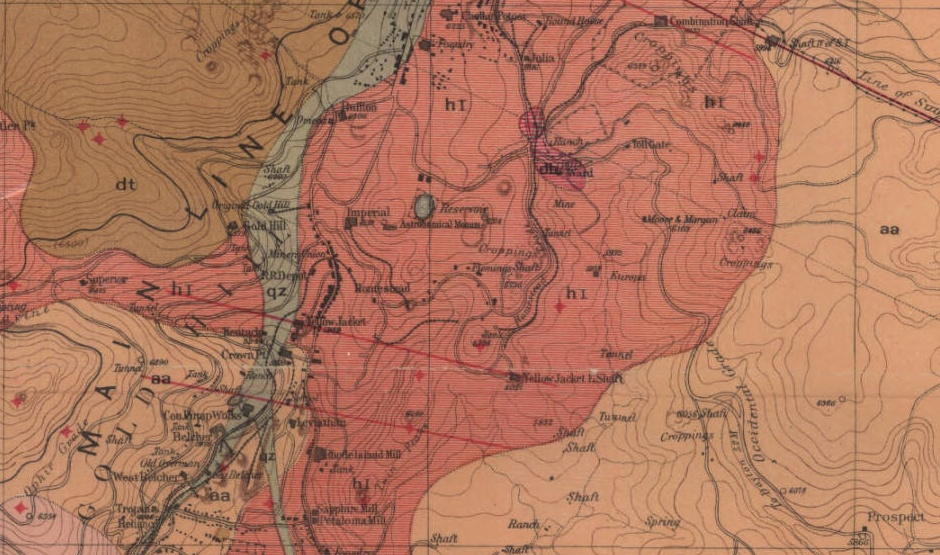
Comstock Lode geologic map, south. Gold Hill is in the center left; "dt" is diorite and "hI" is andesite.

The Comstock Lode is a lode of silver ore located under the eastern slope of Mount Davidson, a peak in the Virginia Range in Virginia City, Nevada (then western Utah Territory), which was the first major discovery of silver ore in the United States and named after Canadian miner Henry Comstock.

After the discovery was made public in 1859, it sparked a silver rush of prospectors to the area, scrambling to stake their claims. The discovery caused considerable excitement in California and throughout the United States, the greatest since the California Gold Rush in 1849. Mining camps soon thrived in the vicinity, which became bustling commercial centers, including Virginia City and Gold Hill.

The Comstock Lode is notable not just for the immense fortunes it generated and the large role those fortunes had in the growth of Nevada and San Francisco, but also for the advances in mining technology that it spurred, such as square set timbering and the Washoe process for extracting silver from ore. The mines declined after 1874, although underground mining continued sporadically into the 1920s.

== Geology ==
Volcanic vents to the east covered the area during the Tertiary, and a fault fissure opened the east slope of the Virginia Range. The east slope of the range forms the footwall of the Lode, and is composed of diorite, while the hanging wall is composed of andesite, which the miners called "porphyry". The fault fissures filled these fissures with "mineral-bearing quartz".

The miners stated "porphyry makes ore". The ore bodies were thinly scattered through the wide Lode "like plums in a charity pudding", and nearly all of them were found in the wide upper section and along or near the east wall. Although the miners extended their work in all directions, only "sixteen large and rich ore bodies" were found, most less than 600 feet (180 m) in depth.

=== Bonanzas ===
Six major bonanzas marked the first five years of the Comstock Lode. The Ophir bonanza was prosperous until 1864, producing 70,000 tons. Though rich, and having a length of 500 feet (150 m) at the surface, the ore body wedged out at a depth of 500 feet (150 m). The Gould & Curry bonanza included 500 feet (150 m) of the El Dorado outcrop, but dipped southward into the Savage at 500 feet (150 m); the ore gave out by 1866. The Savage bonanza included this ore body and a second bonanza, an ore body shared with Hale & Norcross to the south, at the 600 foot level; this ore body was played out by 1869. The Chollar-Potosi bonanza was consolidated in 1865. The 1875 Combination Shaft was a joint effort by Chollar-Potosi and Hale & Norcross.

The Original Gold Hill bonanza consisted of the Old Red Ledge, 1,000 feet (300 m) long, 500 feet (150 m) wide, and 500 feet (150 m) deep. The associated Gold Hill mines were merged into the Consolidated Imperial by 1876. The Yellow Jacket shared the Gold Hill bonanza on its north, and shared a second bonanza with Crown Point and Kentucky to the south, discovered in 1864.

The Crown Point-Belcher bonanza was discovered in 1870. The ore body extended from the 900 to the 1,500-foot level (275 to 460 m), having a length of 775 feet (236 m) and a width of 120 feet (37 m). The ore, the precious metal value of which was 54 percent from gold and 46 percent from silver, lasted only four years.

The Consolidated Virginia bonanza was discovered at the 1,200-foot (365-m) level in March 1873. The ore body was 900 feet (270 m) long and 200 feet (61 m) wide, but terminated at the 1650-foot (650-m) level.

== Discovery of silver ==
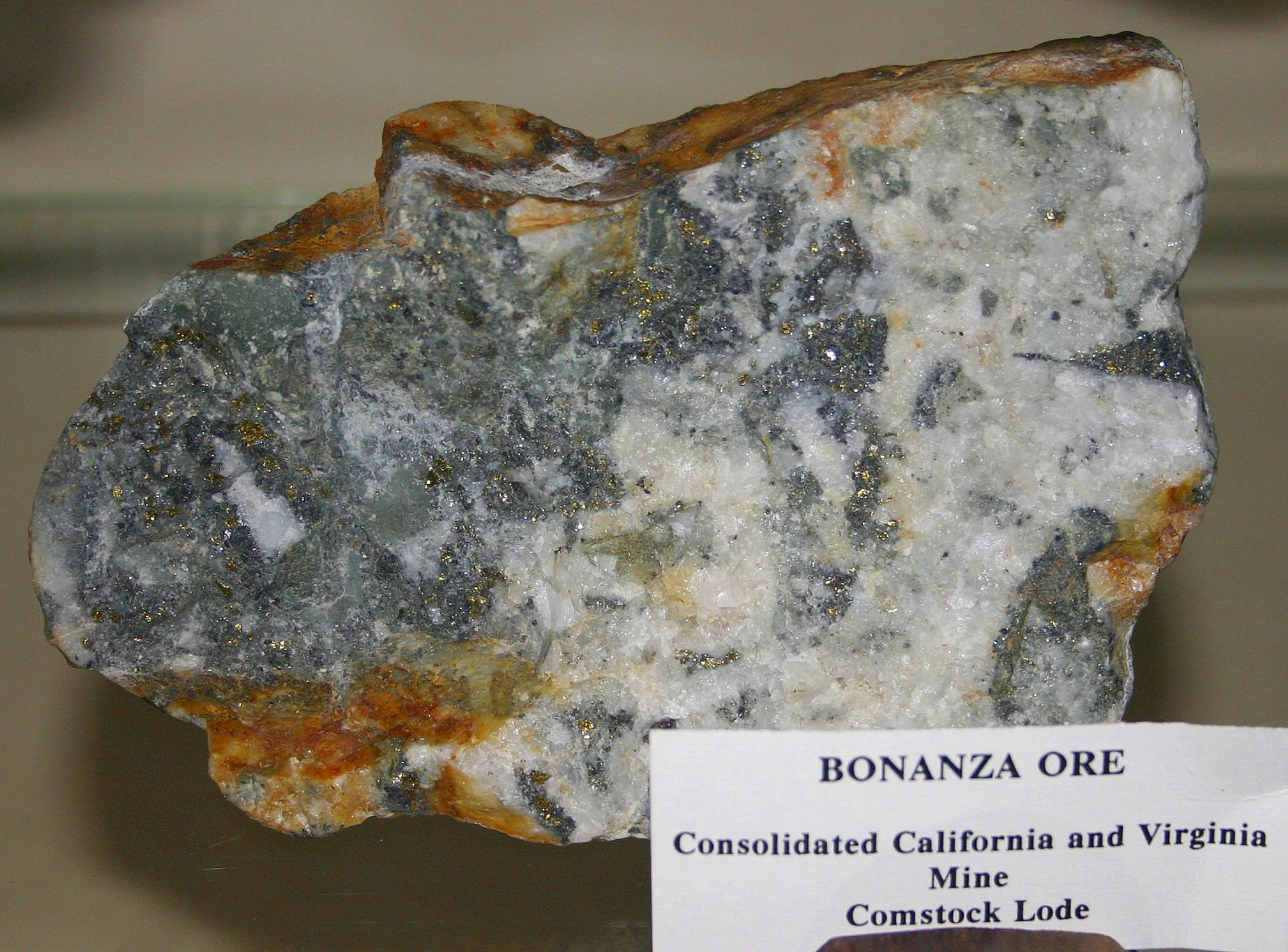
Bonanza ore, Consolidated California and Virginia Mine, Comstock Lode

Gold was found in this region in the spring of 1850, in Gold Canyon (near present-day Dayton, Nevada), by a company of Mormon emigrants, one of whom, Abner Blackburn, was their guide. After arriving much too early to cross the Sierra, the wagon train camped on the Carson River in the vicinity of Dayton, to wait for the mountain snow to melt. William Prouse (also spelled Prows) soon found gold along the gravel river banks by panning, but left when the mountains were passable, as they anticipated taking out more gold on reaching California. Orr named the gulch Gold Cañón.

Other emigrants followed, camped in the canyon and went to work at mining. However, when the supply of water in the canyon gave out toward the end of summer, they continued across the mountains to California. The camp had no permanent population until the winter and spring of 1852–53, when about 100 men worked part of the year along the gravel banks of the canyon with rockers, Long Toms and sluices. After nine years, the Gold Canyon placers were producing less, and many miners left for the Mono Lake placers.

The gold from Gold Canyon came from quartz veins, toward the head of the vein, in the vicinity of where Silver City and Gold Hill now stand. As the miners worked their way up the stream, they founded the town of Johntown on a plateau. In 1857, the Johntown miners found gold in Six-Mile Canyon, which is about five miles (8 km) north of Gold Canyon. The heads of both these canyons form the north and south ends of what is now known as the Comstock Lode, defined by the Ophir Discovery and the Gold Hill Discovery. The early placer miners never worked out the location of the placer gold, since the Lode surface structure was "largely worn away and covered with debris from the mountain sides above."

=== Grosh brothers ===
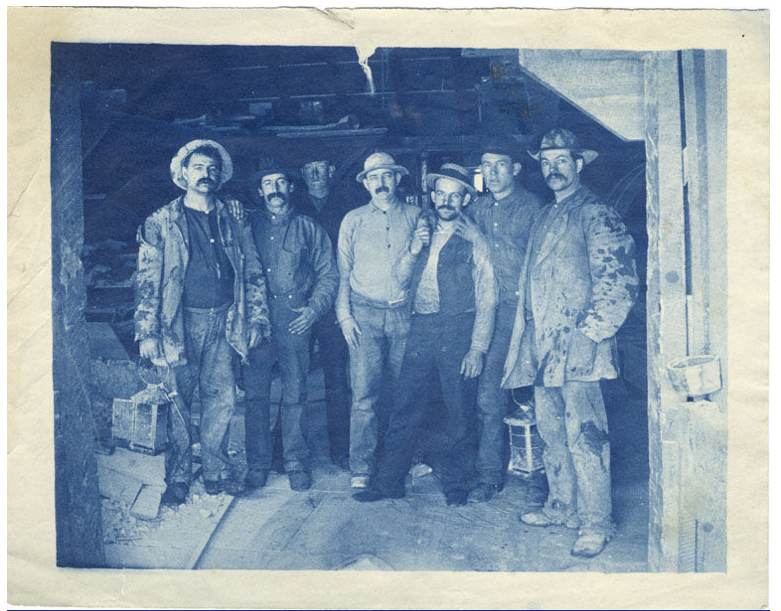
Comstock miners, 1880s. Caption on original: "To Labor is to Pray."

Credit for the discovery of the Comstock Lode is disputed. It is said to have been discovered, in 1857, by Ethan Allen Grosh and Hosea Ballou Grosh, sons of Pennsylvania clergyman Aaron B. Grosh, trained mineralogists and veterans of the California gold fields. Hosea injured his foot and died of sepsis in 1857. In an effort to raise funds, Allen, accompanied by an associate, Richard Maurice Bucke, set out on a trek to California with samples and maps of his claim.

Henry Comstock was left in their stead to care for the Grosh cabin and a locked chest containing silver and gold ore samples and documents of the discovery. Grosh and Bucke never made it to California. They suffered from frostbite while crossing the Sierra Nevada and lost limbs by amputation in a last-ditch effort to save their lives. Grosh died on December 19, 1857. Bucke lived, but upon his recovery returned to his home in Canada.

When Comstock learned of the death of the Grosh brothers, he claimed the cabin and the lands as his own. He also examined the contents of the trunk but thought nothing of the documents as he was not an educated man. What he did know is that the gold and the silver ore samples were from the same vein. He continued to seek out diggings of local miners working in the area, as he knew the Grosh brothers' find was still unclaimed. Upon learning of a strike on Gold Hill which uncovered some bluish rock (silver ore), Comstock immediately filed for an unclaimed tract directly adjacent to this area.

=== Gold Hill discovery ===
Four miners discovered the Gold Hill outcropping, at the head of Gold Canyon, making placer claims after finding traces of gold on January 28, 1859. They were James Finney ("Old Virginny"; a contemporary rumor was that he changed his name from Fennimore to Finney after murdering a man), John Bishop ("Big French John"), Aleck Henderson, and Jack Yount.

These claims were followed by claims from Lemuel S. "Sandy" Bowers (see Bowers Mansion), Joseph Plato, Henry Comstock, James Rogers, and William Knight. In the spring of 1859, after digging down to a depth of about ten feet, they found a gold-rich reddish quartz vein. Their discovery was actually part of the Comstock Lode, the Old Red Ledge. The four men are therefore credited with the rediscovery of the mine previously found by the Grosh brothers.

=== Ophir discovery ===
In the spring of 1859, two miners, Peter O'Riley and Patrick McLaughlin, finding all the paying ground already claimed, went to the head of Six Mile Canyon and began prospecting with a rocker on the slope of the mountain near a small stream fed from a neighboring spring. They had poor results in the top dirt as there was no washed gravel, and they were about to abandon their claim when they made the great discovery.

They sank a small, deeper pit in which to collect water to use in their rockers. In the bottom of this hole was a "layer of rich black sand", "concentrate from the top of the hidden Ophir bonanza". Henry T. P. Comstock learned of the two men working on land that he allegedly had already claimed for "grazing purposes". Unhappy with his current claim on Gold Hill, Comstock made threats and managed to work himself and his partner, Immanuel "Manny" Penrod, into a deal that granted them interest on the claim.

On June 12, a trench they were digging exposed black manganese sand mixed with bluish-gray quartz and gold. Two arrastras built by John D. Winters and J. A. Osborn made them additional partners on June 22. Comstock and Penrod made an additional claim, called the "Mexican", but later called the "Spanish", adjacent to the "Ophir" claim.

With the "blue stuff" found in this trench, silver mining in America was born. In the rocker, along with the gold, was a large quantity of heavy blue-black material almost like putty that clogged the rocker and interfered with the washing out of the fine gold. When assayed on June 27, it was determined to be a rich sulfide of silver; in fact, the ore was three fourths silver to one fourth gold.

The geographic accounts on the location of the Comstock Lode were muddled and inconsistent. In one report, the gold strike was "on the Eastern fork of Walker's river" and the silver strike "about halfway up the Eastern slope of the Sierra Nevada" and "nine miles West of Carson River."

=== Fate of the discoverers ===
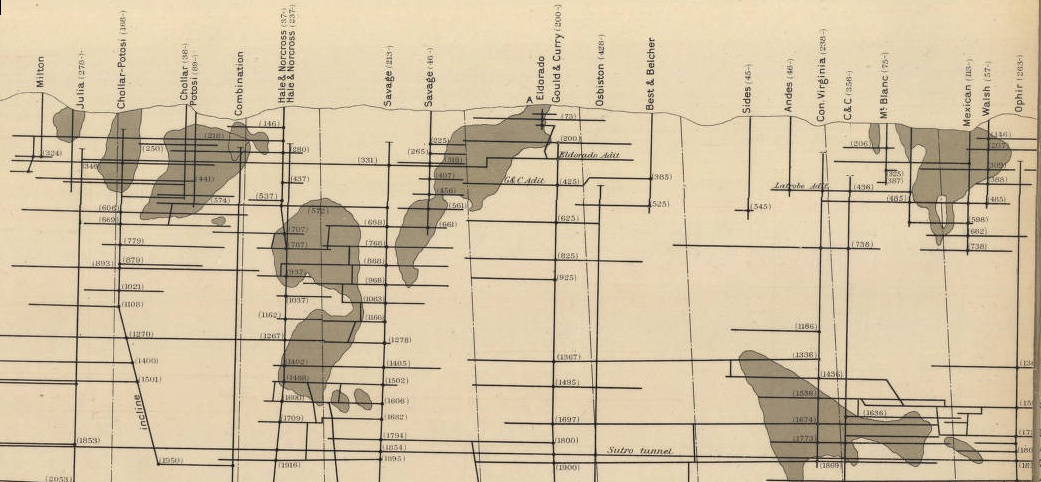
North Comstock Lode ore bodies and claims: south (left) to north (right), Potosi, Chollar, Hale & Norcross, Savage, Gould & Curry, Best & Belcher, Con. Virginia, California, Ophir, Mexican, Union and Sierra Nevada, the last three not depicted

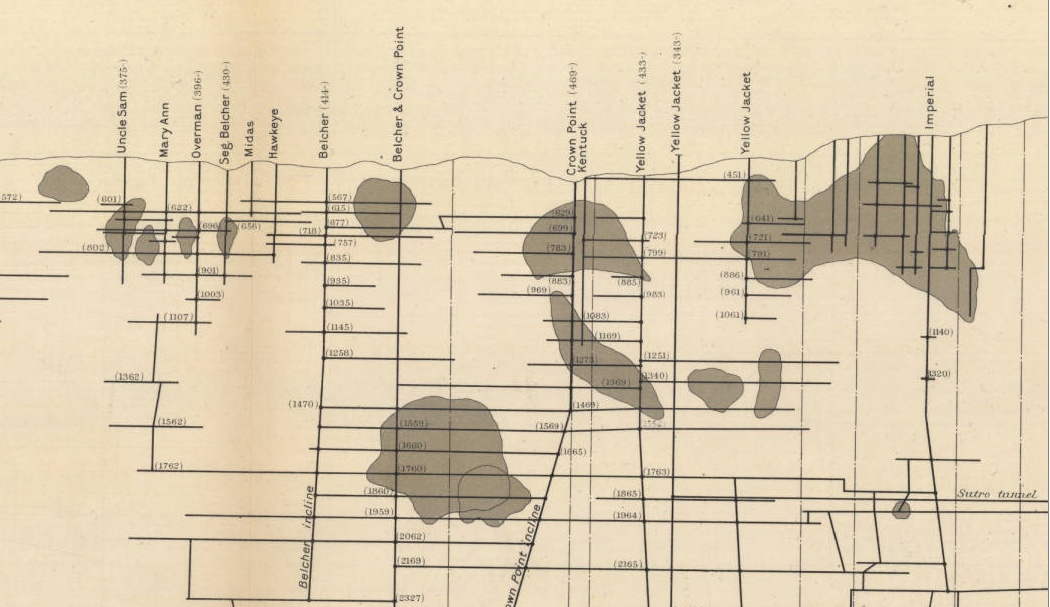
South Comstock Lode ore bodies and claims: south (left) to north (right): Caledonia, Overman, Belcher, Crown Point, Kentuck, Yellow Jacket, Challenge Confidence, Imperial, Alpha, Exchequer, and Bullion Ward, the last not depicted

The miners who discovered the mines, and the investors who bought their claims, did not know whether they had made a small or large strike. The size, richness, and cost of exploiting a buried ore body is very hard to estimate even today. Most of them assumed they had made a small to modest strike like nearly all other gold strikes.

All of them knew they did not have the money or expertise to investigate the strike thoroughly. The size of the strike and its potential value would take many years of extensive work by thousands of miners and the investments of millions of dollars—which none of them had. "Weighing the chances of gain and loss as they stood in 1859 the prospectors had no cause to reproach themselves with lack of foresight."

Patrick McLaughlin sold his 1/6 interest in the Ophir claim for $3,000 to George Hearst. McLaughlin soon lost the money. He then worked as a cook at the Green mine in California. He died working odd jobs.

Emanuel Penrod, partner to Henry Comstock, sold his 1/6 share of the Ophir mine for $5,500 to Judge James Walsh, and his half interest in the "Spanish" mine for $3,000, for a total of $8,500.

J. A. Osborn sold his 1/6 of the Ophir "for a good price".

Peter O'Riley held on to his Ophir interests collecting dividends, until selling for about $40,000. He erected a stone hotel on B Street in Virginia City called the Virginia House, and became a dealer of mining stocks. He began having visions and began a tunnel into the Sierras near Genoa, Nevada (an area of no known mineralization), expecting to strike a richer vein than the Comstock. He eventually lost everything, was declared insane, and died in a private asylum in Woodbridge, California.

Henry Comstock traded an old blind horse and a bottle of whiskey for a one-tenth share of the spring at Ophir, formerly owned by James Fennimore ("Old Virginny"), but later sold all of his Ophir holdings to Judge James Walsh for $11,000. Comstock also sold his half of the "Spanish" mine for $5,500. He opened trade good stores in Carson City and Silver City. Being reportedly slow mentally, having no education and no business experience, he went broke. After losing nearly all his property and possessions in Nevada, Comstock prospected for some years in Idaho and Montana without success. In September 1870, while in Bozeman, Montana, he died of a gunshot wound, believed to be a suicide.

== Innovations and development ==
=== Mining ===
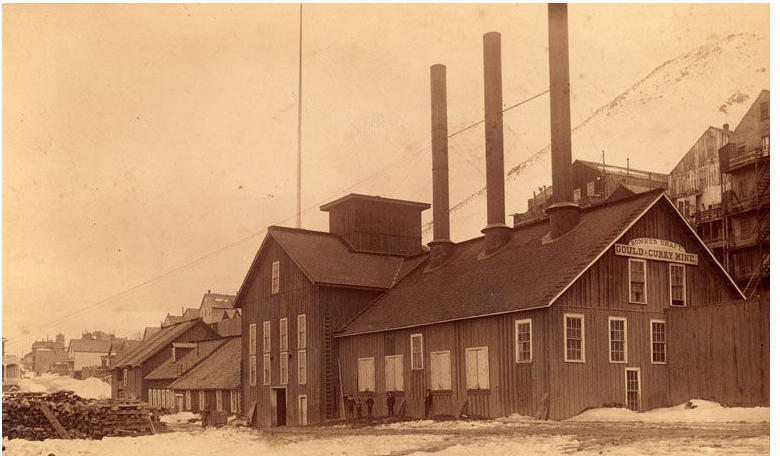
Bonner Shaft, Gould & Curry Mine, 1874

The ore was first extracted through surface diggings, but these were quickly exhausted and miners had to tunnel underground to reach ore bodies. Unlike most silver ore deposits, which occur in long thin veins, those of the Comstock Lode occurred in discrete masses often hundreds of feet thick. Sometimes, the ore was so soft it could be removed by shovel. Although this allowed the ore to be easily excavated, the weakness of the surrounding rock resulted in frequent and deadly cave-ins. The excavations were carried to depths of more than 3,200 feet (1,000 m) (eventually, after years of work).

The cave-in problem was solved by the method of square set timbering invented by Philip Deidesheimer, a German mining engineer from San Francisco, who had been requested to survey the problem by the owners of the Ophir Mine. Previously, timber sets consisting of vertical members on either side of the diggings (ribs) capped by a third horizontal member to support the back (roof), creating a tunnel (drift). However, the Comstock ore bodies were not veins, but sporadic pockets too large for this method. Instead, as ore was removed it was replaced by timbers set as a cube six feet on a side (ribs), front (face) or top (back), all at the same time. Thus, the ore body would be progressively replaced with a timber lattice. Often these voids (stopes) would be re-filled with waste rock from other diggings after ore removal was complete. By this method of building up squares of framed timbers, an ore body of any width may be safely worked to any height or depth. Deidesheimer was appointed to the Ophir as mine manager for his ingenious idea.

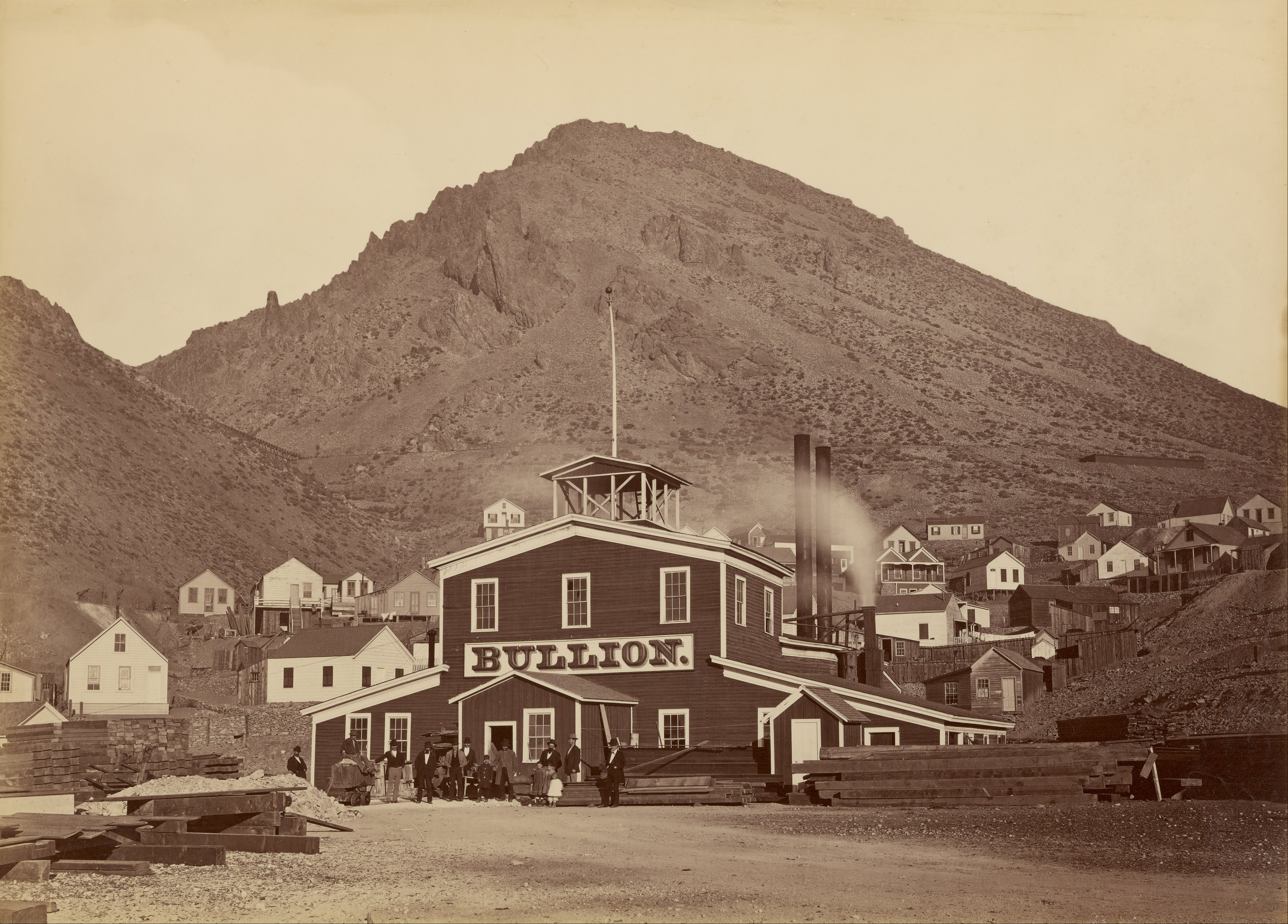
Bullion Mine, Virginia City, Nevada c. 1875–77

Early in the history of Comstock mining, there were heavy flows of water to contend with. This called for pumping machinery and apparatus, and as greater depth was attained, larger pumps were demanded. All the inventive genius of the Pacific Coast was called into play, and this resulted in construction of some of the most powerful and effective steam and hydraulic pumping equipment to be found anywhere in the world. Initially, the water was cold, but the deeper workings cut into parts of the mountain where there were heavy flows of hot water (mines do not always work in digging ore. Some parts of a mining operation could be deepening the existing shaft, or exploring for more ore bodies). This water was hot enough to cook an egg or scald a man to death almost instantly. Lives were lost by falling into sumps of this water, which was heated by geothermal pockets. The hot water called for fans, blowers and various kinds of ventilation apparatus, as miners working in heated drifts had to have a supply of cool air.

Compressed air for running power drills and for driving fans and small hoisting engines was adopted in the Comstock mines. Diamond drills for drilling long distances through solid rock were also in general use, but were discarded for prospecting purposes, being found unreliable. Several new forms of explosives for blasting were also developed.

Great improvements were also made in the hoisting apparatus and cages used to extract ore and transport the miners to their work. As the depth of the diggings increased, the hemp ropes used to haul ore to the surface became impractical, as their self-weight became a significant fraction of their tensile strength (breaking weight). After hemp rope, iron chains began to become more common. However, fracture was quick, at around half a millisecond. In 1829 Wilhelm Albert had studied and reported on the failure of the iron chains and began creating a twisted metal cabling known as Albert Rope. In 1864 Andrew Smith Hallidie manufactured wire rope and was heavily involved in building early cable bridges and ropeway conveyors; his wire rope went on to be used in San Francisco's famous cable cars, and was also added to the cable drums in the hoist houses on the Comstock Lode. Another innovation was spring loaded cages. The only way in and out of a shaft mine was in the cage, cabled to the hoist.

All products, men and supplies, as well as recoverable ore, travels up and down the shaft in a cage. When the hemp rope or chains broke, the cage would plummet uncontrolled to the bottom of the shaft, killing its occupants or destroying its load. Cages were open to the front and rear, with I-beams on both sides to support the floor. The outside of the I-beams slid through wooden guides up and down the shaft, top to bottom. Spring loaded cages were designed with two swivel rods at the top of the cage, one each attached to the I-beams through bolts and lifted in the center. The outside of the rods were designed to be wider than the cage with a bulbous, round head at the end, notched with teeth molded into the rods. The weight of the cage being lifted, lifted the rods, released the teeth and tightened the spring, allowing the cage to move freely. If the chain or cable broke, the springs would force the rods down and the teeth would dig into the wood, stopping the cage.

=== Processing ===
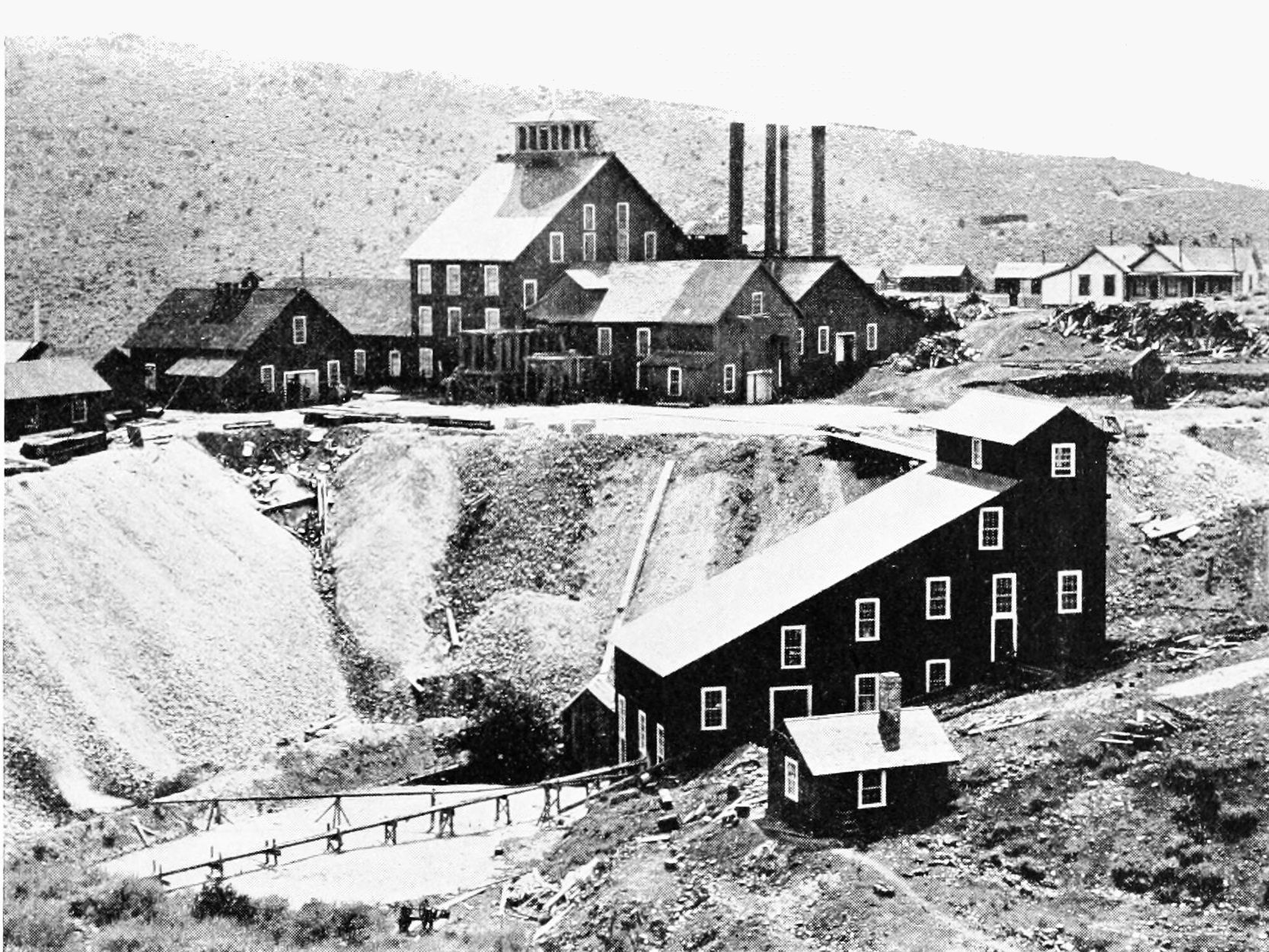
Alta Mine mill, c. 1896

In 1859 the Americans knew nothing about silver mining. John D. Winters Jr., and J.A. Osborn built two arastras, for the patio process, at the Ophir claim, and Gabriel Maldonado, a Mexican of Spanish descent, "began to smelt some of his rich ore in little adobe furnaces, Mexican fashion", after purchasing Penrod's share of the "Mexican" mine. These methods proved to be too slow for the Americans and could not process the quantities of ore being extracted. The Americans introduced stamp mills for crushing the ore, and pans to hasten the process of amalgamation. Some of the German miners, who had been educated at the mining academy of Freiberg, were regarded as the best then existing to work with argentiferous ores.

Bagley introduced a variation of the Freiberg process, using the revolving barrel process of amalgamation, and chloridizing-roasting of ores, after the stamp dry-crushed. While the barrel process was an improvement on the patio, it was found not to be well adapted to the rapid working of the Comstock ores as pan amalgamation. The Comstock eventually developed the Washoe process of using steam-heated iron pans, which reduced the weeks required by the patio process to hours.

In the early days of pan processing of ores, there were tremendous losses in precious metals and quicksilver (mercury). Almost every millman was experimenting with some secret process for the amalgamation of ore. They tried all manner of trash, both mineral and vegetable, including concoctions of cedar bark and sagebrush tea. At that time, untold millions in gold, silver and quicksilver were swept away into the rivers with the tailings. The Carson river and the Lake Lahontan Reservoir carry warnings against mercury. Although many patterns and forms of amalgamating pans were invented and patented, there was much room for improvement. Improvements were made from time to time, resulting in reductions in losses of metals, but none of the apparatus in use on the Comstock was perfect.

== Support infrastructure ==
=== Transportation ===
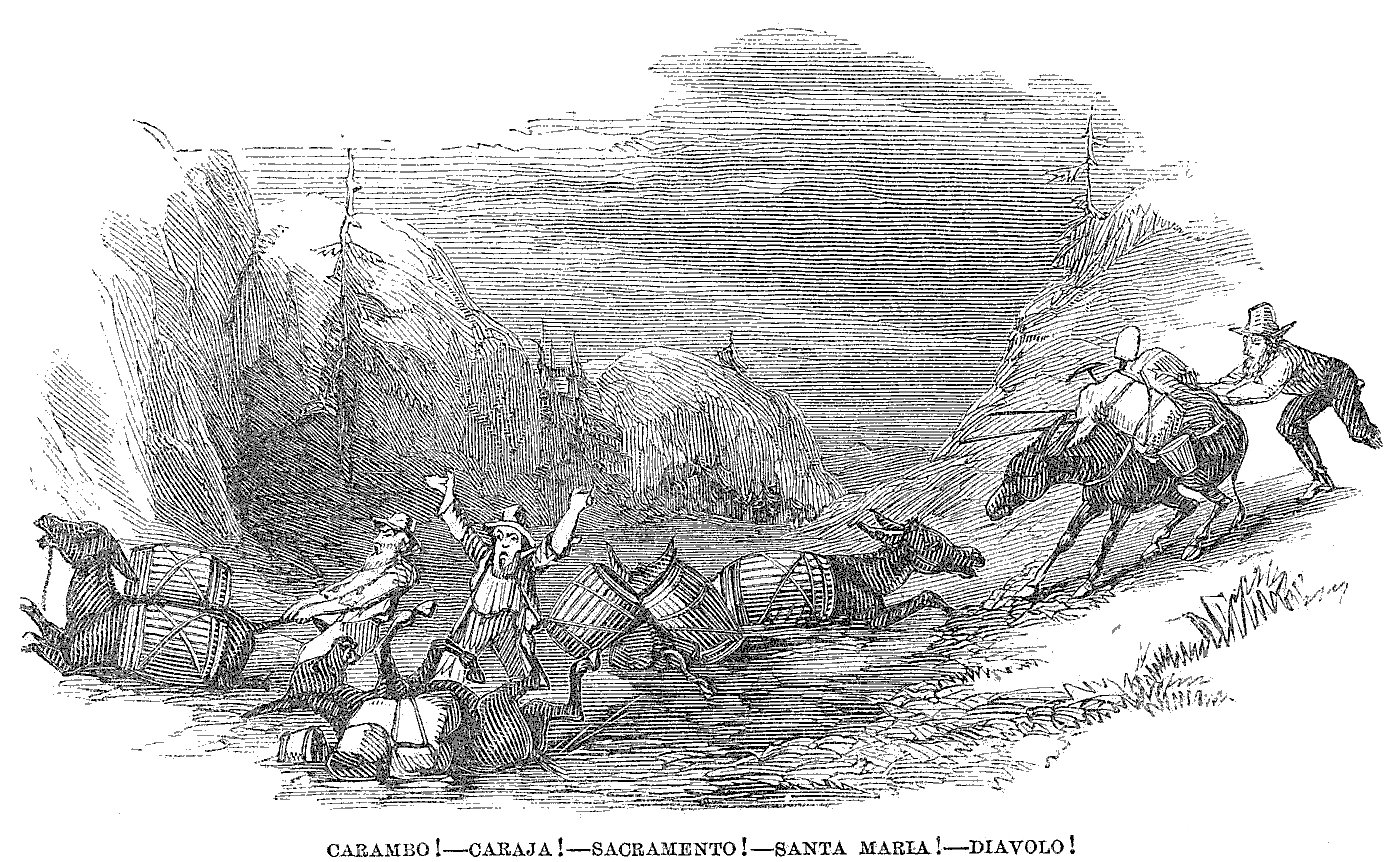
"Carambo!—Caraja!—Sacramento!—Santa Maria!—Diavolo!": the difficult trek by mule train from California (1860 illustration from Harper's)

Before railroads were built, all freight and passengers were transported by teams of from 10 to 16 horses or mules. Ore was hauled to the mills by these teams, which also brought to the mines all the lumber required for construction among other things. Dan DeQuille observed in 1876, "the Comstock Lode may truthfully be said to be the tomb of the forests of the Sierra." It is estimated eighty million feet of timber and lumber annually were consumed in the Comstock. Lumber and cord wood were harvested with little regard for impact, for housing, commercial building, heating, and steam boilers at sawmills and ore mills. Teams also hauled over the Sierra all the mining machinery, all supplies required by both mines and mills, as well as goods and merchandise needed by the stores and businesses. Each team hauled trains of two to four wagon loads. When the large reduction works of the Ophir Mining Company were in peak operation, lines of teams from one to three miles (5 km) in length moved along the wagon roads, and sometimes blocked Virginia City streets for hours.

From 1859 to 1868, great quantities of goods were transported across the Sierra to and from California on the backs of mules. When the Central Pacific Railroad line was completed to the Truckee Meadows, this hauling was bi-directional from Reno to Virginia City via the Geiger Grade wagon road, for transfer to rail for delivery to points east and west.

Ground was broken on the Virginia and Truckee Railroad on February 18, 1869, and by January 28, 1870, the most difficult "crookedest" section from Virginia City to Carson City was completed. Rails were extended north across the Washoe Valley, from Carson City to Reno, where it connected with the Central Pacific. Between Virginia City and Carson City, at Mound House, the railroad also connected with the Carson and Colorado Railroad.

=== The Virginia and Gold Hill Water Company ===
When silver was first discovered on the Comstock, the flow of water from natural springs was adequate to supply the needs of the miners and small towns of Virginia City and Gold Hill, Nevada. As population increased, wells were dug for domestic needs, and the water in several mine tunnels was added to the available supply. As the mills and hoisting works multiplied, the demand for water for use in steam boilers became so great that it was impossible to supply it without creating a water shortage among the residents, now thousands in number. In this need, the Virginia and Gold Hill Water Company was formed, being the first non-mining incorporation on the Comstock Lode.

Water from wells and tunnels in the surrounding mountains was soon exhausted. It became imperative to look toward the main range of the Sierra Nevada mountains, where there was an inexhaustible supply. Between the Sierra and the Virginia ranges lay the Washoe Valley, a great trough nearly 2,000 ft (610 m) in depth. Hermann Schussler, a German and Swiss-trained engineer of great repute who had planned and designed waterworks in San Francisco, was brought to the Comstock to plan and design the new works. Surveys were made in 1872, and the first sections of pipe laid June 11, 1873, and the last on July 25 the same year.

The initial pipe was made of wrought iron and had a total length of over 7 mi (11 km), with an interior diameter of 12 in (300 mm) and a capacity of 2.2 million gallons per day (gpd), or 1,500 gallons per minute (gpm). The pipe traversed the Washoe Valley in the form of an inverted siphon, at the lowest point having a pressure of 1,870 ft (570 m) of water, or 810 pounds per square inch (psi) at the design flow. The inlet being 477 ft (145 m) above the outlet, the water was forced through the pipe at tremendous pressure. Water was brought to the inlet in the Sierra Nevada range from sources of supply in two large covered flumes, and at the outlet end of the pipe was delivered in two large flumes a distance of 12 mi (19 km) to Gold Hill and Virginia City. The pipe was constructed of sheets of wrought iron riveted together, each section fastened with three rows of rivets. Lead was used to seal the joints between pipe sections. The first flow of water reached Gold Hill and Virginia City on August 1, 1873, with great fanfare. This accomplishment was the highest pressure water system in operation in the world, having superseded the water system at Cherokee Flat also designed by Schussler.

The water company laid an additional pipe alongside the first in 1875 and a third pipe in 1877. These pipes with lap-welded joints delivered more water, there being less friction of rivet heads on the water. Additional flumes were also constructed to diversify and improve reliability of supply.

Portions of this water system, now called the Marlette Lake Water System, are still in use today, feeding Virginia City with fresh water.

=== Sutro Tunnel ===
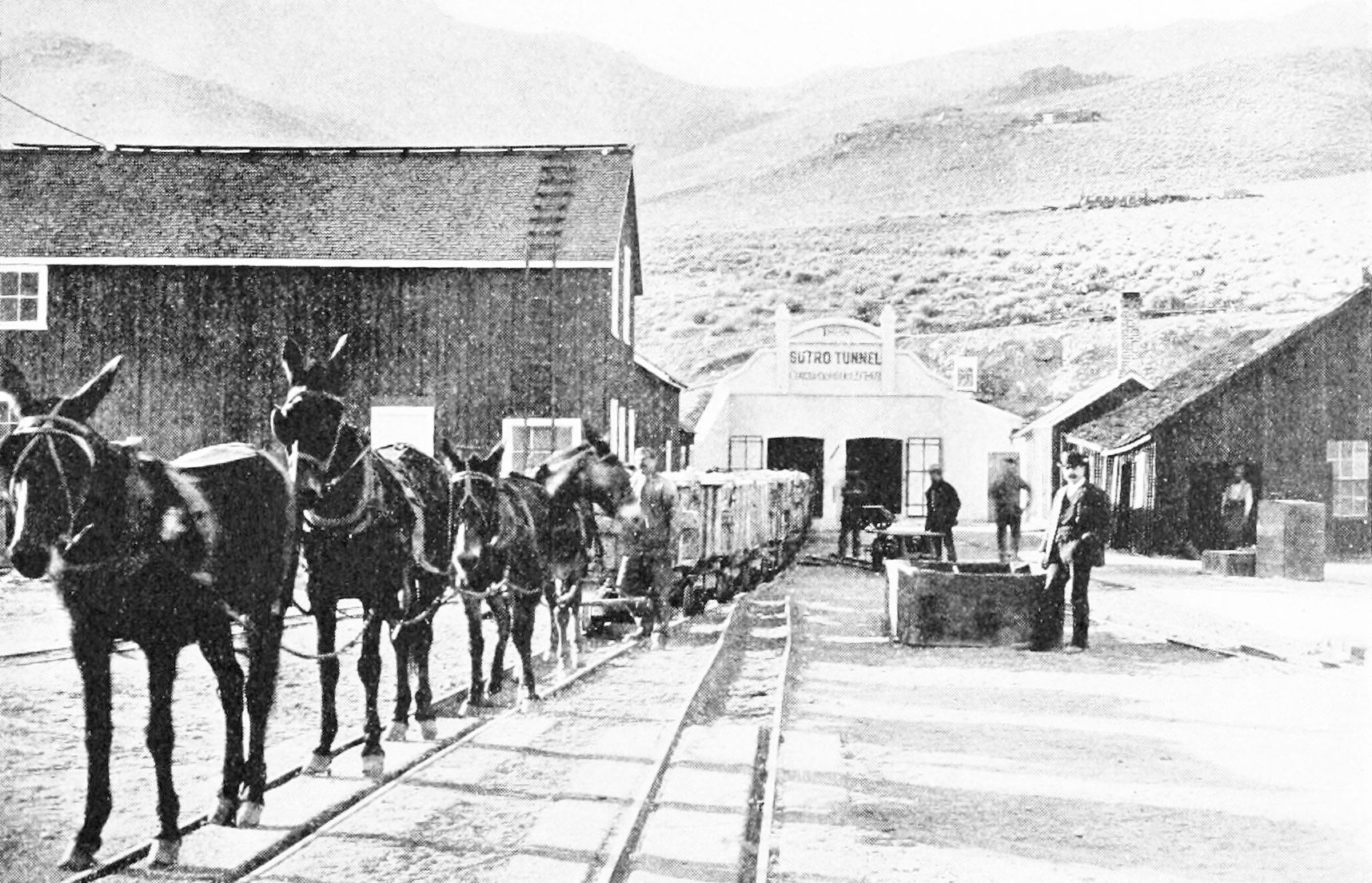
Sutro Tunnel, c. 1896

While there was a scarcity of water on the surface, there was an excess of water underground in all the mines. Floods in the mines were sudden and miners narrowly escaped being drowned by vast underground reservoirs that were unexpectedly tapped. Intrusion of scalding-hot water into the mines was a large problem, and the expense of water removal increased as depths increased. To overcome these troubles, Adolph Sutro conceived the idea of running a drain tunnel under the Comstock Lode from the lowest possible point. A survey was made by Schussler and work commenced in October 1869.

The Sutro Tunnel was completed from the valley near Dayton through nearly four miles, 20,589 feet, of solid rock to meet the Comstock mines approximately 1,750 ft (530 m) beneath the surface. Two drain laterals were dug, the north one 4,403 feet long and the south one 8,423 feet long. The tunnel was 9.5 ft (2.9 m) wide and 7.5 ft (2.3 m) high, inside the timbering. Drain flumes were sunk in the floor and over these were two tracks for horse carts. It required eight and a half years to reach the Lode. The tunnel drained up to 4,000,000 gallons daily.

The tunnel provided drainage and ventilation for the mines as well as gravity-assisted ore removal. However, by the time the tunnel reached the Comstock area mines, most of the ore above 1,650 ft (500 m) had already been removed and the lower workings were 1,500 ft (460 m) deeper still. Although virtually no ore was removed through the tunnel, the drainage it provided greatly decreased the operating costs of the mines served. The ventilation problems were solved at about the same time by compressed air for the use of pneumatic drills.

The tunnel connected with the Savage claim on July 8, 1878. All of the Gold Hill mines stopped pumping water by March 1882, and water was allowed to rise to the level of the tunnel. The Combination Shaft ceased pumping below the tunnel on October 16, 1886.

== Yellow Jacket Mine fire ==
On the morning of April 7, 1869, a fire spread at the 800-foot level in the Yellow Jacket Mine. Firefighters entered the mine but the smoke and flames pushed them back. As the fire burned, wood timbers collapsed and poisonous gases expanded into the adjacent Kentucky and Crown Point mines. The fires persisted and mine sections were sealed off and remained hot for several years. At least 35 miners died, and some bodies were never retrieved. The Yellow Jacket Mine fire was the worst mining accident in Nevada history up to that time.

== Later years ==
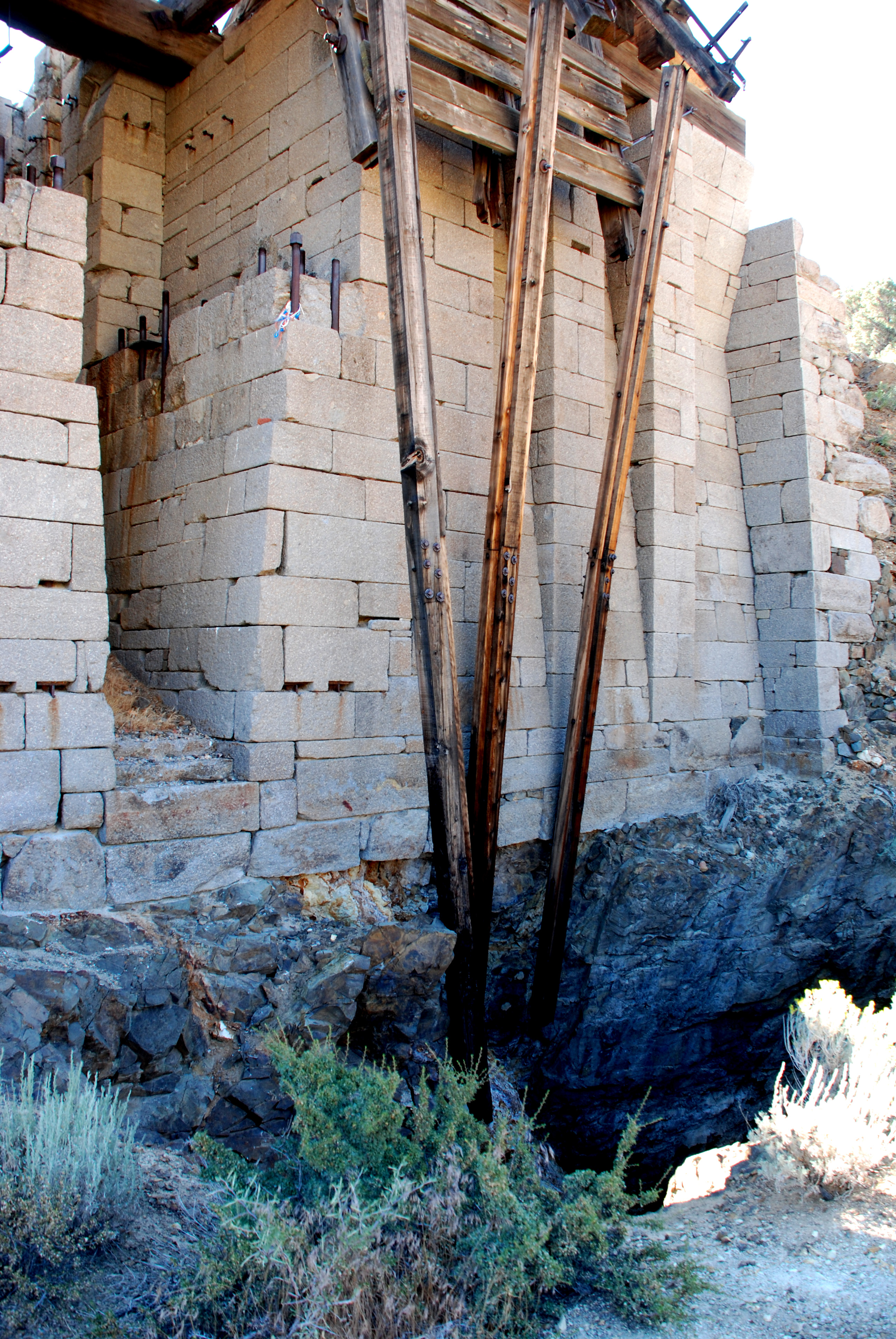
Remains of the Combination Shaft, 2011. The Combination Shaft, located near Virginia City, began in 1875 when the mine owners combined their efforts to sink a shaft to explore the Comstock Lode at a greater depth. The Combination was the deepest shaft ever sunk on the Comstock, reaching a depth of 3,250 feet (990 m). It was used until 1886.

The total production of ore extracted and milled in the Comstock District, 1860 to June 30, 1880, was 6,971,641 tons, 640 pounds. Peak production from the Comstock occurred in 1877, with the mines producing over $14,000,000 of gold and $21,000,000 of silver that year (about $423,281,250 and $634,921,875 today).

The greatest depth reached, in 1884, was by the Ophir-Mexican winze at 3,360 ft (1,020 m) below the surface. Production from Comstock mines from 1859 to 1878 was $320,000,000, with a net profit of $55,000,000, most of that in the 1870s. The bonanza period was at an end by 1880.

Deep underground exploration and mining continued sporadically until 1918, when the last of the pumps was shut off, allowing the mines to flood up to the Sutro Tunnel Level (approximately 1,640 feet beneath Virginia City). All mining from 1920 to present has taken place above the Sutro Tunnel level. Meanwhile, through the early years of the 20th century, ownership of mineral rights along the length of the Comstock Lode was consolidated primarily into a handful of companies, most of them privately held. This structure was a departure from that of the late 1800s, when upwards of 400 mining companies operated on the Comstock, with at least 150 of them publicly traded.

Comstock's silver mines were criticized for the way that their share prices were manipulated on the San Francisco stock exchanges, and for the way that insiders skimmed the profits to the detriment of the common shareholders. Insiders used rumors or assessments to drive share prices down, buy up the cheap shares, then spread rumors of large new silver finds to increase prices once more so that they could sell their shares at a profit. Mining company managers also issued contracts to themselves for timber, and water. Ore from the mines was commonly processed by ore mills owned by the company insiders, who were accused of keeping part of the silver they extracted for themselves and refusing to make an accounting.

In 1920, the United Comstock Mines Company was organized by prominent Comstock mining engineers Roy Hardy and Alex Wise with financial backing by New York businessman Harry Payne Whitney. United Comstock consolidated ownership of the entire Gold Hill section of the Comstock Lode, representing 5,000 feet of strike length and a mill site in American Flat. This enterprise constructed the 2,500 ton-per-day capacity American Flat cyanide mill, the largest in the world at the time, and drove a tunnel 9,585 feet from the mill under Gold Hill. The economics of this project were tenuous, and with a drop in silver prices, it closed in 1924.

In 1934, the federal government raised the price of gold from $20.67 to $35 per ounce, which vastly improved the economics of projects on the Comstock. Several companies embarked on substantial projects, including:

- Arizona Comstock Company in 1933 began underground mining through the Hale & Norcross tunnel, followed quickly by a surface mine known as the Loring Cut and located across from the Fourth Ward School. Arizona Comstock processed its ore at a 330-ton-per-day flotation plant located near the Hale & Norcross portal, but the flotation method alone turned out to be relatively ineffective at recovering Comstock gold and silver and this operation shut down by 1938.
- Dayton Consolidated The Dayton Consolidated Mill in Silver City processed ore from its own mine, as well as operating as a "custom" mill for a number of mines in the area.
- Con Chollar The Con Chollar Mining Company built a 135 ton-per-day flotation mill near the south end of Gold Hill to re-process tailings from several nearby mines. It later processed ore from the Overman Pit in the same section of the Lode.
- Sutro Tunnel Coalition/Crown Point Mill After several years of exploration and development on the Crown Point claim in Gold Hill, the Sutro Tunnel Coalition built a 100 ton-per-day cyanide mill to process both underground and surface mined ore in 1935. The mill and mine development was accomplished with a $160,000 loan from the Reconstruction Finance Corporation, which was paid back in under 3 years of operation. The Crown Point Mill operated profitably, treating primarily ores from the Crown Point and Yellow Jacket claims, until it was shut down by War Production Board Order L-208 in 1942.

Exploration and production on varying scales and in varying locations have been undertaken on the Comstock Lode in every decade since its discovery. There was a particular flurry of activity, including major surface mining operations by the Houston Oil and Mineral Company followed by United Mining in the late 1970s and early 1980s. This activity paralleled a rapid and substantial rise in the price of gold and silver, which was unpegged from the dollar by President Nixon in 1971.

Today, the Comstock Lode is being explored by Comstock Mining Inc. of Virginia City, Nevada, which has consolidated control of approximately 70% of Comstock mining claims. On September 30, 2012, Comstock Mining Inc. returned gold and silver production to the Comstock with its first pour of doré bullion and continues surface mining in lower Gold Hill.

== Legacy ==
Nevada is commonly called the "Silver State" because of the silver produced from the Comstock Lode. However, since 1878, Nevada has been a relatively minor silver producer, with most subsequent bonanzas consisting of more gold than silver. In 1900, Jim Butler discovered Nevada's second largest silver strike in Tonopah, Nevada. Nevada is currently ranked as the second largest producer of silver in the United States. Nevada's leading silver producer is the Rochester Mine in Pershing County. This mine ranks behind the Greens Creek mine in Alaska, the largest producer of silver in the US.

According to Dan De Quille, a journalist of the period, "the discovery of silver undoubtedly deserves to rank in merit above the discovery of the gold mines of California, as it gives value to a much greater area of territory and furnishes employment to a much larger number of people".

The latter quarter of the nineteenth century and first decade of the twentieth employed miners and mining technology invented on the Comstock, throughout various other mining camps in the west. Deep underground, hard rock mining was a constantly evolving development for the miners and their companies, and the tactics developed on the Comstock became famous within the mining industry, worldwide.

Two U.S. Navy ships have been named for the Comstock Lode. The first was the USS Comstock (LSD-19) which was launched in 1945 and the second is the USS Comstock (LSD-45) which was launched in 1988.

=== Fortunes made ===
Four Irishmen, John William Mackay, James Graham Fair, James C. Flood and William S. O'Brien formed a business partnership in 1869 known as the "Bonanza Firm", which dealt in silver-mining shares, and controlled and ran a number of Comstock mines over the years, notably the Consolidated Virginia Mining Company. These four men were among the "Bonanza Kings" or "Silver Kings" of the Comstock.

George Hearst, a highly successful California prospector, became a partner in Hearst, Haggin, Tevis and Co., the largest private mining firm in the United States, which owned and operated the Ophir mine on the Comstock Lode, and other gold and silver mining interests in California, Nevada, Utah, South Dakota and Peru. Hearst was a member of the California State Assembly and became a United States senator from California. George Hearst was the father of the famed newspaperman William Randolph Hearst.

Copper King Marcus Daly, a mining engineer, met Hearst while working for John Mackay and James G. Fair. He later went on to form the Anaconda Mining Company, a Butte, Montana copper corporation.

William Chapman Ralston, founder of the Bank of California, financed several mining operations, repossessed some of those mines as their owners defaulted, and ultimately made enormous profits from the Comstock Lode.

William Sharon, a business partner of Ralston, was the Nevada agent for the Bank of California, and acquired Ralston's assets when his financial empire collapsed. William Sharon became the second United States Senator from Nevada.

William M. Stewart, who abandoned mining to become an attorney in Virginia City, Nevada, participated in mining litigation and the development of mining on the Comstock Lode. As Nevada became a state in 1864, Stewart assisted in developing its constitution, and became the first United States Senator from Nevada, where he helped pass the General Mining Act of 1872.

Silver baron Alvinza Hayward, known in his lifetime as "California's first millionaire", held a large interest in the Comstock lode after 1864.

=== Writers and artists ===
While most who worked the mines did not gain great fortune, a number went on to be notable in their own right in the area of writing.

The Sagebrush School of journalists and writers arose out of the Territorial Enterprise and other newspapers in Virginia City. A young William Wright and Samuel Clemens both tried their hands at mining at Comstock; not prospering at this, they landed jobs at the Territorial Enterprise where they began writing under the pen names Dan De Quille and Mark Twain. The poet and politician John Brayshaw Kaye, also worked in the mine for a short period in the 19th century.

In 1939 the arts section of the Federal Works Agency invited California artist Ejnar Hansen to create a mural for the newly completed post office building in Lovelock, Nevada, as part of the New Deal program. After a visit to the former mining town, Hansen chose the discovery of the lode as a suitable local subject, treating it in the style of modified realism favored by the Agency. Once his canvas was installed over an interior doorway, it was widely admired for its authenticity, especially by miners and prospectors with experience of the desert locale.

== In fiction ==
- L'Amour, Louis (1981). Comstock Lode. Bantam Books. ISBN 978-0-553-27561-2.
- Bonanza season 1, episode 9 (1959), titled "The Henry Comstock Story", recounts a fanciful tale of Mr. Comstock, portraying him as a P. T. Barnum–like conman.
- In Deadwood season 2, various episodes (2005), several characters, including Whitney Ellsworth and Francis Wolcott, are portrayed as knowing one another from "The Comstock". Additionally, the Francis Wolcott character is portrayed as a mineralogist working for George Hearst.

== See also ==
- Silver mining in Nevada

== Bibliography ==
- Bush, Don. "Nevada and the Comstock Lode". 1992. March 10, 2007 <www.vcnevada.com/history.htm>.
- "Comstock Lode". Britannica. Ed. Jacob E. Safra. 15th ed. Vol. 3. London: Encyclopædia Britannica, 1998. 551.
- "Comstock Lode". Encyclopedia Americana. Ed. Wayne Gard. International ed. Vol. 7. Richmond: Grolier Incorporated Inc., 1988. 494.
- "Comstock Lode". Grolier Online Encyclopedia. Ed. Elliott West. Washington, 1997.
- "Comstock Lode". World Book. Ed. Stephan A. Erickson. Vol. 4. Chicago: World Book, Inc., 1988. 926.
- Gregory Crouch (2018). The Bonanza King: John Mackay and the Battle over the Greatest Riches in the American West. Scribner.
- Edward S. Barnard. The Gold Rush in America. New York: The Reader's Digest Association Inc., 1977.
- Highfill, John. The U. S. Silver Dollar Encyclopedia. 4, 65–66, 73, 86, 143, 640, 920.
- Kyle, Stacy. The Gold Rush in America. London: Troll Association Inc., 1998.
- Lord, Eliot (1883). Comstock Mining and Miners. Washington, D.C.: U.S. Department of the Interior: United States Geological Survey.
- Church, John A. (1878). The Heat of the Comstock Mines. [for author] (presented at the American Institute of Mining Engineers).
- Wright, William (1876). History of the Big Bonanza. Hartford, Conn.: American Publishing Company.
- "Nevada Historical Markers". Nevada State Historic Preservation Office. Archived from the original on February 4, 2013., Nevada Historical Marker 13
