= Philip Deidesheimer =

American mining engineer (1832–1916)

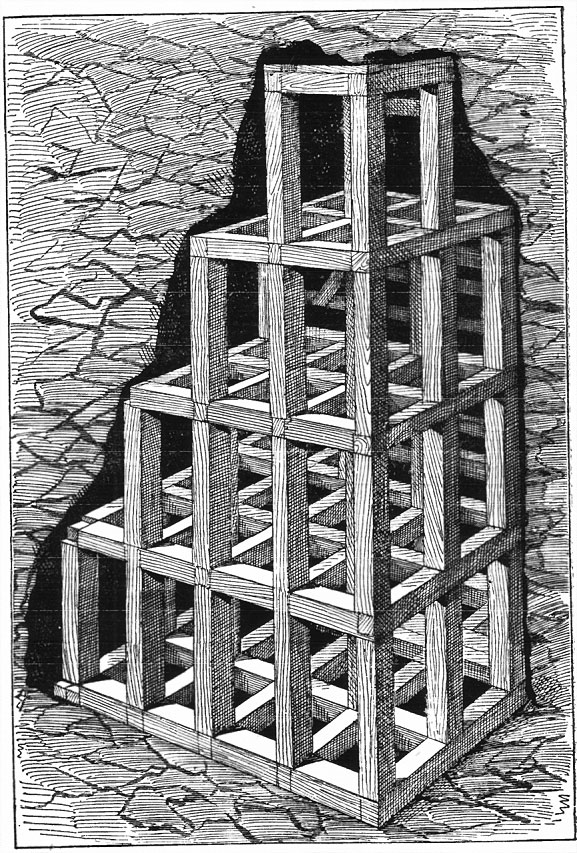
Square set timbering as used in the Comstock mines, 1877 illustration.

Philip Deidesheimer was a mining engineer in the Western United States.

Deidesheimer was born in 1832, in Darmstadt, Electorate of Hesse before German unification. He attended the prestigious Freiberg University of Mining (Technische Universität Bergakademie Freiberg) and emigrated to California in 1852. He died on 21 July 1916 in San Francisco, California.

== Career ==
In 1852, at nineteen, the young mining engineer traveled to the California gold fields to work for several years, including in Georgetown. In April 1860 he was hired by W. F. Babcock, a trustee of the Ophir Mine, part of the Comstock Lode silver mining boom in Nevada, and solved one of the Comstock mines' most critical engineering needs.

=== Comstock Lode ===
==== Square set timbering ====
Deidesheimer invented a system, now known as square set timbering, using heavy timber "cubes" as supports for underground mining tunnels and shafts, that enabled skilled miners to open three-dimensional cavities of any size. In large openings, the cubes could be filled with waste rock, creating a solid pillar of wood and rock from floor to roof ("back" in miner's terminology).

Deidesheimer created the square set timbering system for the Comstock Lode's Ophir Mine in Virginia City, Nevada, in 1860. The system, which was inspired by the structure of honeycombs, enabled mining of the large silver orebodies of the Comstock Lode, which were in very weak rock—in miner's terms, "heavy ground".

Deidesheimer refused to patent the innovation, which was easily the most important mining innovation of 1860.

Ophir Mine

As was common with the Comstock mines, the rock in the Ophir Mine was soft and easily collapsed into the working stopes (cavities where ore is extracted). In addition, the presence of clay that would swell greatly upon exposure to air caused great pressures that the mine timbering of that day could not hold back. The square set timbering method devised by Deideshimer slowed the swelling action long enough for ore extraction, though with time and decay the timbering was crushed by the enormous pressures found in the Comstock mines.

Deidesheimer was made superintendent of the Ophir Mine by mine owner William Sharon in early 1875. He was bankrupted by speculation in mining stocks in 1878.

=== Other mines ===
In 1866 Deidesheimer designed and supervised the construction of the Hope Mill and smelter for the St. Louis and Montana Mining Company, to process silver ore from nearby mines in Granite County, Montana. The town that formed around the Hope Mill was named Philipsburg, in honor of Philip Deidesheimer.

After the decline of the Comstock mines in the late 1870s, Deideshimer continued his successful mining engineer career at the Young America Mine in Sierra City, California, where he was one of the five mine owners made rich over the five years of good production at that mine.

== In media ==
The development of his square-set timbering method was fictionalized in "The Philip Deidesheimer Story", a 1959 first-season episode of the American television series Bonanza, in which John Beal portrayed the title character. Philip Deidesheimer was the subject of the NPR radio program The Engines of Our Ingenuity in episode 1901 and was inducted into the (USA) National Mining Hall of Fame. He makes a small appearance in Louis L'Amour's western novel, Comstock Lode, where he asks the main character to double check his square set timbering mine plan.

== See also ==
- Drift mining
- Shaft mining
