= James Clair Flood =

American businessman

- Engraving by J. A. J. Wilcox, 1882
- Born: October 25, 1826; New York City, U.S.
- Died: February 21, 1889 (aged 62); Heidelberg, German Empire
- Resting place: Cypress Lawn Memorial Park
- Occupations: Carriage builder; carpenter; farmer; saloonkeeper; stockbroker; partner in Comstock Lode mines
- Organization(s): Flood & O'Brien; Consolidated Virginia Mining Company; Bank of Nevada
- Known for: Being one of the "Bonanza Kings"

James Clair Flood (October 25, 1826 – February 21, 1889) was an American businessman who made a fortune from the Comstock Lode in Nevada. His mining operations are recounted to this day as an outstanding example of what may be done with a rich body of ore and a genius for stock manipulation. Flood piled up millions as one of the famed "Bonanza Kings" and is considered to have been one of the 100 wealthiest Americans, leaving an enormous fortune. He is famous for two mansions, the James C. Flood Mansion at 1000 California Street in San Francisco, and Linden Towers, located in Menlo Park, torn down in 1936.

== Biography ==
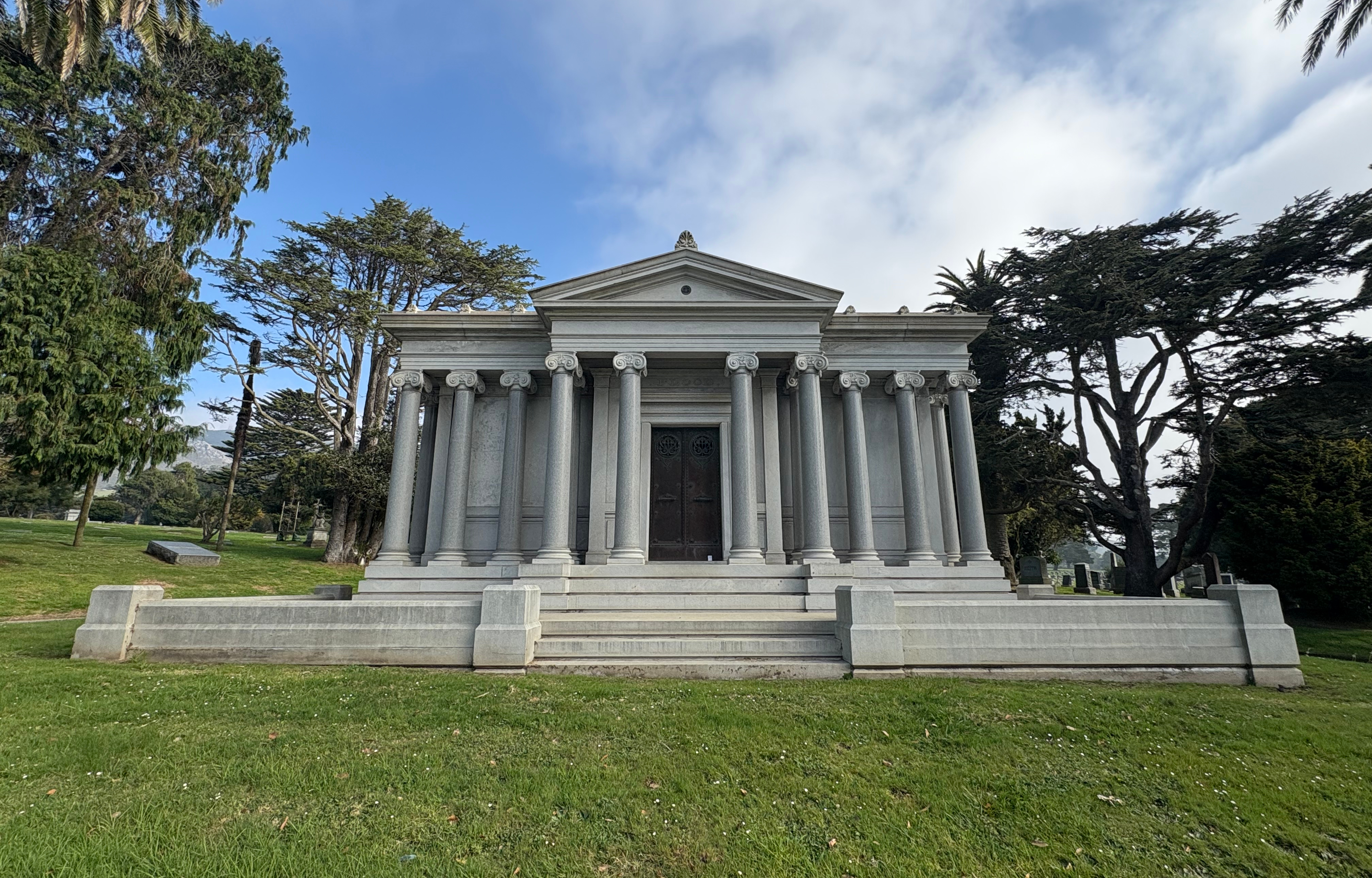
Flood mausoleum at Cypress Lawn Memorial Park

Flood was born on October 25, 1826, in Staten Island, New York, to Irish immigrant parents. He had an eighth-grade education, and was then apprenticed to a New York carriage maker.

In 1849 he sailed for San Francisco and the Gold Rush. After some success in the mines, he returned east to marry Mary Emma Leary from County Wexford, Ireland. They were back in San Francisco by 1854. The Floods had three children: Mary Emma (1853-1866), Cora Jane "Jennie" (1855-1928), who never married, and James Leary (1857-1926).

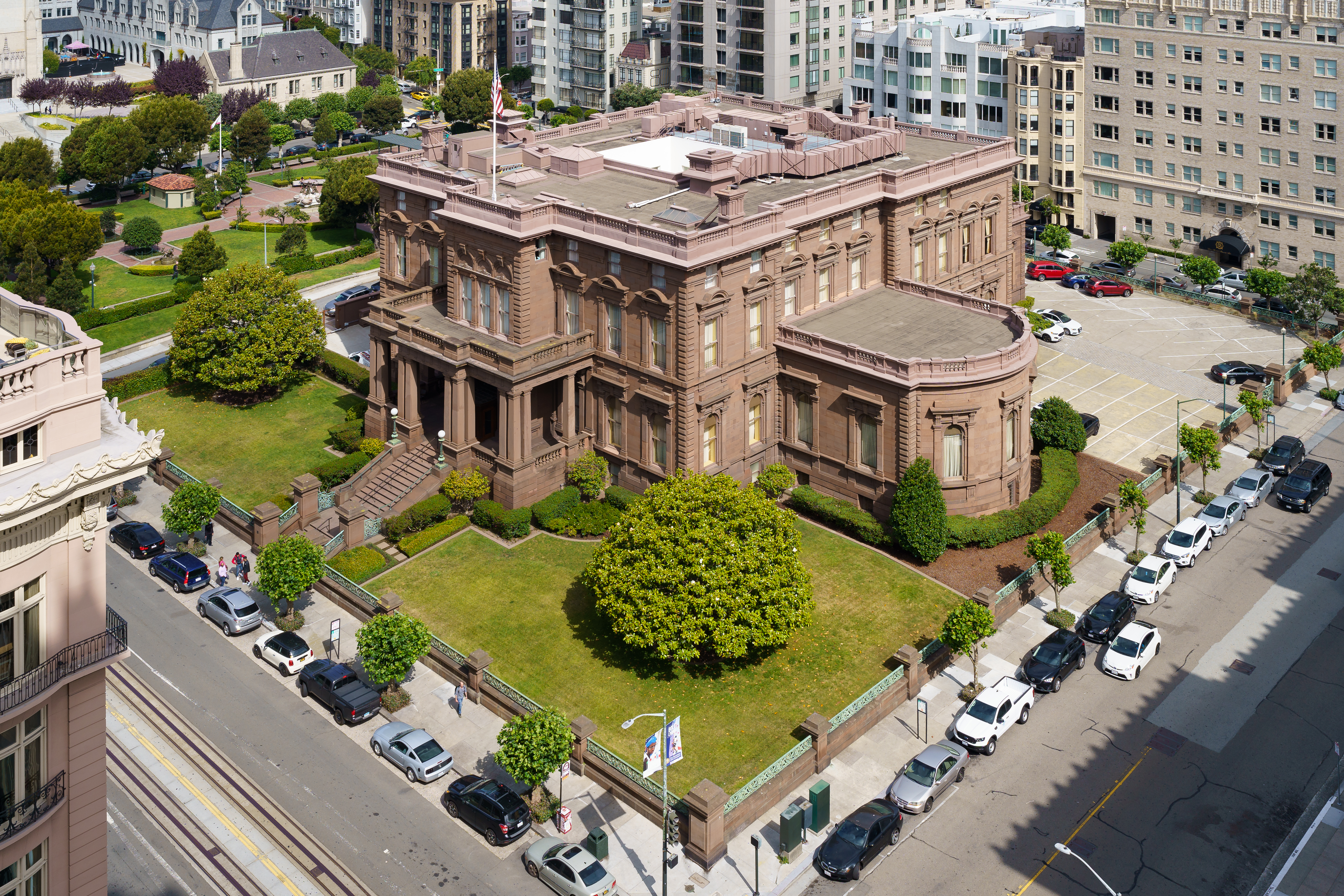
The James C. Flood Mansion at 1000 California Street in San Francisco, California. Built in 1886 as a townhouse for James C. Flood, it is the only Nob Hill mansion to structurally survive the 1906 San Francisco earthquake and fire (its stone walls survived but the interior was gutted). It is owned by the Pacific-Union Club.

James Clair Flood died in Heidelberg on February 21, 1889, and was buried at Cypress Lawn Memorial Park in Colma, California.

James Leary Flood married Marie Rosina "Rose" Fritz, a burlesque dancer (1862-1898). He had three children from his second marriage, to Rose's sister Maud Lee Fritz (1876-1966): Mary Emma Flood (Mrs. Theodore) Stebbins (1900-1987), James L. Flood, Jr. (1902-1907), and James Flood (1908-1990). He was also apparently the father of Constance May Gavin (1893-1950), who was raised in the Flood household during James L. Flood's first marriage and who sued his estate for her inheritance (the family settled with her out of court). As a tribute to his father, James L. Flood built the Flood Building on San Francisco's Market Street; in 2003 the building was still owned by the Flood family.

== Beginning of a fortune ==
In 1857 James C. Flood opened a saloon with partner William S. O'Brien on Washington Street in San Francisco. In 1858 they sold the saloon and went into business as stockbrokers. After the discovery of silver in Nevada in 1859, the partners began investing in mining stocks. The following year, Flood and O'Brien formed a partnership with fellow Irishmen James Graham Fair, a mine superintendent, and John William Mackay, a mining engineer. Mackay and Fair had the mining knowledge and Flood and O'Brien raised the money.

== Stock gambling fever ==
The firm gained control of the Consolidated Virginia Mining Company's stock in 1873, as well as the California Mine. The purchase price of the claims, later to become a fabulous source of wealth, was about $100,000. The original stock issue was 10,700 shares, selling for between $4 and $5 a share. It was in the Consolidated Virginia mine that the greatest silver bonanza in history was discovered shortly afterward. The ore body was more than 1,200 feet deep, which yielded in just one month as much as $632 per ton. A little while after Flood and his partners discovered the "big bonanza," the price of the stock skyrocketed. Flood is traditionally credited with having directed the subsequent proceedings so far as stock market operations were concerned.

San Francisco and the entire mining world were hurtled into a fever of excitement by proof of early reports of the richness of the mining claims. The first stock issue was converted into two issues of 108,000 shares each, and by the middle of 1875 the speculative value of the two mines were close to $1,000,000,000. Shares went as high as $710. It was said that in the first six months of 1875 the output of the mines averaged $1,500,000 monthly. Seats on the San Francisco Stock Exchange Board jumped to $25,000 each as a result of the excitement. Varied interests sought to obtain stock control of the rich properties and there came the inevitable crash in which many were ruined financially.

The "Bonanza Kings" profited, however, and late in 1875 Flood and O'Brien sought to become leaders in finance. After producing $133,471,000, the Consolidated Virginia and California mines could not be operated profitably, but in the language of the street, the owners had "caught them coming and going."

== Nevada Bank ==
The Bonanza firm was said to be held together by Flood, though he was the most unpopular of the partners with the public, and was regarded by some as a stock manipulator. The advent of Flood and O'Brien, operating independently of Fair and Mackay, into the financial field met fierce resistance from William Sharon and William C. Ralston of the Bank of California. As a result of a battle between the two groups, the Bank of California eventually failed and Flood and O'Brien started the Nevada Bank.

From then on finance more than mining engaged Flood's time, and much of his wealth went into real estate. Dissension and an ill-fated attempt to corner the world wheat market in 1887 cost the firm millions. William Alvord, president of the Bank of California, in 1887 warned Flood of irregularities at the Nevada Bank, enabling Flood to avert the latter's collapse following the speculation of its cashier in the wheat market.

== Other investments ==
In 1882, Flood purchased the Rancho Santa Margarita y Las Flores in San Diego County. During World War II, the United States Marine Corps acquired the rancho and it is now known as Camp Pendleton, the Marines' major West Coast base.
