= Parish House (Virginia City, Nevada) =

Historic house in Nevada, United States

- U.S. National Register of Historic Places
- U.S. Historic district – Contributing property
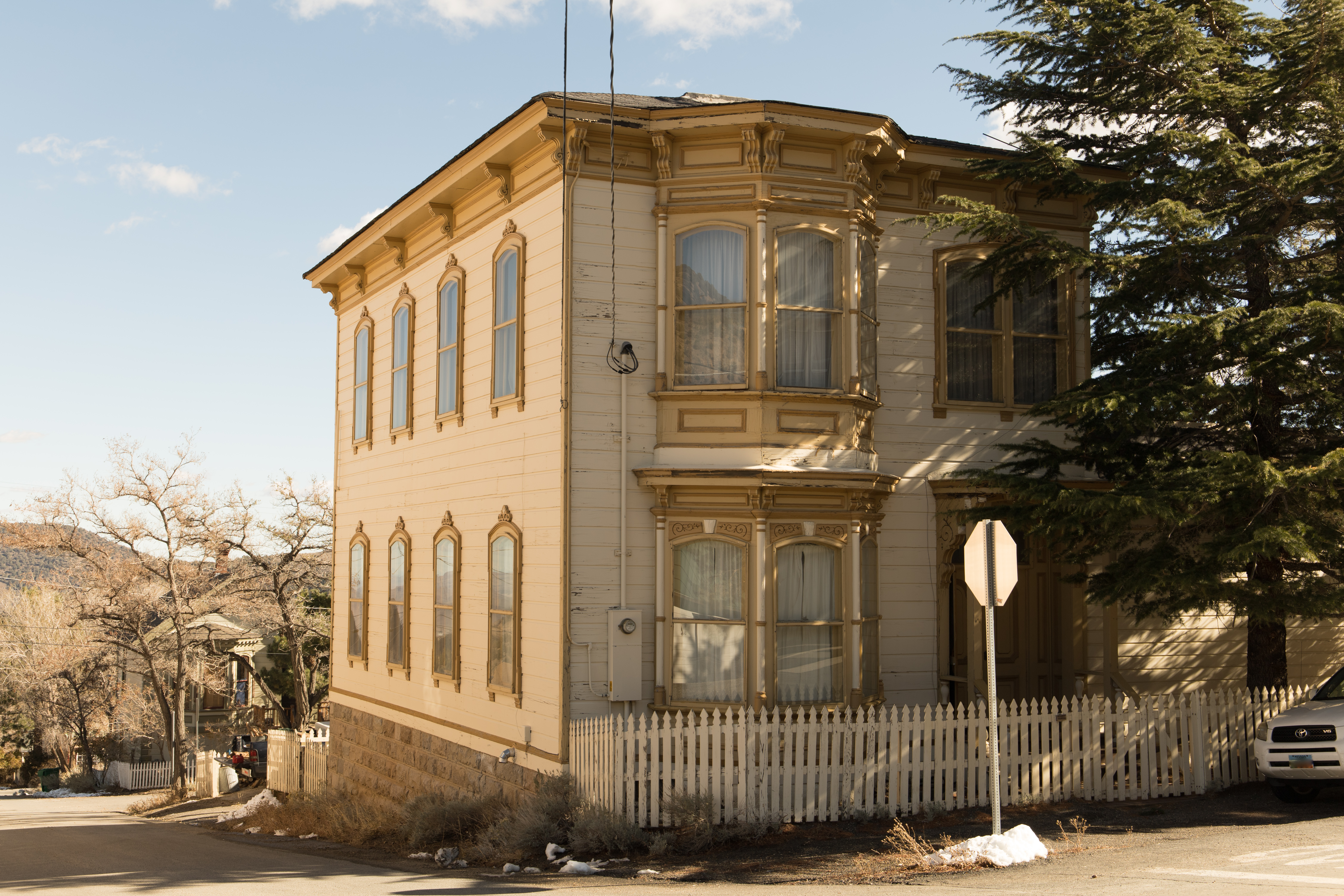

- Location within Nevada Location within the United States
- Location: 109 S. F St., Virginia City, Nevada
- Coordinates: 39°18′33″N 119°38′48″W
- Area: less than one acre
- Built: 1876
- Built by: Jones, Goodwin C.
- Architectural style: Italianate
- NRHP reference No.: 93000688
- Added to NRHP: August 5, 1993

The Parish House, at 109 S. F St. in Virginia City, Nevada, is a well-preserved historic Italianate-style house that was built in 1876. It is included in the Virginia City Historic District. It was individually listed on the National Register of Historic Places in 1993.

It was deemed significant for association with persons who lived there, and for its architecture. Persons lived there served the more successful who lived "on the Comstock" and included:

- Goodwin Jones, an engineer for the Caledonia Mine, one of the Comstock Lode mines
- Robert Patterson, proprietor of the International Saloon
- Dr. Thomas McDonald, a physician
- John McGrath, a merchant on C Street

The house was used as the parish house, i.e. rectory, of St. Mary's during 1935–1970, hence its name.

== Description ==
A Virginia City, Nevada, mining engineer, Goodwin Jones built the Parish House as his home. No record ensured the identity of the architect but the engineering abilities of Jones' was accounted for much of the design of construction. A couple of mining timbers were used as a fundamental part of the foundation. These timbers reflect the house’s association with mining. Redwood’s usage on the exterior wall and the durability of the rough-cut fur used for the frame attest to Jones' desire for a long-lived home. The Parish House has one living and dining room, a kitchen, 3 big bedrooms, and a few other small rooms; the size of the rooms is quite large as it was the style of Victorian Architecture. The Italianate style became well-liked after the Great Fire incident which took place in October 1875 and ravaged many areas of Virginia City. Later this decorative architectural style was in demand in Comstock for the physical manifestation of its economic success. Several owners owned and used the Parish House in the last 146 years. The house is standing square and true till date though some minor settling of the bay windows is noticeable. The Parish House is an evidence of Goodwin Jones' engineering skill and surely of the capability and knowledge of the anonymous builders.

The sight of the Mountains Catholic Church and the St. Paul Episcopal Church can be seen from the windows of the living room. It also shows different groups of people living in harmony in the neighborhood. The two churches were crucial parts of the neighborhood from their construction dates to the present date. These churches are contemporaries of the Parish House. The location of the old Methodist Church was close to the neighborhood which attested to the diversity of the neighborhood. According to the Census records, it is a substantially Irish area.

== Significance and context ==
The Parish House became eligible for the National Register of Historic Places firstly under criteria B as it was associated with some local prominent people who lived there, and lastly under criteria C, for its Italianate architectural style. The above-mentioned people who lived in Virginia City were dependent on the monetary wealth of the Comstock. The house is currently a private property and it’s not open to the public.
