= Parish House =

Parish House may refer to:

- Parish house, a church-related residence building
- Church of the Good Shepherd and Parish House, Hartford, Connecticut
- Parish House (Virginia City, Nevada), a former parish house of a St. Mary's church
- All Souls Episcopal Church and Parish House, Asheville, North Carolina
- Church of the Incarnation and Parish House, New York, New York
