= Henry Piper House =

Historic building in Nevada, US

- U.S. National Register of Historic Places
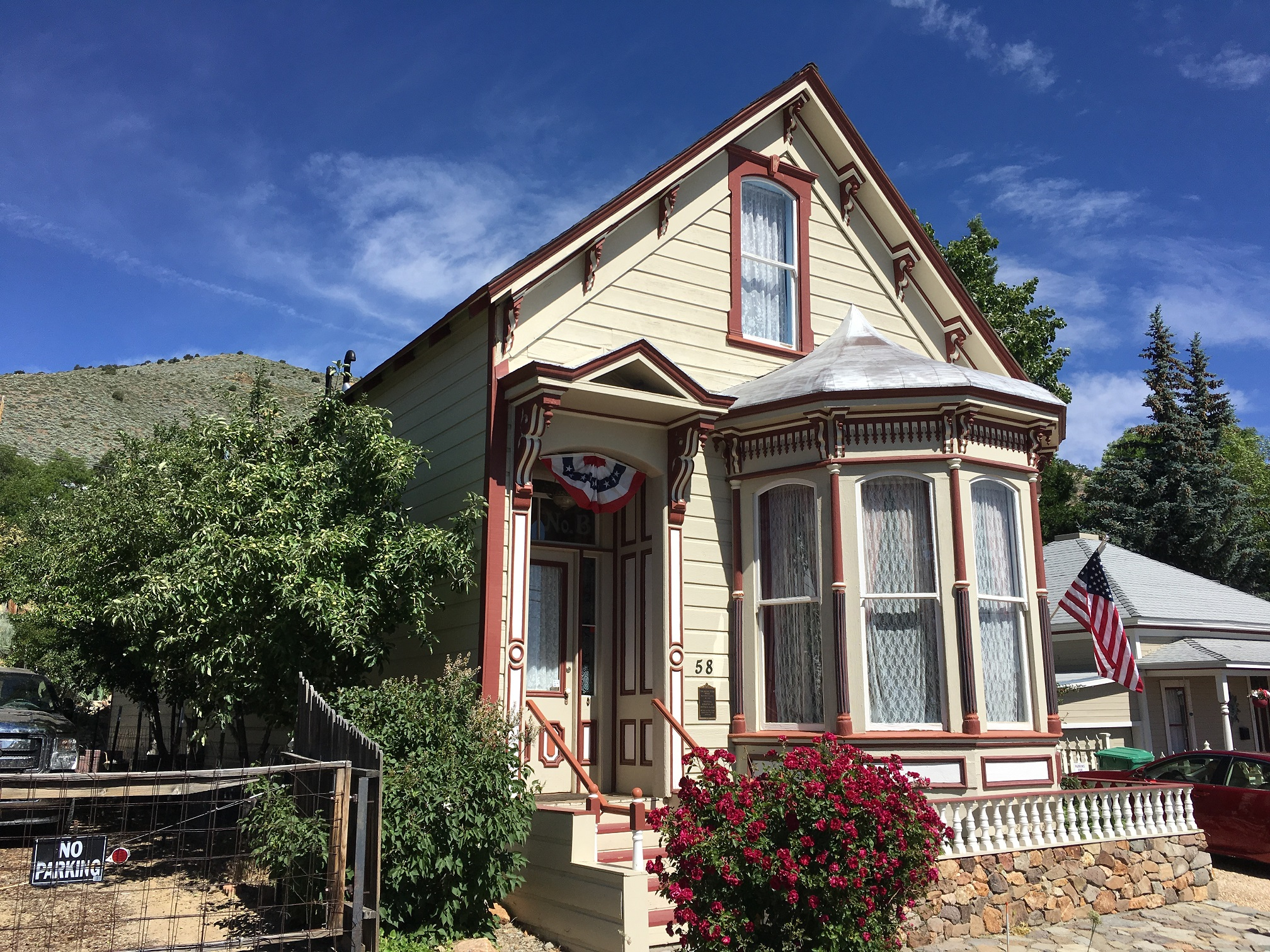

- Location within Nevada Location within the United States
- Location: 58 North B St., Virginia City, Nevada
- Coordinates: 39°18′42″N 119°38′59″W
- Built: 1875
- Built by: Henry Piper
- NRHP reference No.: 11000254
- Added to NRHP: May 4, 2011

The Henry Piper House, in Virginia City, Nevada, United States, is a historic house that is listed on the National Register of Historic Places (NRHP). It is operated as a bed and breakfast, the B Street House Bed and Breakfast, and is the only bed and breakfast in an individually-NRHP-listed house in Virginia City. The house was built after the Great Fire of 1875, which destroyed much of Virginia City, and was completed by December. The house was renovated into a bed and breakfast during 2004–2007, and it received a Nevada state historic preservation award for its renovation in 2008. It was listed on the National Register of Historic Places in 2011.

Henry moved to Virginia City in 1861 with his older brother John. The two maintained local political careers and partnered in the running of Piper's Opera House as well as the Piper's Corner Saloon on B and Union Streets. Henry served in the Nevada Assembly for one term later becoming a "box herder" at Piper's Opera House. His job was the management of the often drunk and disorderly women of the demimonde and youthful miners who attended the Opera House productions.

== See also ==
- Piper's Opera House, also NRHP-listed in Virginia City
- Piper-Beebe House, also NRHP-listed in Virginia City
