= Piper–Beebe House =

Historic house in Nevada, United States

- U.S. National Register of Historic Places
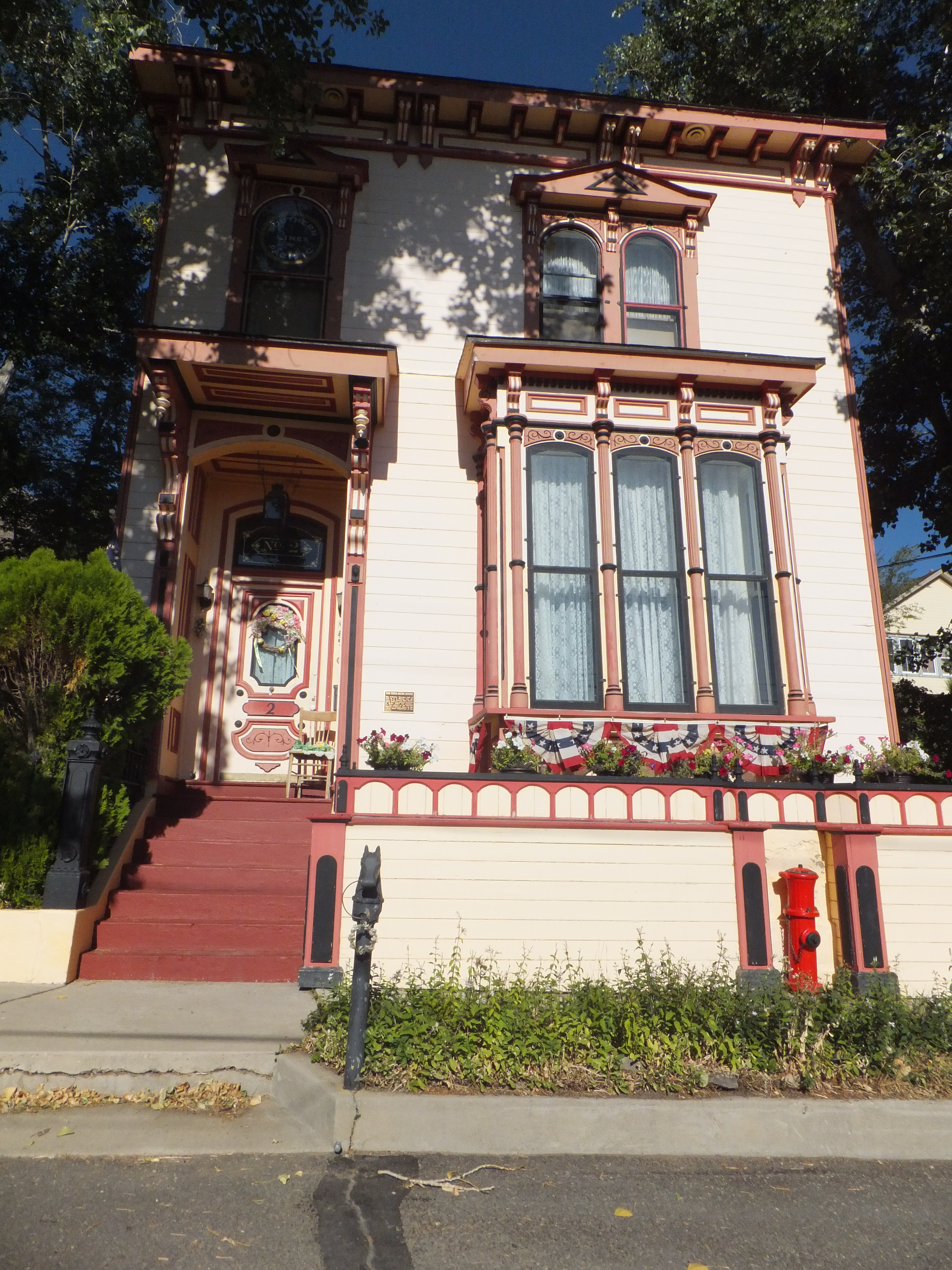

- Location within Nevada Location within the United States
- Location: 2 S. A St., Virginia City, Nevada
- Coordinates: 39°18′40″N 119°38′59″W
- Area: less than one acre
- Built: 1876
- Architect: MacKay, A.F.
- Architectural style: Italianate
- NRHP reference No.: 93000684
- Added to NRHP: August 5, 1993

The Piper–Beebe House, located at 2 S. A St. in Virginia City, Nevada, is a historic Italianate house that is listed on the National Register of Historic Places. It was an 1876 work of Virginia City builder/architect A.F. MacKay, the only one of his works in Virginia City that survives. It was built after the "Great Fire" of 1875 that destroyed much of the city.

The house was listed on the National Register of Historic Places in 1993. It has also been known as the Piper–Clegg House. It is also listed on the National Register as a contributing building within the National Historic Landmark Virginia City Historic District. It was deemed significant for association with its owners and for its architecture.
