= Knights of Pythias Building (Virginia City, Nevada) =

- Knights of Pythias Hall
- U.S. Historic district – Contributing property
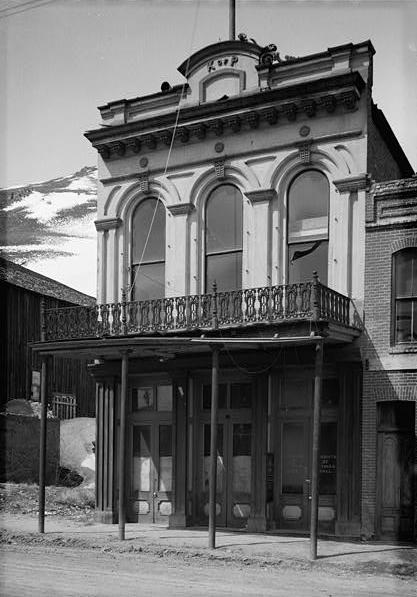
- Knights of Pythias, 1937
- Location: West side B Street, between Union & Sutton Streets, Virginia City, Nevada
- Built: 1876
- Part of: Virginia City Historic District (ID66000458)

The Knights of Pythias Building, also known as the Knights of Pythias Hall, is an historic Knights of Pythias lodge hall located in Virginia City, Nevada, United States. It was built of cast iron and stuccoed brick in 1876 by Nevada Lodge No. 1 of the Knights of Pythias, which had been formed on March 23, 1873. It was also used the city's other Knights of Pythias lodges: Lincoln Lodge No. 6 formed in 1874, and Triumph Lodge No. 11 formed in 1879. It is one of the few unaltered false-fronted buildings remaining in Virginia City. The Knights of Pythias Building is a contributing property in the Virginia City Historic District which was declared a National Historic Landmark in 1961 and added to the National Register of Historic Places in 1966.

Like many fraternal buildings, the upper floor was used for the lodge hall while the first floor was rented out. An 1880 map shows the first floor being occupied by The Armory.
