= C. J. Prescott House =

Historic house in Nevada, United States

- U.S. National Register of Historic Places
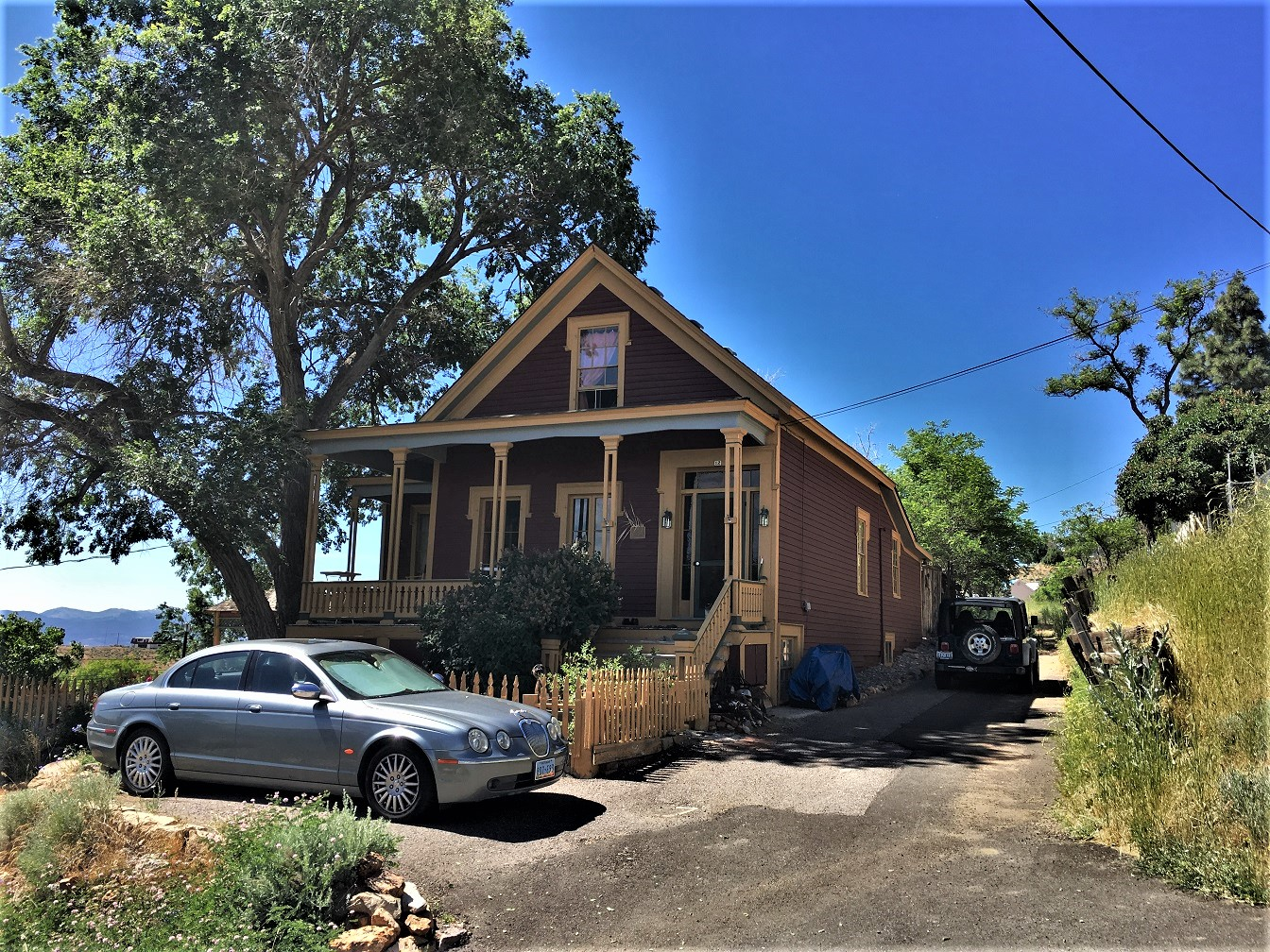
- C. J. Prescott House in 2019

- Location within Nevada Location within the United States
- Location: 12 Hickey St. Virginia City, Nevada
- Coordinates: 39°18′12″N 119°39′1″W
- Area: 2 acres (0.81 ha)
- Built: 1864
- Built by: Prescott, C.J.
- Architectural style: vernacular Victorian/Italianate
- NRHP reference No.: 93000687
- Added to NRHP: August 5, 1993

The C. J. Prescott House, at 12 Hickey St. in Virginia City, Nevada, is a historic house that was built in 1864. It is listed on the National Register of Historic Places.

It is one of the oldest houses in Virginia City, one of few surviving from Nevada's pre-statehood era, and having survived the "Great Fire" of October 26, 1875.

It was built by C. J. Prescott, who owned an early lumber company serving the Comstock Lode. It is a 1 1/2-story wood-frame house with vernacular Victorian/Italianate style, with three chimneys and redwood shiplap siding. At the time of its NRHP listing, its exterior colors were oxblood plus gold and green trim, the original colors of the house from 1864.

It is included as a contributing property also in the National Historic Landmark and NRHP-listed Virginia City Historic District. The house was listed on the National Register of Historic Places in 1993.

== See also ==
- National Register of Historic Places in Storey County, Nevada
