= Fourth Ward School (Virginia City, Nevada) =

- U.S. Historic district – Contributing property
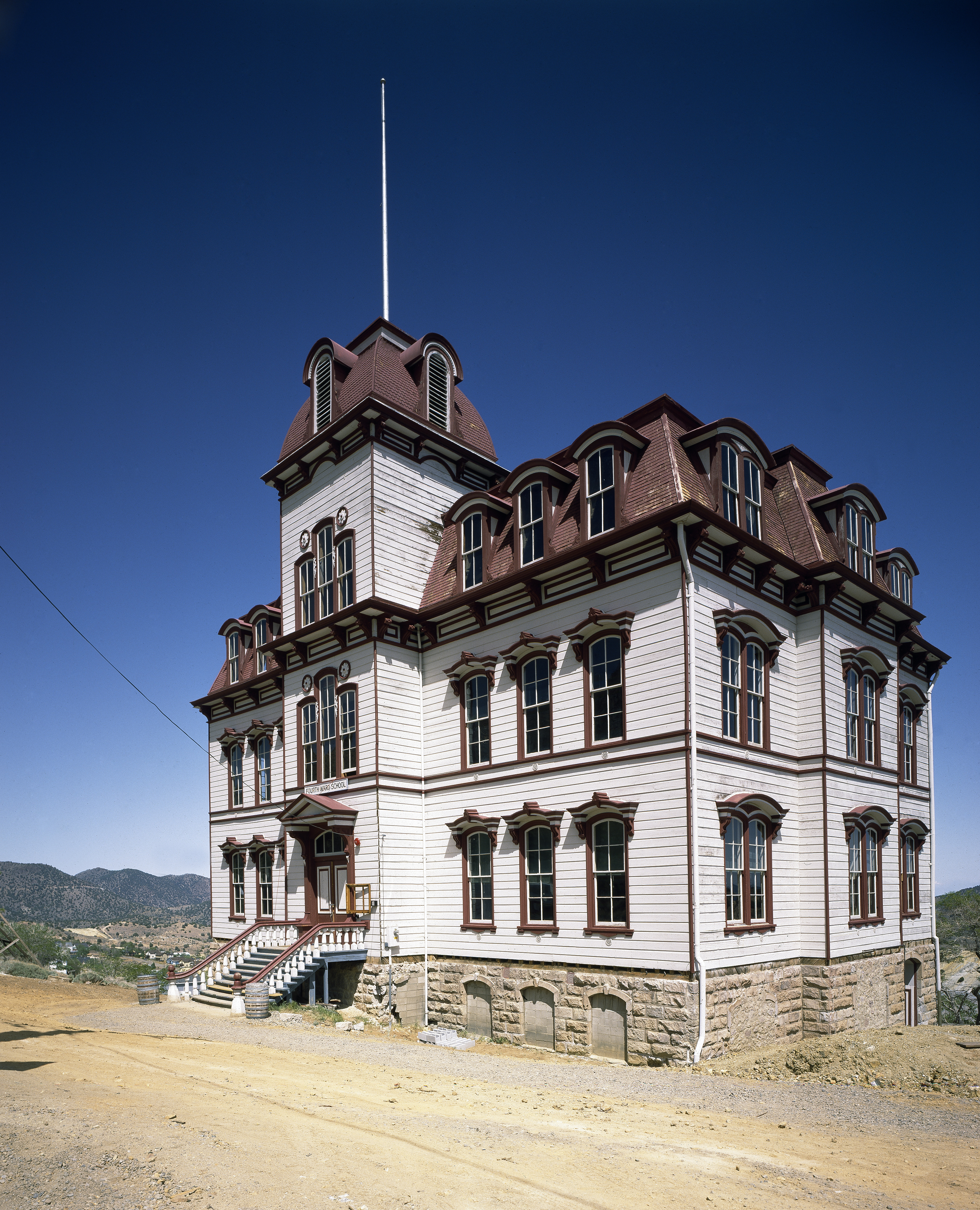
- Fourth Ward School
- Location: 537 South "C" Street; Virginia City, Nevada
- Built: 1876
- Architect: C. M. Bennett
- Architectural style: Second Empire
- Part of: Virginia City Historic District (ID66000458)

The Fourth Ward School is an historic 4-story mansard-roofed former public school building located at 537 South "C" Street in Virginia City, Nevada. Designed in 1876 by architect C. M. Bennett in the Second Empire style of architecture, it was designed to accommodate over 1000 students in grades 1 though 9, it was divided into three departments: primary (grades 1 though 4); second grammar (grades 5 though 7) and high school (grades 8 and 9). Grades 10 & 11 were added in 1877 and a senior year as added by 1909. It featured many modern conveniences, such as indoor plumbing with indoor flush toilets, hand washing sinks, and drinking fountains, as well as indoor gas lighting and central heat. The School graduated its last class in 1936, after which its students were moved to a new school built by the Works Progress Administration.

The building then fell into disrepair and remained closed until 1986 when it was reopened as the Historic Fourth Ward School Museum. The museum features exhibits including the Vintage Classroom, Comstock Lode history, Alumni, a changing gallery which offers new exhibits every year to two years, Printing & Mark Twain Mark Twain’s life, and Modern Mining and Minerals. This school house is the last one standing in the US of this design and architecture built of wood. It is also a White House designated "American Treasure".

The Fourth Ward School is a contributing property in the Virginia City Historic District which was declared a National Historic Landmark in 1961 and added to the National Register of Historic Places in 1966.
