= St. Peter's Episcopal Church (Carson City, Nevada) =

Historic church in Nevada, United States

- U.S. National Register of Historic Places
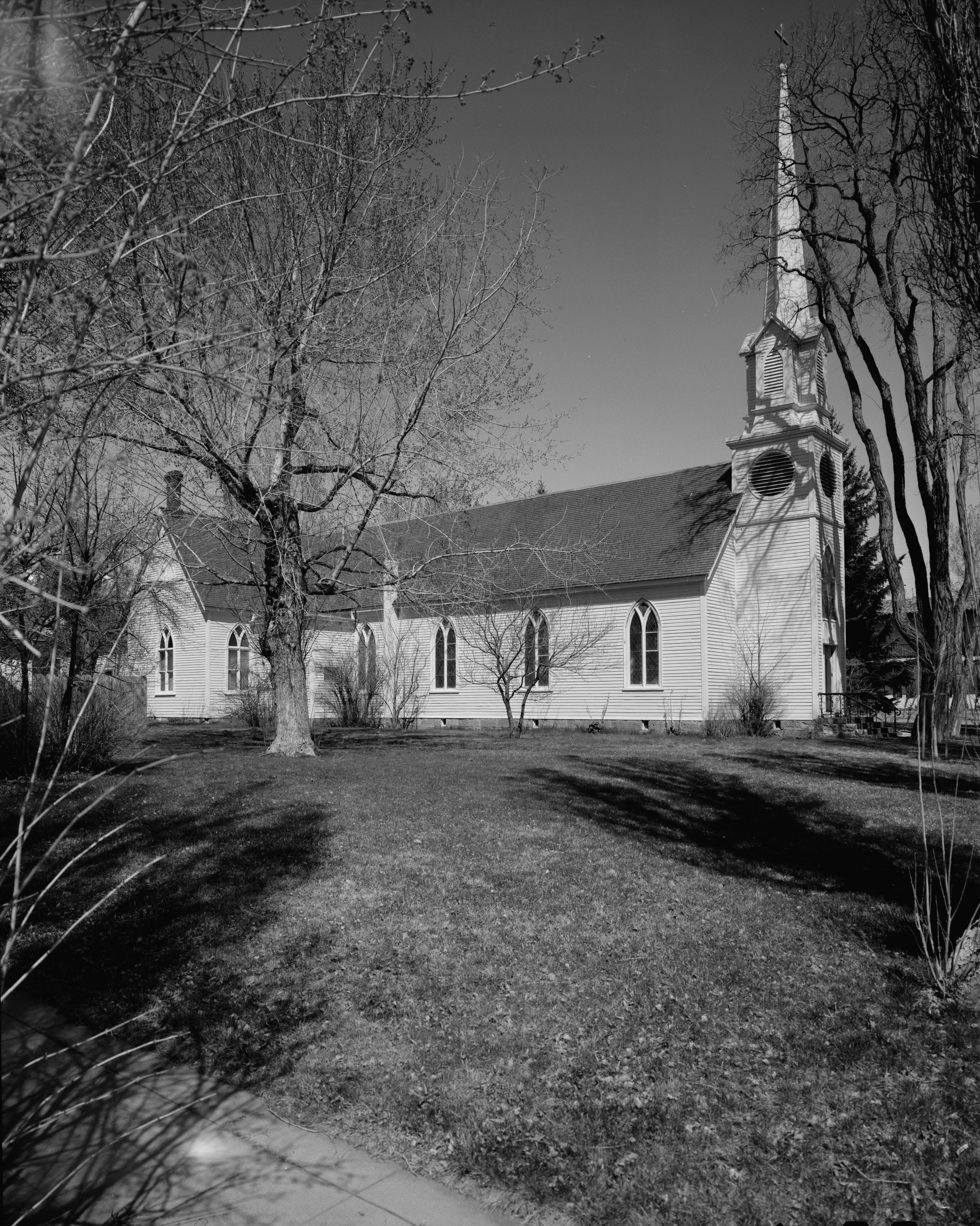
- St. Peter's in 1973

- Location within Nevada Location within the United States
- Location: Division & Telegraph Streets; Carson City, Nevada
- Coordinates: 39°9′56″N 119°46′9″W
- Built: 1867–1868
- Architect: Built by the Corbett brothers, possibly designed by Henry Marvin Yerington
- Architectural style: Carpenter Gothic
- NRHP reference No.: 78003215
- Added to NRHP: January 3, 1978

St. Peter's Episcopal Church is a large historic Carpenter Gothic Episcopal church building located at the corner of Division and Telegraph streets in Carson City, Nevada. Built in 1868, it is the oldest Episcopal church still in use in Nevada. On January 3, 1978, it was listed on the National Register of Historic Places.

In 2019, the church reported 240 members; in 2023, it reported 206 members. No membership statistics were reported in 2024 national parochial reports. Plate and pledge financial support reported by the church in 2024 was $146,947. Average Sunday Attendance (ASA) reported in 2024 was 61 persons. This was a relative decrease from ASA of 103 persons reported in 2015.

== History ==
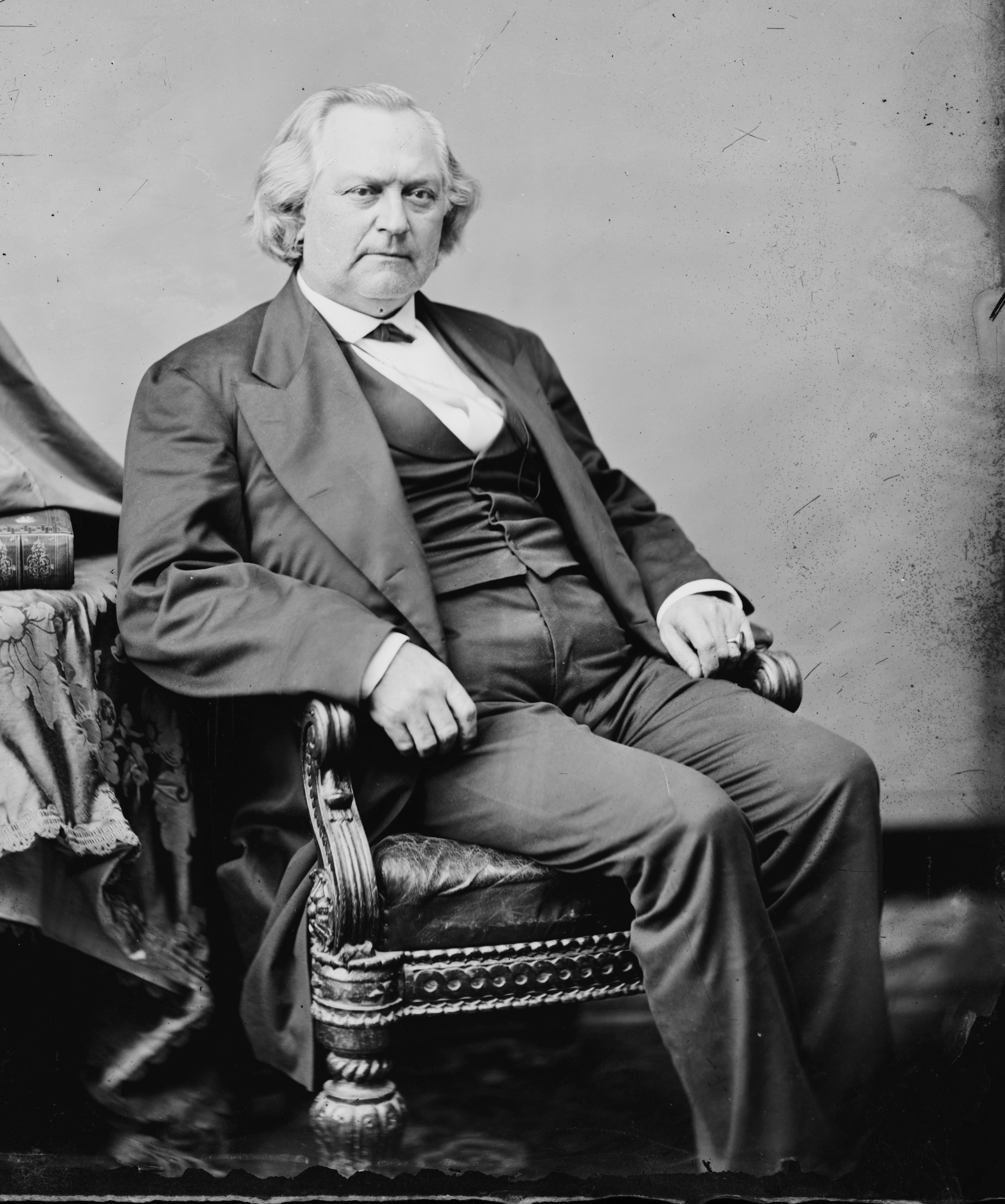
James W. Nye, one of the church's first vestrymen.

On November 9, 1863, laymen D. S. King and A. H. Griswold were selected as the first wardens of the new parish in Carson City. Nevada territorial governor James W. Nye and businessman Henry Marvin Yerington were among the first vestrymen. The site for a new church building was acquired in 1865. The women of the congregation helped raise construction funds through social events, such as sales at fairs and other activities.

=== Construction ===
Building plans were announced in July 1867. The Corbett brothers built the exterior walls and shingled roof by October 27 of that year and completed the steeple on November 3, 1867. Construction work concluded in July 1868 at a cost of $5,500. The first sermon in the new building was delivered by the Reverend George B. Allen on August 8, 1868. The first rector was William Maxwell Reilly. The church was consecrated by Bishop Ozi William Whitaker on June 19, 1870.

Work to expand the church building by 24 feet (7.3 m) commenced in October 1873 and was completed in April 1874. A library was added in 1875. The stained glass window in front of the belfry, a gift from England, was shipped by sea around Cape Horn to San Francisco, from which it was delivered by wagon to Carson City. The original church bell became badly cracked by 1881, and was recast by the local machine shop of the Virginia and Truckee Railroad. A private residence to the south of the church as acquired for use as a rectory in 1891, at a cost of $3,500. That same year, the church purchased a pipe organ for $1,700. Other modernizations to the structure include the addition of a kitchen and plumbing as well as electrical lighting in 1919.

=== Continued use ===
The church struggled through a collapse of the state's mining industry in the late 19th century, as well as temporary closure in 1909. After recovering from a period as an "aided parish" from 1920 to 1957, the building has remained the oldest Episcopal church still in use in the state of Nevada. However, St. Paul's Episcopal Church, organized in September 1861 at Virginia City, Nevada, is the oldest parish in the state. The current minister of St. Peter's, the Reverend Jeff Paul, has been with the church since September 1995.

== Architecture ==
The identity of the architect is uncertain, but architectural historians believe Henry Marvin Yerington was involved in the design of the church. The Gothic Revival building has been noted for its "architectural sophistication", with elements of Medieval and Classic origin, according to the Carson City Historical Commission. The interior resembles the upside-down hull of a ship. The pews are arranged in three groups of rows, making this the only Episcopal church west of the Mississippi River without a center aisle to the altar. The auditorium measures 70 feet following the 1874 expansion, which added a lecture and sunday school room in two respective wings. The chancel is supported by fluted Roman Corinthian columns. The wood-framed structure sits upon a low foundation made of sandstone ashlar. The steeple is a 1977 replica that was built to replace damage to the building from a fire.

== Notable members ==
- James W. Nye – Territorial Governor and U.S. Senator

== See also ==
- Historic American Buildings Survey
- National Register of Historic Places listings in Carson City, Nevada
