= Virginia City Historic District (Virginia City, Nevada) =

Historic district in Nevada, United States

Coordinates: 39°18′37″N 119°38′58″W

- U.S. National Register of Historic Places
- U.S. National Historic Landmark District
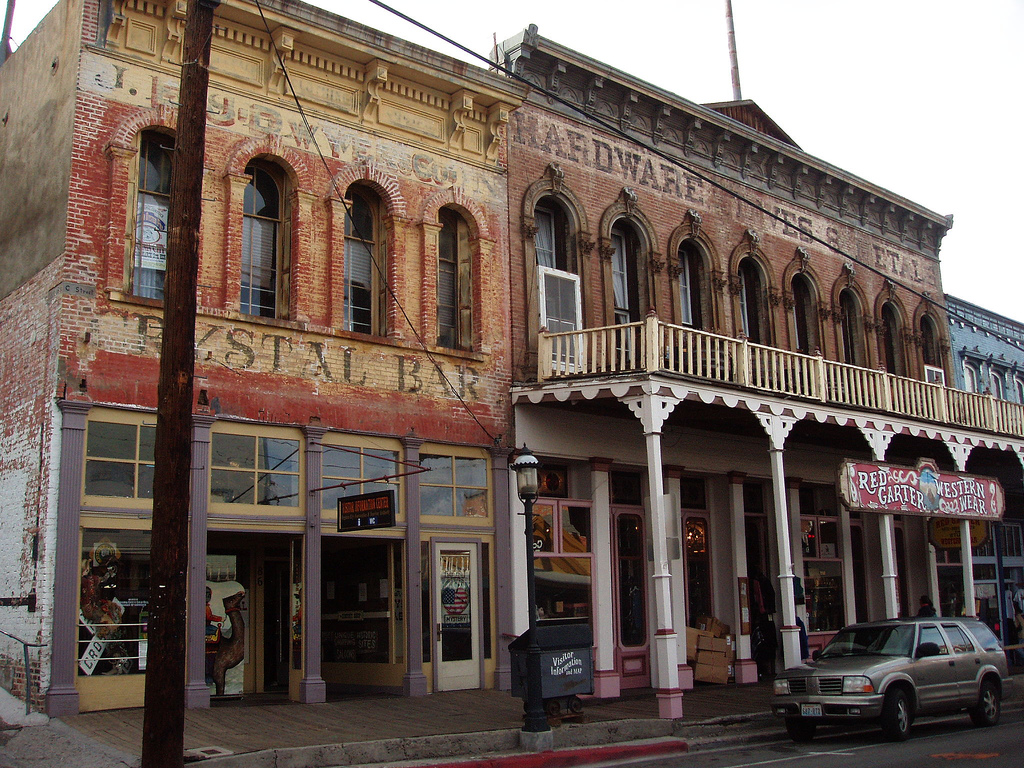

- Location within Nevada Location within the United States
- Location: Virginia City, Nevada, United States
- Area: 14,750 acres (59.7 km^{2})
- Built: 1859
- Architectural style: Bungalow/craftsman, Late Victorian
- NRHP reference No.: 66000458

Significant dates
- Added to NRHP: October 15, 1966
- Designated NHLD: July 4, 1961

Virginia City Historic District is a National Historic Landmark District encompassing the former mining villages of Virginia City and Gold Hill, both in Storey County, as well as Dayton and Silver City, both to the south in adjacent Lyon County, Nevada, United States. Declared a National Historic Landmark in 1961, the district is one of only six in the state of Nevada.

Virginia City was the prototype for future frontier mining boom towns, with its industrialization and urbanization. It owed its success to the 1859 discovery of the Comstock Lode. The town is laid out in a grid pattern 1,500 feet below the top of Mount Davidson. Most of the buildings are two to three story brick buildings, with the first floors used for saloons and shops. Virginia City was the first silver rush town, and the first to intensely apply large-scale industrial mining methods.

After a year in existence, the boomtown had 42 saloons, 42 stores, 6 restaurants, 3 hotels, and 868 dwellings to house a town residency of 2,345. At its height in 1863, the town had 15,000 residents. From its creation in 1859 to 1875, there were five widespread fires. The 1875 fire, dubbed the Great Fire of 1875, caused $12,000,000 in damages.

Virginia City continues to attract over 2 million visitors per year. In 2004, the historic buildings were considered to be in a "threatened" state. An inactive mining pit may subside, causing some of the buildings to slide into the pit. The cemeteries have been, and continue to be, vandalized, while erosion threatens more damage. Continued use of the district for tourism is harming historical buildings that are still in use, while neglect of privately held unused buildings increases the damage to the historic nature of the entire district.

== Other NRHP listings within the district ==
- Piper's Opera House, 1885
- Henry Piper House, 1875
- C. J. Prescott House, 1864; 12 Hickey Street
- Chollar Mansion, 1862–1864; 565 South D Street

== Contributing properties ==
The National Register of Historic Places inventory nomination form lists 65 contributing properties in the historic district, including:

- First Presbyterian Church - 1867; only extant church constructed before the 1875 fire
- Fourth Ward School - 1876; a school until 1936; operating as a museum
- Knights of Pythias Building - 1876; located on west side of B St., between Union & Sutton St.; constructed with cast iron and stuccoed brick
- St. Mary's in the Mountains Catholic Church - 1868 (destroyed by 1875 fire); rebuilt in 1876–77; St. Mary's is designed as a basilica; still open for services
- St. Paul's Episcopal Church - 1862 (destroyed by 1875 fire); rebuilt in 1876; still open for services
- Storey County Courthouse - 1876–77; replaced the first county courthouse that was destroyed by the 1875 fire; the brick building is still in use
- Territorial Enterprise building - 1870s; Mark Twain worked as a reporter in the building

== Gallery ==
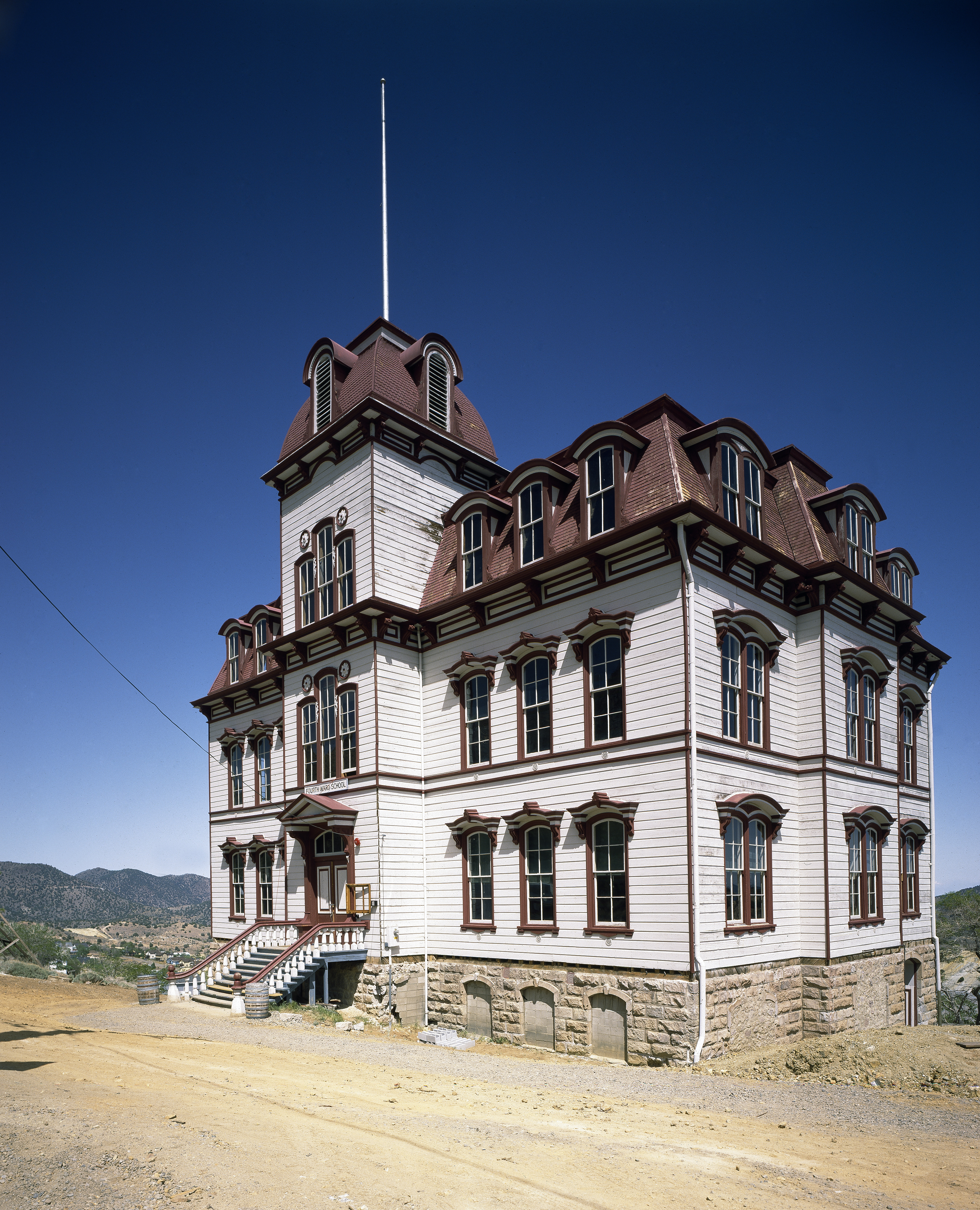
Fourth Ward School, 1876

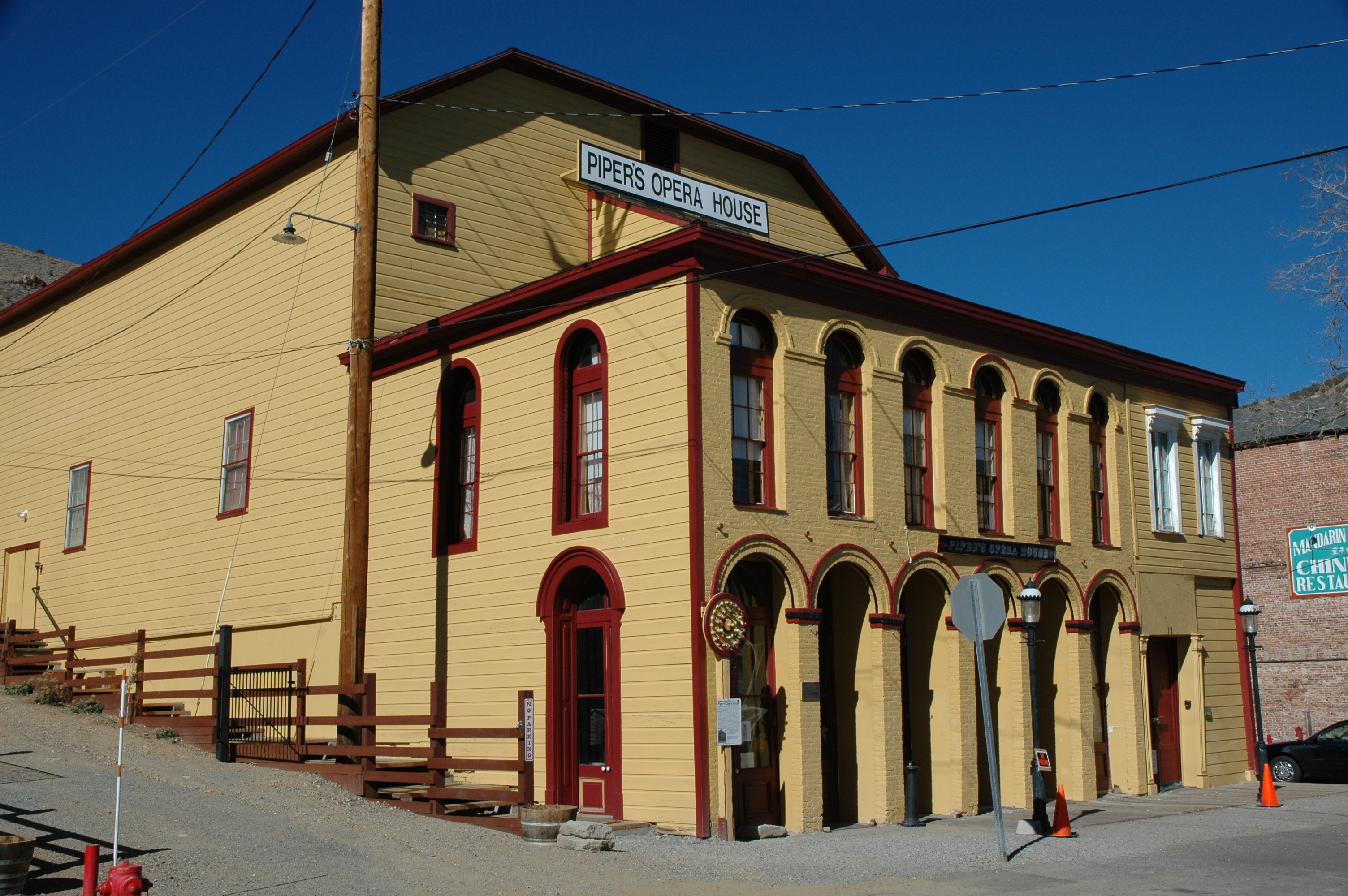
Piper's Opera House, 1883–1885

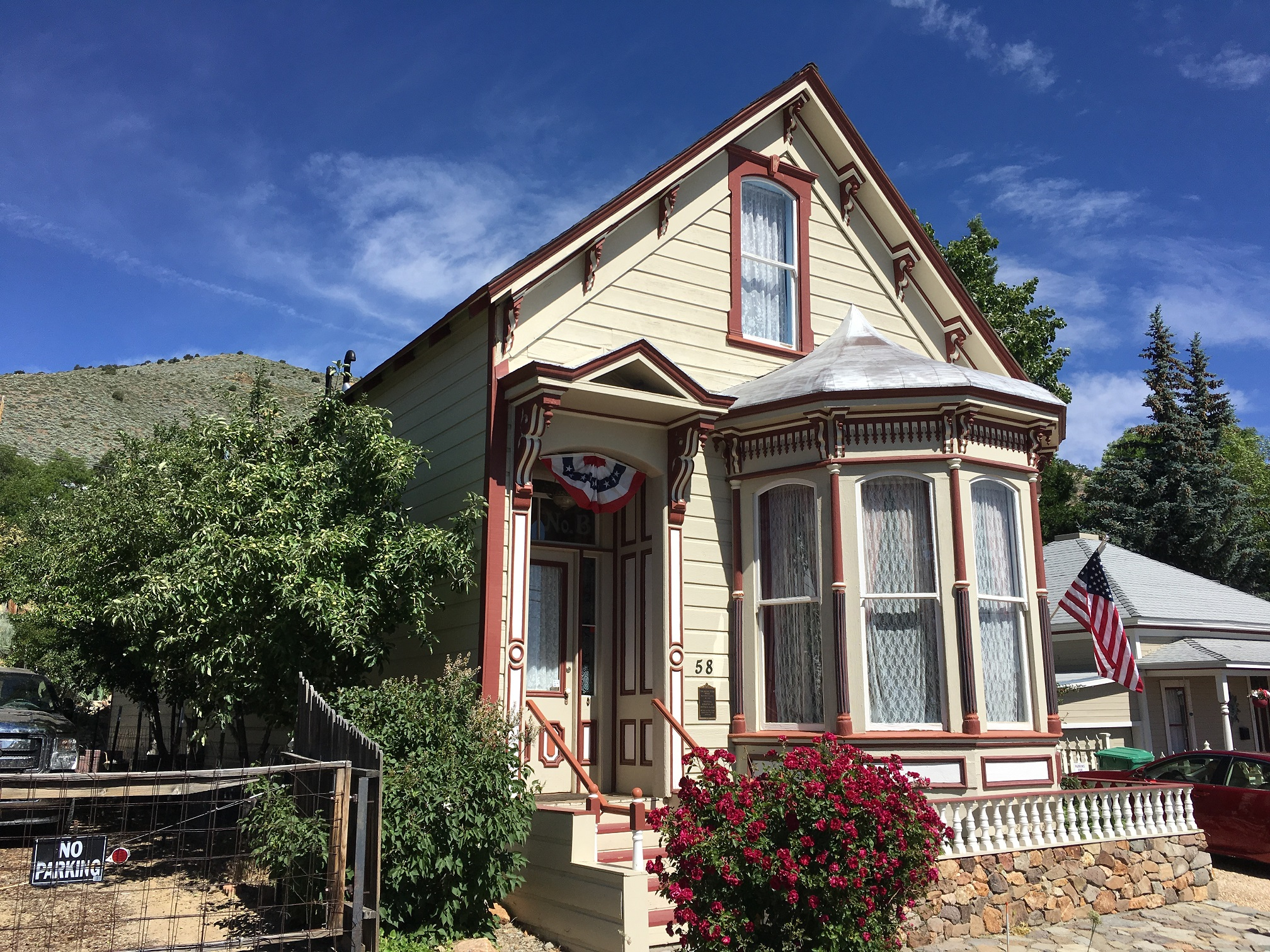
Henry Piper House, 1875

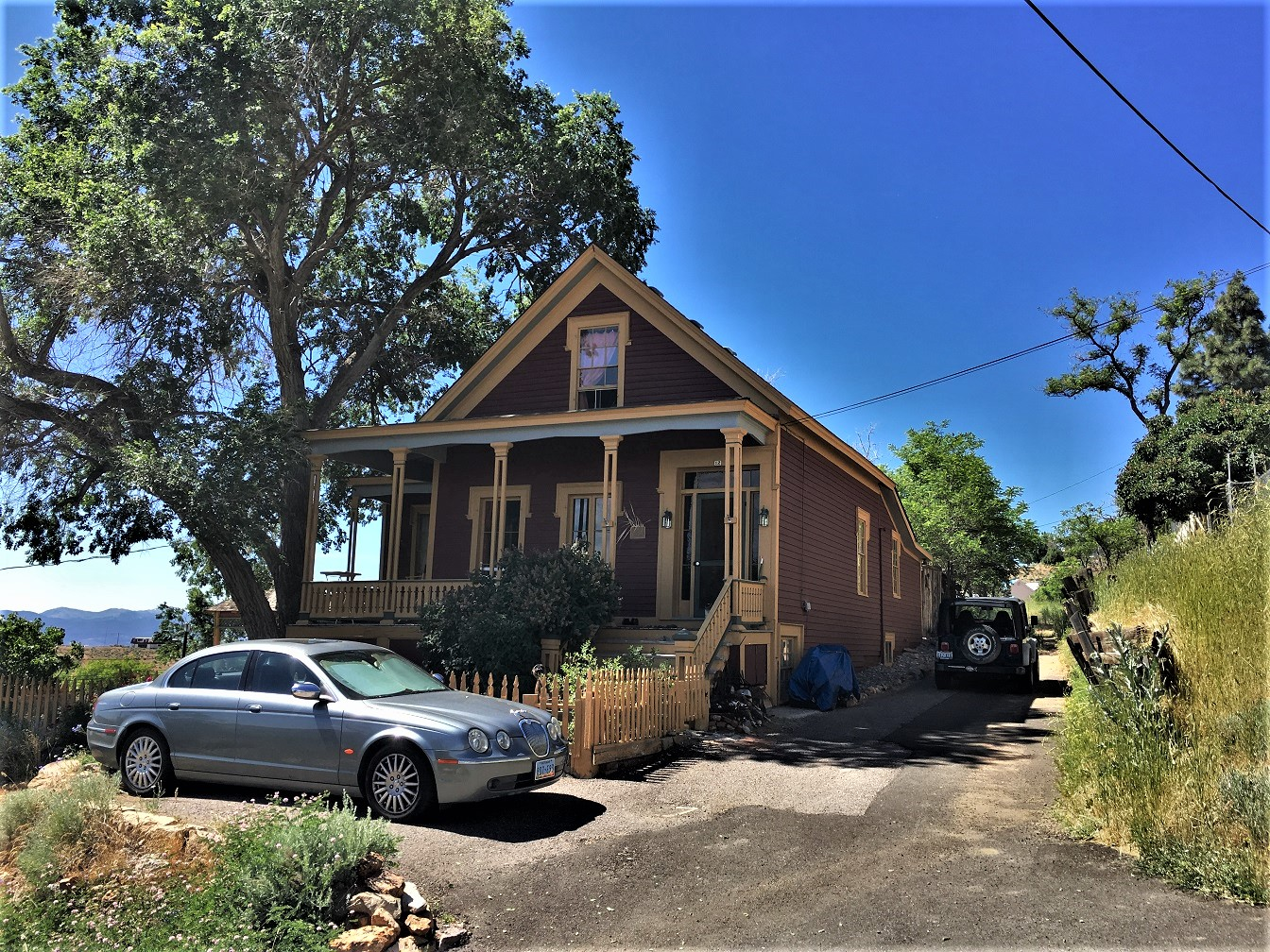
C. J. Prescott House, 1864

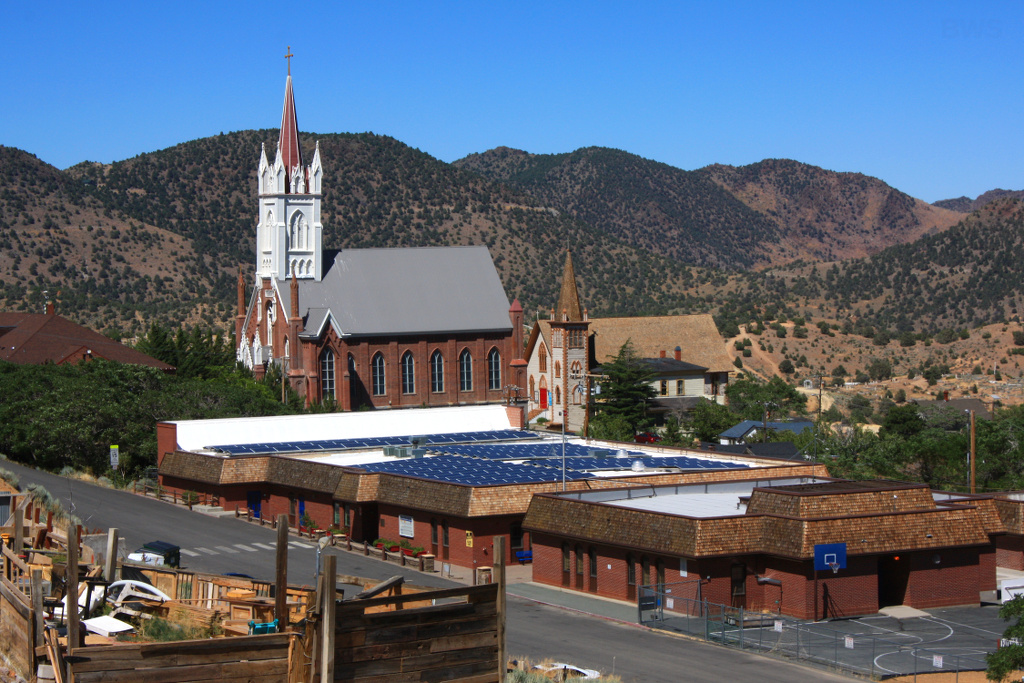
Saint Mary's and Saint Paul's churchs, both 1876

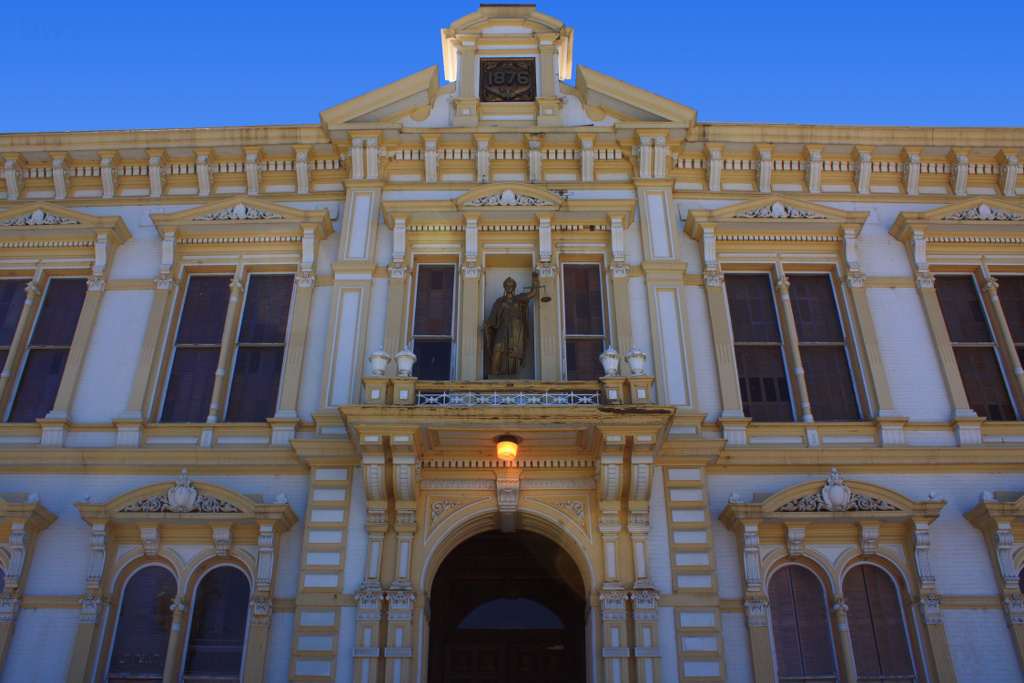
Storey County Courthouse, 1876–1877

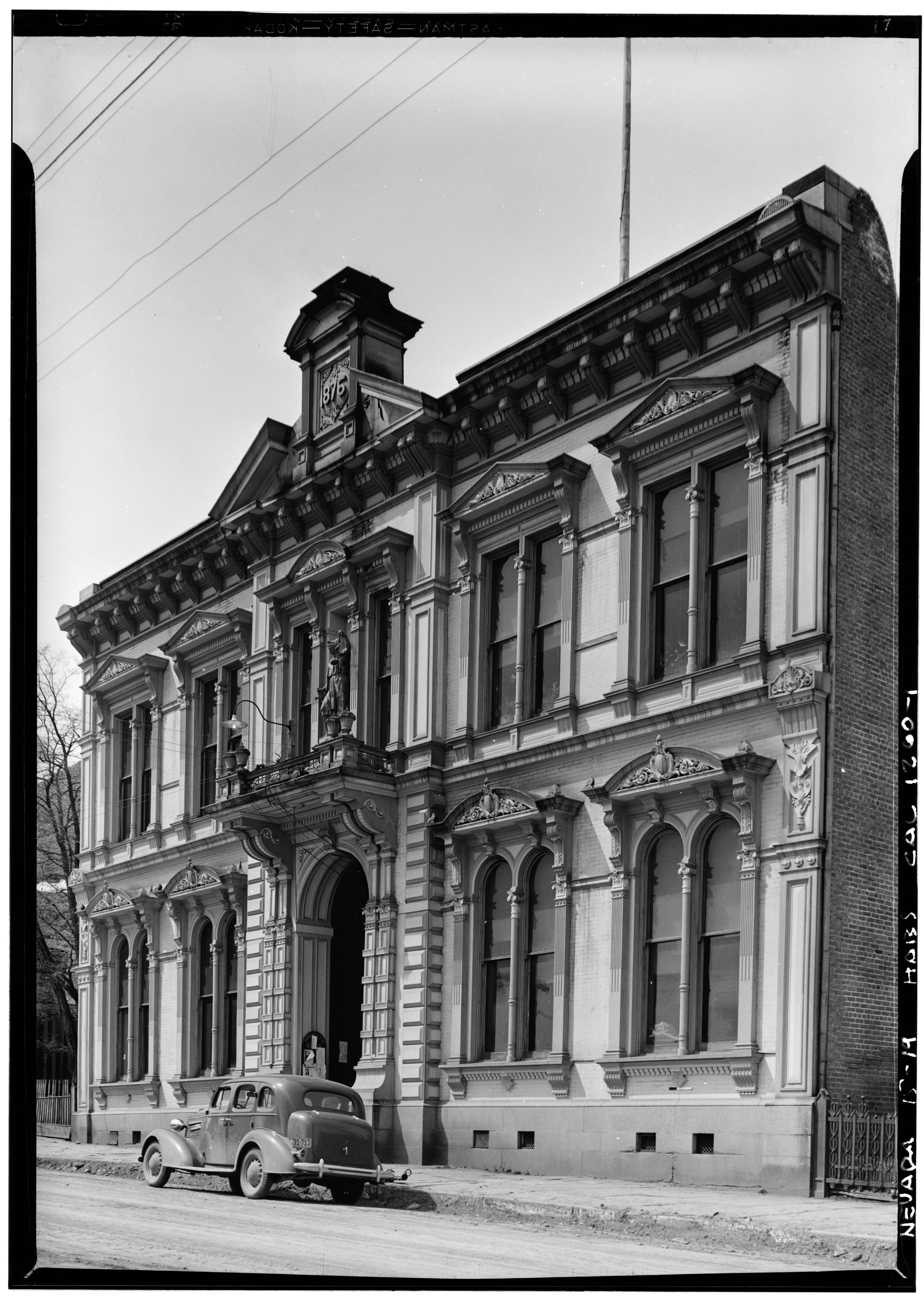
Storey County Courthouse

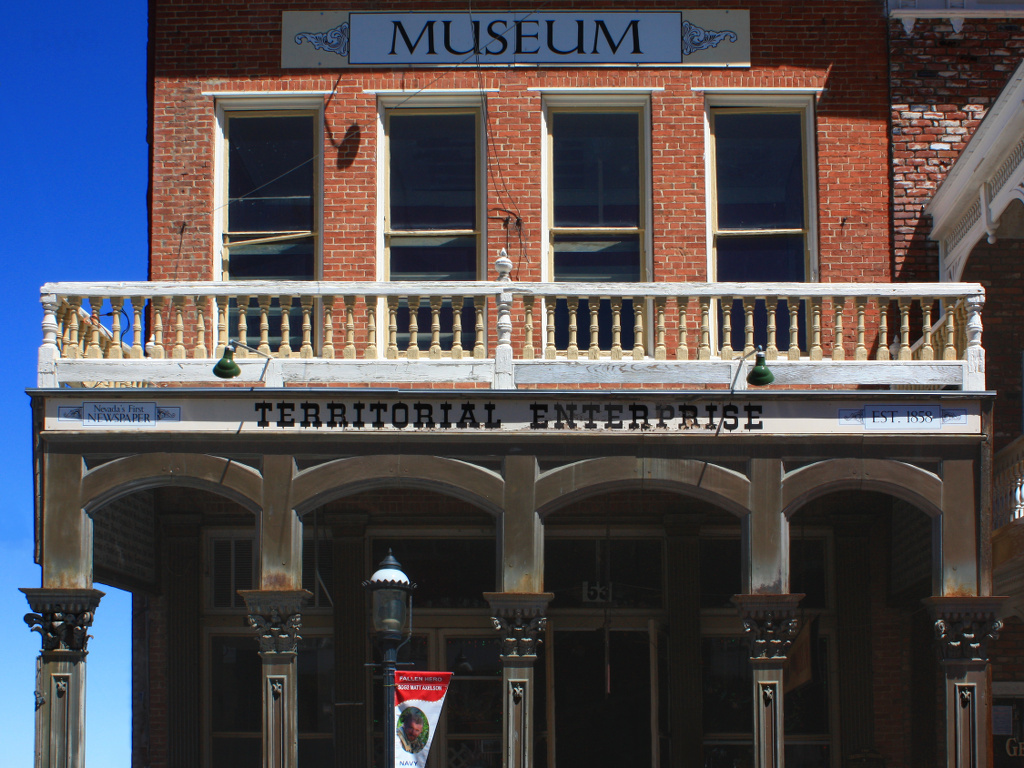
Territorial Enterprise, 1862

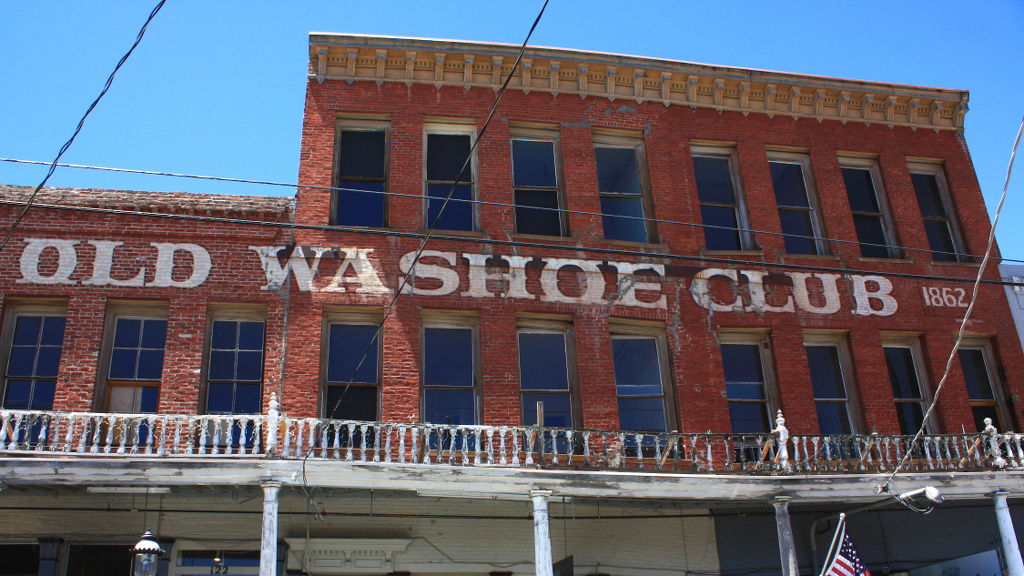
Old Washoe Club, 1862

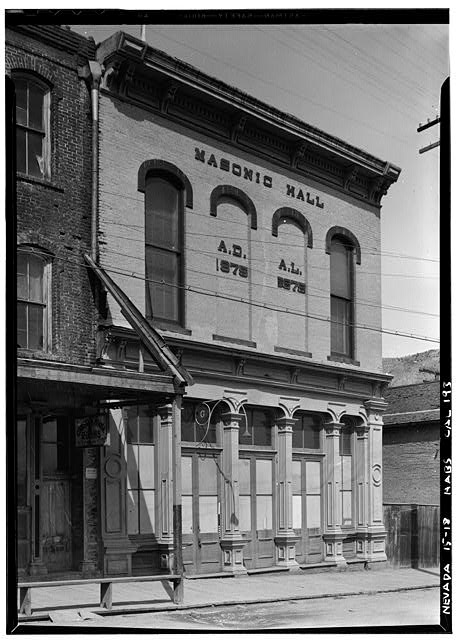
Masonic Hall, 1875

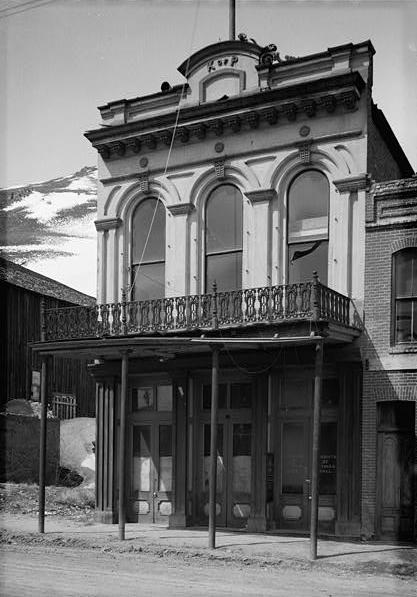
Knights of Pythias Hall, 1876

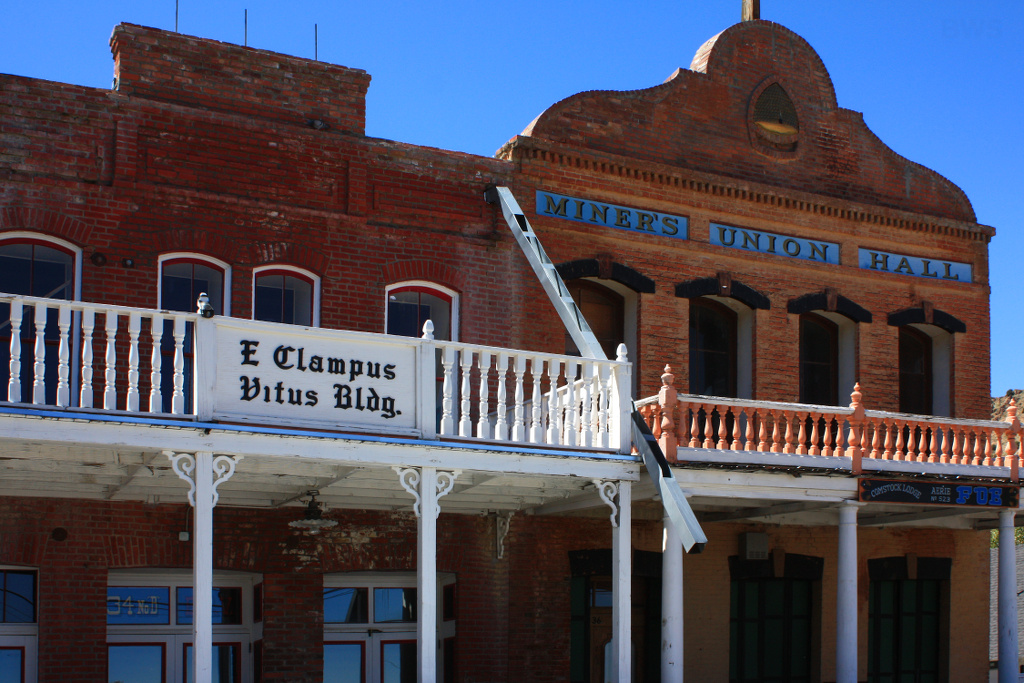
Miners Union Hall, 1876

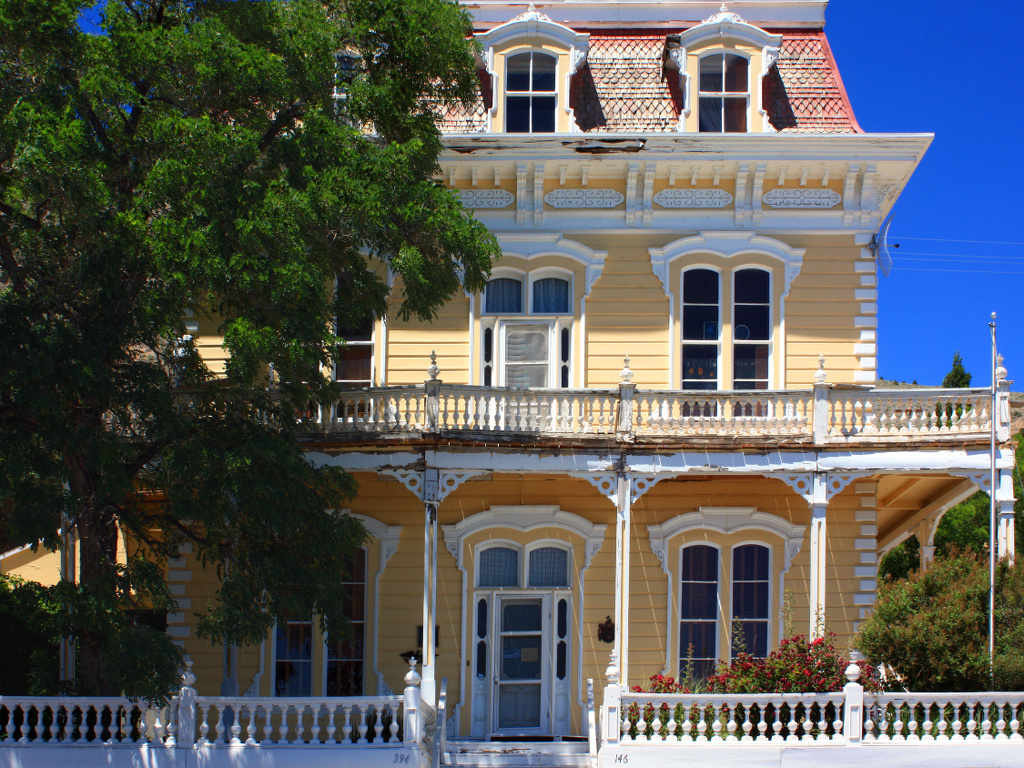
Savage Mansion, 1876

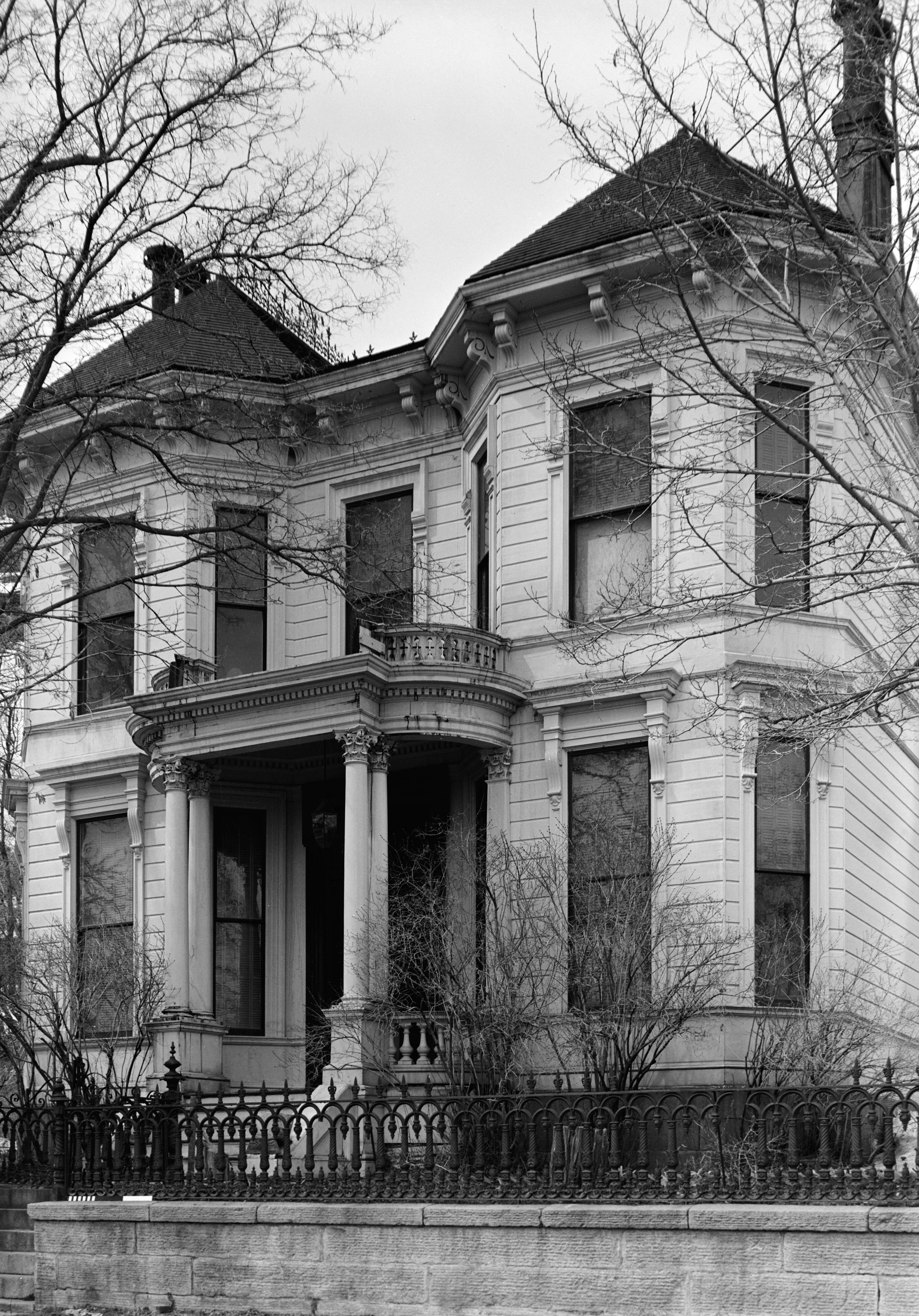
King-McBride Mansion, 1876

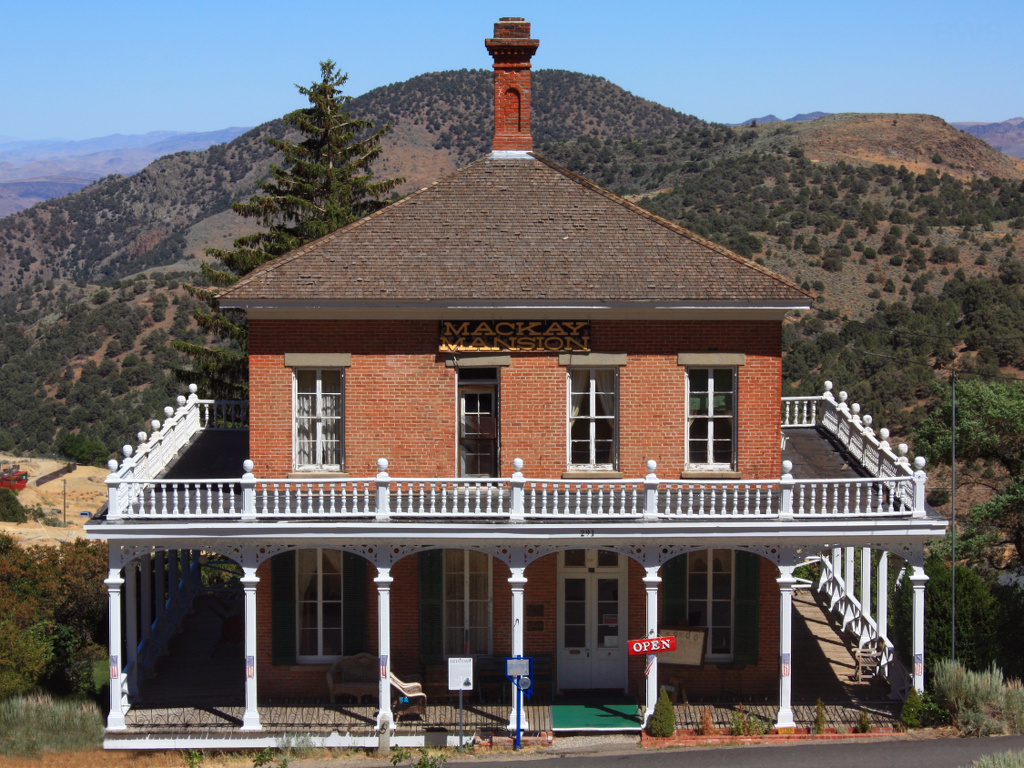
Mackay Mansion, 1860s

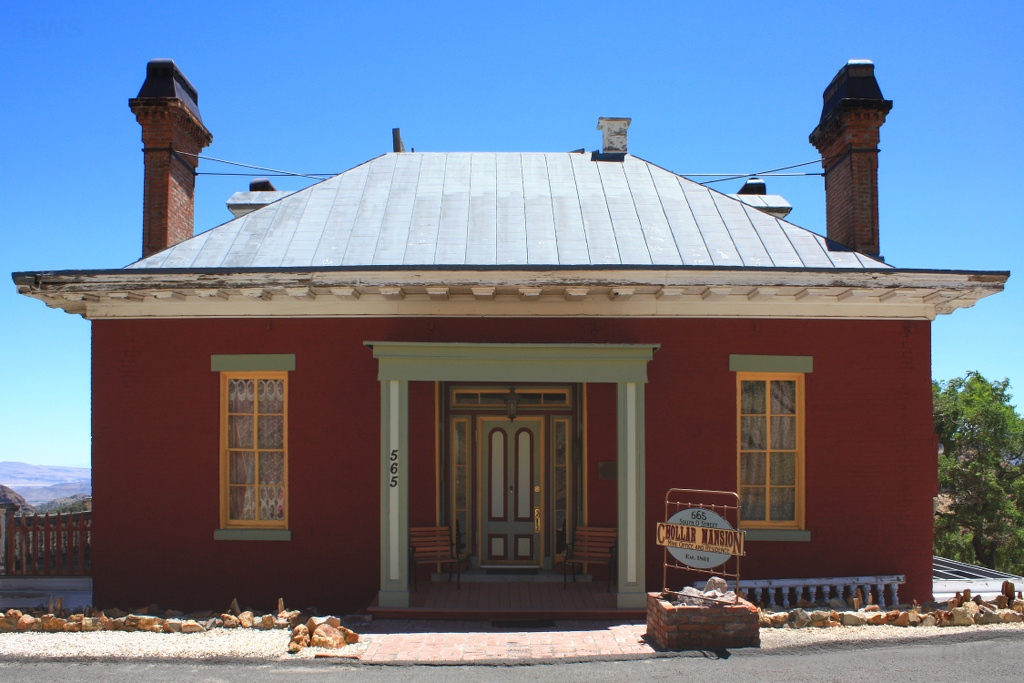
Chollar Mansion, 1862–1864

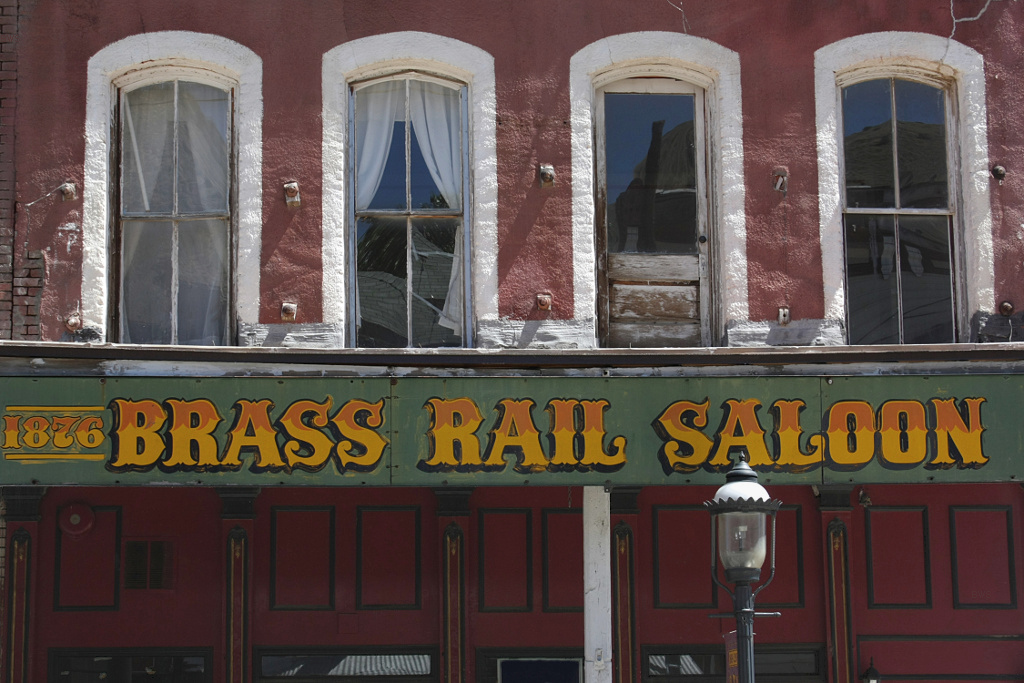
Brass Rail Saloon, 1876

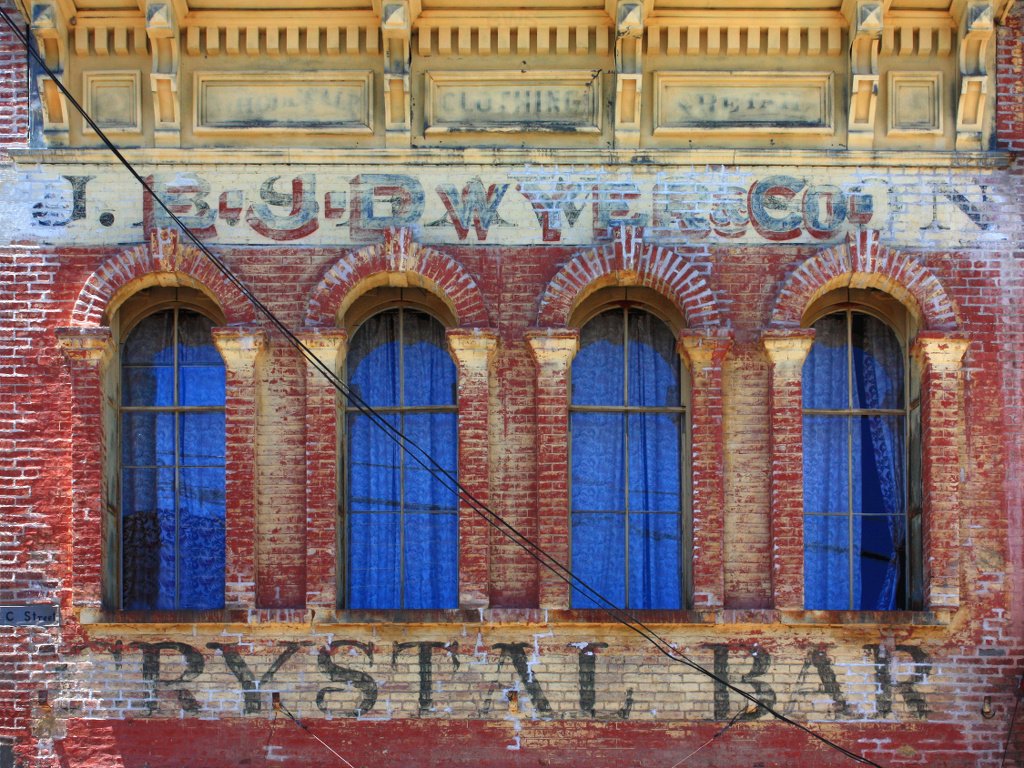
Crystal Bar, c.1876

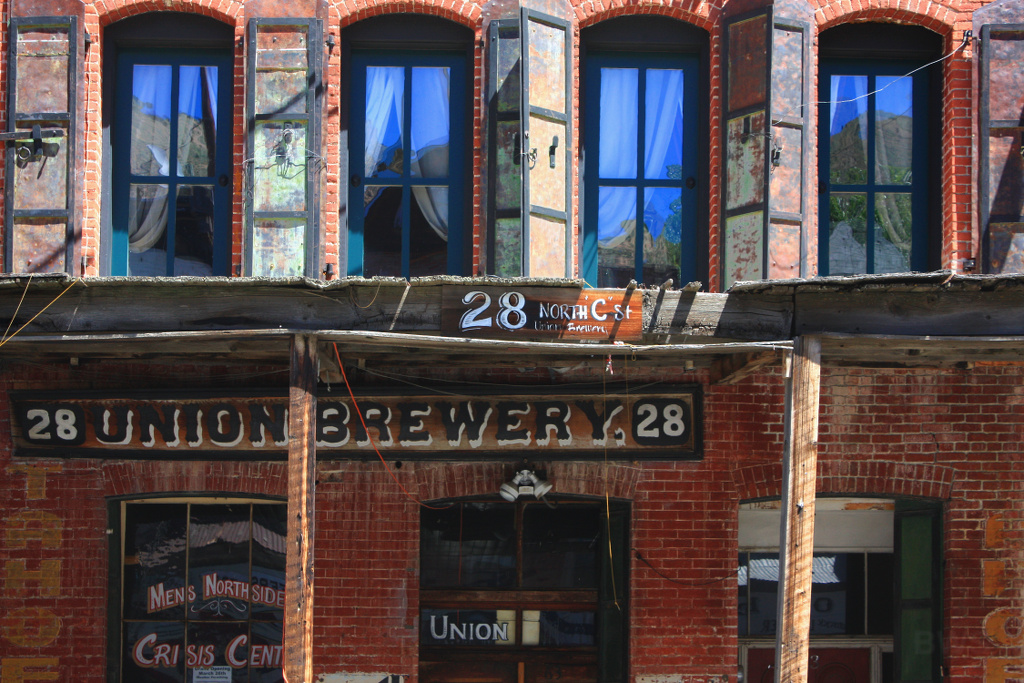
Union Brewery, c.1876

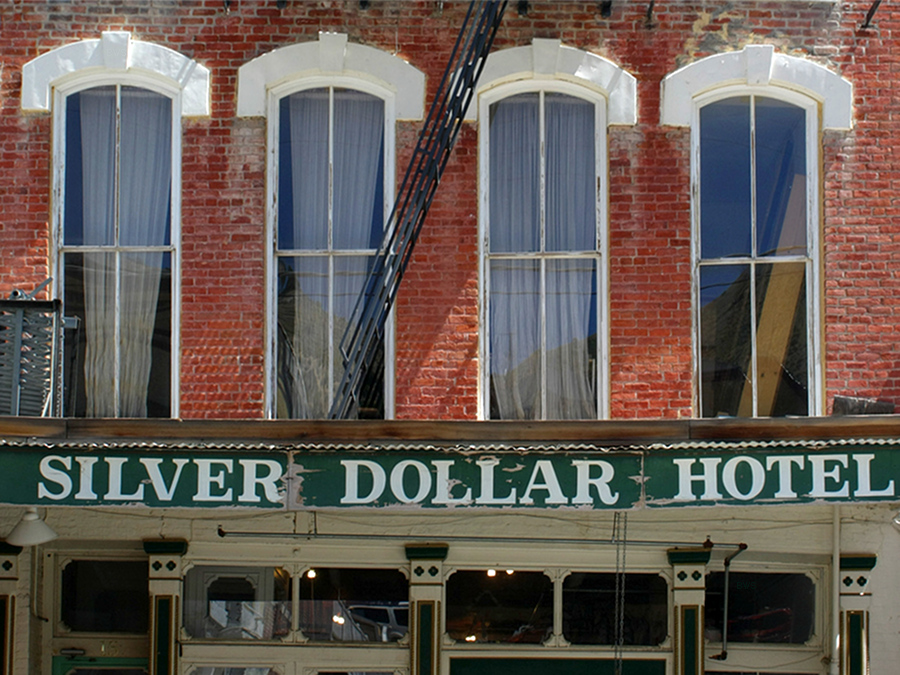
Silver Dollar Hotel, c.1876

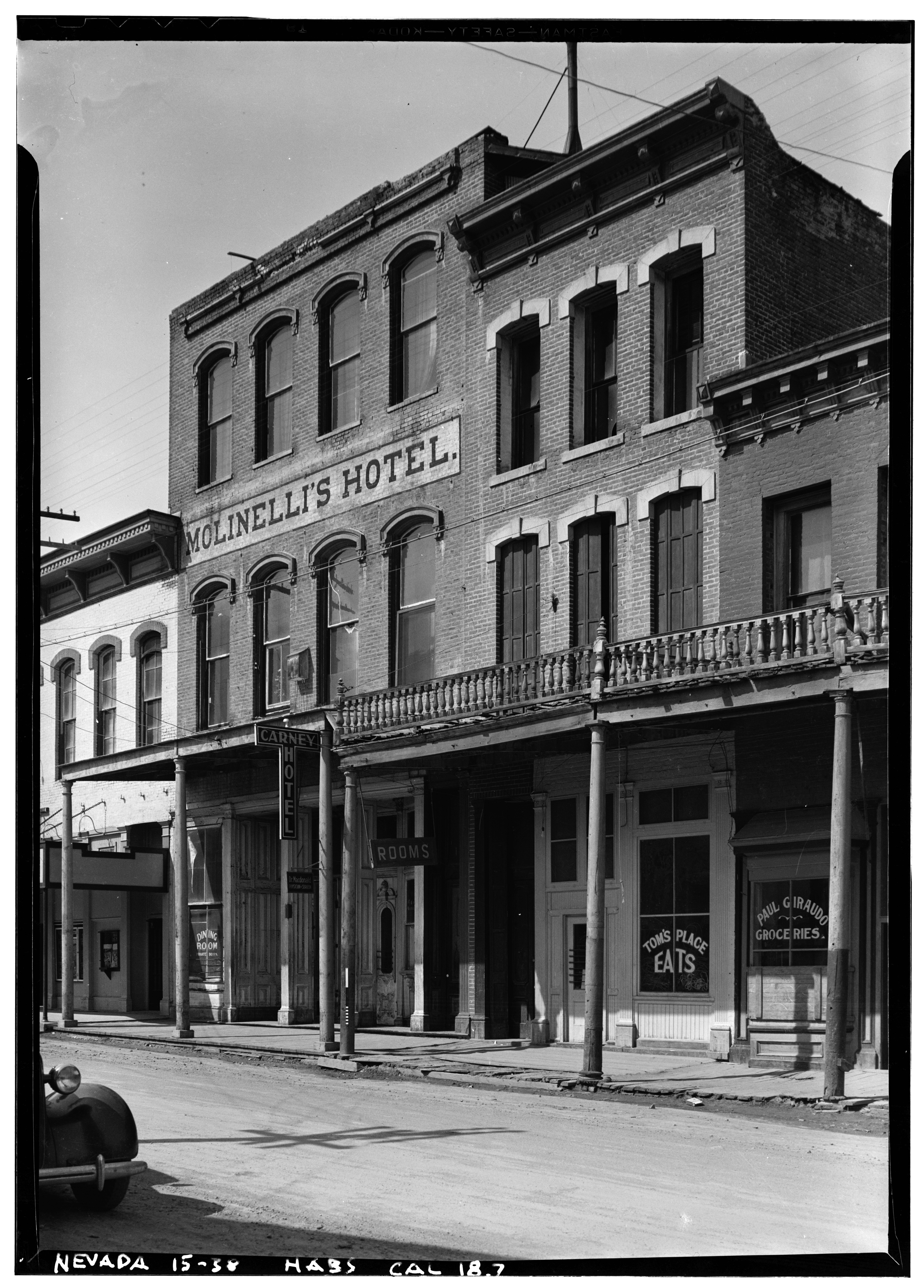
Molinelli's Hotel, c.1876

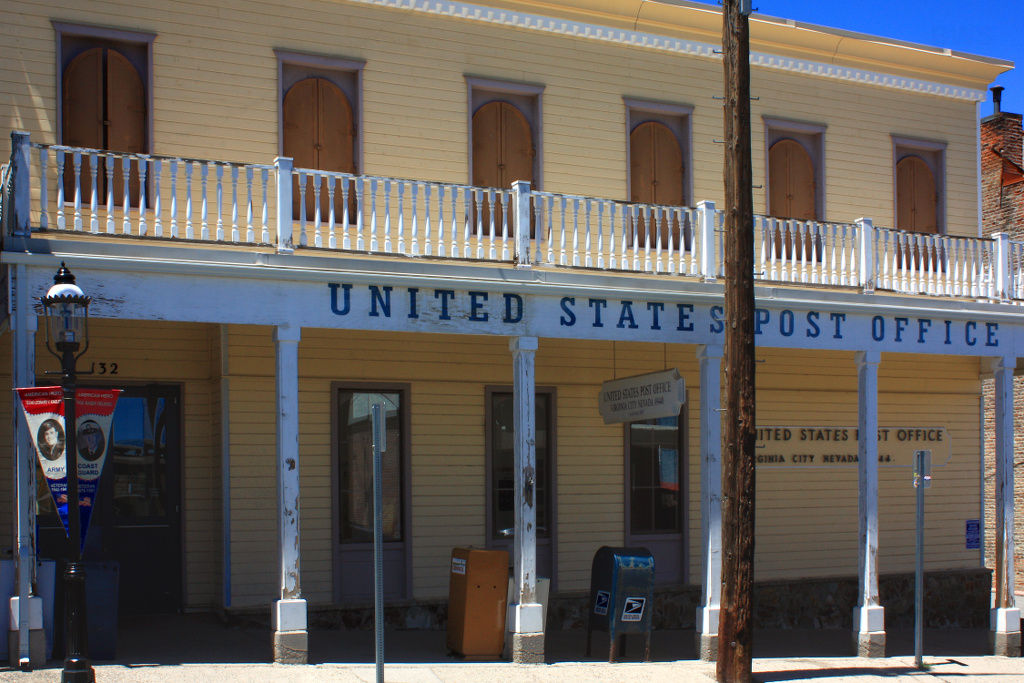
Post Office, c.1876

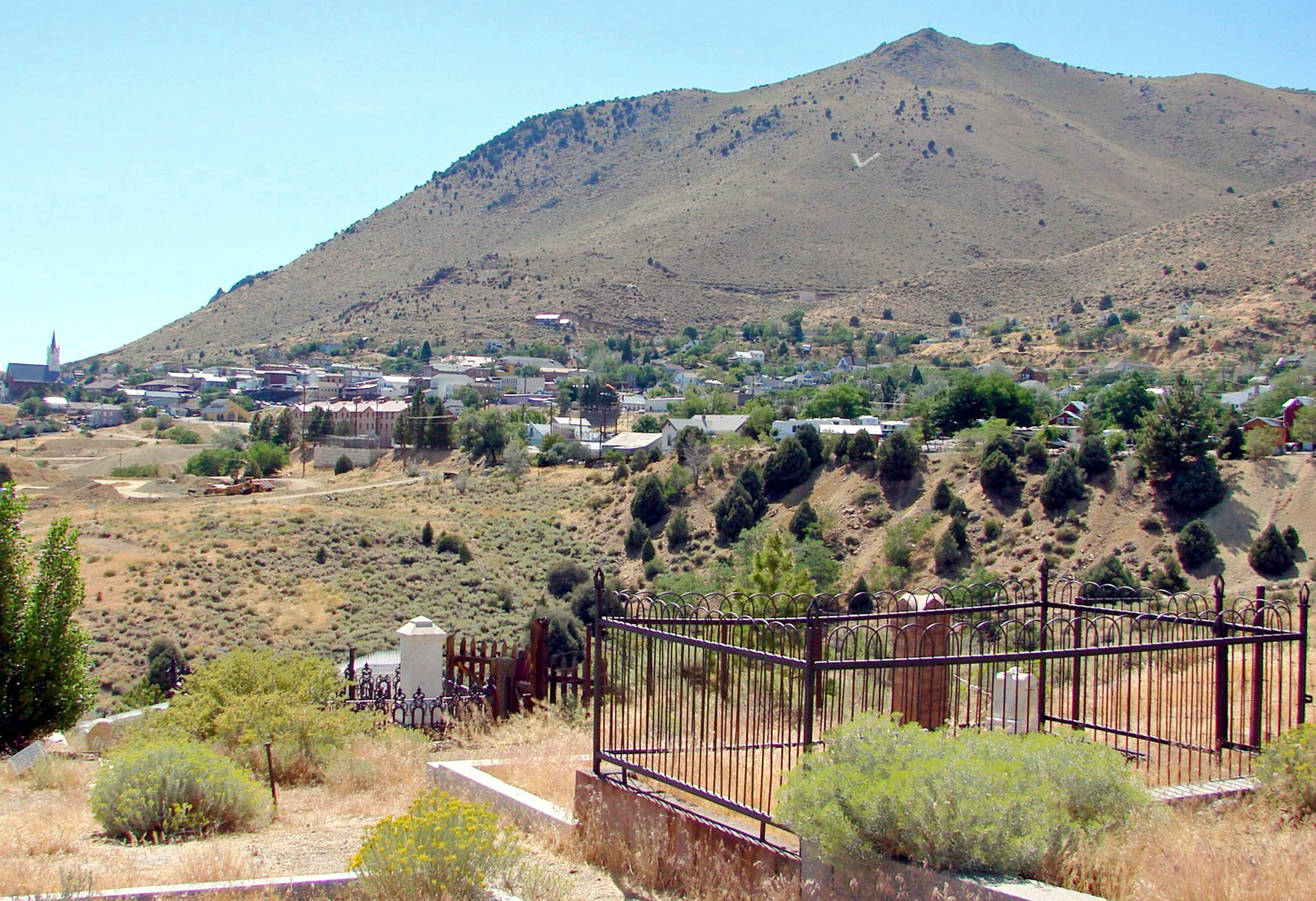
Cemetery

== See also ==
- List of National Historic Landmarks in Nevada
- National Register of Historic Places listings in Lyon County, Nevada
- National Register of Historic Places listings in Storey County, Nevada
