= St. Paul's Episcopal Church (Virginia City, Nevada) =

Historic church in Nevada, United States

- U.S. Historic district – Contributing property
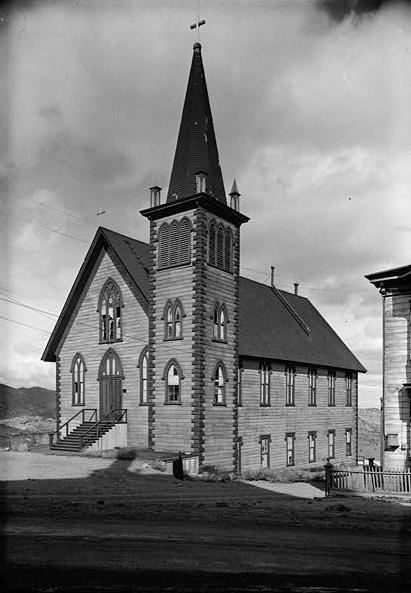
- St. Paul's Episcopal Church, March 1937

- Location within Nevada Location within the United States
- Location: F & Taylor Streets; Virginia City, Nevada
- Coordinates: 39°18′33″N 119°38′53″W
- Built: 1876
- Architectural style: Carpenter Gothic
- Part of: Virginia City Historic District (ID66000458)

St. Paul's Episcopal Church is a historic Carpenter Gothic-style Episcopal church building located at F and Taylor Streets in Virginia City, Nevada, United States. It was built in 1876 to replace an earlier church that had burned down in 1875. St Paul's Parish, founded on September 1, 1861, is still an active congregation in the Episcopal Diocese of Nevada.

St. Paul's Episcopal Church is a contributing property in the Virginia City Historic District which was declared a National Historic Landmark in 1961 and added to the National Register of Historic Places in 1966.

== See also ==
- National Register of Historic Places listings in Nevada
- St. Peter's Episcopal Church (Carson City, Nevada)
