= Piper's Opera House =

- U.S. National Register of Historic Places
- U.S. Historic district – Contributing property
- Nevada Historical Marker No. 236
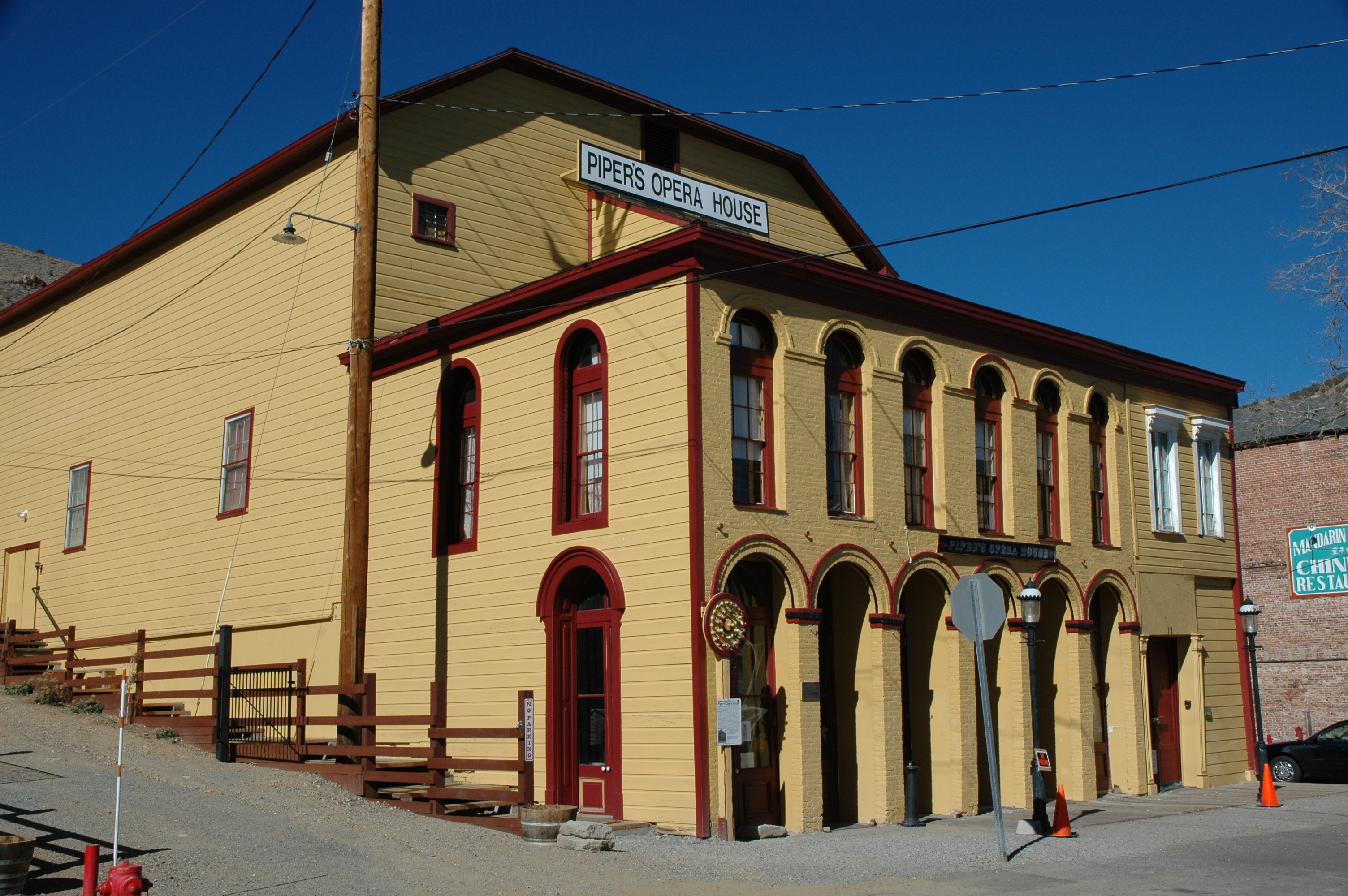

- Location within Nevada Location within the United States
- Location: Virginia City, Storey County, Nevada
- Coordinates: 39°18′39″N 119°39′06″W
- Built: 1885
- NRHP reference No.: 97000217
- Marker No.: 236
- Added to NRHP: March 21, 1997

Piper's Opera House is an historic performing arts venue in Virginia City, Storey County, Nevada, United States. Piper's served as a training facility in 1897 for heavyweight boxing champion Gentleman Jim Corbett, in preparation for his title bout with Bob Fitzsimmons. The current structure was built by entrepreneur John Piper in 1885 to replace his 1878 opera house that had burned down. The 1878 venue, in turn, had been to replace Piper's 1863 venue which was destroyed by the 1875 Great Fire in Virginia City. Mark Twain spoke from the original Piper's stage in 1866, and again a century later in the third venue, as portrayed by Hal Holbrook in his one-man play Mark Twain Tonight! A lynch mob hung a victim from the first venue's rafters in 1871. American theatrical producer David Belasco was stage manager at the second opera house before moving to New York City. Piper's opera houses played host to Shakespearean thespians such as Edwin Booth. Musical performers Lilly Langtry, Al Jolson and John Philip Sousa once performed here. In 1940, Errol Flynn auctioned off historic Piper memorabilia from the opera house stage, during a live NBC broadcast that coincided with the premiere of Flynn's new movie Virginia City.

== John Piper ==
German immigrant John Piper arrived in Virginia City as part of the 1860 Comstock Lode rush, after several years in San Francisco operating a liquor and seasonal fruit stand near San Francisco's theaters.

Through business acumen and a political career, Piper would become one of the richest men in 1870s Virginia City. Piper sat on the City Council in 1865, and was mayor of Virginia City in 1867. In 1874, Piper represented Storey County in the Nevada Senate. In an effort to raise money for Storey County to pay for railroad bonds, Piper managed to get the state senate to unanimously pass a bill that became law, removing the taxation limits on bullion in the county.

As a pioneer of western combination companies, touring actors who brought plays and variety shows from an originating theater to other regional venues, Piper became one the foremost theatrical impresarios of the region. Piper utilized a chain of venues to accommodate touring companies. Among these were McKissick's Opera House in Reno and the Carson Opera House in Carson City. As early as 1867, Piper toured his Piper's Opera House company to regional theaters following a pattern established by San Francisco's Thomas Maguire and later utilized by the California Theatre. The California Theater brought their stock company and numerous established stars to Virginia City on tour through numerous engagements. By 1874, every major player at Piper's Opera House was on their to or from San Francisco's California Theatre, the West's foremost theater. Those players included Lotta Crabtree, W.J. Florence, Agnes Booth, Dion Boucicault, and Frank Mayo

When Piper died in San Francisco at age 63, on January 3, 1897, he had spent more than 30 years in the theater business.

== Piper's three opera houses ==
=== 1863–1875 ===
An 1861 illustration by African American artist Grafton T. Brown depicts the John Piper Old Corner Bar at the southwest corner of B and Union Streets, which became the financial support of John and his brothers Henry and Joseph. In 1863, Piper expanded his holdings with the purchase of an entire block of additional property at the northwest corner of B and Union Streets, which came to be known as the multi-story Piper Business Block. The saloon lasted from 1861 to 1897 becoming one of the longest continually operating saloons in Virginia City. The second story of the building was rented out.

San Francisco theater impresario Thomas Maguire and partner John Burns opened Maguire's Opera House in 1863. Opening in July 1863, the Opera House was built on imported sandstone and emulated Maguire's San Francisco properties. Maguire's greatest achievement was the 29 day engagement of Adah Isaacs Menken. Adah Isaacs Menken appeared in the sensational, semi-nude character of Mazeppa, riding a live horse onstage over painted ramps simulating mountains. Piper took over the ownership of the theater in late February, 1867, leasing it to Max Walter. On October 9, 1867, Piper and his financial sponsor John William Mackay completed the sale of the theater. On October 30, 1866, Mark Twain delivered a lecture from its stage, returning on a speaking tour also in 1868. The opera house played host to Shakespearean thespians Junius Brutus Booth Jr brother of Edwin Booth, Thomas R. Keene, Lawrence Barrett and John Edward McCullough.

Through partnerships and agreements with San Francisco's California Theatre Piper's original D Street Opera House came to be recognized as one of the best American Theaters. 1868 was a banner year for theatricalities as Piper's hosted Elizabeth Crocker Bowers performing as Mrs. D. P. Bowers, the Queen of the American Stage, in a twenty-day run as well as two engagements by Charles Wheatleigh, a regional favorite well-versed in plays by Dion Boucicault, and others.

In 1871, actor McKee Rankin reportedly became a witness to an act of vigilante justice during an extended engagement at Piper's although newspapers of the time do not support his memories recorded many years later. Rankin and fellow thespian William H. Powers were at the bar next to the troupe's International Hotel headquarters, when a customer named Arthur Perkins shot another customer and was jailed by the local sheriff. Two days later, on a Sunday morning, Rankin said that he witnessed the lynching of Perkins at the hands of a vigilante mob who hung Perkins from the rafters of the Piper stage. The mob also pulled out their guns and shot Perkins' dangling body. A far more trustworthy source, newspaperman Alf Doten, recalled that Perkins was dragged from a jail by vigilantes who took him the old Orphir works above A street and hung him from an old mining trestle. Doten's recollections dismiss the notion that the Opera House location figured in Perkins' death.

The opera house, along with most of Virginia City, burned to the ground on the morning of October 26, 1875, an event known as the Great Fire. Piper promoted shows at other venues until he was financially able to erect a new building. Actors Frank Mayo (Davy Crockett) and Joe Jefferson (Rip Van Winkle) toured the West in the late 1870s bringing their acclaimed productions to Piper's.

=== 1878–1883 ===
Piper built his new opera house for $40,000 in 1878 adjacent to his bar at B and Union streets. The new Opera House opened January 28, 1878. In May of that same year, an eight-year-old Maude Adams played the character of Adrienne Renaud in A Celebrated Case when the play's troupe performed in Virginia City. American theatrical producer David Belasco had a storied relationship with the original Piper's Opera House performing as a supporting player there in 1873 and 4. Appearing at the time of Dion Boucicault's engagement in 1874, Belasco later published sensationalized memories of that time making manager John Piper famous for his questionable management strategies. Belasco reportedly served as stage manager before moving to New York City in 1882. Minister and social reformer Henry Ward Beecher delivered his lecture of Wastes and Burdens of Society from its stage. The new opera house burned down March 13, 1883, quickly being rebuilt. The 1885 structure still stands.

=== 1885: current opera house ===
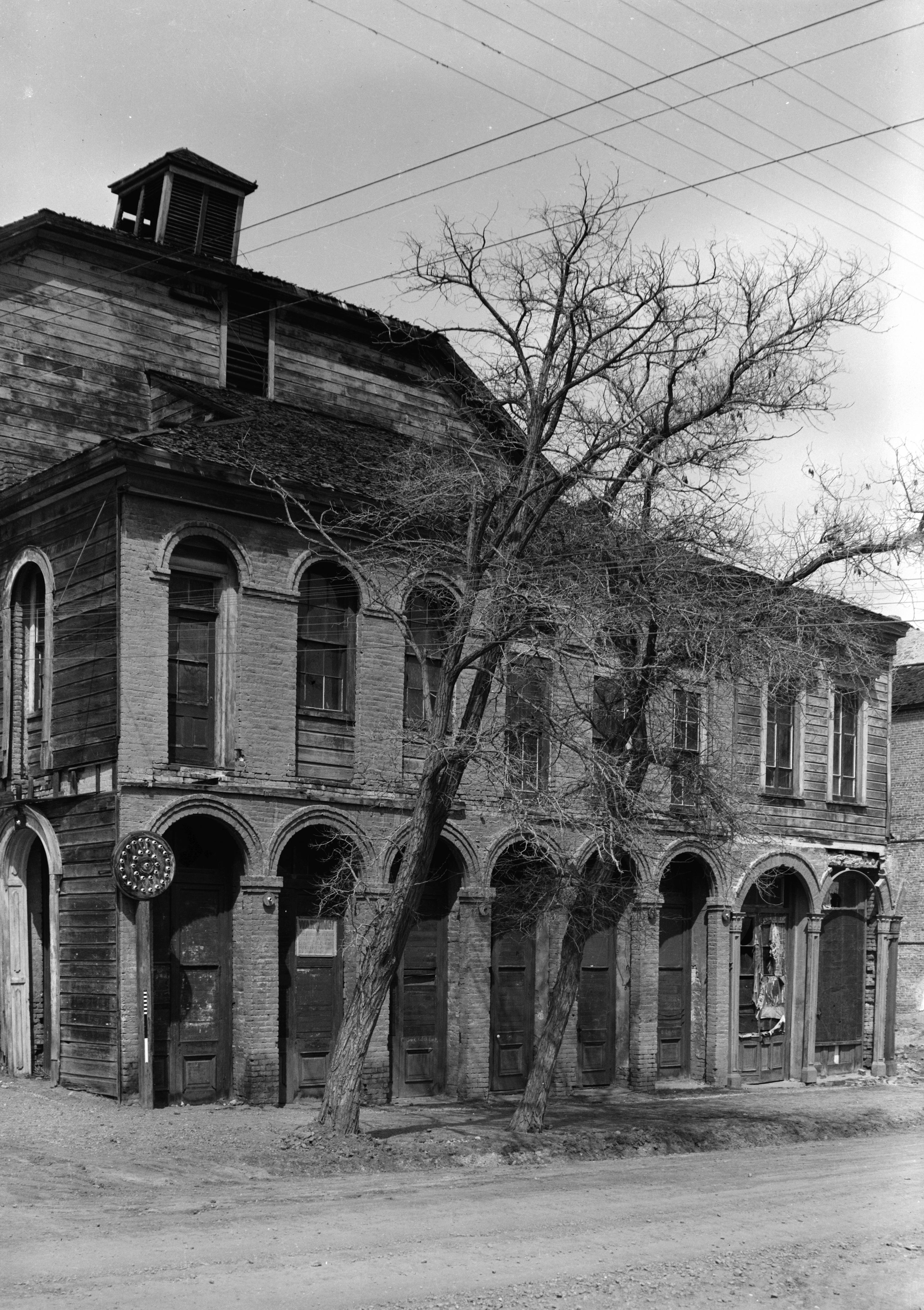
Piper's Opera House, 1937

Within days of the 1883 fire, Piper had rented Cooper's Hall and began presenting entertainment acts, raising capital to build a new opera house. Piper celebrated the opening of the currently existing opera house on March 6, 1885, with a grand ball. Piper's new building was modernized with a dance floor, carpeting, and hanging balconies. Musical performers Lilly Langtry, John Philip Sousa, Emma Nevada and Al Jolson were among the entertainers in the historic arena.

After John Piper died in 1897, his son Edward inherited the opera house and continued its operation until his death in 1907. During Edward's ownership, the opera house transformed from gas to electric lighting in 1900. Nevada tenor Richard Jose performed at Piper's in 1905. Heavyweight boxing champion Gentleman Jim Corbett used the venue as a training facility to prepare for his 1897 title bout with Bob Fitzsimmons.

Upon Edward's death, his brother-in-law Louis Zimmer used it as a silent movie house. The venue was also rented out for sports, community socials and civic events. The building was condemned in the 1920s. On March 16, 1940, Errol Flynn arrived in town for the premiere of his new movie Virginia City. The movie's cast and crew, along with attending media outlets, gathered at the opera house for a live NBC broadcast of Flynn auctioning off historic Piper memorabilia. After the movie premiere, Zimmer operated the venue as a museum until 1960.

After Zimmer's 1960 death, Piper's great-great-granddaughter Louise Zimmer Driggs opened the venue to summer chamber music concerts until 1972. Sixteen years later, Driggs' daughter Carol Piper Marshall, trained in classic opera at Curtis Institute of Music in Philadelphia, resumed management and opened the venue to entertainment once again. She died March 1, 2006. Mark Twain, as portrayed by Hal Holbrook in his one-man play Mark Twain Tonight!, trod the boards to a sold-out audience at Piper's. Tennessee Ernie Ford was another act at Pipers during this period.

== Restoration ==
Louise Zimmer Driggs, began restoration work on the opera house in the 1960s. She sold Piper's in 1997 to the non-profit Piper's Opera House Historic Programs. Grants from the Nevada Department of Cultural Affairs, and a National Park Service Save America's Treasures grant, have enabled structural reinforcements and renovations.
