= Train =

Series of connected rail vehicles

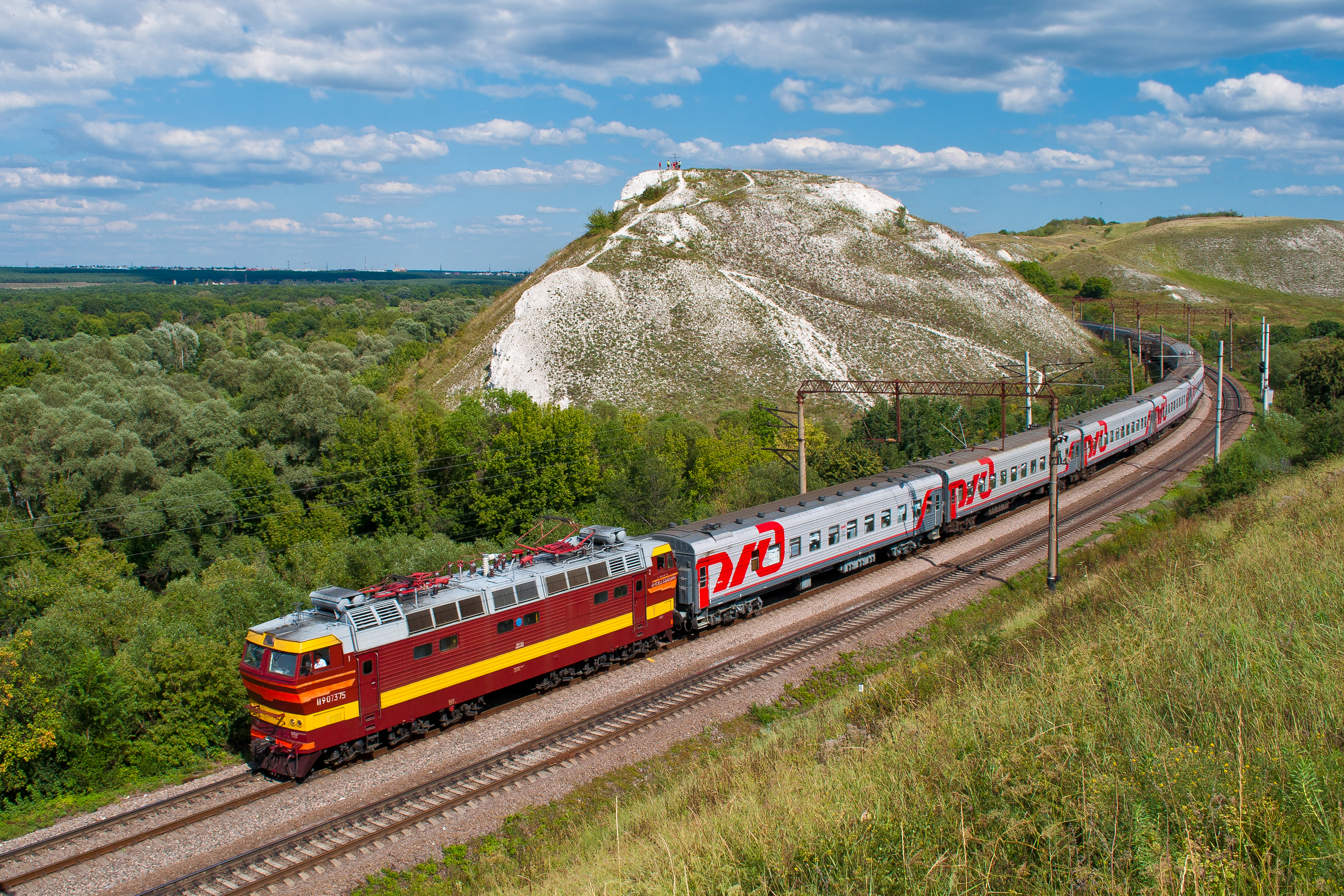
An electric locomotive pulling a passenger train in Russia

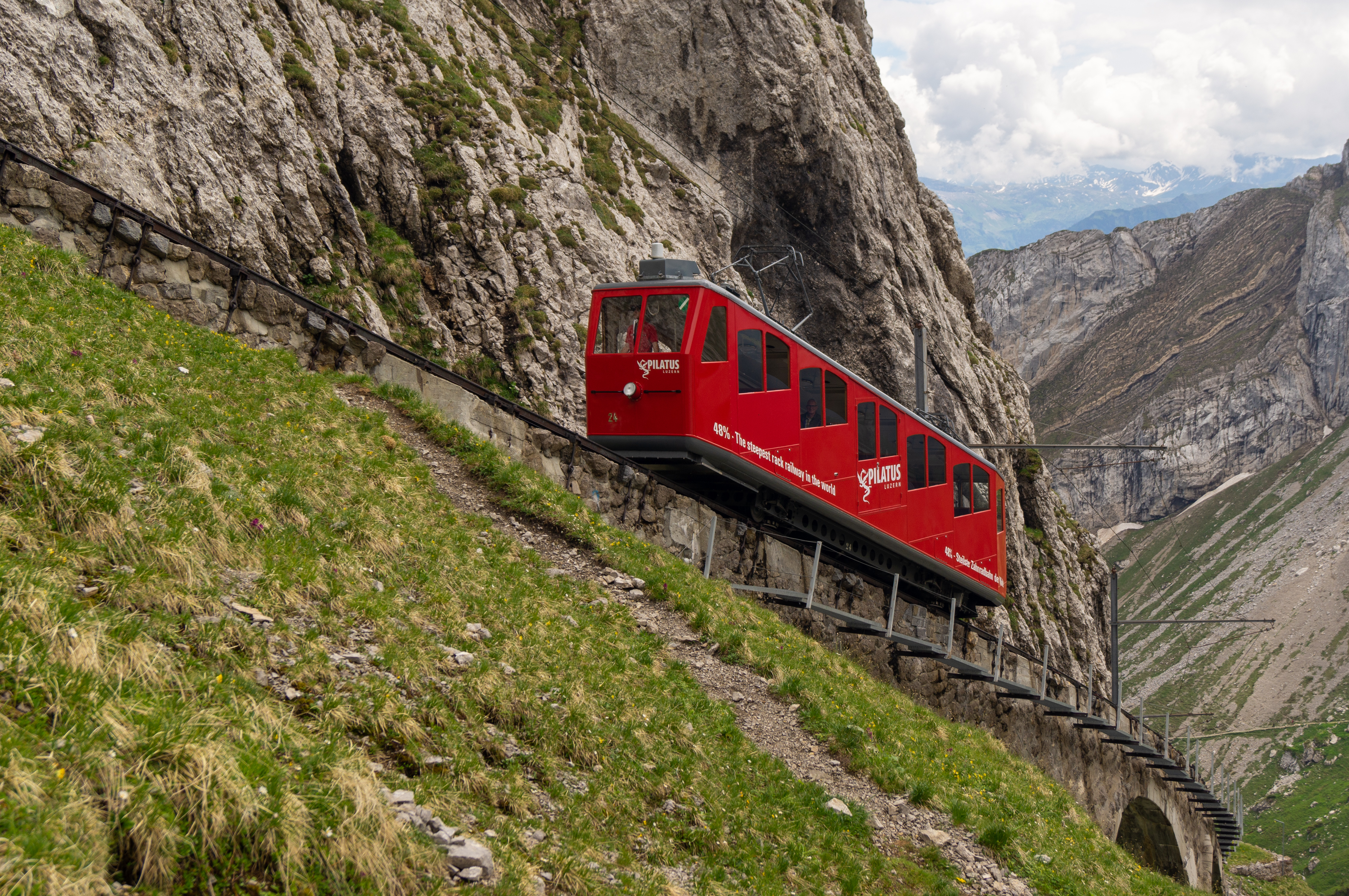
A rack railway in Switzerland

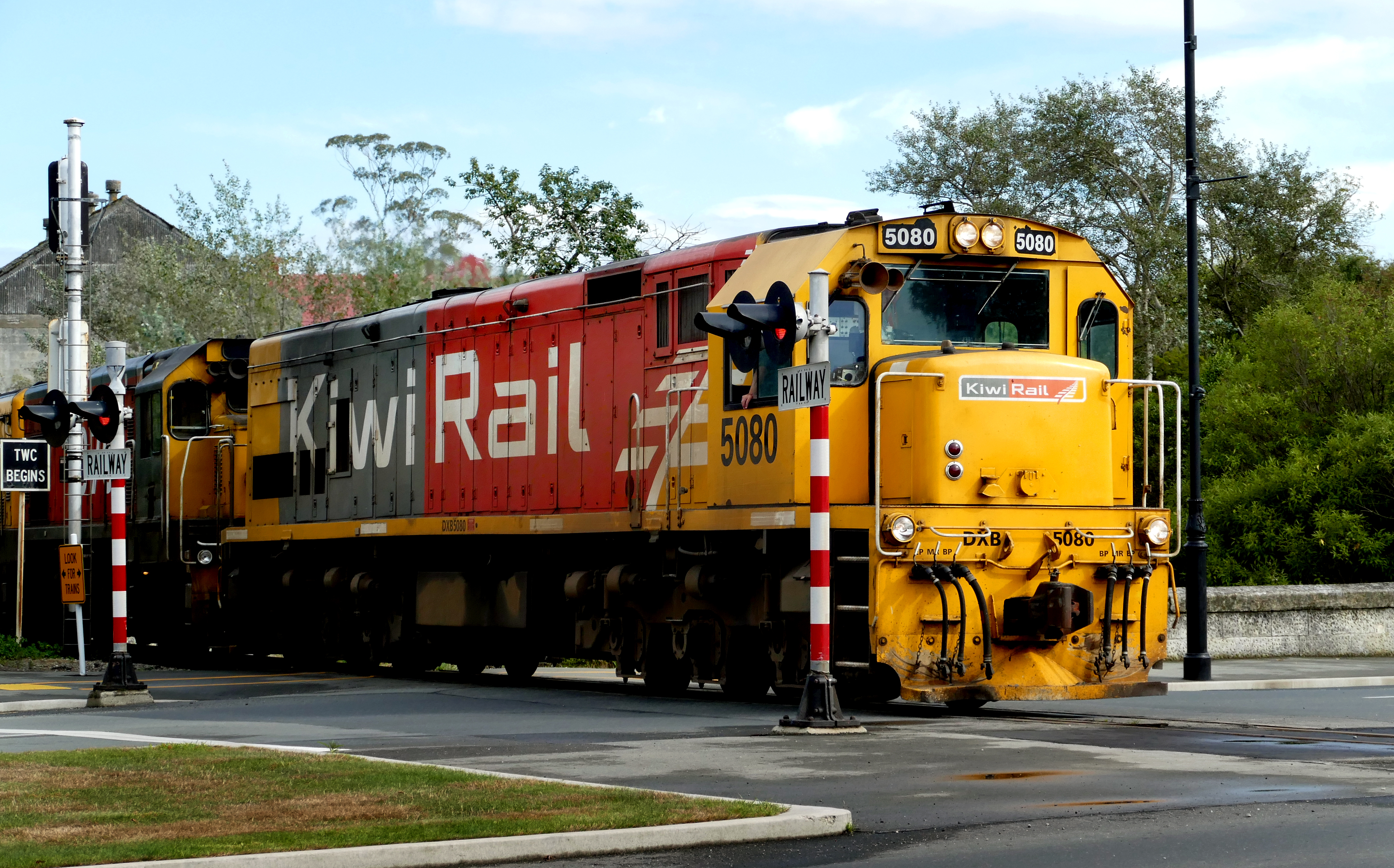
Diesel locomotives pulling a freight train in New Zealand

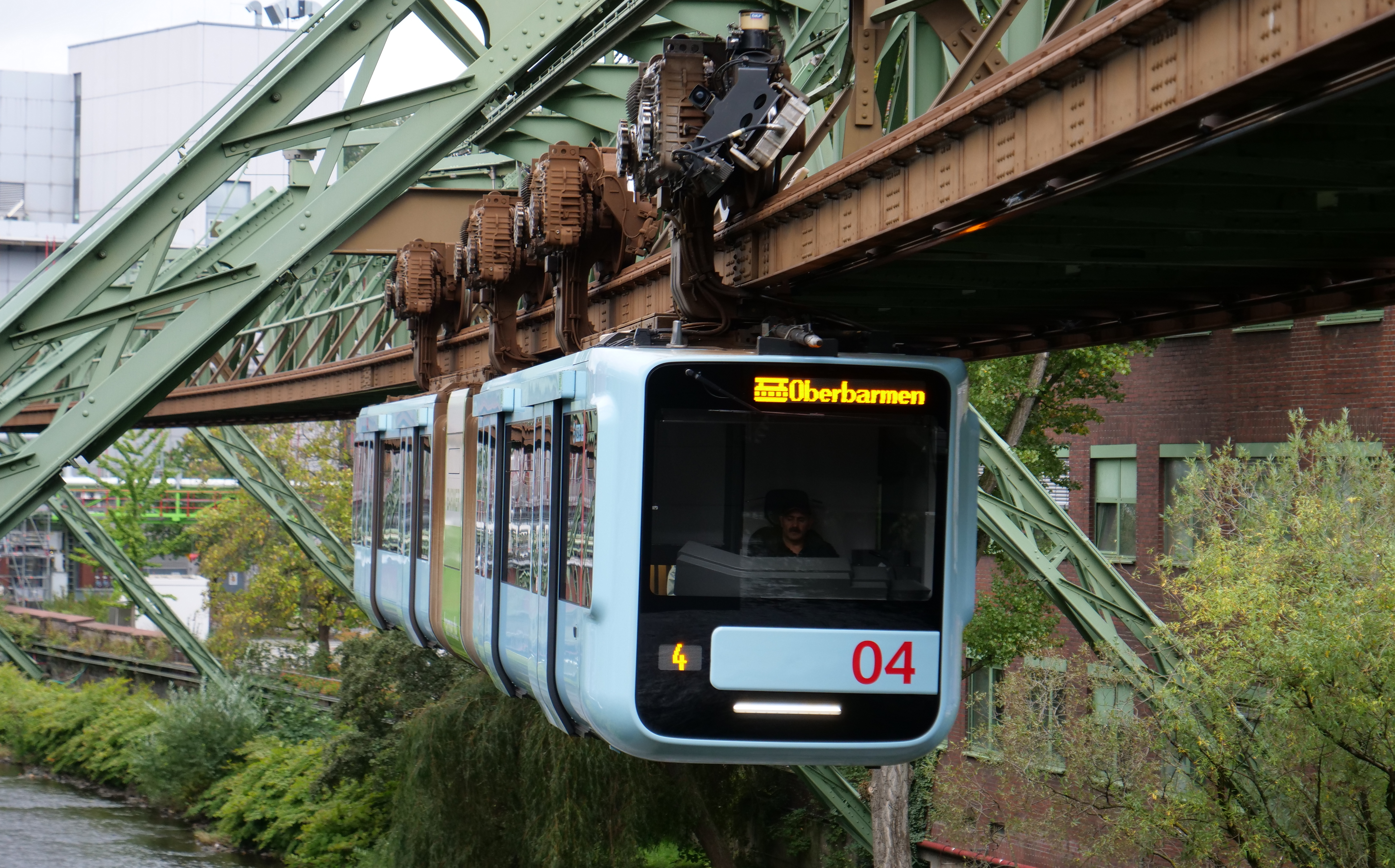
A suspended monorail in Germany

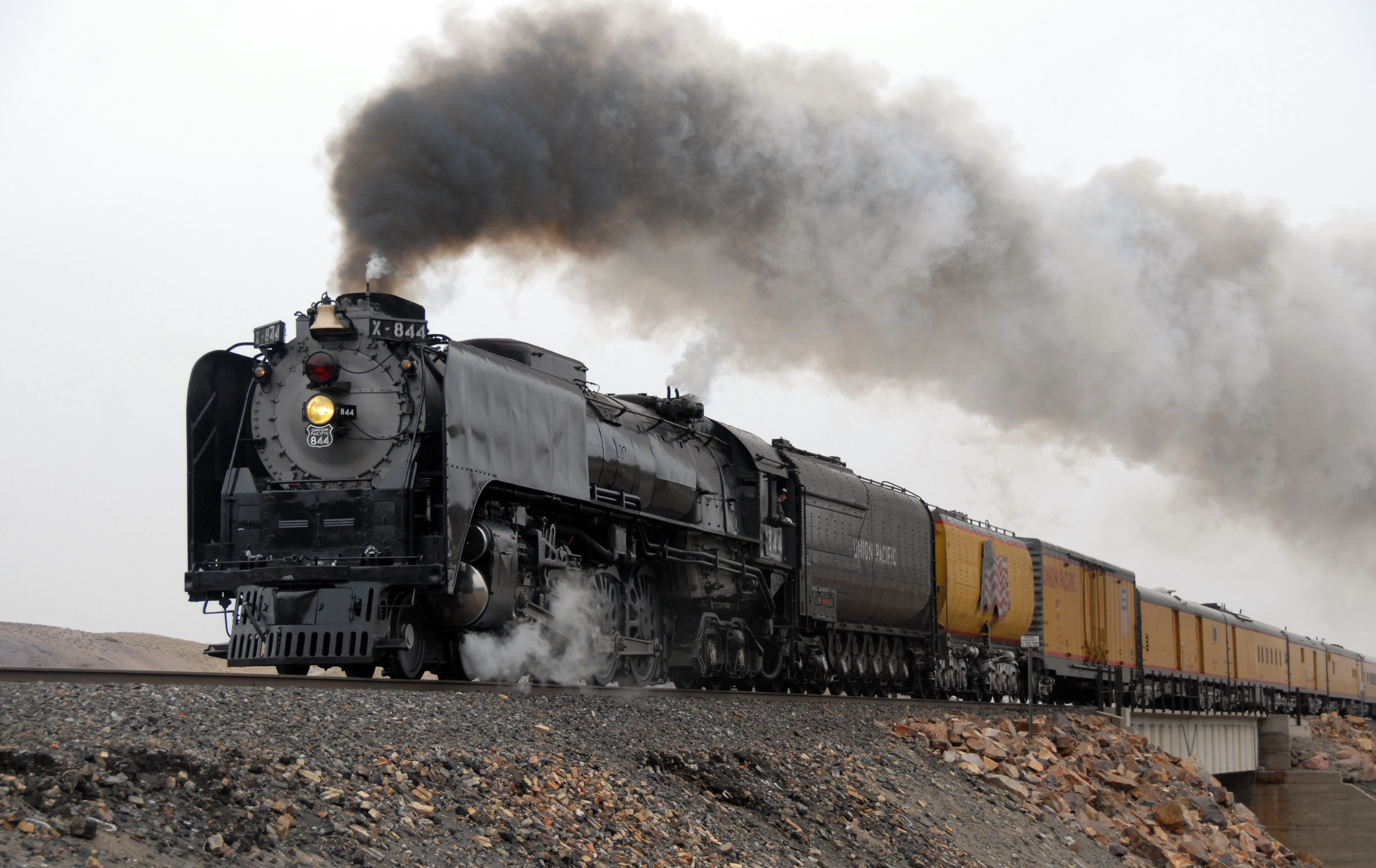
A restored steam locomotive in the United States

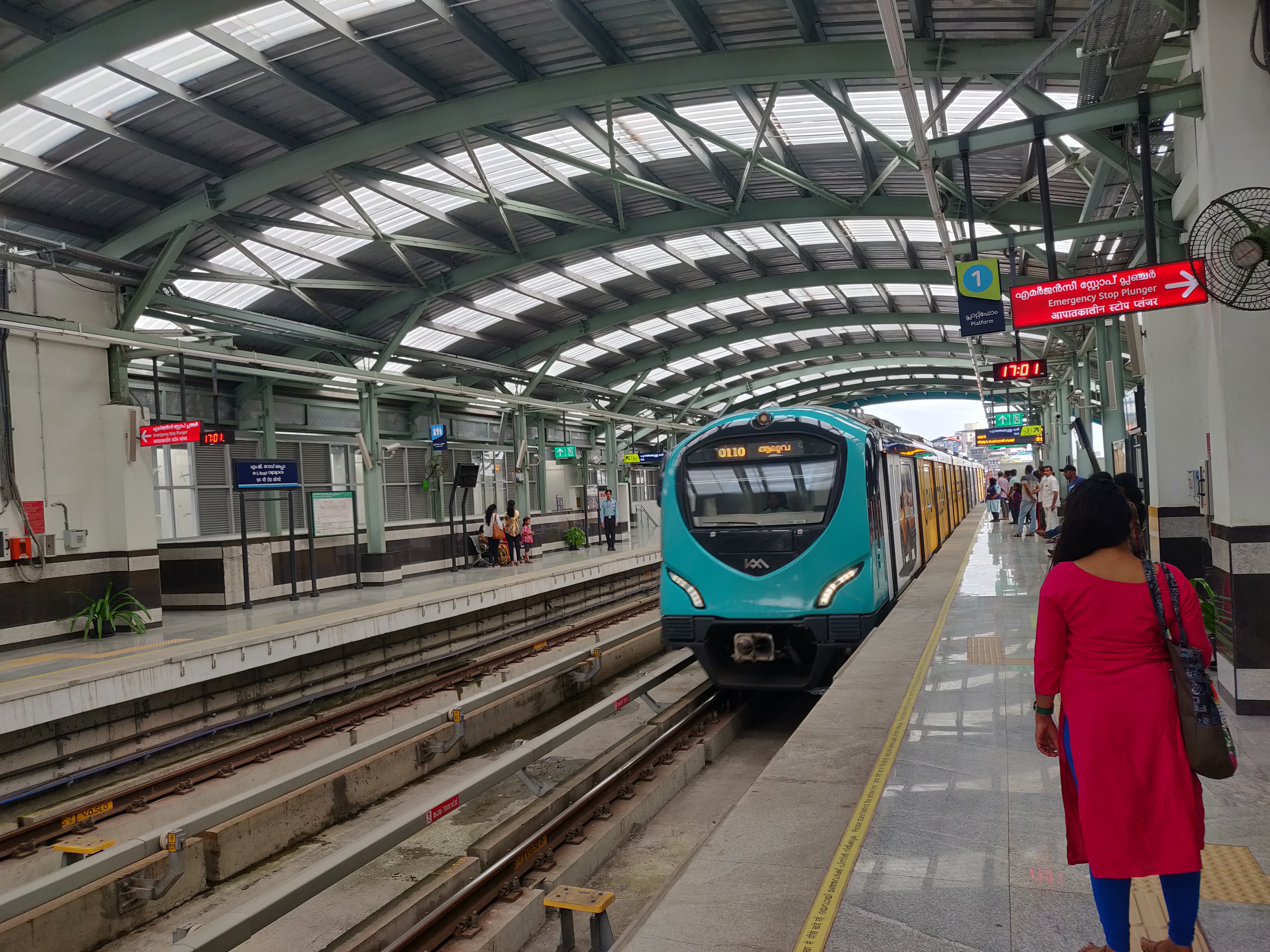
A metro train in Kerala, India

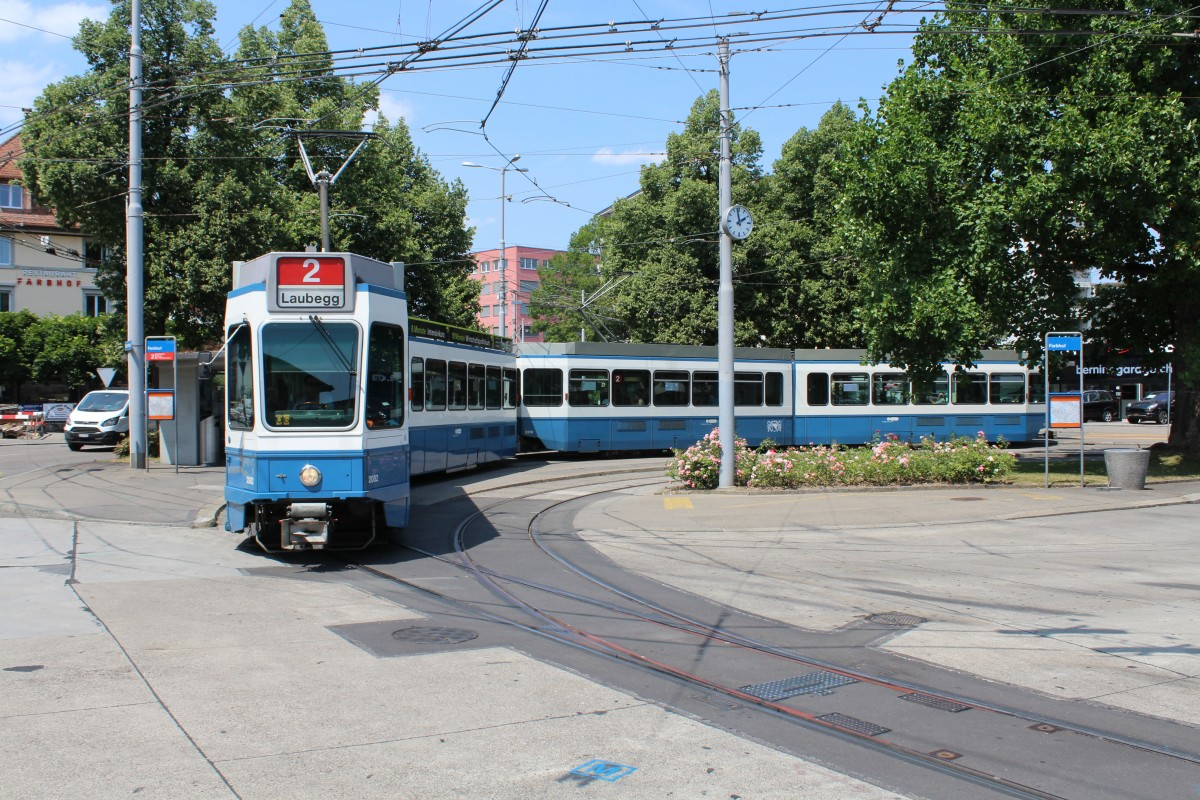
A tram in Switzerland

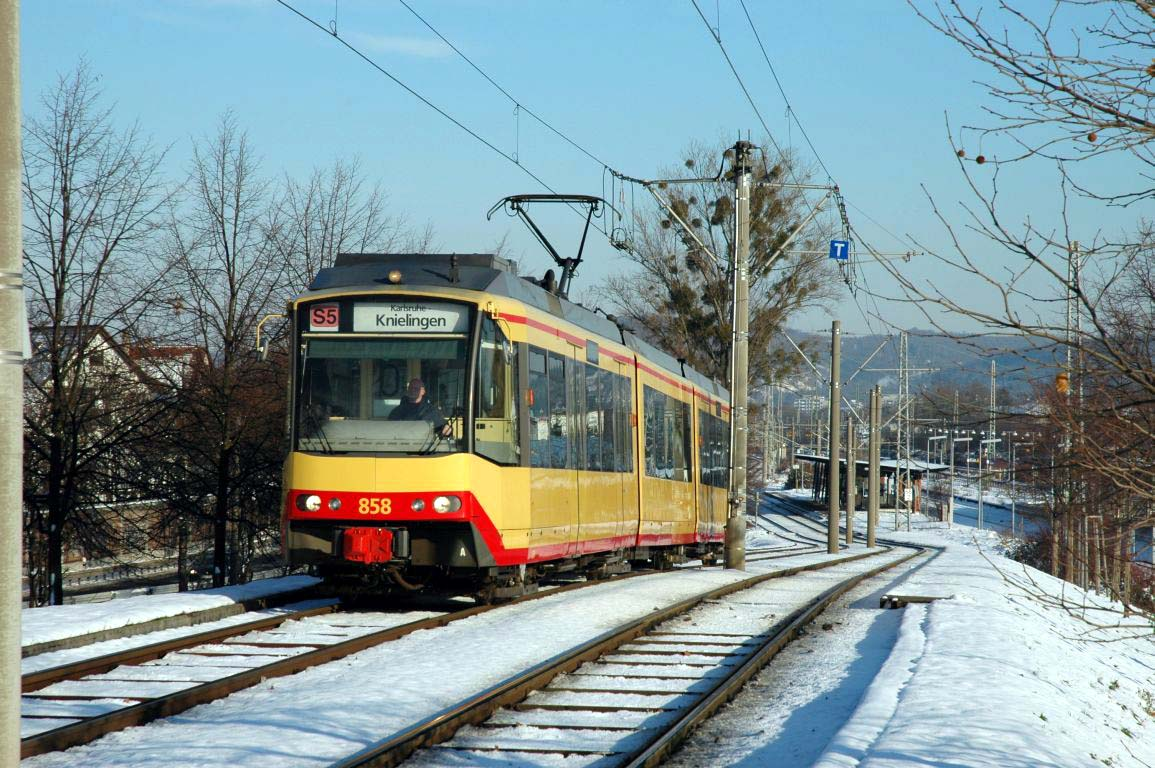
A light rail trainset in Germany

A train (from Old French trahiner, from Latin trahere, "to pull, to draw") is a series of connected vehicles that run along a railway track and transport people or freight. Trains are typically pulled or pushed by locomotives (often known simply as "engines"), though some are self-propelled, such as multiple units or railcars. Passengers and cargo are carried in railroad cars, also known as wagons or carriages. Trains are designed to a certain gauge, or distance between rails. Most trains operate on steel tracks with steel wheels, the low friction of which makes them more efficient than other forms of transport. Many countries use rail transport.

Trains have their roots in wagonways, which used railway tracks and were powered by horses or pulled by cables. Following the invention of the steam locomotive in the United Kingdom in 1802, trains rapidly spread around the world, allowing freight and passengers to travel over land faster and more cheaply than ever before. Rapid transit and tram systems were first built in the late 1800s to transport large numbers of people in and around cities. Beginning in the 1920s, and accelerating following World War II, diesel and electric locomotives replaced steam as the means of motive power. Following the development of cars, trucks, and extensive networks of highways which offered greater mobility, as well as faster airplanes, trains declined in importance and market share, and many rail lines were abandoned. The spread of buses led to the closure of many rapid transit and tram systems during this time as well.

Since the 1970s, governments, environmentalists, and train advocates have promoted increased use of trains due to their greater fuel efficiency and lower greenhouse gas emissions compared to other modes of land transport. High-speed rail, first built in the 1960s, has proven competitive with cars and planes for short- to medium-distance travel. Commuter rail has grown in importance since the 1970s as an alternative to congested highways and a means to promote development, as has light rail in the 21st century. Freight trains remain important for the transport of bulk commodities such as coal and grain, as well as for reducing road traffic congestion caused by freight trucks.

While conventional trains operate on relatively flat tracks with two rails, many specialized trains operate in significantly different ways. Monorails operate on a single rail, while funiculars and rack railways are uniquely designed to traverse steep slopes. Experimental trains such as high-speed maglevs, which use magnetic levitation to float above a guideway, have been under development since the 1970s and can reach speeds higher than even the fastest conventional trains. Trains that use alternative fuels such as natural gas and hydrogen are a 21st-century development.

== Types and terminology ==
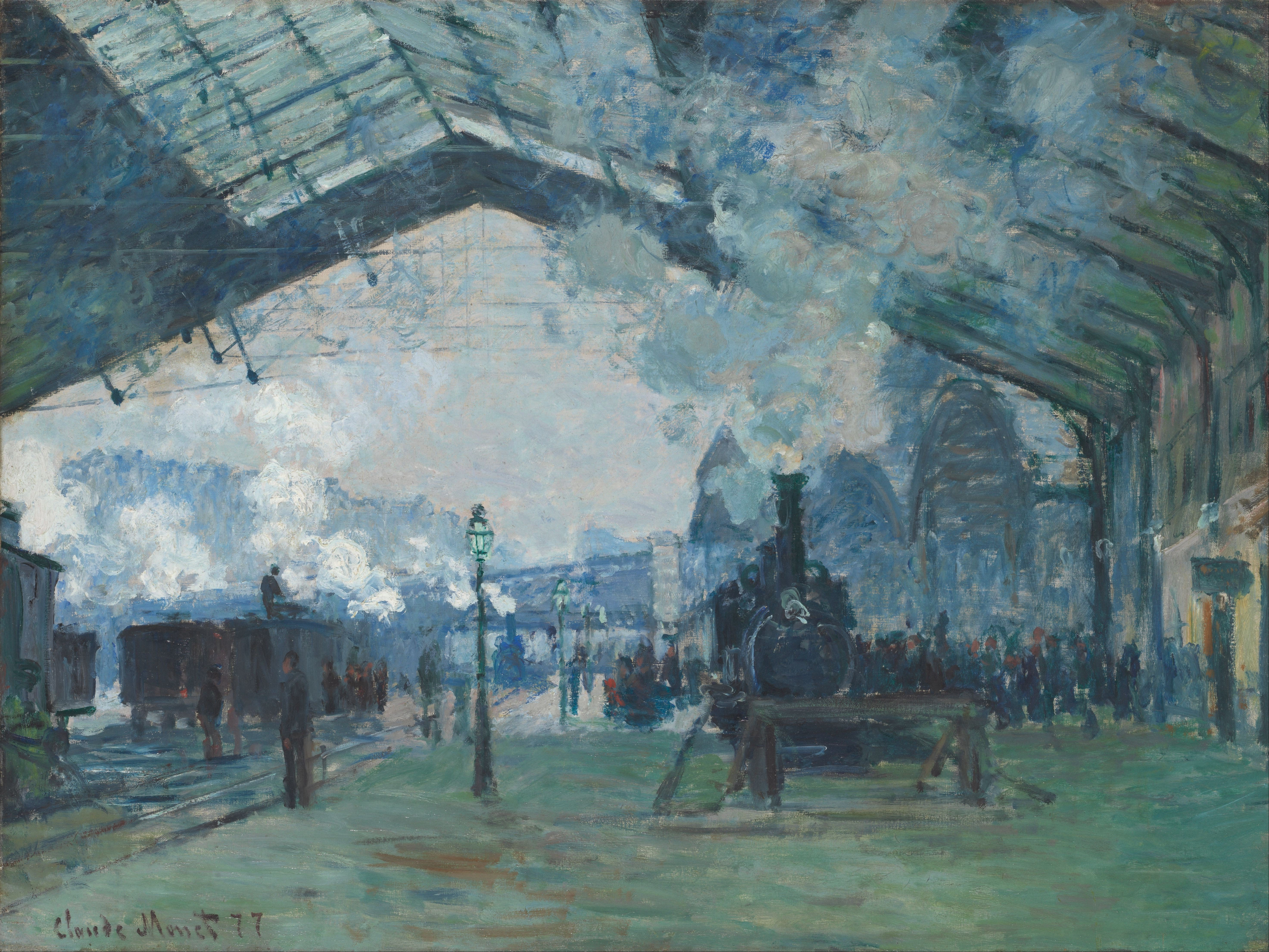
Arrival of the Normandy Train, Gare Saint-Lazare, by Claude Monet, 1877, Art Institute of Chicago

Trains can be sorted into types based on whether they haul passengers or freight (though mixed trains which haul both exist), by their weight (heavy rail for regular trains, light rail for lighter transit systems), by their speed (low speed and high speed), by their distance (short haul, long distance, transcontinental), and by what form of track they use. Conventional trains operate on two rails, but several other types of track systems are also in use around the world, such as monorail.

=== Terminology ===
The railway terminology that is used to describe a train varies between countries. The International Union of Railways seeks to provide standardized terminology across languages. The Association of American Railroads provides terminology for North America. Terms include:

- Train (Britain): a light locomotive, self-propelled rail vehicle or road–rail vehicle in rail mode.
- Train (United States): a connected line of railroad cars with or without a locomotive.
- Rolling stock (many jurisdictions): any railway vehicle.
- Rake (Britain): a collection of passenger or freight vehicles connected (not necessarily with a locomotive).
- Consist (North America and Australia): a train, locomotive(s), cut of cars, or any single car not coupled to another car or locomotive.
- Trainset (many jurisdictions): a set of vehicles that are permanently coupled together (such as the TGV, ICE or Pioneer Zephyr).

== History ==
=== Early history ===
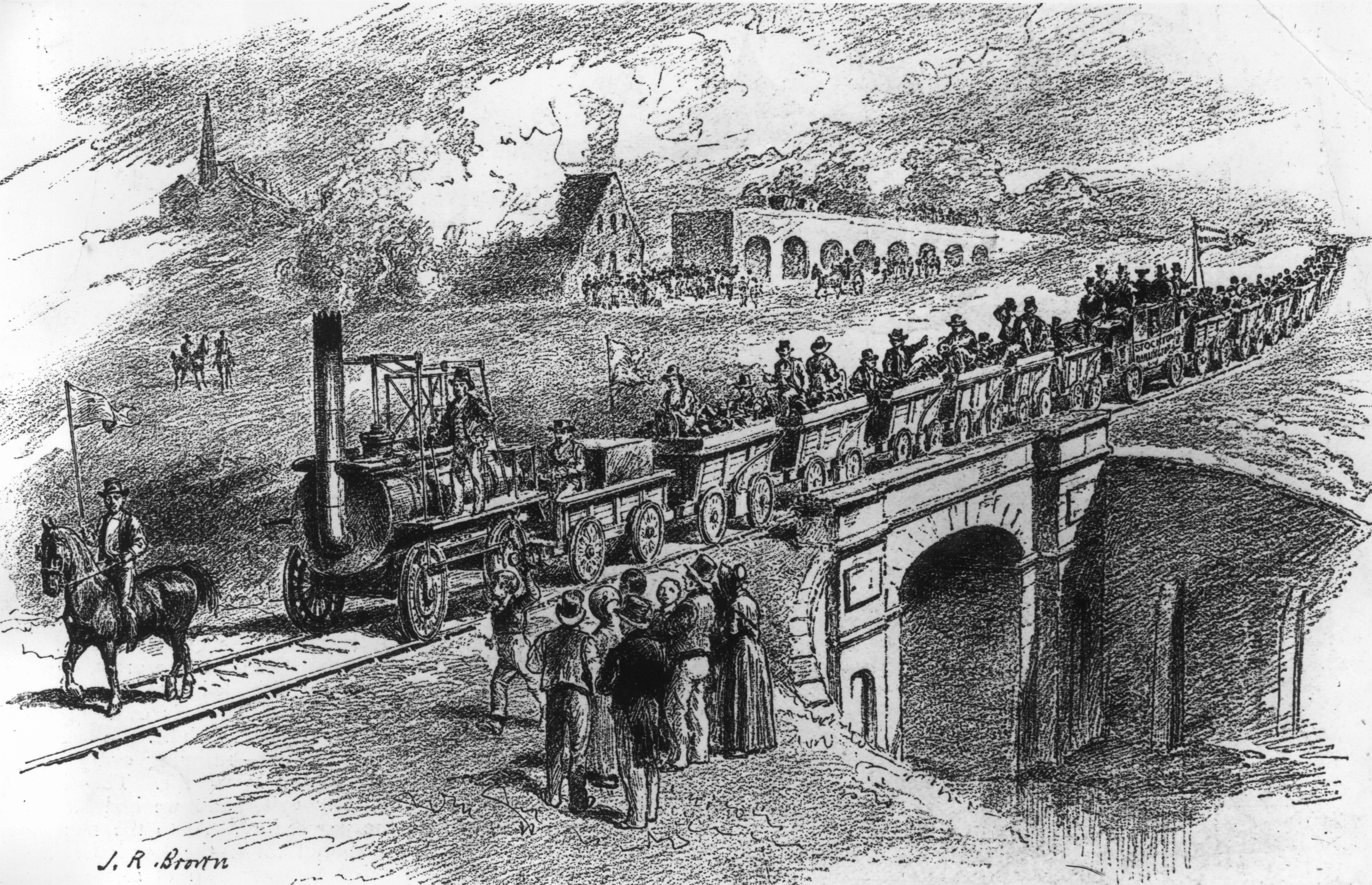
Stockton and Darlington special inaugural train 1825: six wagons of coal, directors coach, then people in wagons.

Trains are an evolution of wheeled wagons running on stone wagonways, the earliest of which were built by Babylon circa 2,200 BCE. Starting in the 1500s, wagonways were introduced to haul material from mines; from the 1790s, stronger iron rails were introduced. Following early developments in the second half of the 1700s, in 1804 a steam locomotive built by British inventor Richard Trevithick powered the first ever steam train. Outside of coal mines, where fuel was readily available, steam locomotives remained untried until the opening of the Stockton and Darlington Railway in 1825. British engineer George Stephenson ran a steam locomotive named Locomotion No. 1 on this 40-kilometer (25-mile) long line, hauling over 400 passengers at up to 13 kilometers per hour (8 mph). The success of this locomotive and Stephenson's Rocket in 1829 convinced many of the value of steam locomotives, and within a decade, the stock market bubble known as "Railway Mania" spread across the United Kingdom.

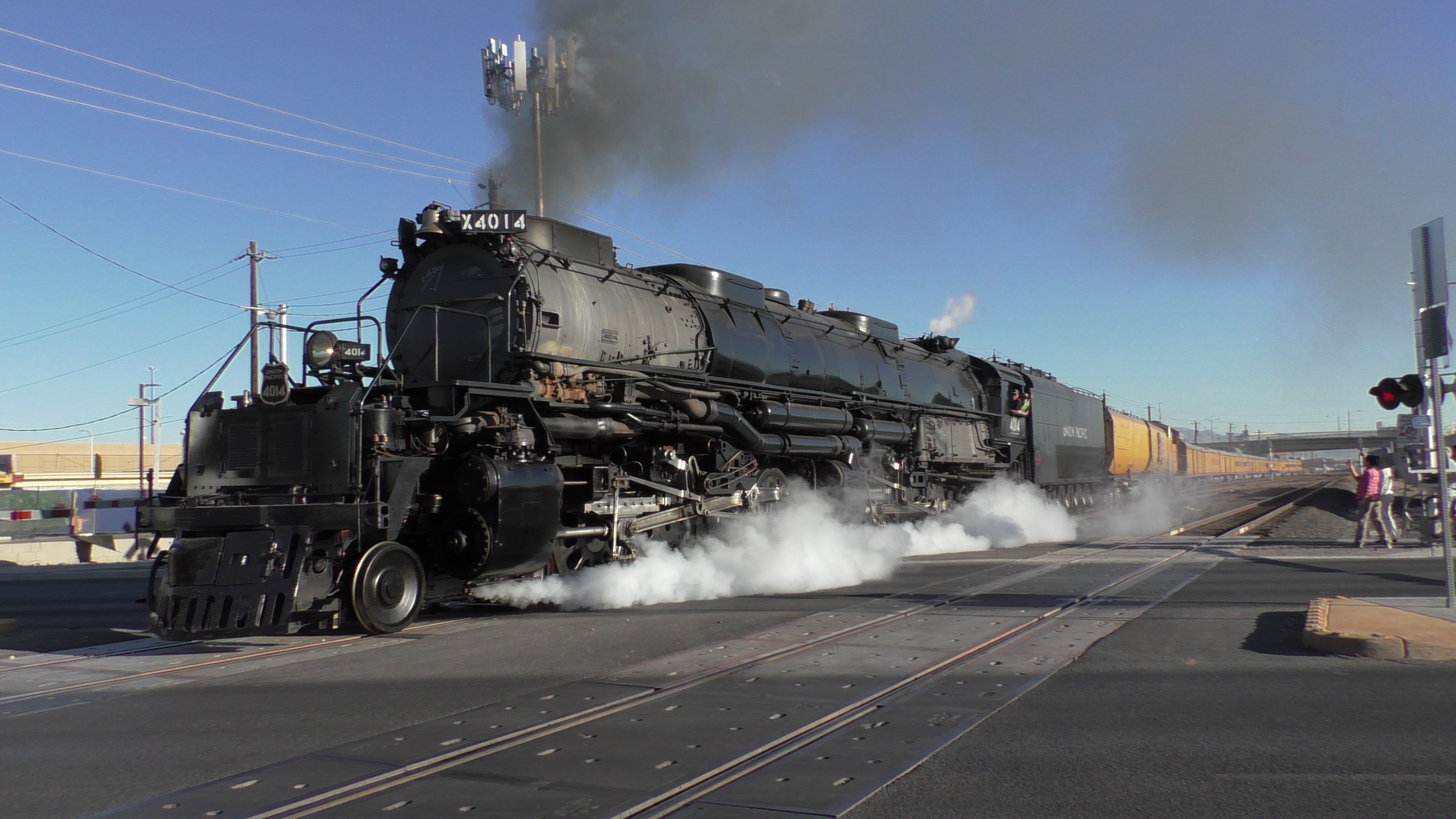
The Union Pacific Big Boy locomotives represented the pinnacle of steam locomotive technology and power.

News of the success of steam locomotives quickly reached the United States, where the first steam railroad opened in 1829. Railroad pioneers in the United States soon started manufacturing their own locomotives, designed to handle the sharper curves and rougher track typical of the country's railroads. The other nations of Europe also took note of British railroad developments, and most countries on the continent constructed and opened their first railroads in the 1830s and 1840s, following the first run of a steam train in France in late 1829. In the 1850s, trains continued to expand across Europe, with many influenced by or purchases of locomotive designs from the United States. Other European countries pursued their own distinct designs. Around the world, steam locomotives grew larger and more powerful throughout the rest of the century as technology advanced.

Trains first entered service in South America, Africa, and Asia through construction by imperial powers, which starting in the 1840s built railroads to solidify control of their colonies and transport cargo for export. In Japan, which was never colonized, railroads first arrived in the early 1870s. By 1900, railroads were operating on every continent besides uninhabited Antarctica.

=== New technologies ===
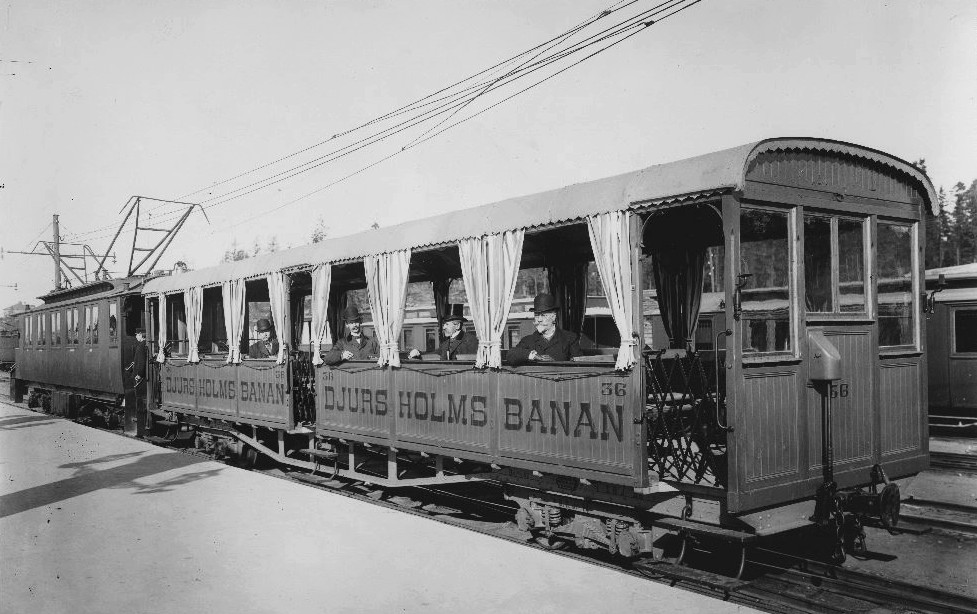
Electric train on Djursholmsbanan in Stockholm in the 1890s.

Even as steam locomotive technology continued to improve, inventors in Germany began developing alternative methods for powering trains. Werner von Siemens built the first train powered by electricity in 1879, and went on to pioneer electric trams. Another German inventor, Rudolf Diesel, constructed the first diesel engine in the 1890s, though the potential of his invention to power trains was not realized until decades later. Between 1897 and 1903, tests of experimental electric locomotives on the Royal Prussian Military Railway in Germany demonstrated they were viable, setting speed records in excess of 160 kilometers per hour (100 mph).

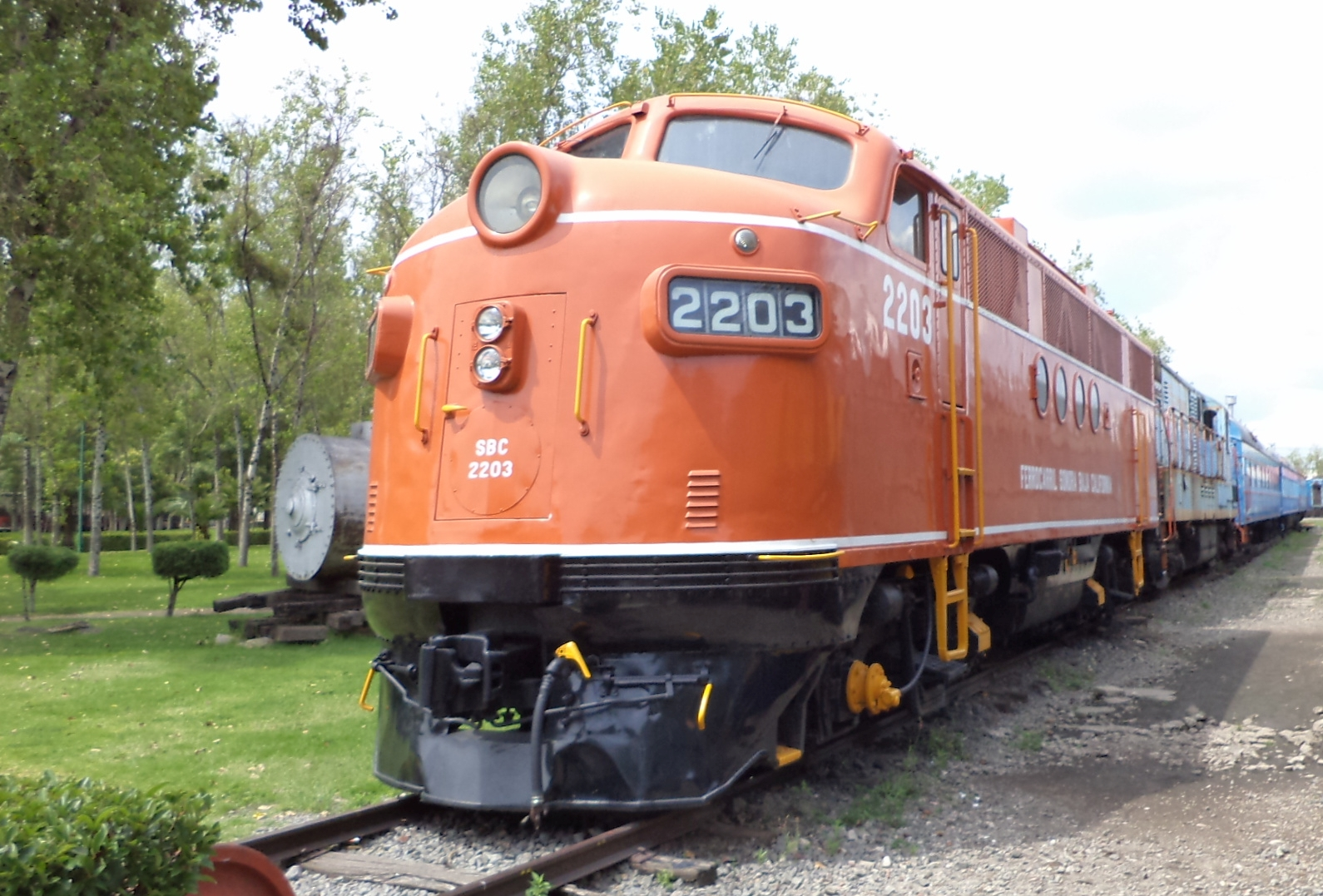
The EMD FT set the stage for diesel locomotives to take over from steam.

Early gas powered "doodlebug" self-propelled railcars entered service on railroads in the first decade of the 1900s. Experimentation with diesel and gas power continued, culminating in the German "Flying Hamburger" in 1933, and the influential American EMD FT in 1939. These successful diesel locomotives showed that diesel power was superior to steam, due to lower costs, ease of maintenance, and better reliability. Meanwhile, Italy developed an extensive network of electric trains during the first decades of the 20th century, driven by that country's lack of significant coal reserves.

=== Dieselization and increased competition ===
World War II caused widespread destruction of existing railroads across Europe, Asia, and Africa. Following the war's conclusion in 1945, nations which had suffered extensive damage to their railroad networks took the opportunity provided by Marshall Plan funds (or economic assistance from the USSR and Comecon, for nations behind the Iron Curtain) and advances in technology to convert their trains to diesel or electric power. France, Russia, Switzerland, and Japan were leaders in adopting widespread electrified railroads, while other nations focused primarily on dieselization. By 1980, the majority of the world's steam locomotives had been retired, though they continued to be used in parts of Africa and Asia, along with a few holdouts in Europe and South America. China was the last country to dieselize fully, due to its abundant coal reserves; steam locomotives were used to haul mainline trains as late as 2005 in Inner Mongolia.

Trains began to face strong competition from automobiles and freight trucks in the 1930s, and this competition intensified greatly following World War II. After the war, air transport also became a significant competitor for passenger trains. Large amounts of traffic shifted to these new forms of transportation, resulting in a widespread decline in train service, both freight and passenger. A new development in the 1960s was high-speed rail, which runs on dedicated rights of way and travels at speeds of 240 kilometers per hour (150 mph) or greater. The first high-speed rail service was the Japanese Shinkansen, which entered service in 1964. In the following decades, high-speed rail networks were developed across much of Europe and Eastern Asia, providing fast and reliable service competitive with automobiles and airplanes. The first high-speed train in the Americas was Amtrak's Acela in the United States, which entered service in 2000.

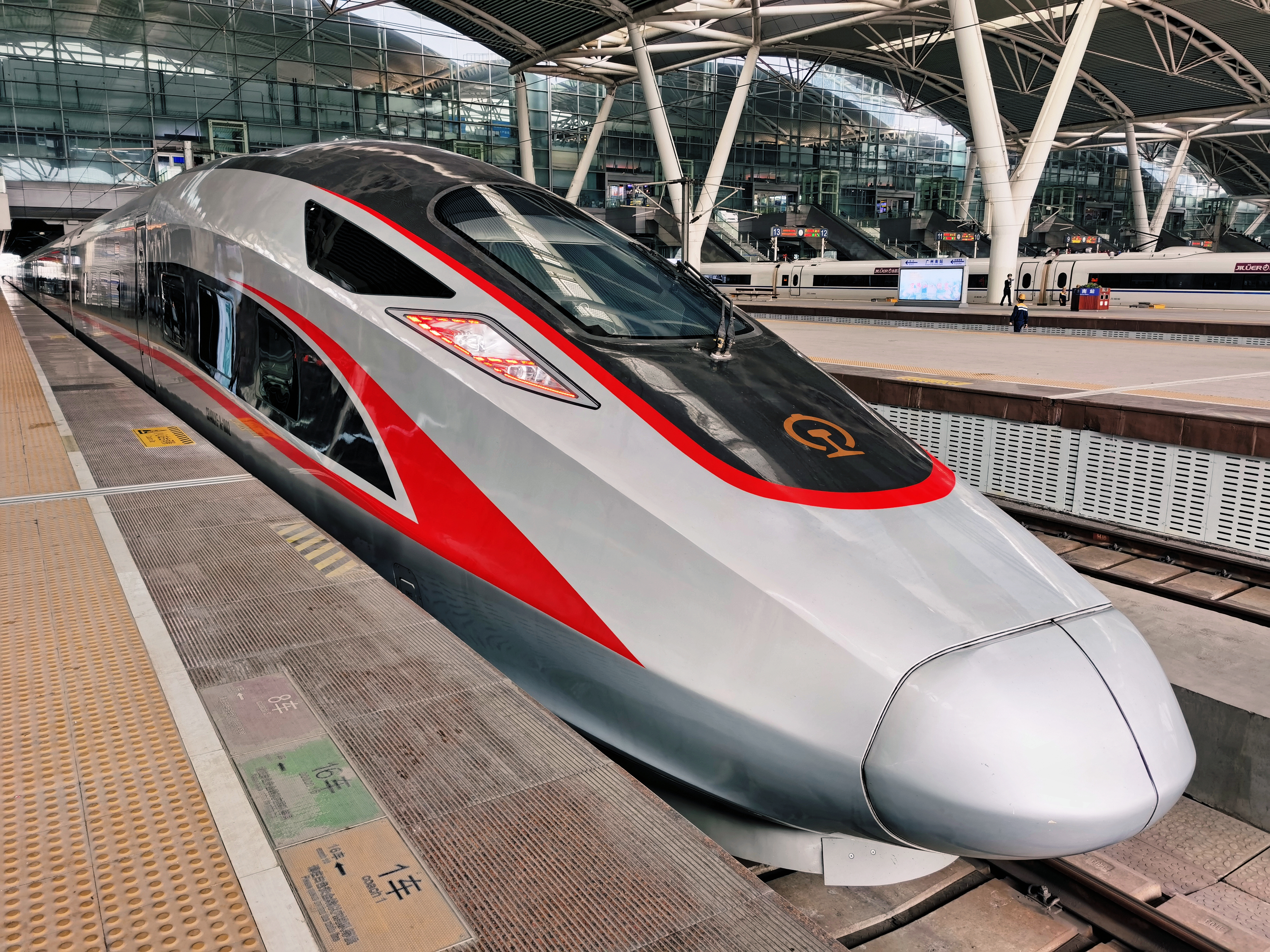
China operates an extensive high speed rail network.

=== To the present day ===
Towards the end of the 20th century, increased awareness of the benefits of trains for transport led to a revival in their use and importance. Freight trains are significantly more efficient than trucks and emit far fewer greenhouse gas emissions per ton-mile; passenger trains are also far more energy-efficient than other modes of transport. According to the International Energy Agency, "On average, rail requires 12 times less energy and emits 7–11 times less GHGs per passenger-km traveled than private vehicles and airplanes, making it the most efficient mode of motorized passenger transport. Aside from shipping, freight rail is the most energy-efficient and least carbon-intensive way to transport goods." As such, rail transport is considered an important part of achieving sustainable energy. Intermodal freight trains, carrying double-stack shipping containers, have since the 1970s generated significant business for railroads and gained market share from trucks. Increased use of commuter rail has also been promoted as a means of fighting traffic congestion on highways in urban areas.

== Components ==
=== Bogies ===
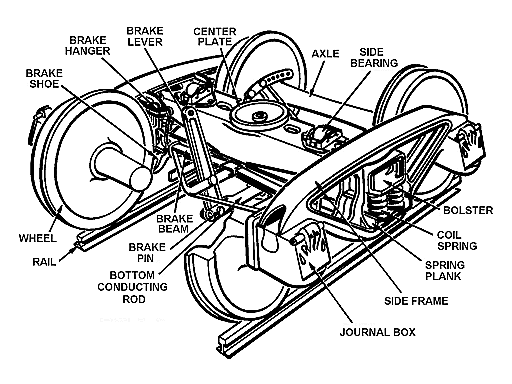
US-style railroad truck (bogie) with journal bearings

Bogies, also known in North America as trucks, support the wheels and axles of trains. Trucks range from just one axle to as many as four or more. Two-axle bogies are the most common worldwide, as they decrease the impact of track irregularities, improve curve negotiation, and distribute heavy loads more effectively than single-axle bogies.

=== Couplers ===
Train vehicles are linked to one another by various coupling systems. In much of Europe, India, and South America, trains primarily use buffers and chain couplers. In the rest of the world, knuckle couplers are the most popular, with a few local variations persisting (such as Wilson couplers in the former Soviet Union). On multiple units all over the world, Scharfenberg couplers are common.

=== Brakes ===
Because steel wheels on steel rails have a low coefficient of rolling resistance, trains rely on friction brakes applied to many or all wheels to achieve sufficient stopping force. Early trains used manually applied hand brakes: brakemen rode in brakeman's cabins or atop cars to turn brake wheels as required on downhill grades. Since 1869, George Westinghouse's automatic air brake has been nearly universally adopted; his system uses compressed air in a continuous train pipe to apply brakes simultaneously across all cars.

=== Warning devices ===
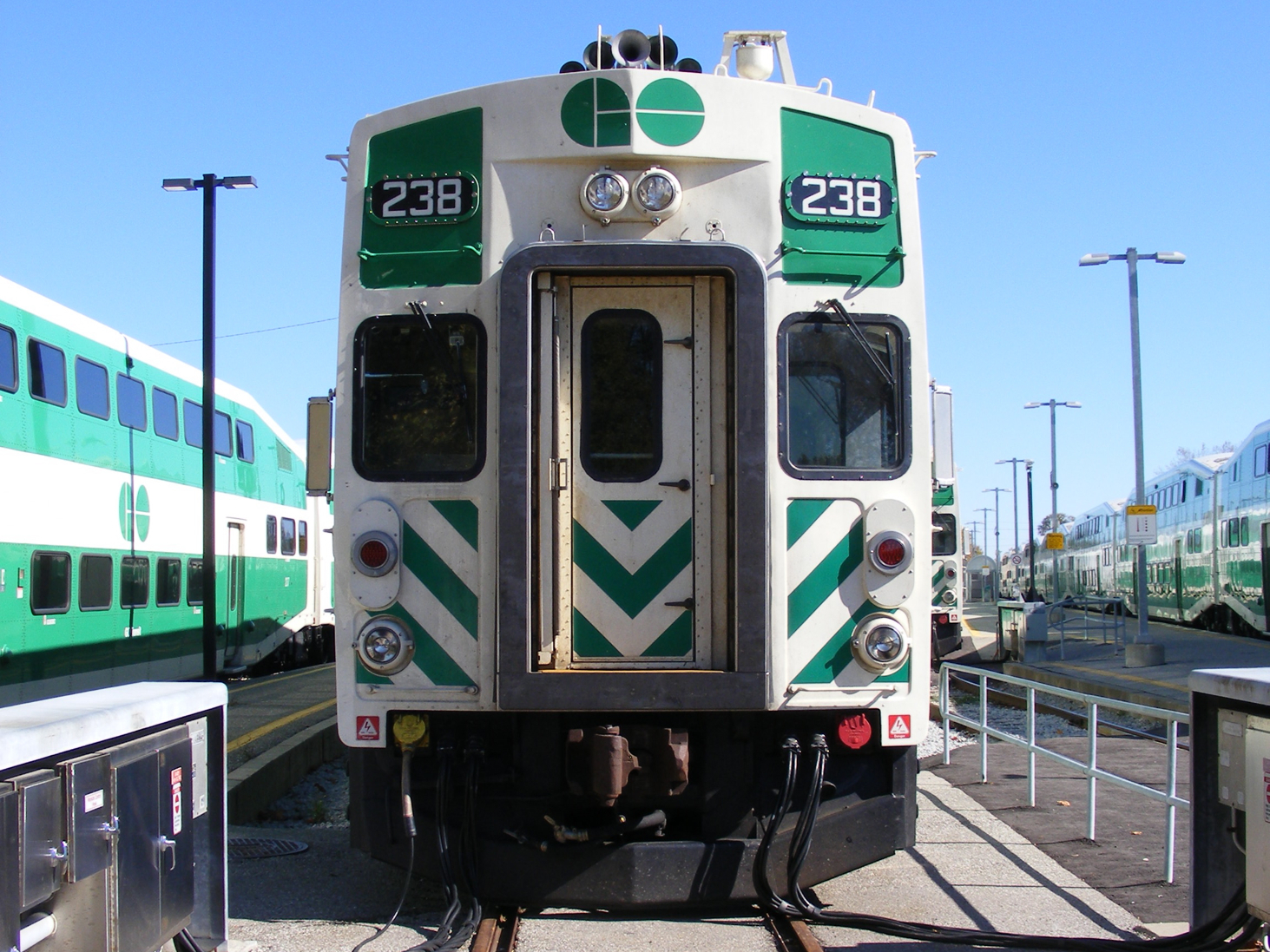
This GO Transit Bombardier BiLevel cab car includes a horn (top), a bell (top right), headlights (above the door), classification lights (red lights on side), and ditch lights (white lights on side).

For safety and communication, trains are equipped with horns and bells as mandatory audible devices under international and regional regulations—for example, EU Directive 2004/49/EC Annex I specifies "audible devices: bells, horns, klaxons, etc". as part of level-crossing warning equipment—and the U.S. Federal Railroad Administration defines and mandates locomotive audible warning devices (air horn, steam whistle or similar) under 49 CFR 229.129 ("locomotive horn"). Steam locomotives traditionally use steam whistles rather than air horns. Visual warning lights include headlights, classification lights, Mars Light, and ditch lights.

=== Cabs ===
Locomotives are, in most cases, equipped with cabs, also known as driving compartments, where a train driver controls the train's operation. They may also be installed on unpowered train cars known as cab or control cars, to allow for a train to operate with the locomotive at the rear.

== Operations ==
=== Scheduling and dispatching ===
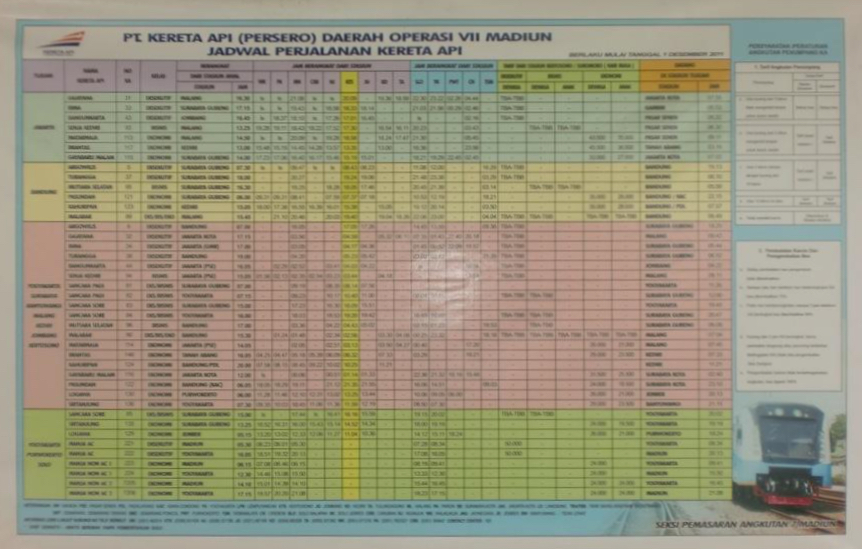
Schedule of train departure times in Indonesia stations

To prevent collisions or other accidents, trains are often scheduled and, almost always, are under the control of train dispatchers. Historically, trains operated based on timetables; most trains (including nearly all passenger trains), continue to operate based on fixed schedules, though freight trains may instead run on an as-needed basis, or when enough freight cars are available to justify running a train.

=== Maintenance ===
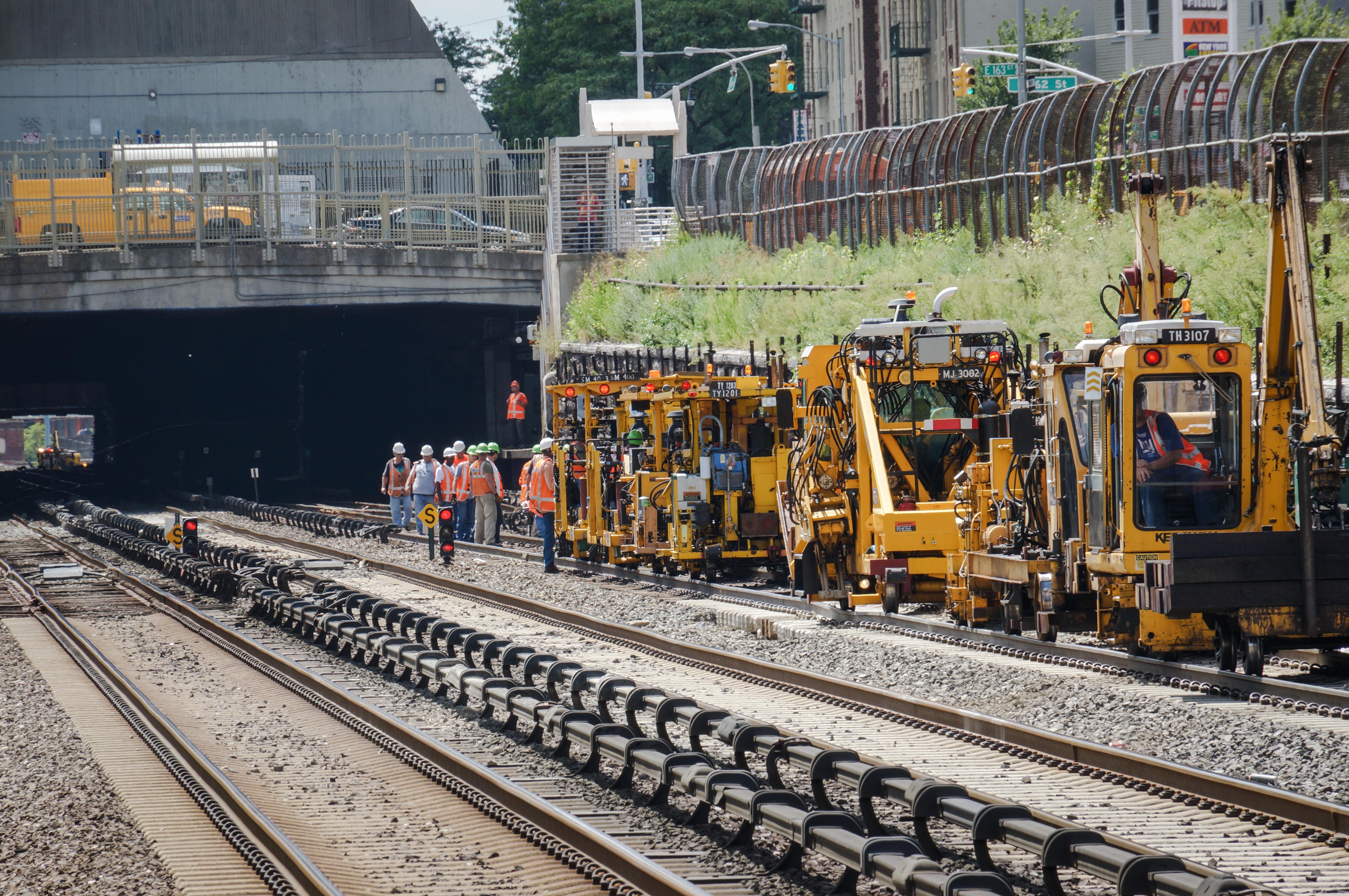
A number of maintenance vehicles at work on Metro-North Railroad

Simple repairs may be done while a train is parked on the tracks, but more extensive repairs will be done at a motive power depot. Similar facilities exist for repairing damaged or defective train cars. Maintenance of way trains are used to build and repair railroad tracks and other equipment.

=== Crew ===
Train drivers, also known as engineers, are responsible for operating trains. Conductors are in charge of trains and their cargo, and help passengers on passenger trains. Brakeman, also known as trainmen, were historically responsible for manually applying brakes, though the term is used today to refer to crew members who perform tasks such as operating switches, coupling and uncoupling train cars, and setting handbrakes on equipment. Steam locomotives require a fireman who is responsible for fueling and regulating the locomotive's fire and boiler. On passenger trains, other crew members assist passengers, such as chefs to prepare food, and service attendants to provide food and drinks to passengers. Other passenger train-specific duties include passenger car attendants, who assist passengers with boarding and alighting from trains, answer questions, and keep train cars clean, and sleeping car attendants, who perform similar duties in sleeping cars. Some trains can operate with automatic train operation without a driver directly present.

=== Gauge ===
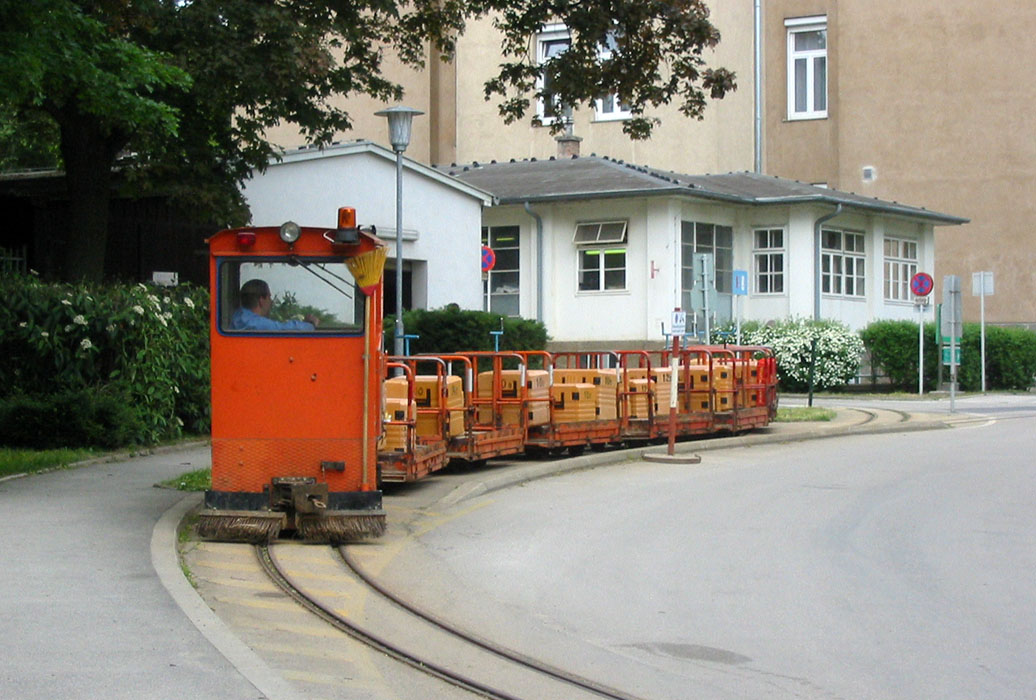
A narrow gauge train in Austria

Around the world, various track gauges are in use for trains. In most cases, trains can only operate on tracks of the same gauge; where trains of different gauges meet, it is known as a break of gauge. Standard gauge, defined as 1,435 mm (4 ft 8.5 in) between the rails, is the most common gauge worldwide, though both broad-gauge and narrow-gauge trains are also in use. Trains also need to fit within the loading gauge profile, ensuring they are not too tall or wide to avoid fouling bridges and lineside infrastructure. This is a potential limiting factor on what loads can be carried, such as intermodal containers.

== Safety ==
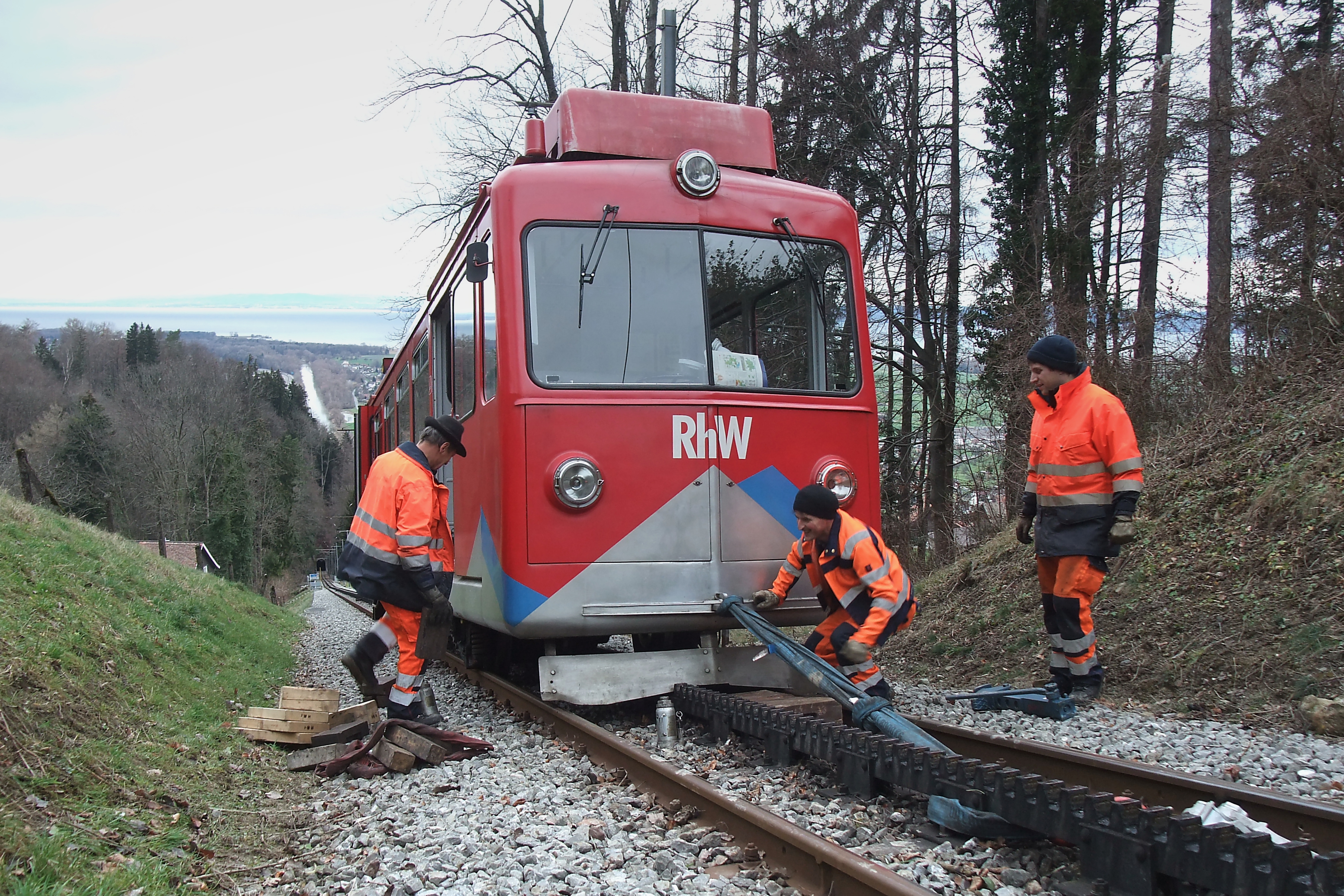
Most derailments, such as this one in Switzerland, are minor and do not cause injuries or damage.

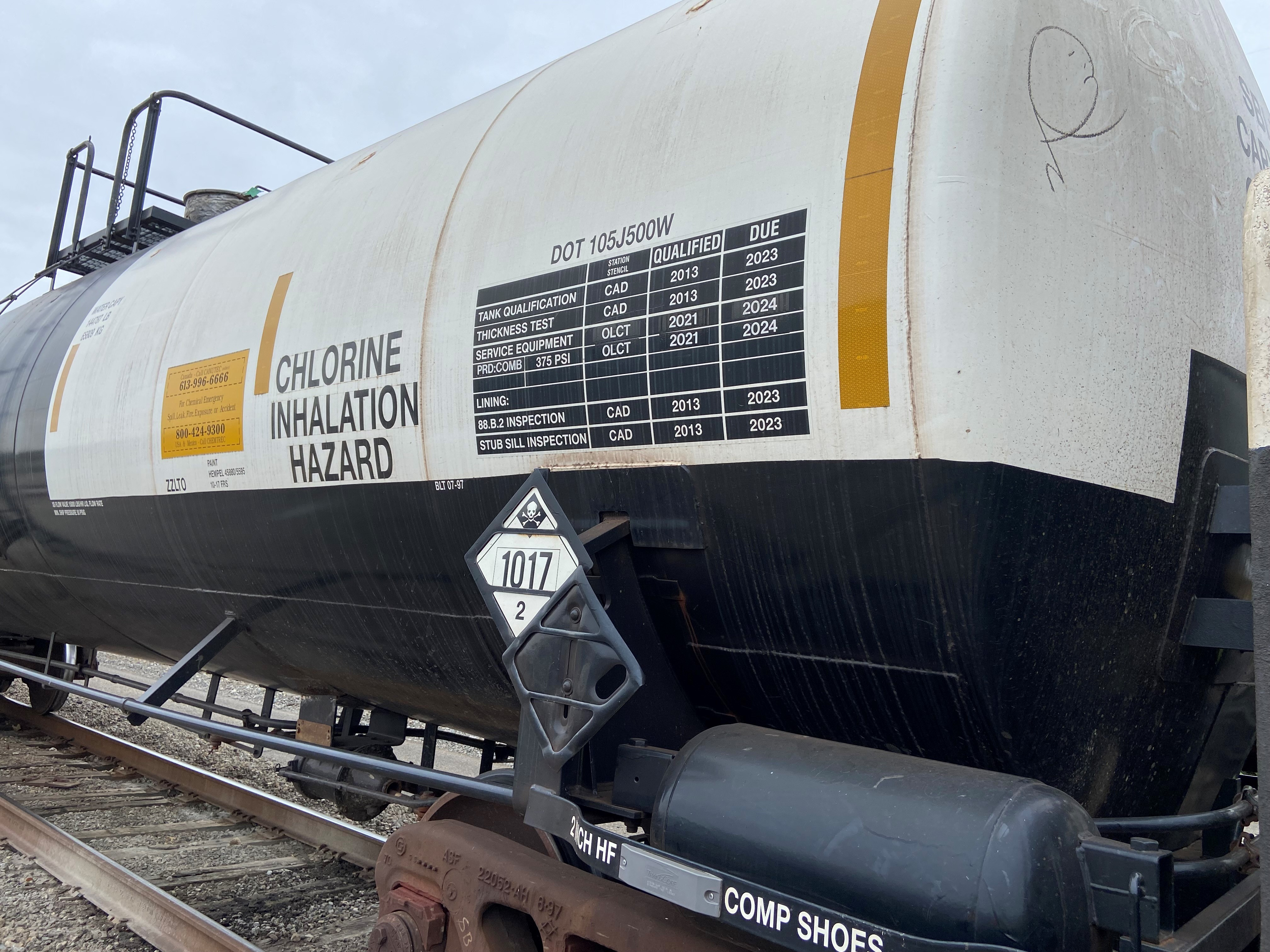
Trains carrying hazardous materials display information identifying their cargo and hazards. This tank car carrying chlorine displays, among other markings, a U.S. DOT placard showing a UN number that identifies the hazardous substance.

Train accidents sometimes occur, including derailments (when a train leaves the tracks) and train wrecks (collisions between trains). Accidents were more common in the early days of trains, when railway signal systems, centralized traffic control, and failsafe systems to prevent collisions were primitive or nonexistent. To prevent accidents, systems such as automatic train stop are used; these are failsafe systems that apply the brakes on a train if it passes a red signal and enters an occupied block, or if any of the train's equipment malfunctions. More advanced safety systems, such as positive train control, can also automatically regulate train speed, preventing derailments from entering curves or switches too fast.

Modern trains have a very good safety record overall, comparable with air travel. In the United States between 2000 and 2009, train travel averaged 0.43 deaths per billion passenger miles traveled. While this was higher than that of air travel at 0.07 deaths per billion passenger miles, it was also far below the 7.28 deaths per billion passenger miles of car travel. In the 21st century, several derailments of oil trains caused fatalities, most notably the Canadian Lac-Mégantic rail disaster in 2013 which killed 47 people and leveled much of the town of Lac-Mégantic.

The vast majority of train-related fatalities, over 90 percent, are due to trespassing on railroad tracks or collisions with road vehicles at level crossings. Organizations such as Operation Lifesaver have been formed to improve safety awareness at railroad crossings, and governments have also launched ad campaigns. Trains cannot stop quickly at speed; even an emergency brake application may still require more than a mile to stop. As such, emphasis is on educating motorists to yield to trains at crossings and avoid trespassing.

== Motive power ==
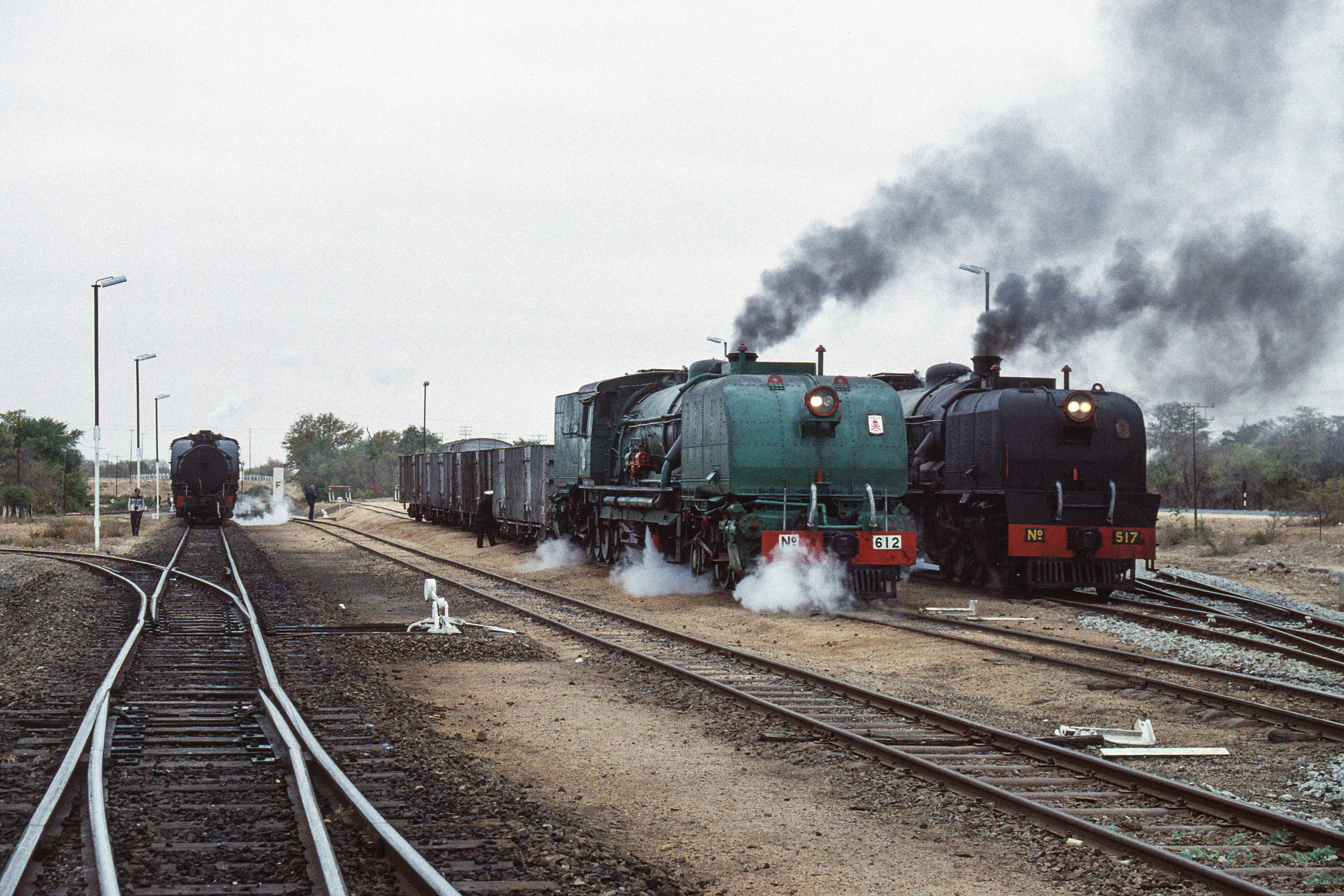
Garratt locomotives in Zimbabwe

=== Before steam ===
The first trains were rope-hauled, gravity powered, or pulled by horses.

=== Steam ===
Steam locomotives work by burning coal, wood, or oil in a boiler to heat water into steam, which powers the locomotive's pistons, which are, in turn, connected to the wheels. In the mid-20th century, most steam locomotives were replaced by diesel or electric locomotives, which were cheaper, cleaner, and more reliable. Steam locomotives are still used in heritage railways operated in many countries for the leisure and enthusiast market.

=== Diesel ===
Diesel locomotives are powered by a diesel engine, which generates electricity to drive traction motors. This is known as a diesel–electric transmission, and is used on most larger diesels. Diesel power replaced steam for a variety of reasons: diesel locomotives were less complex, far more reliable, cheaper, cleaner, easier to maintain, and more fuel efficient.

=== Electric ===
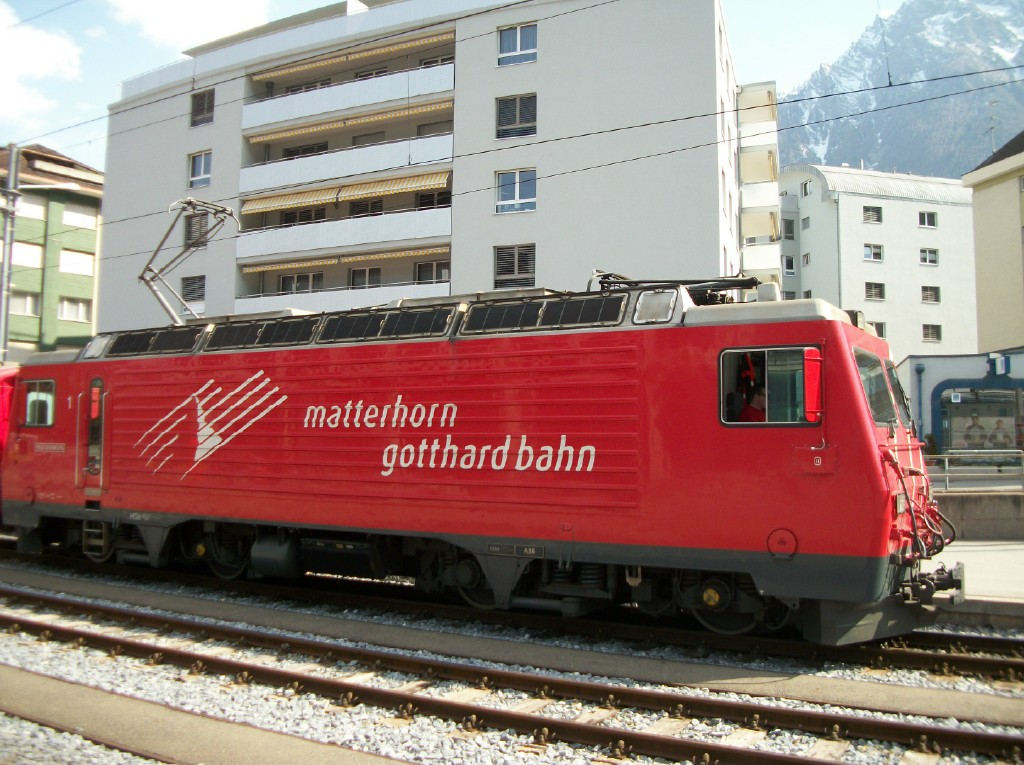
Swiss Electric locomotive at Brig, Switzerland

Electric trains receive their current via overhead lines or through a third rail electric system, which is then used to power traction motors that drive the wheels. Electric traction offers a lower cost per mile of train operation but at a higher initial cost, which can only be justified on high traffic lines. Even though the cost per mile of construction is much higher, electric traction is cheaper to operate thanks to lower maintenance and purchase costs for locomotives and equipment. Compared to diesel locomotives, electric locomotives produce no direct emissions and accelerate much faster, making them better suited to passenger service, especially underground.

Some trains also operate using energy from a battery, which removes the need for overhead lines, but results in a limited range.

=== Other types ===
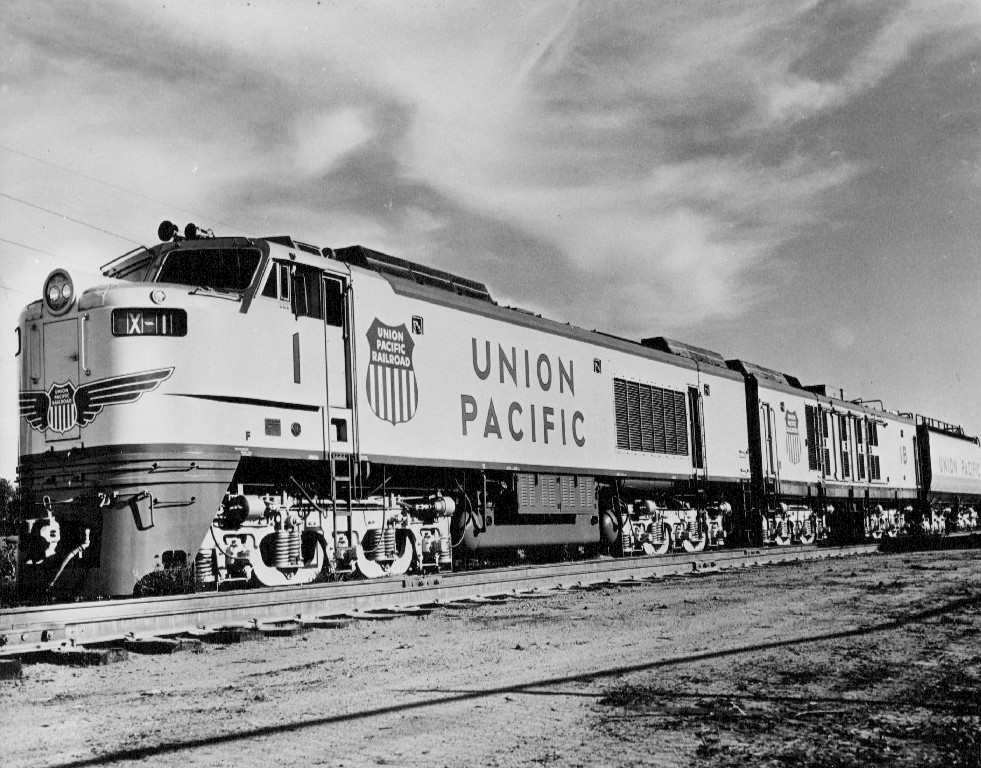
A gas turbine locomotive operated by the Union Pacific Railroad

Various other types of train propulsion have been tried, some more successful than others.

In the mid-1900s, gas turbine locomotives were developed and successfully used, though most were retired due to high fuel costs and poor reliability.

In the 21st century, alternative fuels for locomotives are under development due to increasing costs for diesel and a desire to reduce greenhouse gas emissions from trains. Examples include hydrail (trains powered by hydrogen fuel cells) and the use of compressed or liquefied natural gas.

== Unpowered rail vehicles ==
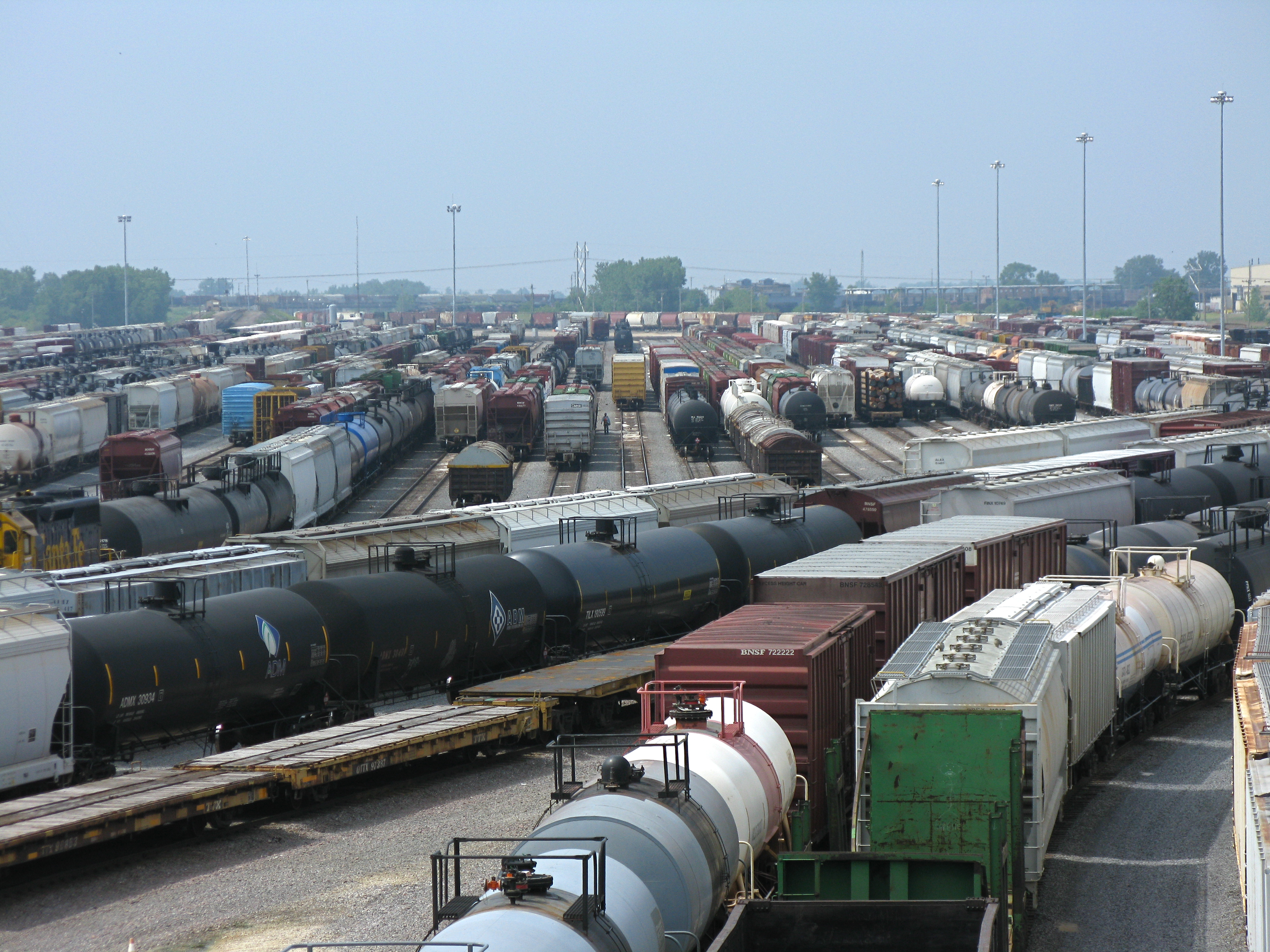
Various types of railroad cars in a classification yard in the United States

Railroad cars, also known in CwthE as wagons, are unpowered rail vehicles typically pulled by locomotives. Many different types exist, specialized to handle various types of cargo. Some common types include boxcars (CwthE: covered goods wagons) that carry a wide variety of cargo, flatcars (CwthE: flat wagons) which have flat tops to hold cargo, hopper cars which carry bulk commodities, and tank cars which carry liquids and gases. Examples of more specialized types of train cars include bottle cars which hold molten steel, Schnabel cars which handle very heavy loads, and refrigerator cars which carry perishable goods.

Early train cars were small and light, much like early locomotives, but over time they have become larger as locomotives have become more powerful.

== Passenger trains ==
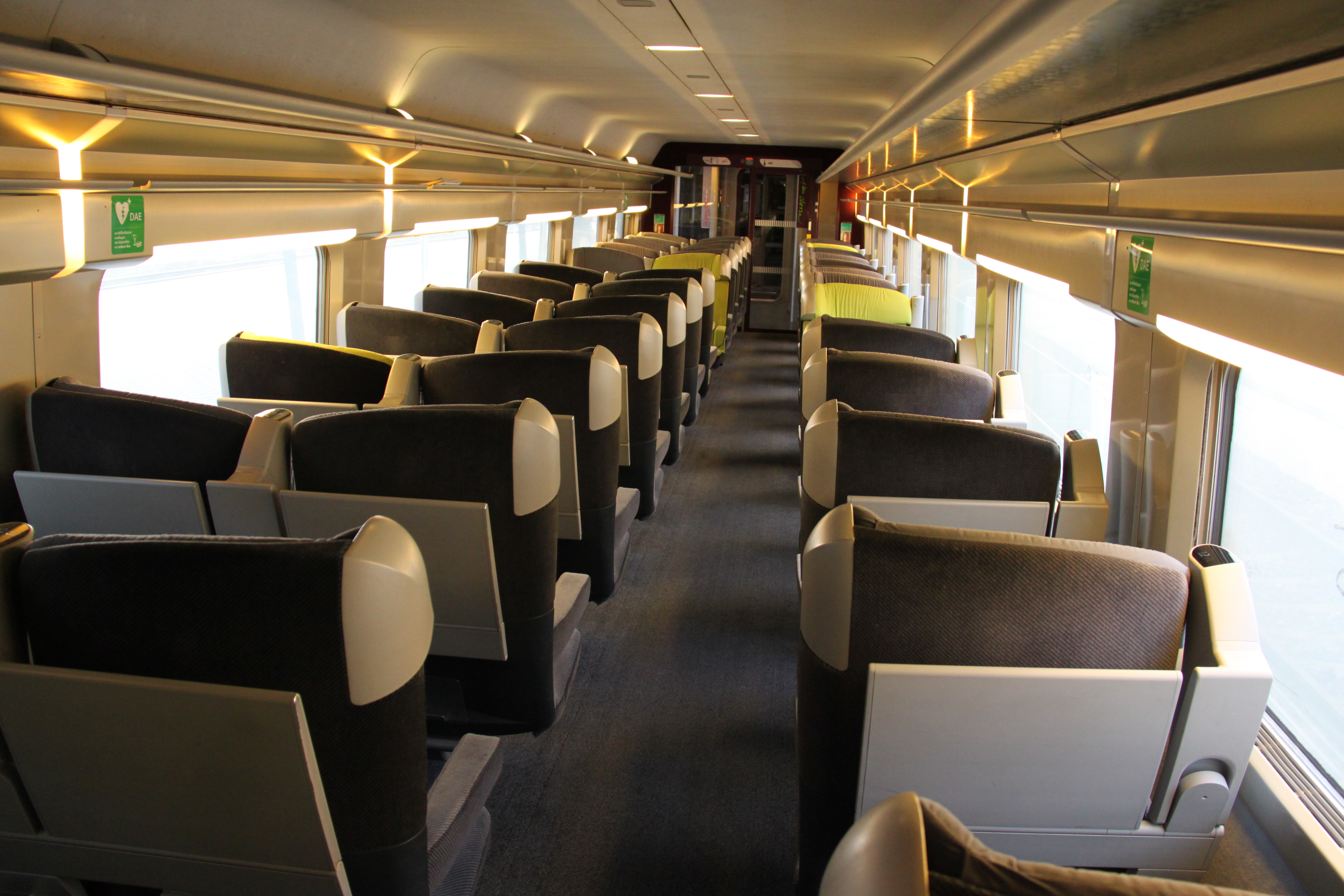
TGV Lacroix first class interior

A passenger train transports people along a railroad line. These trains may consist of unpowered passenger railroad cars (also known as coaches or carriages) hauled by one or more locomotives, or may be self-propelled; self-propelled passenger trains are known as multiple units or railcars. Passenger trains travel between stations or depots, where passengers may board and disembark. In most cases, passenger trains operate on a fixed schedule and have priority over freight trains. In Europe, passenger trains are assigned to different train categories. Passenger trains can be divided into short and long-distance services.

=== Long-distance trains ===
Long-distance passenger trains travel over hundreds or even thousands of miles between cities. Intercity trains travel between major cities and often take several hours to complete the journey. Transcontinental services cross entire continents, with the longest passenger train service in the world being Russia's Trans-Siberian Railway between Moscow and Vladivostok, a distance of 9,289 kilometers (5,772 mi). In general, long distance trains may take days to complete their journeys, and stop at dozens of stations along their routes. For many rural communities, they are the only form of public transportation available.

=== Short-distance trains ===
Short-distance or regional passenger trains have travel times measured in hours or even minutes, as opposed to days. They run more frequently than long-distance trains, and are often used by commuters. Short-distance passenger trains specifically designed for commuters are known as commuter rail.

=== High-speed trains ===
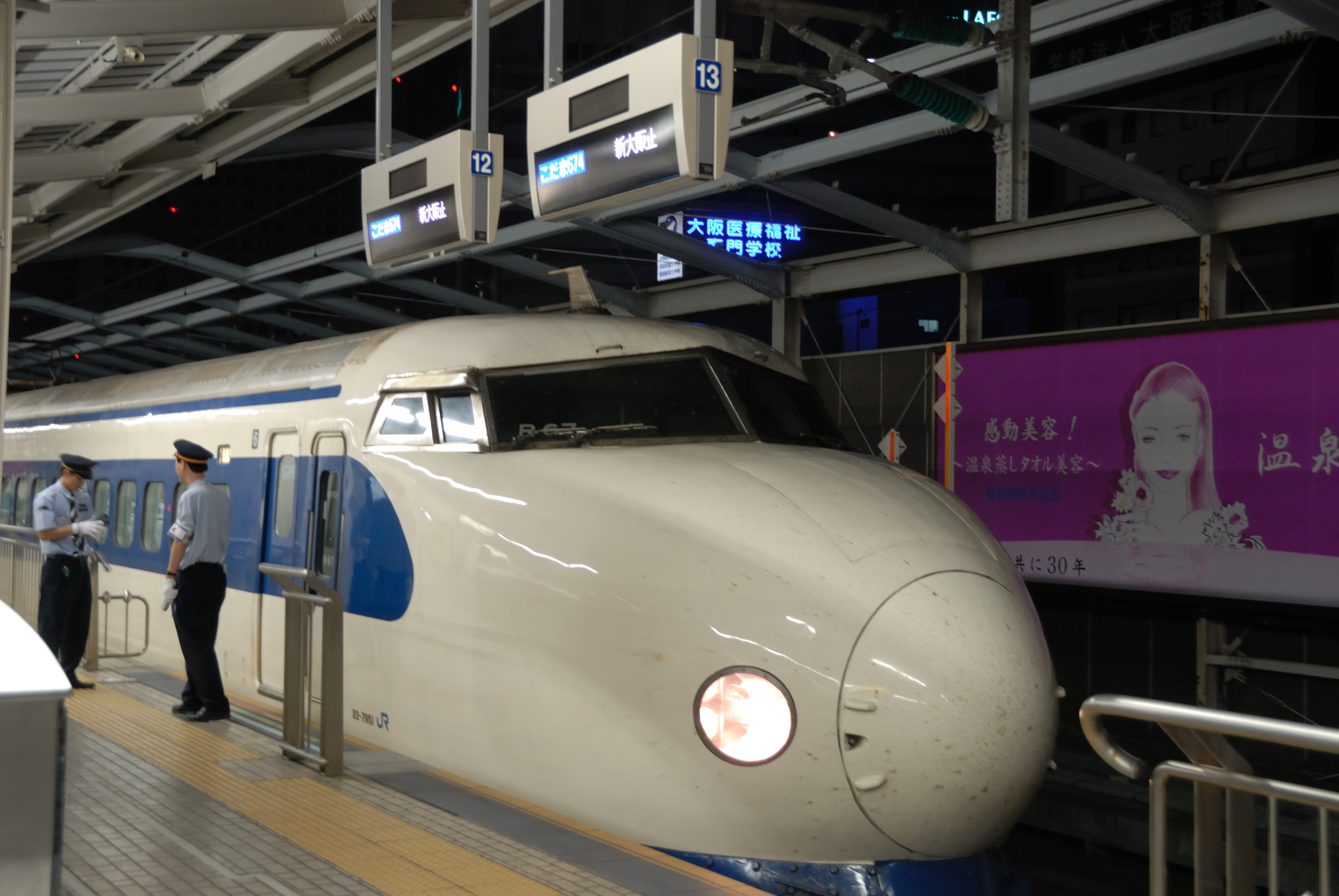
The Japanese 0 Series Shinkansen pioneered high speed rail service

The first high-speed train was the Japanese Shinkansen, which entered service in 1964. Since the 1990s, services such as the French TGV and German Intercity Express have become competitive with airlines in travel time over short to medium distances.

The lower threshold for the high-speed category is generally 200 kilometres per hour (120 miles per hour). These trains operate at cruising speeds up to 355 kilometres per hour (221 miles per hour). Such a speed is incompatible with that of conventional trains, so high speed trains usually run on their own separate tracks – although they may run more slowly when they are deployed on conventional-speed feeder lines on some systems.

"Higher speed trains" is the category between conventional and high-speed trains, which travel at speeds between the two. Examples include the Northeast Regional (excluding the Acela) in the United States, the Gatimaan Express in India, and the KTM ETS in Malaysia.

=== Luxury trains ===
Luxury trains provide premium rail services on their journey, either within a given country or across country borders. Some use refurbished classic rail cars.

== Urban rail transit ==
A number of train types are used to provide transit in urban areas. These are distinct from traditional passenger trains in that they operate more frequently, typically do not share tracks with freight trains, and cover relatively short distances. Many different kinds of systems are in use globally.

=== Rapid transit ===
Rapid transit uses trains that operate in tunnels below ground, on elevated structures like viaducts or bridges above the ground, often on top of city streets or on surface level with an independent alignment from pedestrians or other types of traffic. In many systems, two or even all three of these types may exist on different portions of a network. Alternative terms for these systems include subway, underground, metro, and heavy rail, the latter indicating higher investment costs and passenger loads than light rail.

=== Trams ===
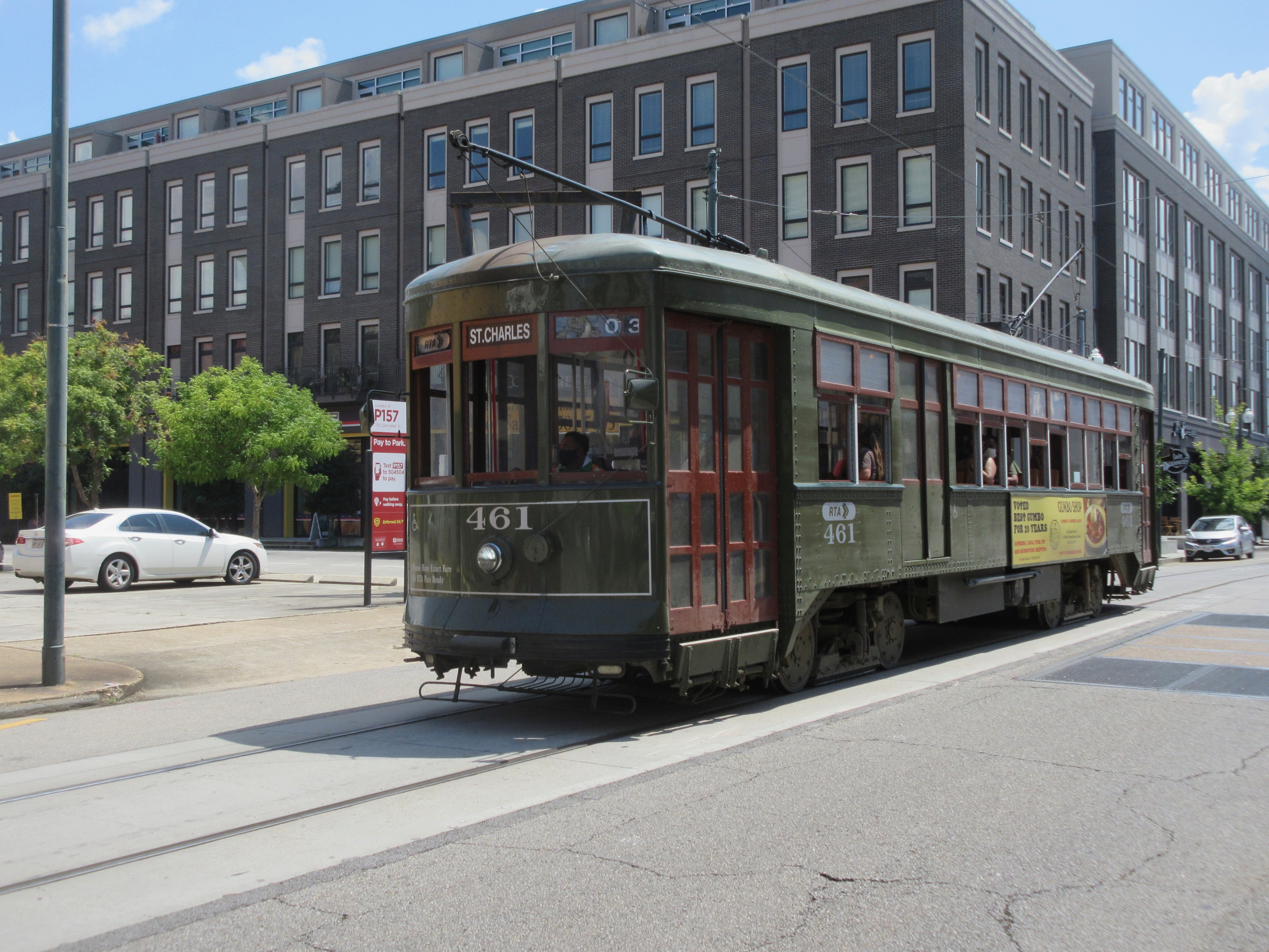
The New Orleans Streetcar System is the oldest in the world.

Trams, also known in North America as streetcars, typically operate on or parallel to city streets, with frequent stops and high service frequency. Trams emerged in the USA in the 1830s and became popular from the 1860s in Europe and later in other regions as well. Originally, tramcars were pulled by horses; alternative propulsion, like steam power and cables, gained success until the arrival of electric trams. Since the 1990s low-floor trams have become common.

=== Light rail ===
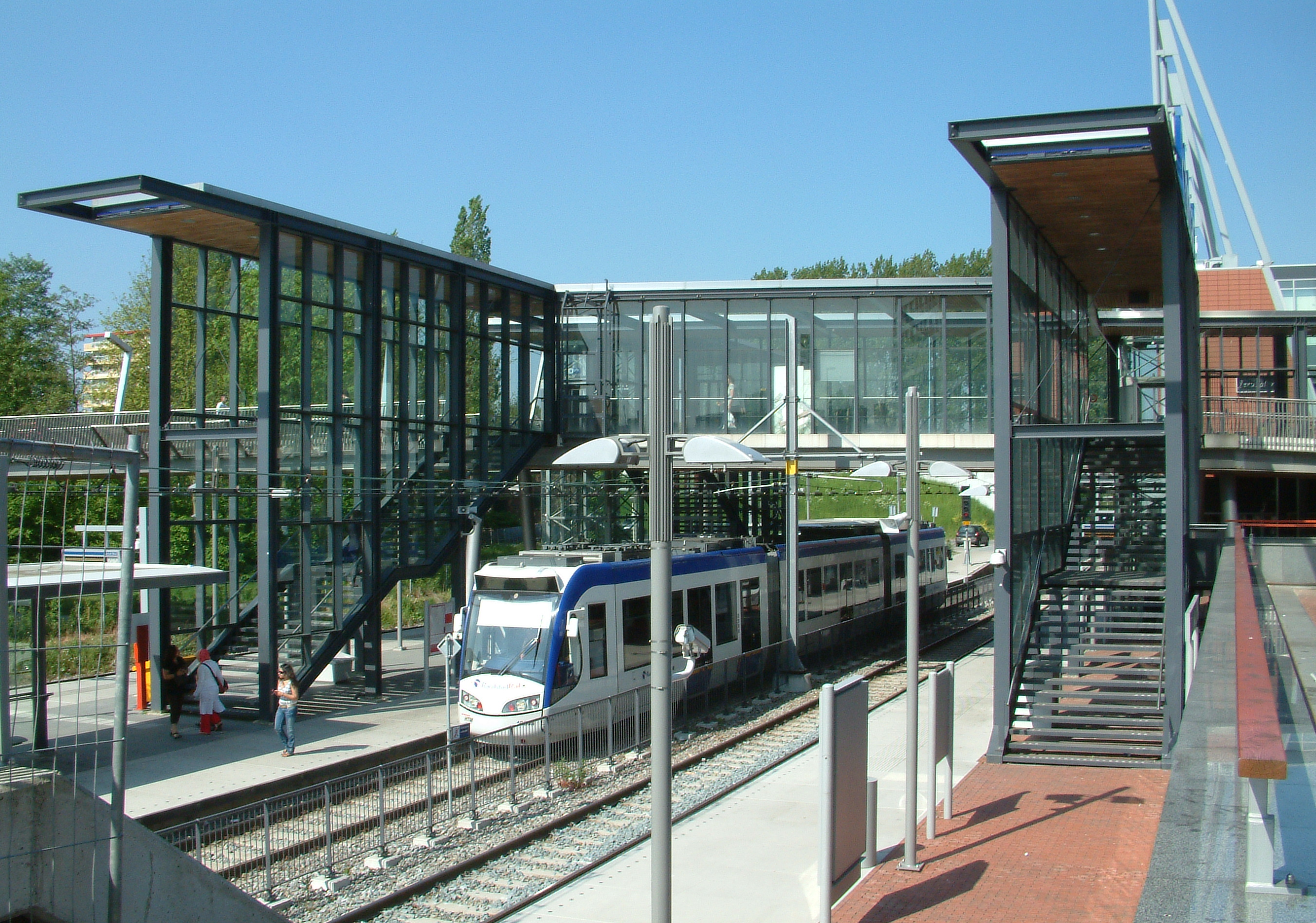
RegioCitadis light rail train in Zoetermeer (the Netherlands).

Light rail is an umbrella term for a variety of systems that use tram technology, but with more separate right-of-ways and often a longer distance between stops. The term was coined in the USA in 1972 to refer to modernized tram systems. Since 2021, the number of light rail systems (including trams) has grown to over 400 worldwide. Despite the name, diesel light rail transit (DLRT) uses mainline railway technology.

== Specialized trains ==
There are a number of specialized trains that differ from the traditional definition of a train as a set of vehicles that travel on two rails.

=== Monorail ===
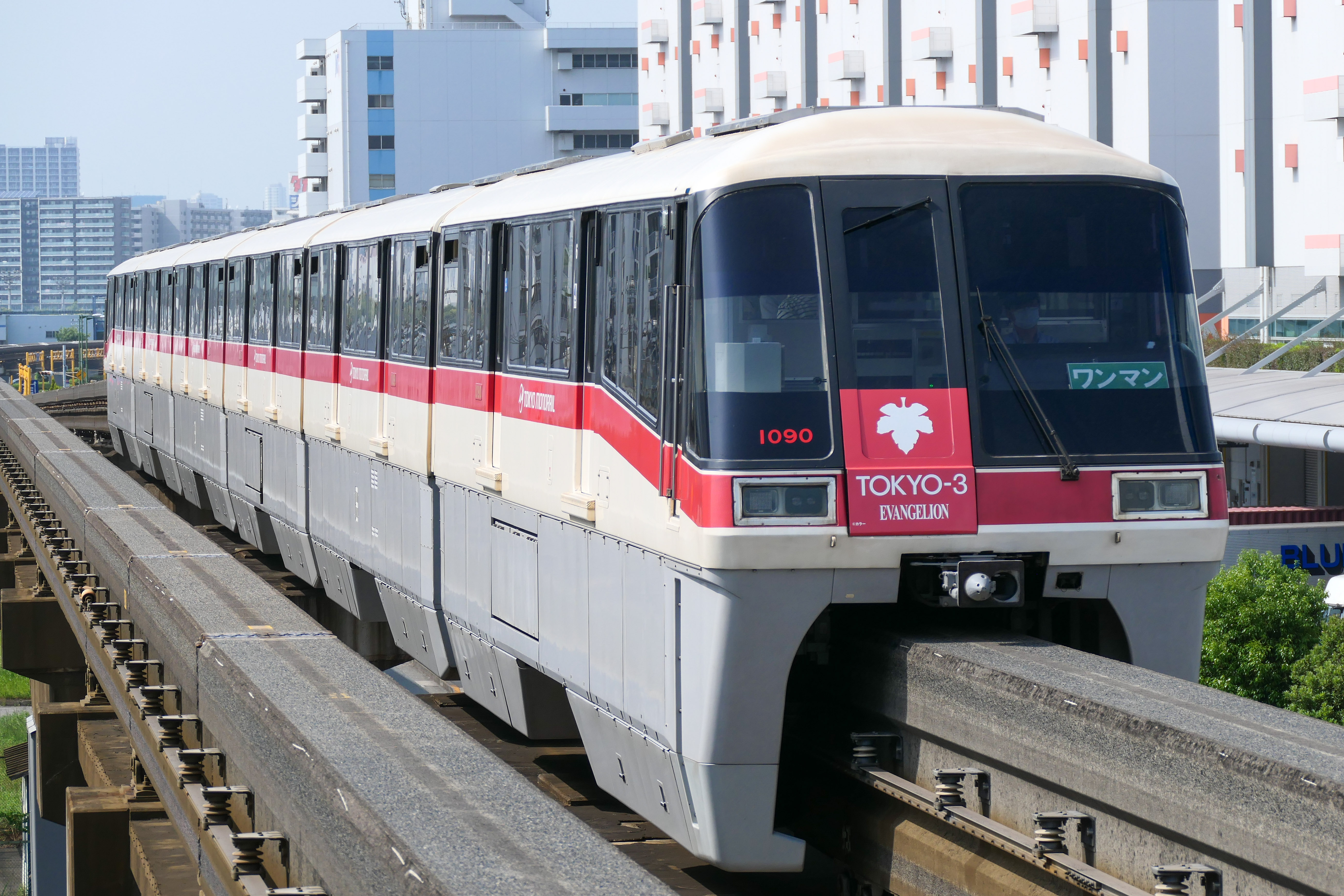
A Tokyo Monorail train

Monorails consist of a train running either mounted on a single rail or suspended under a girder, typically elevated. Most lines meet medium-demand traffic in urban transit (mostly in Japan), others are used in theme parks and zoos. Monorails represent a small proportion of the train systems in use worldwide. First examples appeared in the 19th century, and an early line that's still in use since 1901, is the suspended Schwebebahn in Wuppertal.

=== Maglev ===
Maglev technology uses magnets to levitate the train above the track, reducing friction and allowing higher speeds. The first commercial maglev train was an airport shuttle introduced in 1984 at Birmingham Airport in England.

The Shanghai maglev train, opened in 2002, is the fastest commercial train service, operating at speeds of up to 431 km/h (268 mph). Japan's L0 Series maglev holds the record for the world's fastest train ever, with a top speed of 603.0 kilometers per hour (374.7 mph). Maglev has not yet been used for inter-city mass transit routes, with only a few examples in use worldwide as of 2019.

=== Mine trains ===
Mine trains are operated in large mines and carry both workers and goods. They are usually powered by electricity to prevent emissions, which would pose a health risk to workers underground.

=== Militarized trains ===
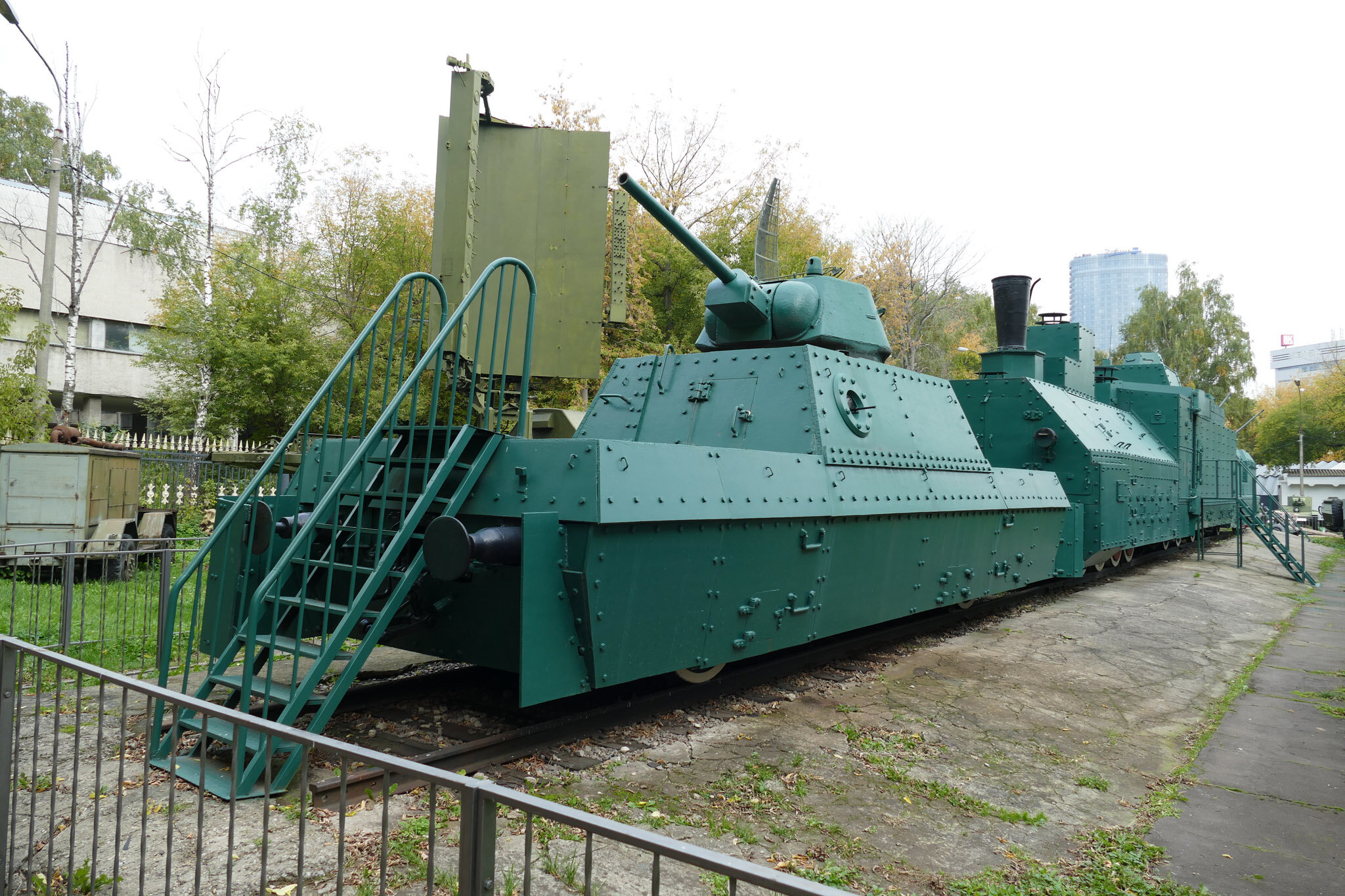
A preserved armored train

While they have long been important in transporting troops and military equipment, trains have occasionally been used for direct combat. Armored trains have been used in many conflicts, as have railroad-based artillery systems. Nuclear weapon states have also use railcar-launched ICBM systems.

=== Rack railway ===
For climbing steep slopes, specialized rack railroads are used. To avoid slipping, a rack and pinion system is used, with a toothed rail placed between the two regular rails that meshes with a drive gear under the locomotive.

=== Funicular ===
Funiculars are also used to climb steep slopes, but instead of a rack, they use a rope attached to two cars and a pulley. The two funicular cars travel up and down the slope on parallel sets of rails when the pulley is rotated. This design makes funiculars an efficient means of moving people and cargo up and down slopes. The earliest funicular railroad, the Reisszug, opened around 1500.

=== Rubber-tired train ===
Rubber-tired trains, or rubber-tired metro systems, use rubber tires for traction and guidance, offering advantages such as improved acceleration and reduced noise. However, they come with disadvantages, including higher installation and maintenance costs, faster tire wear, and complex inflation mechanisms that require regular upkeep. Nonetheless, these systems are utilized in many urban rapid transit networks worldwide, enhancing passenger comfort and urban transportation efficiency.

== Freight trains ==
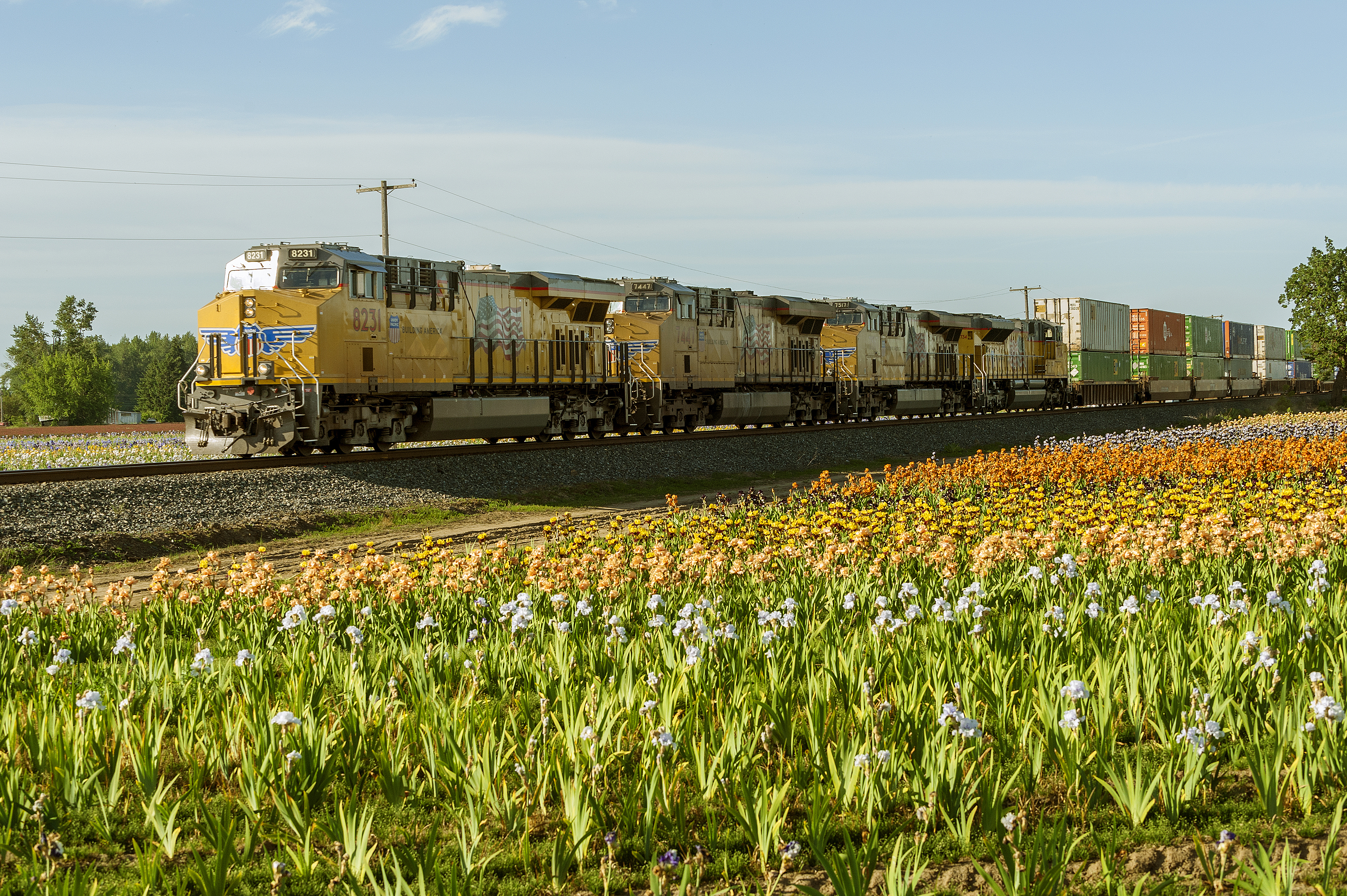
A Union Pacific freight train; high clearances enable double-stacked containers to be carried in well cars.

Freight trains are dedicated to the transport of cargo (also known as goods), rather than people, and are made up of freight cars or wagons. Longer freight trains typically operate between classification yards, while local trains provide freight service between yards and individual loading and unloading points along railroad lines. Major origin or destination points for freight may instead be served by unit trains, which exclusively carry one type of cargo and move directly from the origin to the destination and back without any intermediate stops.

Under the right circumstances, transporting freight by train is less expensive than other modes of transport and more energy-efficient than transporting freight by road. In the United States, railroads, on average, moved a ton of freight 702 kilometers (436 mi) per gallon of fuel as of 2008, an efficiency four times greater than that of trucks. The Environmental and Energy Study Institute estimates that train transportation of freight is between 1.9 and 5.5 times more efficient than by truck, and also generates significantly less pollution. Rail freight is most economic when goods are being carried in bulk and over large distances, but it is less suited to short distances and small loads. With the advent of containerization, freight rail has become part of an intermodal freight network linked with trucking and container ships.

The main disadvantage of rail freight is its lack of flexibility, and for this reason, rail has lost much of the freight business to road competition. Many governments are trying to encourage more freight to be carried by trains because of the community benefits it would bring.

== Cultural impact ==
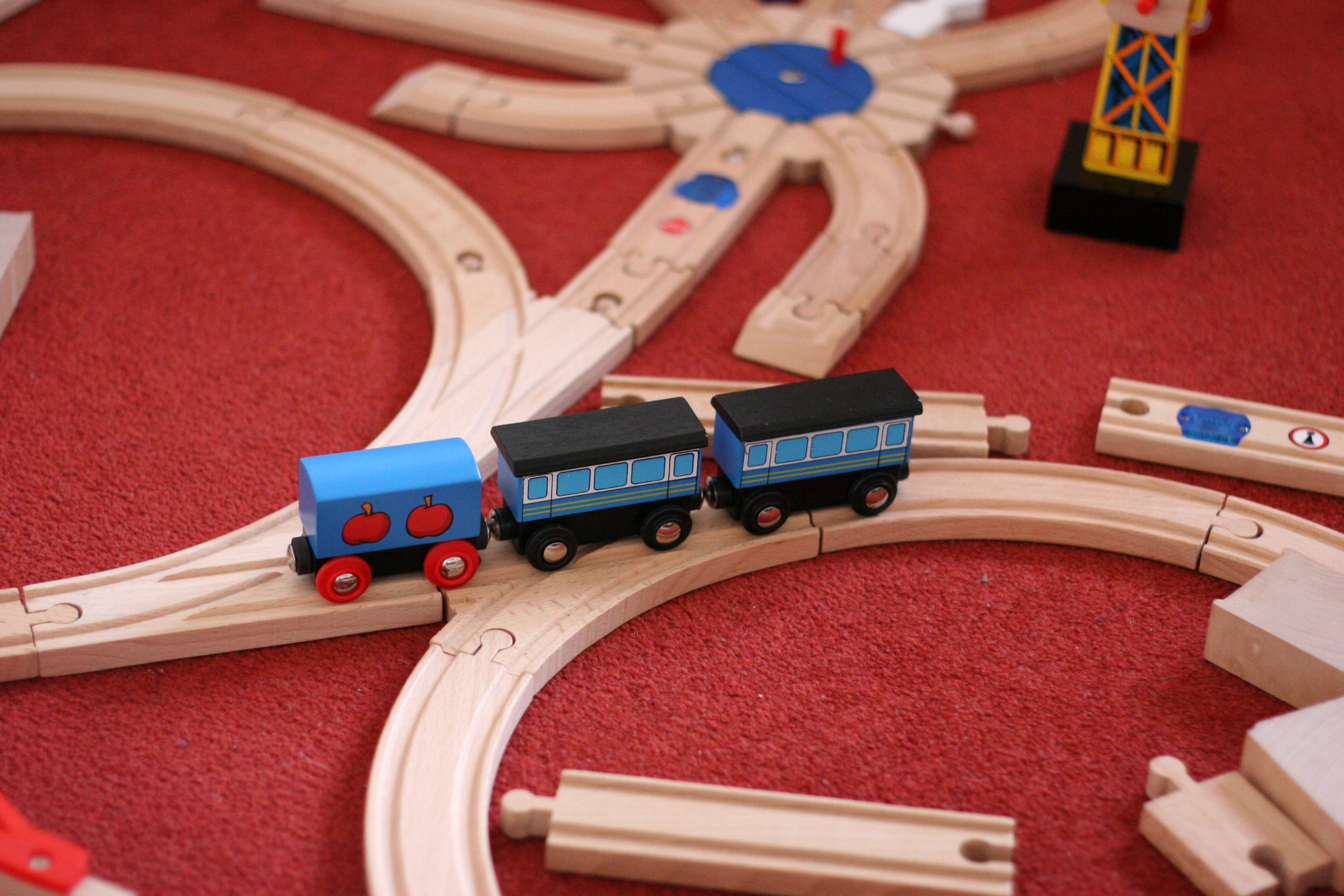
A wooden toy train set from Swedish manufacturer Brio

From the dawn of railroading, trains have had a significant cultural impact worldwide. Fast train travel made journeys that previously took days possible in a matter of hours. Transport of both freight and passengers became far cheaper, enabling networked economies across large areas. Towns and cities along railroad lines grew in importance, while those bypassed declined or even became ghost towns. Major cities such as Chicago became prominent because they were places where multiple train lines met. In the United States, the completion of the first transcontinental railroad played a major role in the settling of the western part of the nation by non-indigenous migrants and its incorporation into the rest of the country. The Russian Trans-Siberian Railway had a similar impact by connecting the vast country from east to west, and making travel across frozen Siberia possible.

Trains have long had a major influence on music, art, and literature. Many films heavily involve or are set on trains. Toy train sets are commonly used by children, traditionally boys. Railfans are found around the world, along with hobbyists who create model train layouts. Train enthusiasts generally have a positive relationship with the railroad industry, though sometimes cause issues by trespassing.

== See also ==
- List of railway companies
- Lists of named passenger trains
- Lists of rail accidents
- Overview of train systems by country
- Train ferries

== Bibliography ==
- Glancey, Jonathan (2005). The Train. Carlton Publishing Group. ISBN 978-1-84442-345-3.
- Herring, Peter (2000). Ultimate Train. Dorling Kindersley. ISBN 0-7894-4610-3. OCLC 42810706. OL 8155464M.
