= Doodlebug (railcar) =

Self-propelled railcar

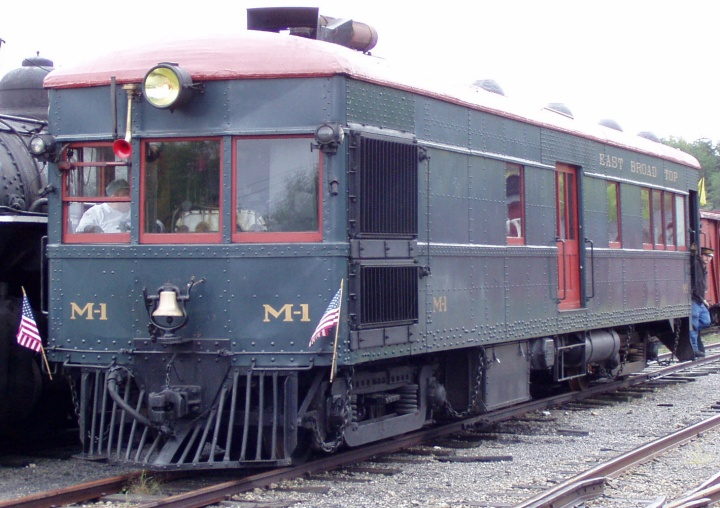
- East Broad Top No. M1, a narrow gauge gas-electric doodlebug that was constructed by EBT from a Brill manufactured kit
- Manufacturers: Various, including EMC/Pullman, Brill/Mack, Edwards Rail Car Company, McKeen Motor Car Company, Rio Grande Southern Railroad

Specifications
- Car body construction: Coach/baggage combine
- Prime movers: Various (gasoline, diesel)
- Transmission: Various (mechanical, electric, hydraulic)
- AAR wheel arrangement: Usually B-2
- Track gauge: 4 ft 8 1/2 in (1,435 mm) and 3 ft (914 mm)

Doodlebug or hoodlebug is a nickname in the United States for a type of self-propelled railcar most commonly configured to carry both passengers and freight, often dedicated baggage, mail or express, as in a combine. The term has been used interchangeably with jitney. The name is said to have derived from the insect-like appearance of the units, as well as the slow speeds at which they would doddle or "doodle" down the tracks. Early models were usually powered by a gasoline engine, with either a mechanical drive train or a generator providing electricity to traction motors ("gas-electrics"). In later years, it was common for doodlebugs to be repowered with a diesel engine.

Doodlebugs sometimes pulled an unpowered trailer car, but were more often used singly. They were popular with some railroads during the first part of the 20th century to provide passenger and mail service on lightly used branch lines at less expense than with a train consisting of a locomotive and coaches with larger crew. Several railroads, mostly small regional and local networks, provided their main passenger services through doodlebugs in a cost-cutting effort.

== History ==
The development of gasoline engines led railroads to seek them as higher efficiency alternatives to steam power for low-volume branch line services at the start of the 20th century. The McKeen railmotor was a line of self-propelled gasoline-powered railcars produced between 1905 and 1917. The 200-horsepower (150 kW) engine on the 55-or-70-foot-long (17 or 21 m) units drove only one set of wheels, and the lack of power and traction, the unreliability of their transmissions, and an inability to reverse, were major limitations. General Electric ("GE") was the pioneer of gas-electric railcars: GE in February 1906 rebuilt a wood passenger coach into a gas-electric unit which was placed in trial service on the Delaware and Hudson Railroad. The St. Louis–San Francisco Railway was an early adopter of this technology, placing an initial order for ten gas-electric units in 1910 and seven additional by 1913, giving it the distinction of having the largest fleet of gas-electric motor cars in the country. The petroleum-electric drive control system invented in 1914 by Hermann Lemp, an engineer with GE, became the technological foundation of self-propelled gasoline railcars in the 1920s.

In 1923, the Electro-Motive Company began production of self-propelled railcars, subcontracting bodies to the St. Louis Car Company, prime movers to the Winton Engine Company, and electrical equipment to General Electric. The Pullman Company was subsequently added as a subcontractor for car bodies.

Improvements to railcars were sought by the Pullman Company, who experimented with lightweight designs in partnership with the Ford Motor Company in 1925. They then enlisted the services of pioneering all-metal aircraft designer William Bushnell Stout in 1931 to adapt airplane fuselage design concepts to railcars. Also in 1931 the Budd Company entered into a partnership with the French tire company Michelin to produce lightweight stainless steel Budd–Michelin railcars in the US. Those advances in lightweight railcar design were important steps in the development of the lightweight diesel-electric streamliners of the 1930s.

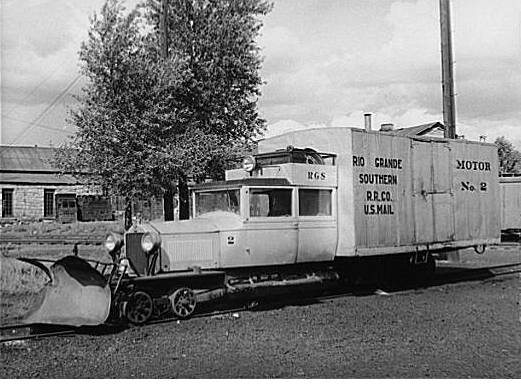
Rio Grande Southern Galloping Goose No. 2

Production of self-propelled railcars dropped with the onset of the Great Depression. However, their low operating costs prompted the construction of the Galloping Goose railcars built by the Rio Grande Southern Railroad (RGS) from used Buick and Pierce-Arrow automobiles with a custom-built cargo box or flatbed behind the body. The RGS built eight Geese in its own shops between 1931 and 1936, including one for the San Cristobal Railroad. The RGS did not use the Galloping Goose name until very late in its history, instead referring to the vehicles as motors and later as buses. According to local folklore, the nickname was coined as a reference to their rocking gait or the goose-like tone of their horns, but rail historian Mallory Hope Ferrell notes that the term galloping goose had previously been used to refer to doodlebugs operating on other railroads, notably the Northern Pacific Railway, in the 1920s. All but one of the RGS Geese have been preserved, with several in operating condition.

Factory production of doodlebugs was revived in 1949 with introduction of the Budd Rail Diesel Car.

The variant name hoodlebug was largely limited to the mid-Atlantic states, particularly Pennsylvania. A former Pennsylvania Railroad bed converted into a hiking trail in Indiana County, Pennsylvania, is named Hoodlebug Trail.

The last remaining Atchison, Topeka and Santa Fe (ATSF) gas-electric doodlebug, M.177, is on display at the City of Los Angeles "Travel Town Museum" in Griffith Park. Two other AT&SF doodlebugs, both converted to diesel-electric locomotion, survive: The M.160 is in the collection of the Museum of the American Railroad in Frisco, Texas; the M.190 is on public display at Doodlebug Park in Belen, New Mexico, south of Albuquerque. Union Pacific M35 is preserved at the Illinois Railway Museum in Union, IL.

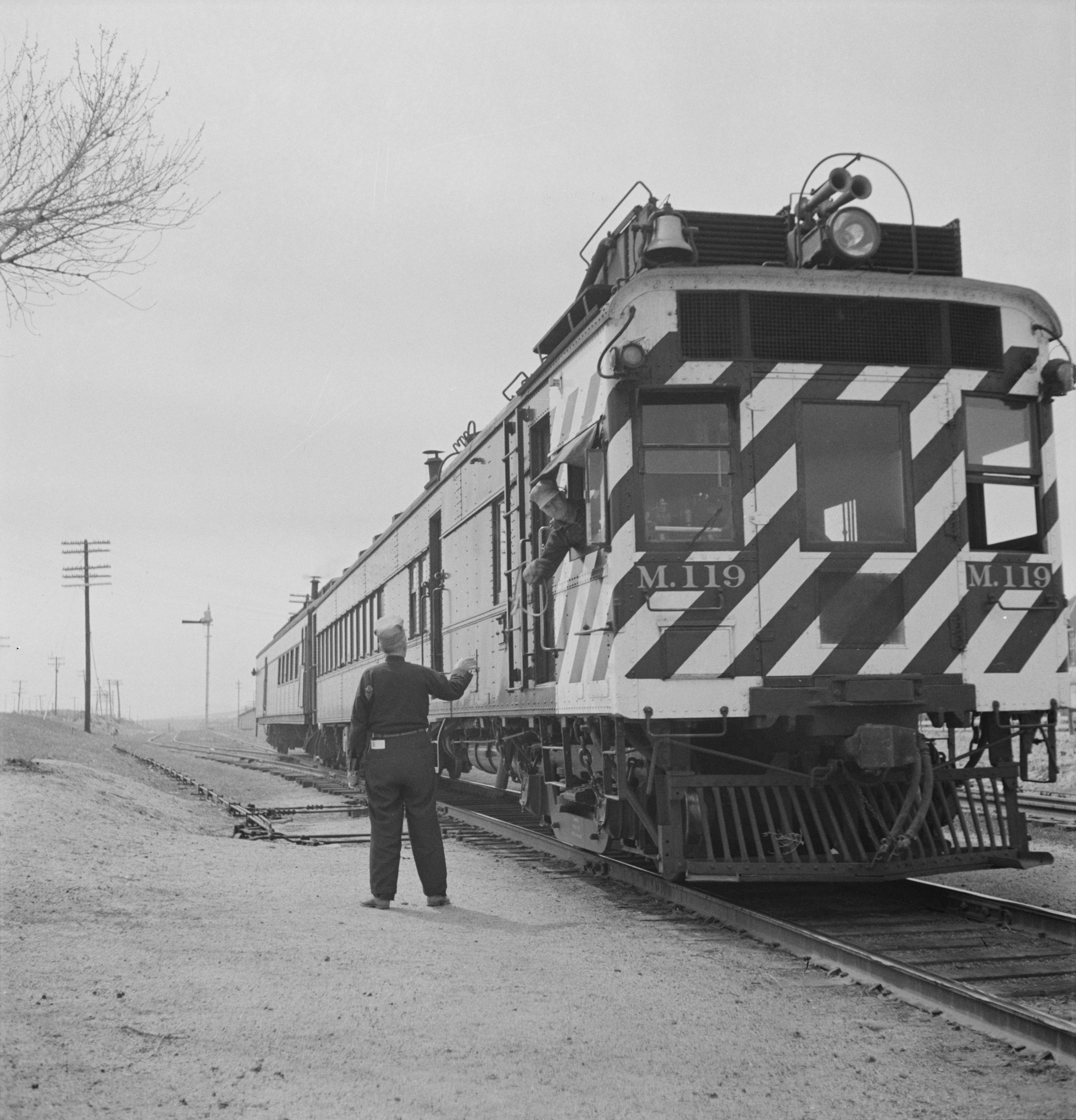
ATSF doodlebug M119, Isleta, New Mexico. 1943

== See also ==
- CPH railmotor
- Diesel Electric railmotor (VR)
- Diesel multiple unit
- Dracar
- Doodlebug disaster
- Edwards Rail Car Company
- FM OP800
- Interurban
- McKeen Motor Car Company
- Steam dummy
- SAL 2027
