= Dracar =

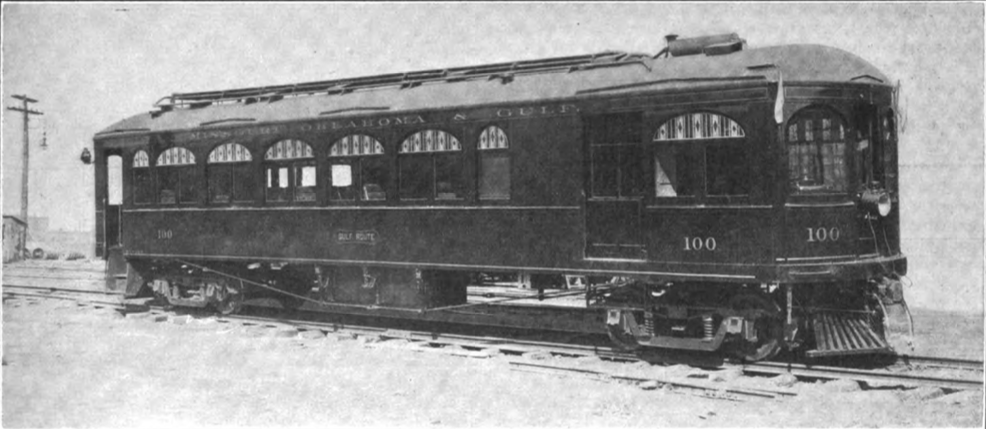
- Missouri, Oklahoma and Gulf No. 100 in 1912

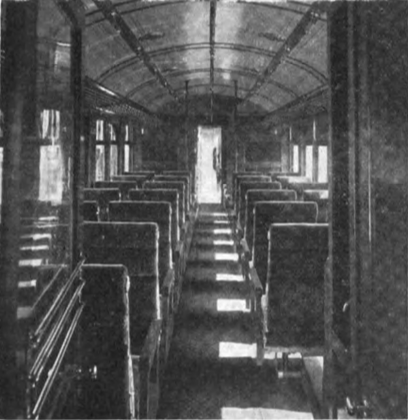
- The passenger compartment of a Dracar
- Manufacturer: Drake Automotice Railway Company
- Number preserved: 0
- Capacity: 44

Specifications
- Car length: 56 feet (17 m)
- Width: 9 feet 6 inches (2.90 m)
- Maximum speed: 40 miles per hour (64 km/h)
- Weight: 65,000 pounds (29,000 kg)
- Engine type: Gasoline-electric
- Cylinder count: 6
- Power output: 90 horsepower (67 kW)
- Track gauge: 4 ft 8 1/2 in (1,435 mm)

The Dracar was a self-propelled gasoline railcar built by the Drake Railway Automotrice Company in the early 20th century.

== Design ==
The Dracar was 56 feet (17 m) long and could be operated from either end. The engine compartment occupied the front 7 feet 3 inches (2.21 m), followed by a baggage compartment, and then two passenger sections. As delivered to the Missouri, Oklahoma and Gulf Railway, the Dracar was built with a removable partition to segregate black and white passengers. The white or "first class" section could seat 30; the "colored" section 14. Both sections contained a restroom. The design was based on cars built by the French Westinghouse company for the Arad-Csanad Railway in Hungary. The St Louis Car Company manufactured the car bodies and trucks. The car was designed for 25 miles per hour (40 km/h) operation; its maximum speed was 40 miles per hour (64 km/h).

Drake also designed a larger type with a maximum capacity of 73 passengers. This car was powered by a 140 horsepower (100 kW) engine.

== History ==
The Missouri, Oklahoma and Gulf Railway took delivery of several Dracars and employed them on 30–50-mile (48–80 km) runs. Examples included Muskogee–Henryetta, Oklahoma, Durant, Oklahoma–Denison, Texas, and Muskogee–Wagoner, Oklahoma. By 1913 the MO&G had acquired five cars. Fuel efficiency was 3.3 miles per US gallon (71 L/100 km; 4.0 mpg_{‑imp}). Each Dracar had a crew of three: motorman, flagman, and conductor.

== See also ==
- Doodlebug (rail car)
