= Hermann Lemp =

Swiss-American electrical engineer (1862-1954)

- Born: August 8, 1862; Switzerland
- Died: March 31, 1954 (aged 91)
- Occupation: Electrical engineer

Hermann Lemp born: Heinrich Joseph Hermann Lemp (August 8, 1862 – March 31, 1954) was a Swiss-American electrical engineer; he is credited as the inventor of the modern system of diesel electric traction co-ordination and control.

Born and educated in Switzerland, he emigrated to America aged 19, hoping to work with T. A. Edison. He joined Edison General Electric and worked with Edison on electrical projects, including one of Edison's first electric locomotives. A short while later he joined Elihu Thomson, of the Thomson-Houston Company. That company became part of General Electric (GE), to which Edison acted as consultant.

He met Rudolf Diesel on his visit to the USA in 1911, and was an invited observer at the trials of Diesel's direct-drive 1,000 hp (750 kW) locomotive in 1912. The diesel engine was too powerful for the mechanical gears. Lemp, with his colleagues, persuaded GE that diesel traction had a future, but that a non-mechanical transmission system was required. The proposed transmission was electrical, using the diesel engine to power a generator that supplied current to the traction motors. However, such a system would need a device to coordinate engine and generator output. He invented one, patented in 1914. This patent provided the basis for the systems used by many other locomotive and diesel makers.

GE did not enter the locomotive field then, but did authorize the purchase of Junker's patent for high speed diesel engines, and the manufacture of some small experimental locomotives.

However, GE's later, successful locomotives used Lemp's improved system, patented after World War I. The first GE diesel electric locomotive was a demonstrator, made to Lemp's specifications by a trio of GE, ALCO and Ingersoll-Rand, who made, respectively, the electrical equipment, the body and the engine. This machine started trials around New York City in 1924, sales of similar locomotives starting from 1925.

His system of control is also used in other applications apart from railways, such as on giant earth-moving equipment.

Lemp died at his home in Ridgewood, New Jersey, on March 31, 1954.
