= Pauline (railcar) =

French railcars series built in the 1930s

Pauline or Charentaise were the nicknames of the railcars series built in 1930s by The Entreprises Industrielles Charentaises in Aytré. Initially developed on the initiative of the Chemins de fer du Midi, these railcars were subsequently ordered by various French railway companies, some of them joining the SNCF. They were the first series of French diesel-powered railcars.

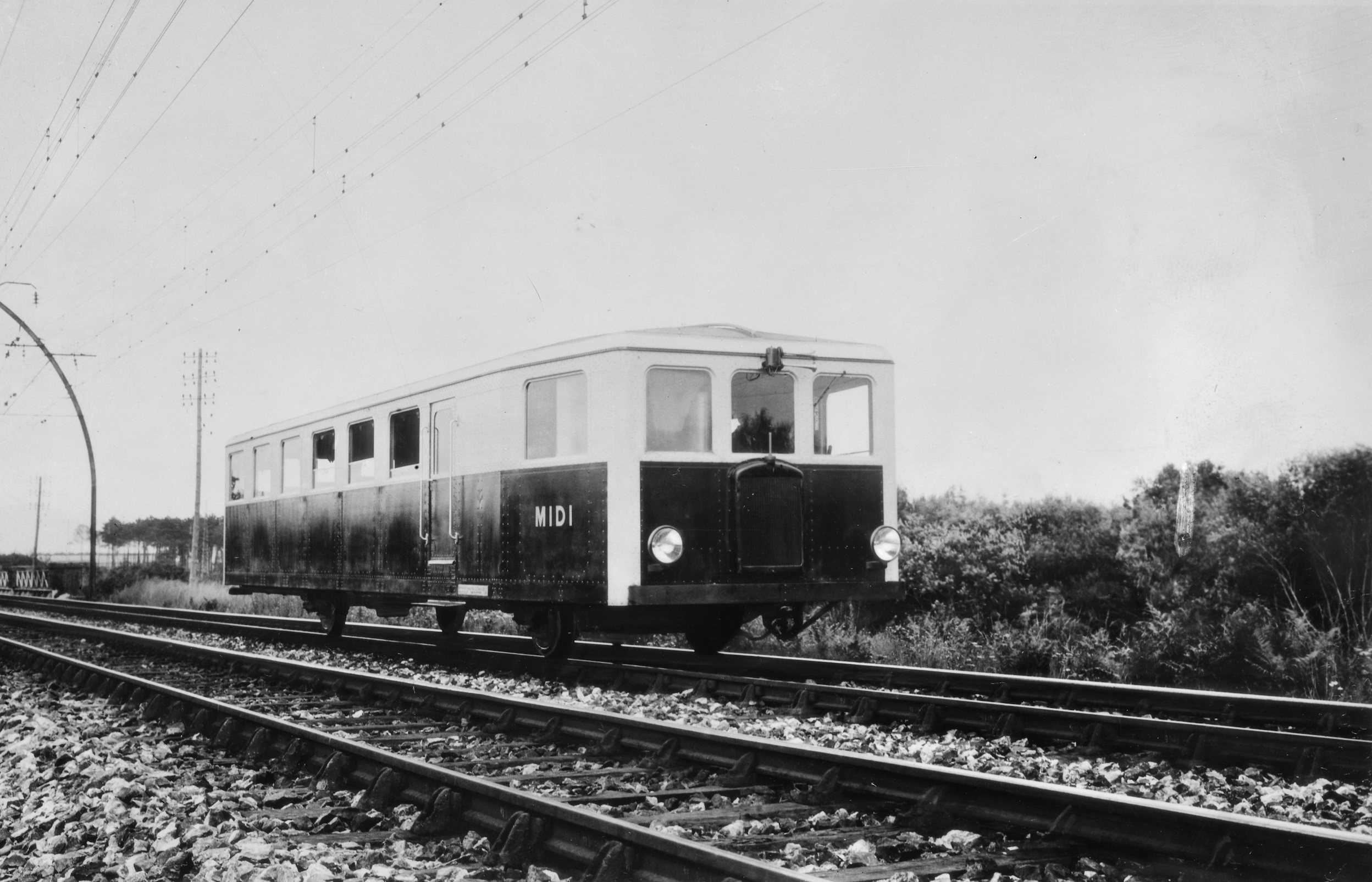
Prototype of Pauline (type 1) railcars under the ogives of the Midi catenary.

Several series were produced, each with technical and structural differences, but all based on a very light body design using riveted aluminum and duralium sheet metal. These different series are known as type 1 (prototype), type 1 N, types 2 and 2 bis, type 3 N, and type 4 N. Among these railcars, the XC 11000 is a set of nineteen units from the type 2 and 2 bis series, ordered by the AL, State, PLM, and Midi (then PO-Midi) networks and integrated into the SNCF workforce when it was created in 1938.

These railcars, which entered service gradually in the early 1930s, were mostly written off after the war. Only a few XC 11000s remained in SNCF inventories until 1952, one unit being preserved from scrap until the mid-1970s when it was de-motorized and used as an escort car for a tunnel-sensing train. No Pauline railcars have been preserved.

The Pauline railcars bear witness to a pivotal period for the French railroads, which had to face stiff competition from automobile transport, which was cheaper for both users and operators. They were an efficient and economical response for the railways of the time to the closure of secondary lines due to the operating costs of traditional steam trains.

== Type 1 (prototype) ==
Pauline
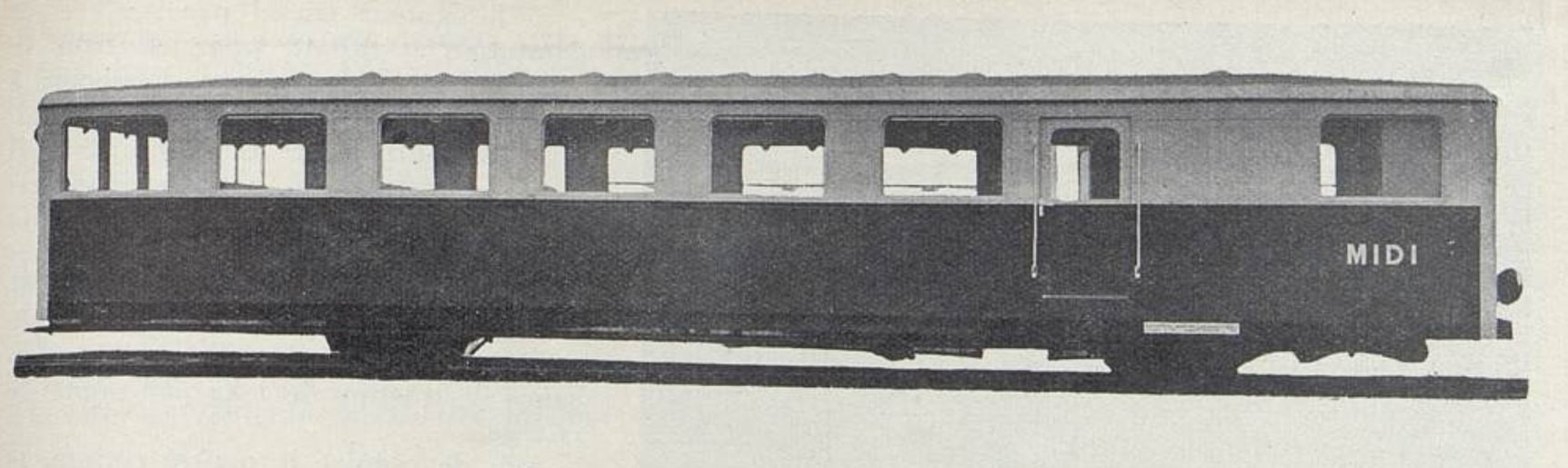
- Pauline Charentaise
- Stock type: 1 Diesel engine
- In service: 1931
- Family name: ZZt 23501 (Midi) ZZEt 23301 (PO-Midi) ZZC 10001 (SNCF)
- Constructed: 1931
- Capacity: 61 seats

Specifications
- Car length: 15.35 metres (50.4 ft)
- Doors: 2 side doors
- Axle load: 1,435 mm
- Power output: 80 hp at 1,500 rpm

=== Creation context ===
The 1930s saw the significant development of automobile and air transport, and competition with the railroads became increasingly intense. As these means of transport became more accessible and democratized, the operation of secondary railroad lines with steam trains became less and less profitable for French railways.

In response to competition from cars and buses, railways and carmakers ordered light, self-propelled railcars to replace steam traction on lightly trafficked lines. This was the concept of the railcar, still sometimes referred to at the time as a self-propelled train. The first series developed were largely inspired by buses before railcars gradually broke away from their road-based origins.

Given the success of the railcar, in the late 1920s Michelin designed lightweight railcars equipped with pneumatic tires to replace steel wheels. While this new solution improved passenger comfort and provided better grip between the wheel and the rail, it also severely limited axle load, making it necessary to increase the number of wheels mounted on the bogies and limit the vehicle's weight. Several series of railcars were produced by Michelin, grouped under the nickname Michelines. Dunlop, Michelin's competitor, drew inspiration from them to create the Dunlop-Fouga railcar in 1935.

=== Controls ===
André Ménétrier, chief engineer for equipment and traction at Compagnie du Midi, was asked by Jean-Raoul Paul, director of the company, to draw up specifications for an order for a rail “bus ”. This railcar, capable of carrying around sixty people, was intended to provide efficient and economical rail operations on short lines.

In 1930, the Compagnie du Midi ordered a single example of the prototype railcar, designed and built by EIC in collaboration with the Compagnie Lilleoise de moteurs (CLM) and the Société de l'Aluminium Français. It was delivered in September 1931.

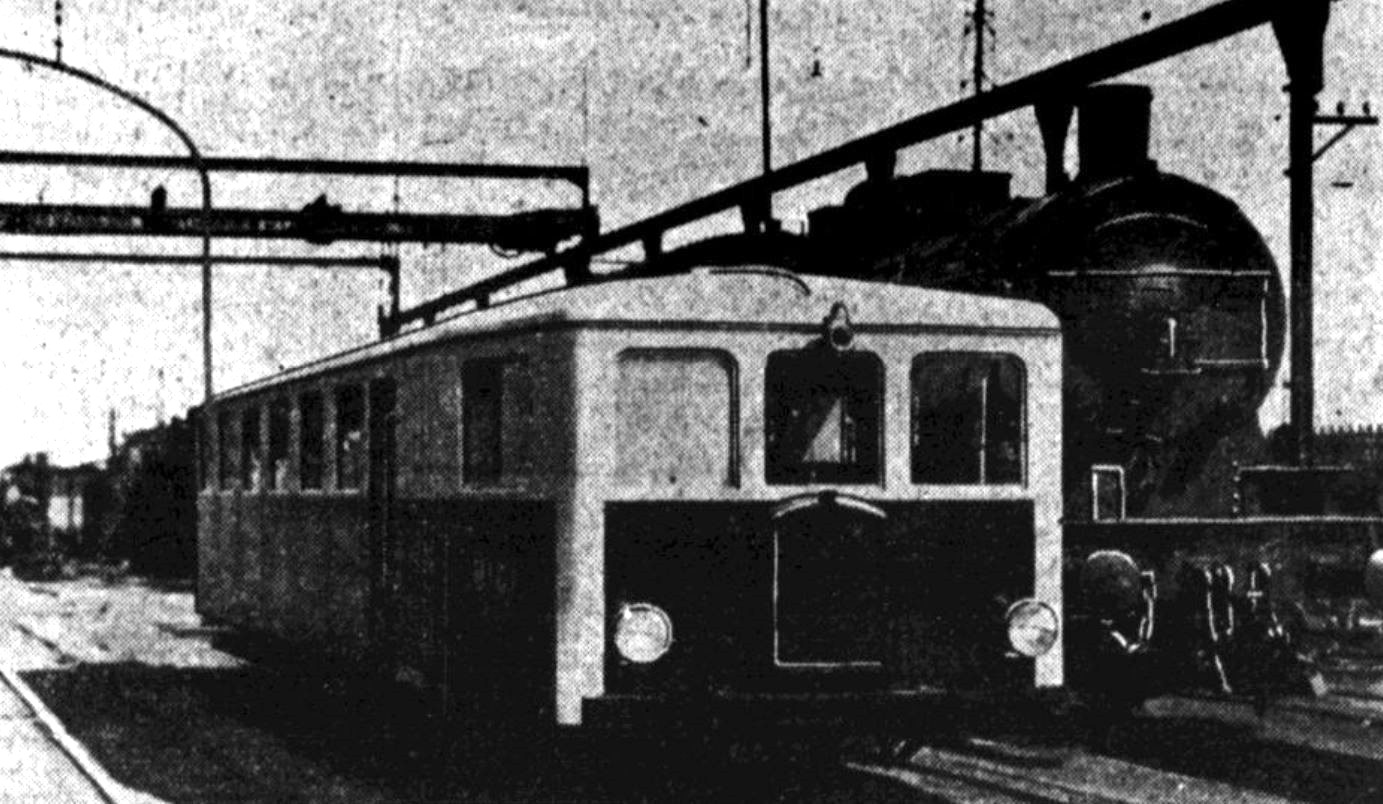
Delivery of the Pauline in September 1931.

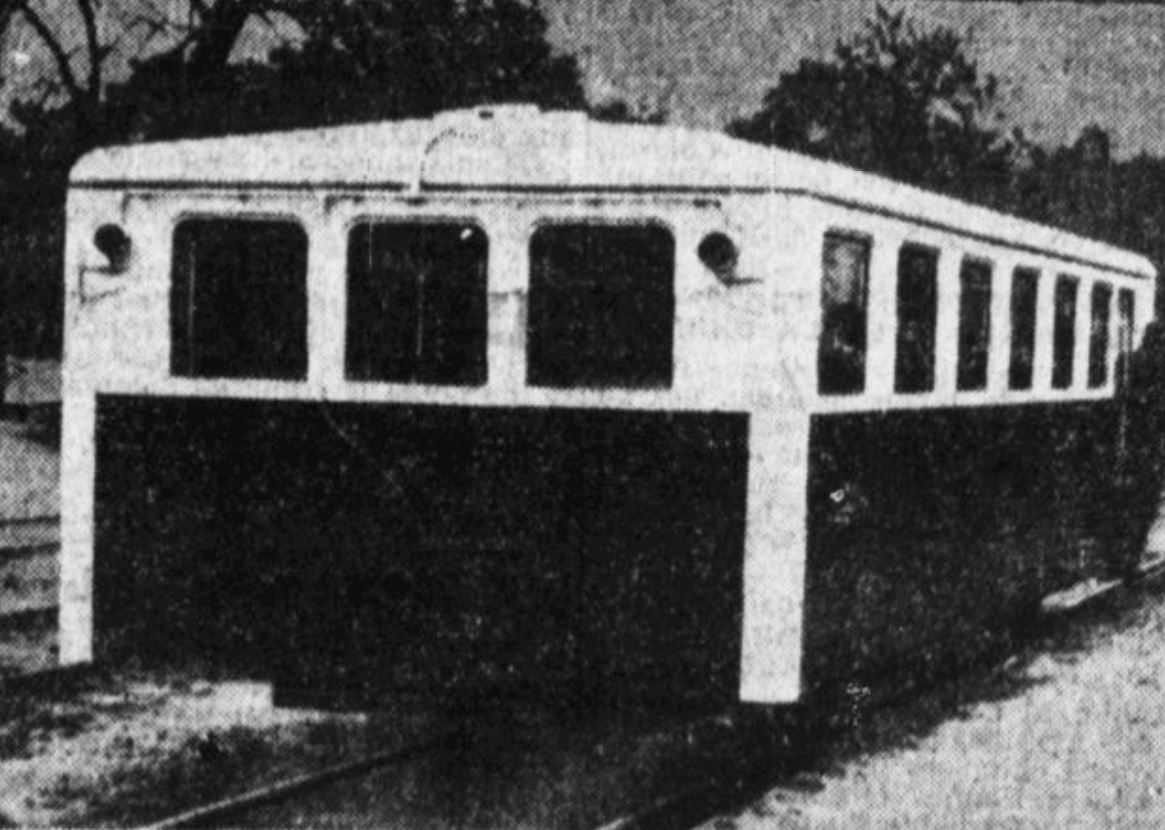
La Pauline in Le Verdon station on October 27, 1931

The prototype, designated Type 1, was presented to the press on October 27, 1931, during a trip between Bordeaux-Saint-Louis and Le Verdon. The railcar leaves the Bordeaux-Saint-Louis station, following the express for the 100 km to Le Verdon. With stops in Bruges, Pauillac, Lesparre and Soulac-sur-Mer, the journey takes 1 h 45. The return journey is an omnibus mission which, despite stopping at each of the 22 stations on the line, takes just 1 h 40, five minutes less than the express and almost half the time taken by the steam omnibus train to cover the same distance.

The unique Pauline type 1 is registered ZZt 23501 at Midi, then renumbered ZZEt 23301 when the PO-Midi was created. The SNCF assigns it the registration ZZC 10001 (C being the EIC manufacturer's code).

=== Surname ===
The prototype was quickly nicknamed Pauline, in reference to Jean-Raoul Paul, its fervent promoter.

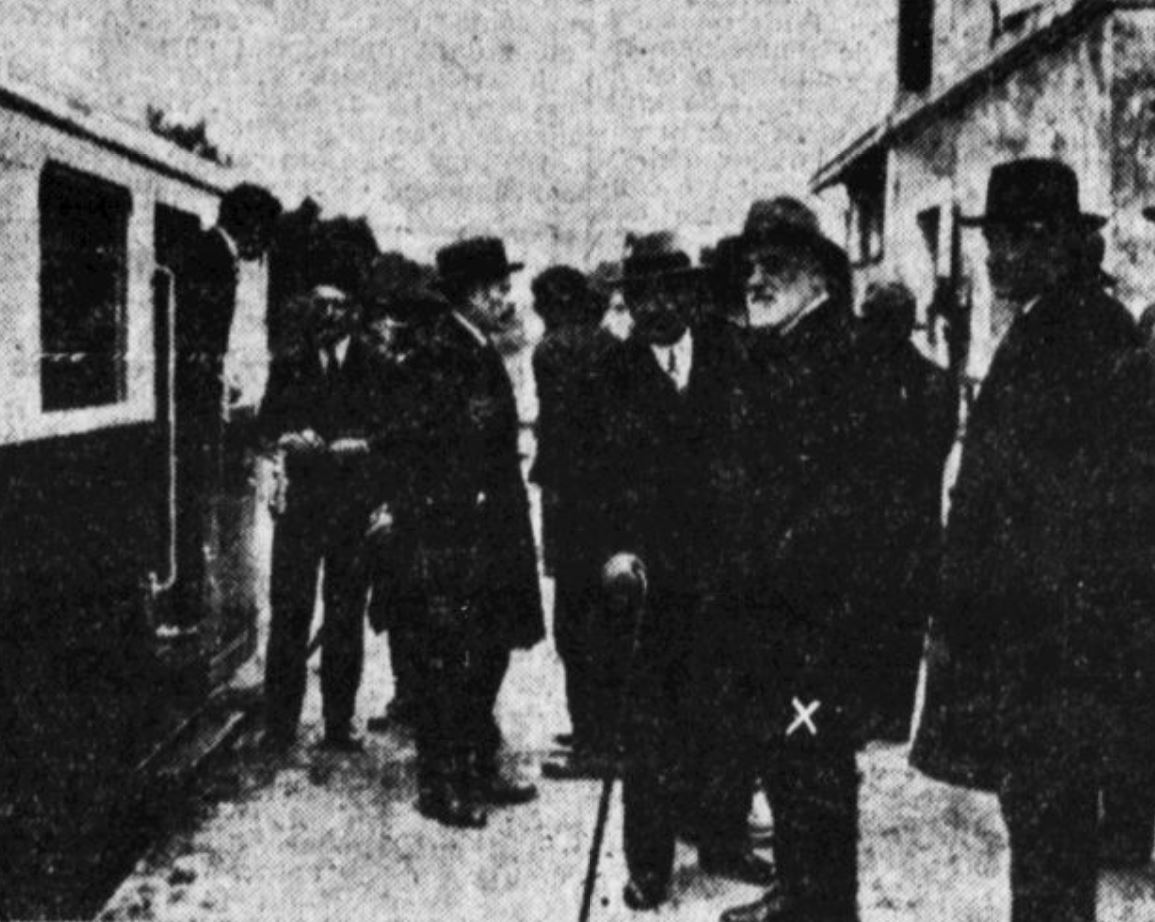
Jean-Raoul Paul (cross) next to the Pauline on October 27, 1931

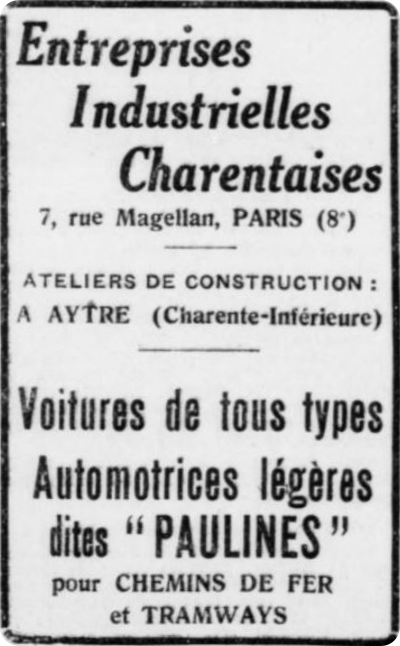
Advertising for EIC (1932).

Later, other railcars produced by EIC also inherited this nickname, notably those of the Midi and then the PO-Midi. The Eastern and State railcars, types 3 N and 4 N, received the nickname Charentaise, about the manufacturer of these machines, while at the PLM both nicknames were used interchangeably, although the railroader's preferred nickname was Pauline.

=== Description and features ===
The frame and body of the Pauline railcar prototype are constructed from a variety of duralium sections and sheets. The frame and body together form a tubular structure designed to ensure strength and avoid local buckling.

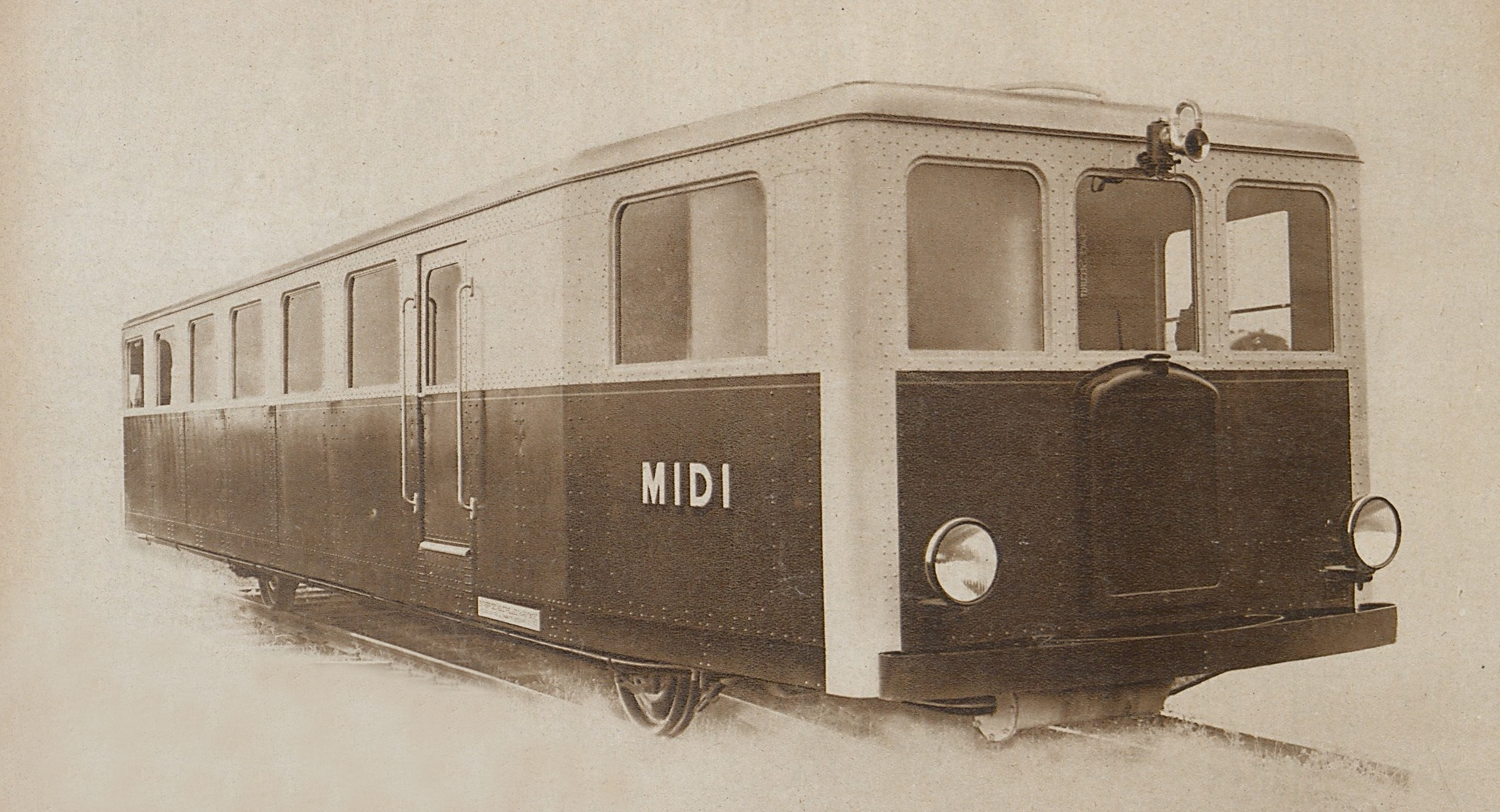
Front three-quarter view of Pauline type 1.

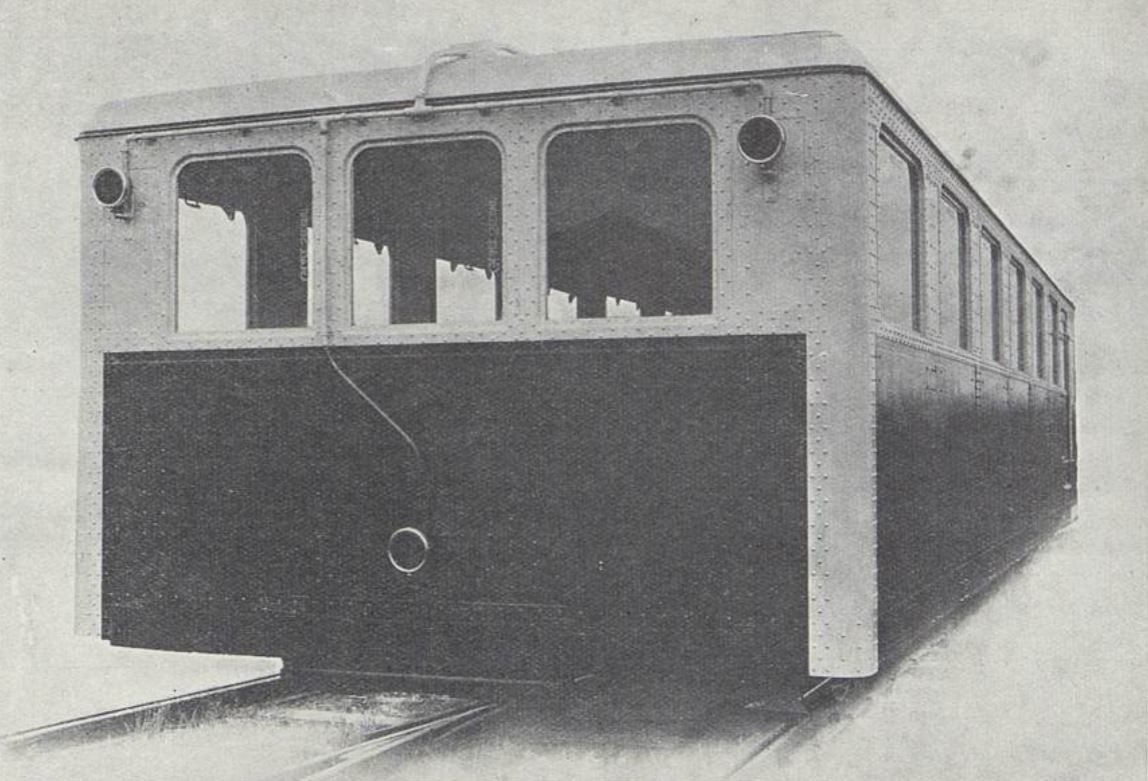
Three-quarter rear view of Pauline type 1.

The faces of the machine are made from 2 mm thick sheet metal. All connections are made using duralium rivets, either cold-applied or preheated to 180 °C. The widespread use of aluminum and its derivatives enabled the railcar's mass to be significantly reduced, and lower-powered engines to be used, while still guaranteeing high traction performance. This metal was also of interest for the body's resistance to impact - able to absorb a large amount of energy - and the alumina layer that immediately formed on the bare metal effectively protected it from corrosion. However, aluminum was not used on a large scale for later railway equipment, steel being widely preferred despite its higher density.

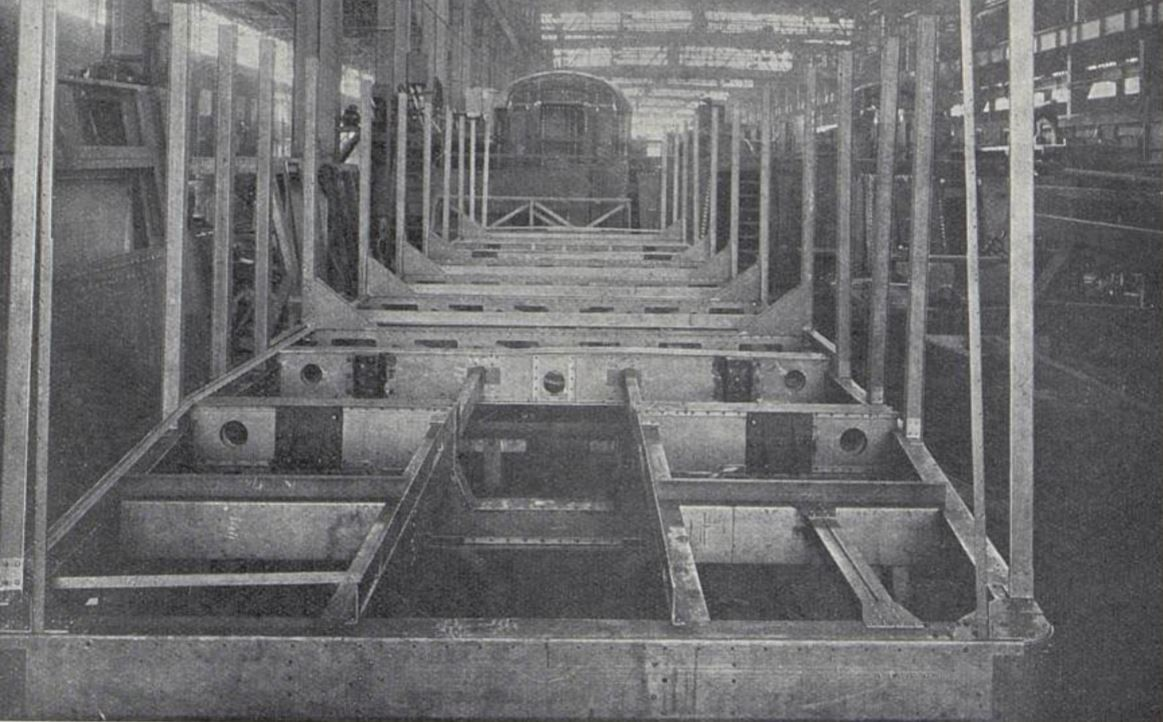
Welded section frame.

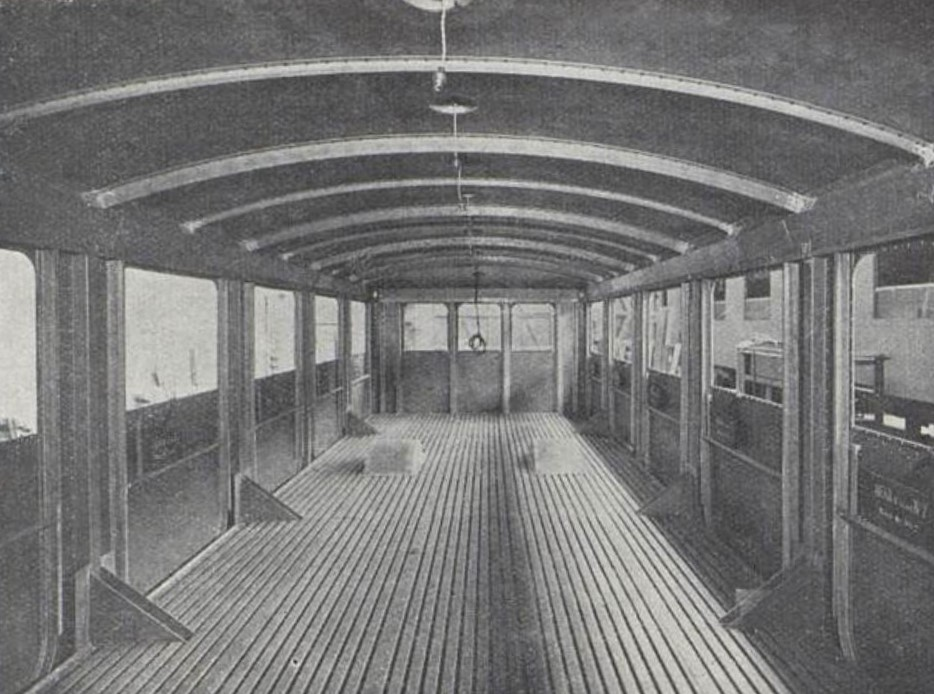
Body structure.

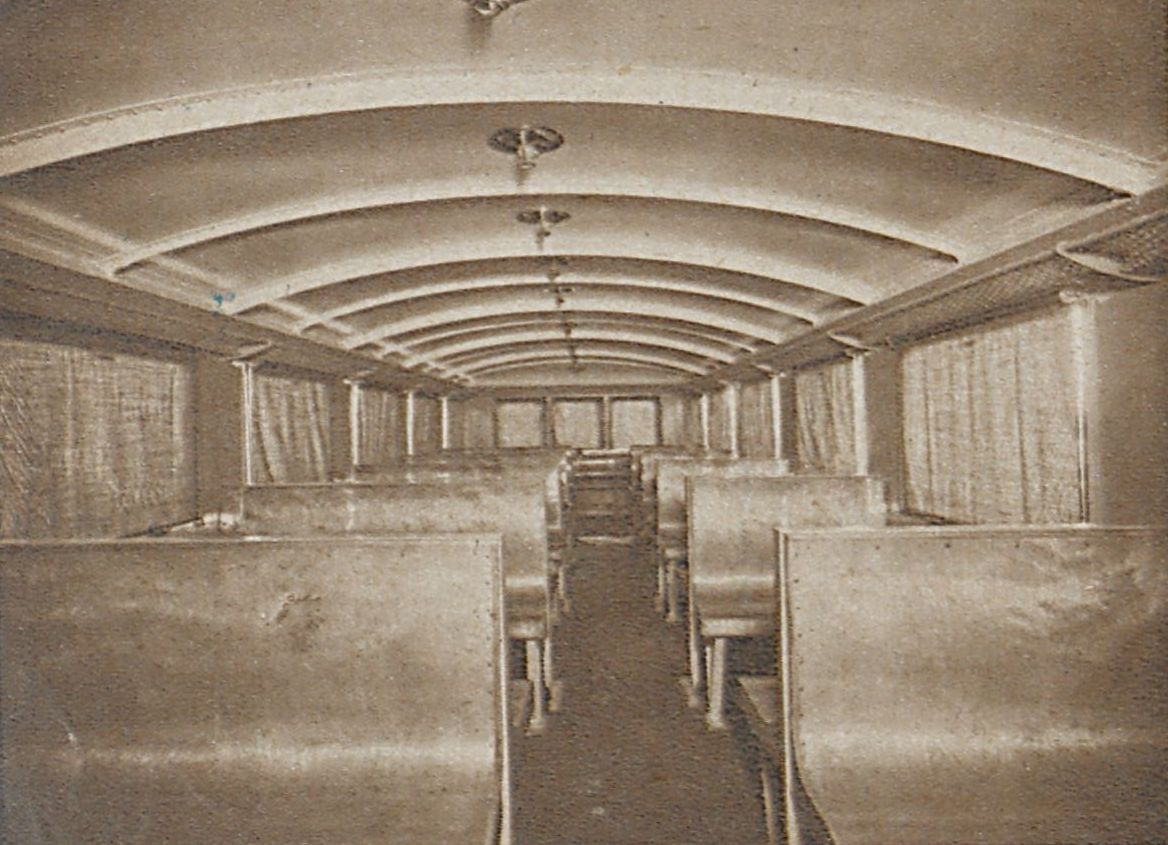
Interior design.

The chassis rests on two 750 mm axles spaced 6.805 m apart; suspension between the body and the SKF axles is provided by leaf springs. Numerous press articles from the early 1930s were devoted to explaining and demonstrating why wheel-rail adhesion had been chosen instead of Michelin's pneurail, which was seen at the time as a technology of the future. The advantages presented argue in favor of the iron wheel: limitation of the number of wheels, activation of track circuits and signaling, excellent track holding and use of sandpits to increase the wheel-rail adhesion coefficient.

Braking was initially provided by cast-iron brake shoes actuated by servo brakes. In the weeks following the press launch, this system was replaced by Charlestop drum brakes, a technology derived from aeronautics, to further reduce the weight of the machine.

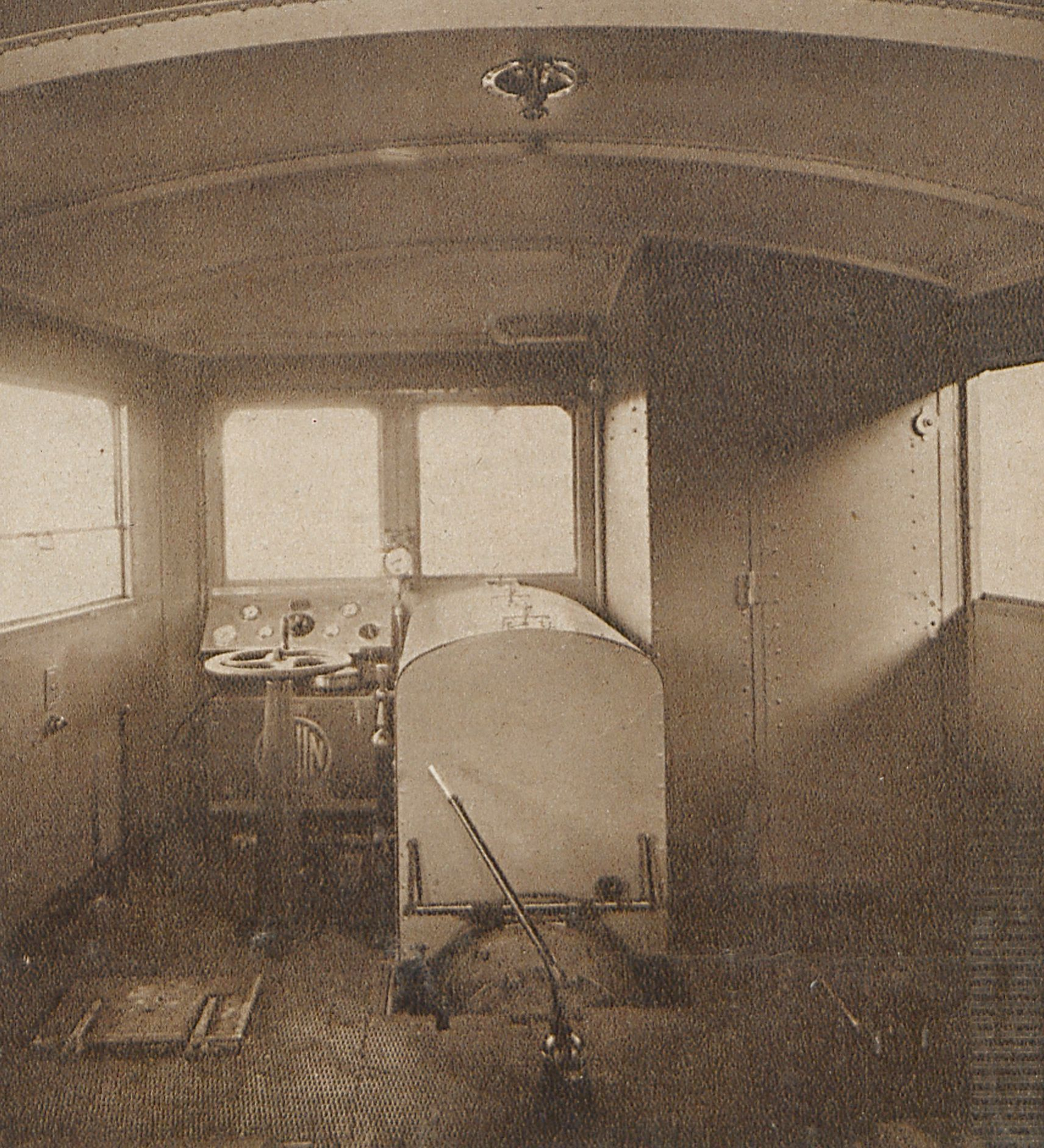
Front end with, from left to right, the driver's cab, engine hood and toilet cubicle.

The prototype is equipped with a single driver's cab, making it non-reversible: it has to be turned around at the end of a run to start again in the opposite direction. The railcar's low centre-to-centre distance enables it to be turned around on a small turntable.

The interior layout accommodates 61 passengers seated in a single class on varnished plywood-covered benches offering rudimentary comfort to say the least. The luggage compartment can carry a ton of cargo or six standing passengers. The front end houses the driver's cab, the engine compartment - covered by a hood - and a toilet.

The railcar is powered by a CLM type 85 LC 3 engine, manufactured under license in France from a Junkers model. This is a three-cylinder, two-stroke engine rated at 80 hp at 1,500 rpm, and weighing just 480 kg thanks to the use of aluminum alloys. The engine is cooled by a water circuit running through a radiator located at the front of the machine, which also heats the passenger compartment via a bypass circuit. The flywheel is bolted to a clutch controlled by the driver with a pedal, which is connected to the Minerva four-speed gearbox - including reverse - enabling speeds of 20 km/h in first, 48 km/h in second and 95 km/h in third (in direct engagement with a unitary transmission ratio). A shaft transmits the tractive effort to the rear axle via a bevel gear.

The gearbox lever is hinged through the floor directly to the gearbox cover: it is operated by the driver, seated next to it on a rudimentary farm-type seat.

Pauline type 1 Midi railcar livery.

The Pauline type 1 du Midi sports a green and white livery, similar to that of the Paulines type 2 bis of the same network.

=== Services performed ===
Before her maiden voyage on October 27, 1931, between Bordeaux-Saint-Louis and Le Verdon, the first Pauline du Midi completed several test runs, covering more than 2,500 km. On February 27, 1931, she was presented to Cyrille Grimpret during a round trip between Bordeaux and Marmande. On September 4 and 5, 1931, a trip between Bordeaux and Montréjeau through the steep ramps of the Pyrenees - in particular the Capvern ramp - and at full load, enabled us to calculate the machine's fuel consumption on difficult track profiles.

The prototype joined the staff of the Mont-de-Marsan autorail center a few weeks after its presentation to the press. In 1933, it was joined by four Paulines type 1 N and eight type 2 bis to serve the Mont-de-Marsan star. These railcars cover services from Mont-de-Marsan to Marmande, Dax, Nérac and Morcenx, as well as omnibus services between Saint-Sever and Hagetmau, and between Marmande and Eymet.

From July to September 1932, the Pauline was used by the Compagnie du Midi, in agreement with the Société des voies ferrées des Landes, for a trial campaign in Sunday service between Mont-de-Marsan and the Mimizan-Plage station. Satisfied with the results of these trials, the Conseil Général subsequently considered acquiring thirteen Pauline railcars (including three for metre gauge) of type 2 bis or similar, to provide a fleet of railcars for the department's local railroads (chemin de fer de Luxey à Mont-de-Marsan, voies ferrées des Landes and steam tramways de la Chalosse et du Béarn), a project which never materialized.

In August 1943, the SNCF asked the Secretary of State for Industrial Production and Communications for authorization to sell some of its railcars to German secondary networks through a Franco-Romanian company. The unique Pauline type 1 was one of the railcars considered for sale, the reasons given being its non-reversibility and the fact that it was a one-off prototype. However, the sale was never finalized.

The inventory of equipment as of December 31, 1946, indicates the existence of a project to demotorize the prototype and transform it into a railcar trailer under the registration number RZ 10201. This project was subsequently canceled, and the railcar was finally written off in 1948.

Pauline type 1N
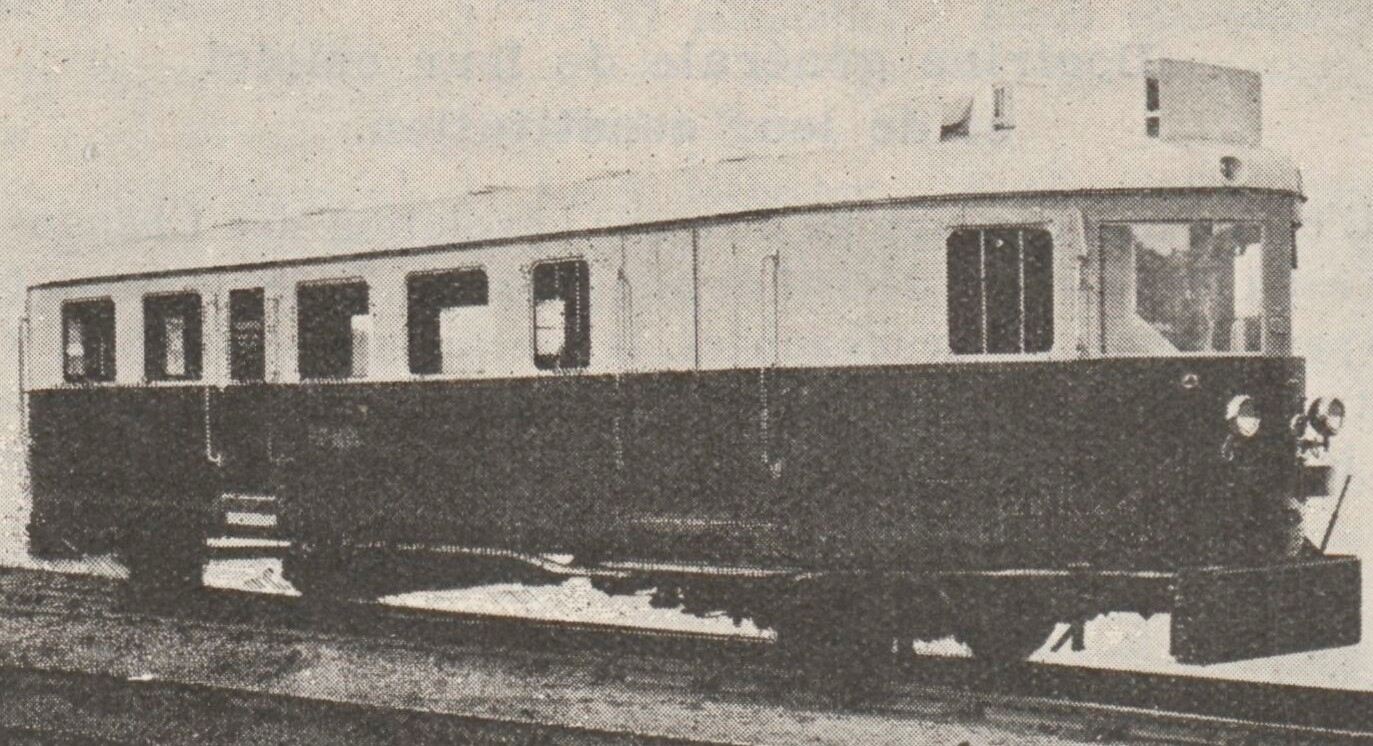
- Pauline type 1 N from PO-Midi.
- Stock type: ZZt 23501 (Midi) ZZEt 23301 (PO-Midi) ZZC 10001 (SNCF)
- In service: 1931
- Capacity: 61 seats
- Operators: AL, State, PLM, Midi, PO-Midi then SNCF

Specifications
- Car length: 12 metres (39 ft)
- Doors: 2 side doors
- Weight: 6.5 t
- Prime mover: diesel
- Power output: 80 hp at 1,500 rpm

== Type 1 N ==
=== Controls ===
Shortly before its merger with Paris-Orléans, Midi ordered four Pauline type 1 N railcars from EIC. These cars incorporate some of the improvements introduced on the Paulines types 2 and 2 bis, which, although higher numbered, were ordered almost a year before the Paulines 1 N.

At Le Midi, the four railcars are numbered ZZ 23511 to 23514, before being renumbered ZZEt 23311 to 23314 at Le PO-Midi. The SNCF assigns them ZZC 10111 to 10114.

At least one Pauline 1 N was in operation on the Chemins de fer économiques (SE) network in Gironde in the late 1950s.

=== Description and features ===
Although built after the Paulines types 2 and 2 bis, the Paulines 1 N du Midi are based on the two-axle design of the prototype. The car's light weight is ensured by the use of duralium sheet metal riveted to a U frame.

Unlike the prototype, the railcar is reversible, with a driver's cab at each end. In addition, the front and rear faces are profiled, far from the parallelepiped shape of type 1. The interior faces and ceiling are made of sheet aluminum. The floor is made of fluted duralium sheet, riveted to the crossmembers and covered with cork and linoleum in the passenger compartment.

This passenger compartment offers forty-three seats and twelve standing places. With a ceiling height of 2.204 m, it is more comfortable than the prototype's passenger compartment, which has a much lower ceiling.

The body rests on two axles housed in SKFroller-boxes, 8,042 mm apart. The wheels are 850 mm in diameter. Only the front axle (on the drive side) is driven, the rear axle being simply load-bearing.

The Charlestop braking system has been retained: for each wheel, two inner shoes rotate around a fixed axis with the axleboxes. The system is controlled by a hydraulic circuit which is actuated by the brake lever via a deformable bellows generator, while the release position is maintained by springs. A hand lever controls emergency braking by activating the same system. In addition, on slopes, drivers are encouraged in the machine's operating manual to use the engine brake - injection cut-off - as the brake linings cannot ensure prolonged braking due to heating, which reduces their coefficient of friction and therefore their efficiency.

Pauline type 1 N railcar livery for the PO-Midi.

Paulines du PO-Midi are painted in a deep blue paint scheme for the lower body and gray for the upper body, with a white roof.

=== Services performed ===
The Paulines 1 N du Midi are grouped together at the Mont-de-Marsan rail center, and serve the star around the town in rotation with the Pauline type 1 and the eight Paulines type 2 bis. These railcars provide services between Mont-de-Marsan and Marmande, Dax, Nérac and Morcenx on the one hand, and omnibus connections between Saint-Sever and Hagetmau and between Marmande and Eymet on the other.

As with the prototype, in 1943 the SNCF considered selling the four Paulines 1 N to German secondary networks. They were criticized for their poor track-holding, low capacity, and expensive brake system maintenance. However, the sale was not finalized.

Along with Paulines types 2 and 2 bis, Paulines 1 N were the only ones to return to post-war service. A project to demotorize the ZZC 10111 and 10112 railcars and transform them into railcar trailers with RZ 10211 and 10212 registration numbers was launched in 1946, but never came to fruition. That same year, railcars ZZC 10113 and 10114 were still on the Mont-de-Marsan depot's roster, although the reformed ZZC 10114 was used as a service vehicle.

== Types 2 and 2 bis ==
=== Controls ===
Pauline types 2 and 2 bis
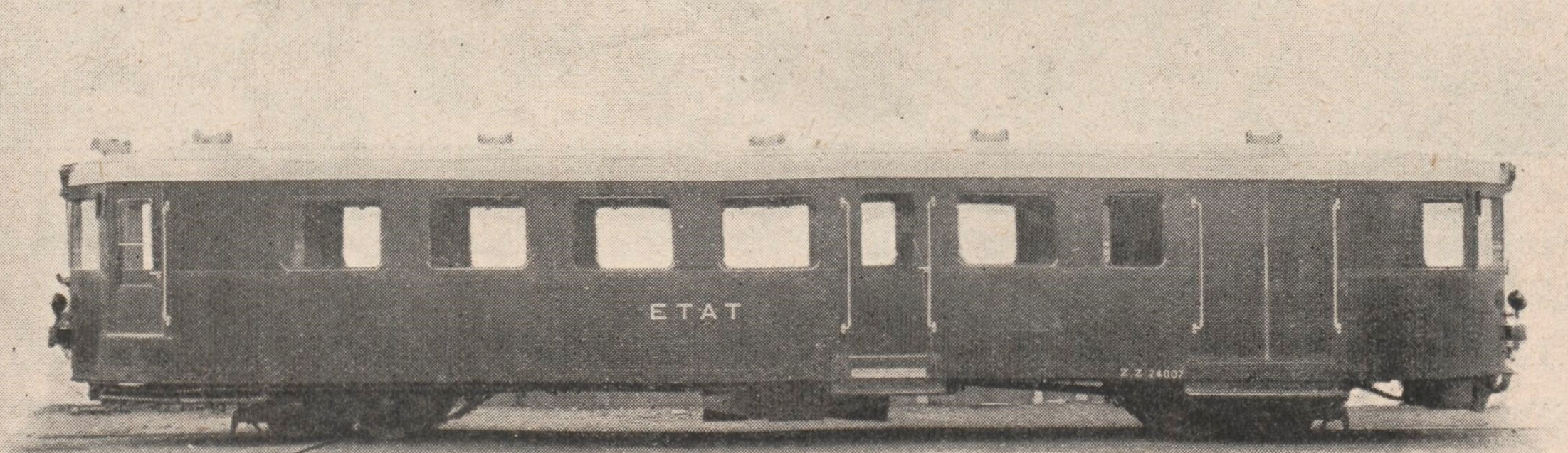
- Stock type: ZZt 23511 à 23514 (Midi) ZZEt 23311 à 23314 (PO-Midi) ZZC 10111 à 10114 (SNCF)
- In service: 1931
- Manufacturers: Midi, PO-Midi then SNCF
- Assembly: France
- Constructed: 1933-1934
- Entered service: 1933-1934
- Capacity: 60 (type 2) 50 (type 2 bis)
- Operators: AL, État, PLM, Midi, PO-Midi then SNCF

Specifications
- Car length: 15.35 metres (50.4 ft)
- Doors: 2
- Weight: 9.5 t (type 2) 11.33 t (type 2 bis)
- Power output: 80 hp at 1,500 rpm

In 1931, PLM launched a competition with eight manufacturers to design, manufacture, and deliver diesel-powered railcars with 40 or 60 seats. After receiving bids from the manufacturers, the company announced that it was ordering four Pauline railcars from EIC, with a single driver's cab, a bogie-mounted chassis at the front and a tag axle at the rear, and a wheelbase of 10.8 m28. Turning the vehicle around would have required a turntable or the use of a special cart to lift the rear of the vehicle28. In the end, two type 2 railcars - originally intended for the Algerian PLM - and four type 2 bis railcars were delivered to PLM.

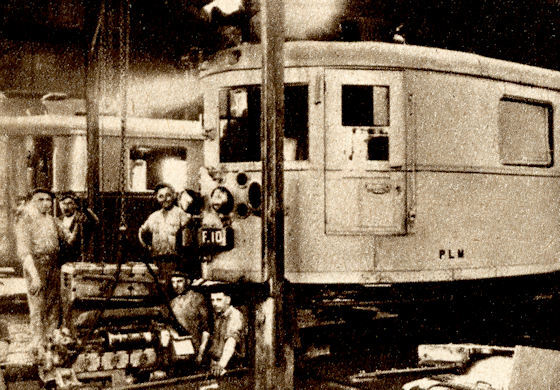
Pauline type 2 in maintenance at the PLM workshops in Alès

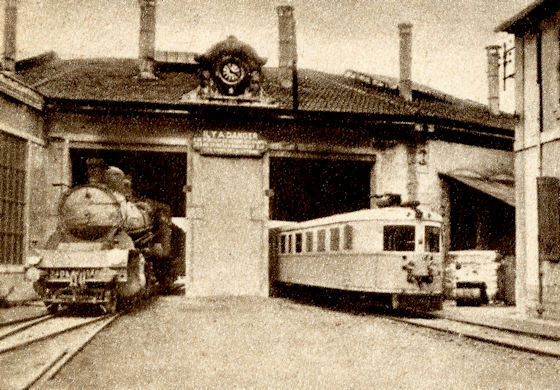
240 A PLM and Pauline type 2 in Alès.

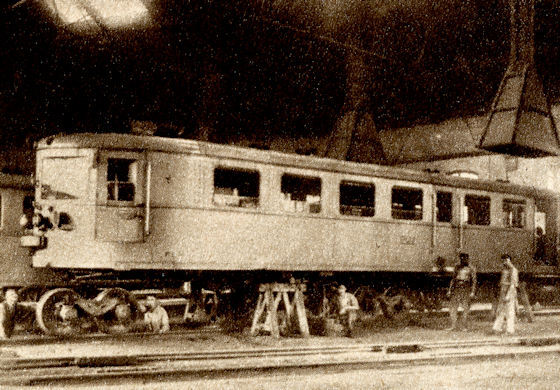
Lifting a Pauline type 2 at the PLM workshops in Alès.

SNCF registration 1948

AL orders a single type 2 railcar from EIC. It went into service in March 1933. On July 1, 1933, the AL organized a test run between Strasbourg and Saint-Louis for local government representatives and the press. The run included three railcars: a Renault, a De Dietrich and the Charentaise. The AL's only Pauline was sold back to the PLM on September 6, 1937.

In April 1933, the French State Railways took delivery of four Pauline type 2 bis railcars. One of these was presented at the Paris-Saint-Lazare station in May 1933 as part of the Exposition des automotrices des chemins de fer de l'État. The aim of this exhibition was to show the development of the company's self-propelled and hauled passenger rolling stock since 1921. Exhibits included a Renault VH, several Michelines, a Bugatti, a Schneider railcar, a double-decker État.

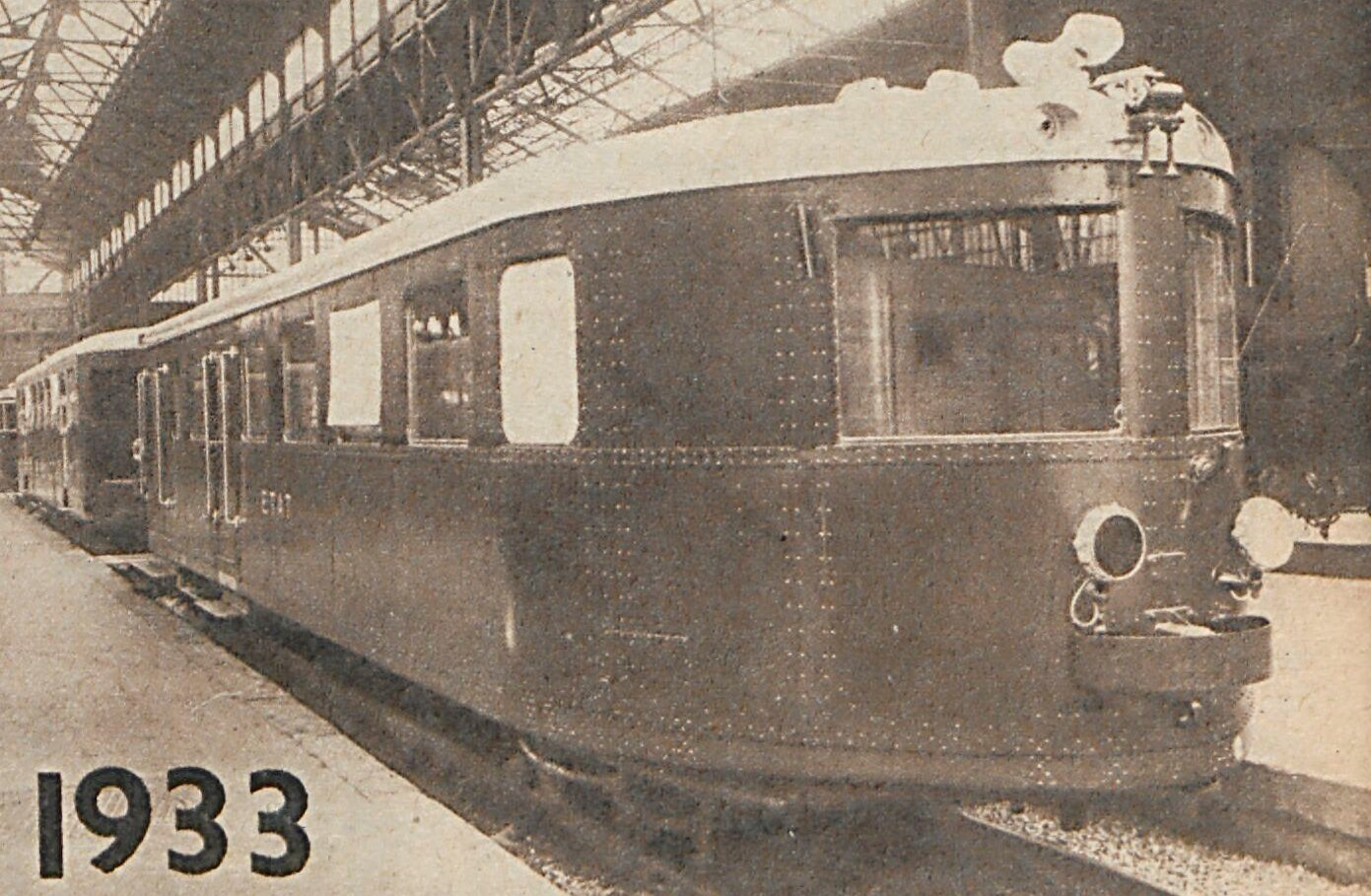
Pauline 2 bis de l'État on display at Saint-Lazare station.

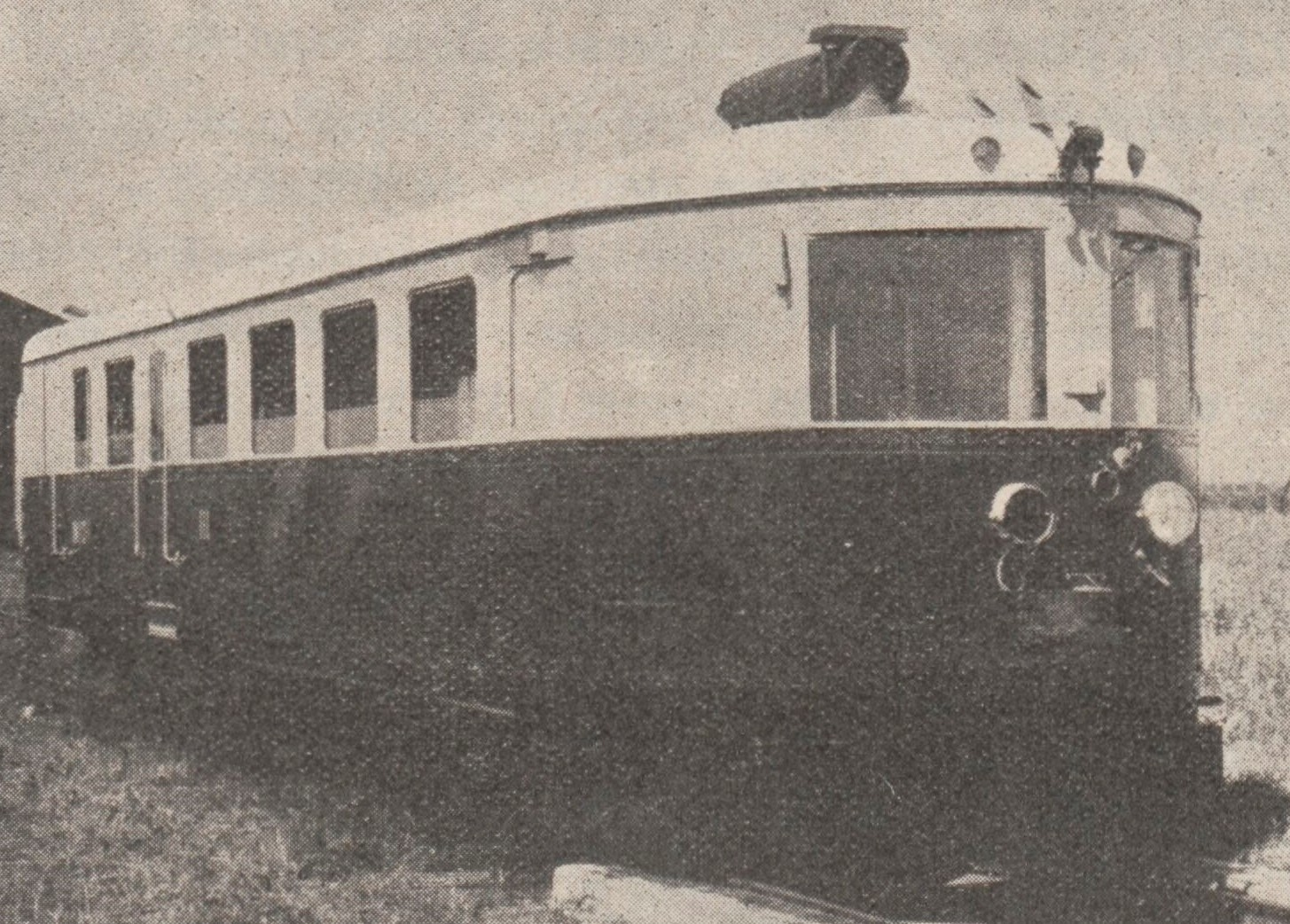
Pauline 2 bis du Midi.

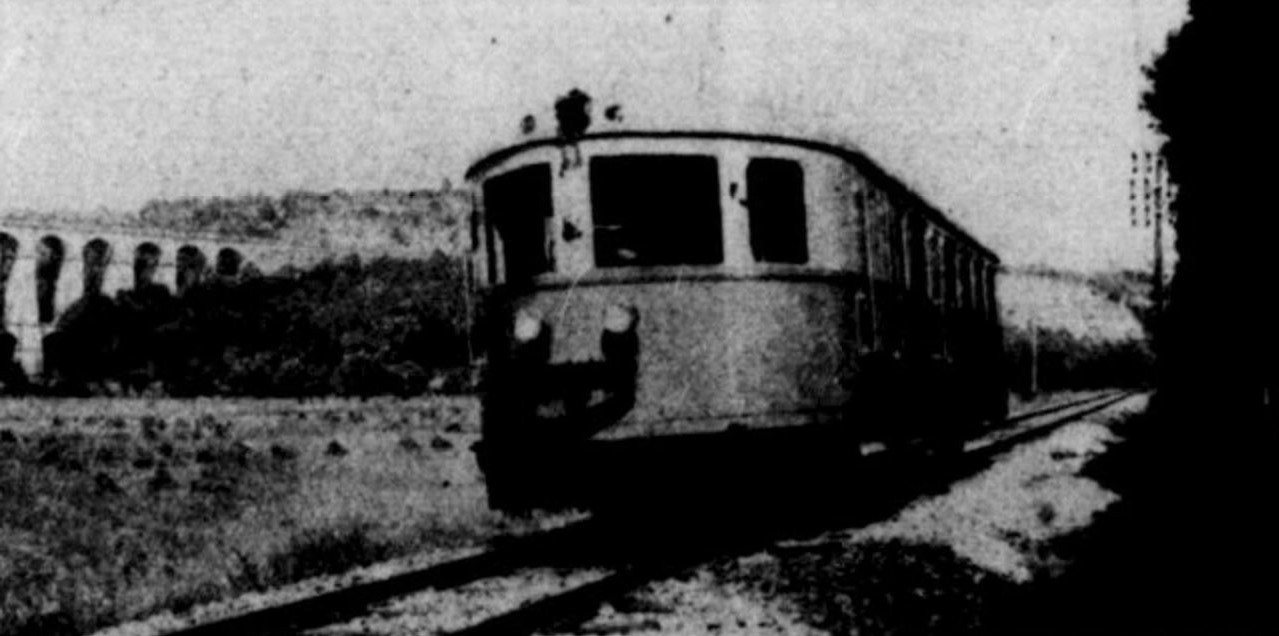
Pauline 2 or 2 bis on the Dijon-Ville line at Épinac in front of the Velars-sur-Ouche viaduct.

Le Midi, satisfied with the experience gained with its Pauline prototype, decided to order eight additional type 2 bis railcars, which were subsequently integrated into the PO-Midi workforce when the Midi and PO companies merged.

In all, nineteen Pauline 2 and 2 bis railcars were ordered by various French networks. Their purchase price varied between 450,000 and 460,000 francs, depending on the number of units purchased.

These railcars became part of the SNCF fleet when the company was created in 1938. They are registered in four tranches according to their type and original network: ZZC 11000, ZZC 11100, ZZC 11110, and ZZC 11200. In 1948, the letters XC replaced the ZZC code.

Distribution of Paulines type 2 orders by company.
Network	Workforce	Network registration	SNCF registration 1939	SNCF registration 1948
Alsace-Lorraine then PLM	1	ZZr 1 then in 1937 ZZC F 103	ZZC 11113	
PLM	2	ZZC F 101 and 102	ZZC 11111 and 11112	XC 11111 and 11112

Distribution of Paulines type 2 bis orders by company.
Network	Workforce	Network registration	SNCF registration 1939	SNCF registration 1948
Chemins de fer de l'État	4	ZZ 24007, 24008, 24011, 24012 then ZZ 24301 to 24304	ZZC 11201 to 11204	XC 11201 to 11204
PLM	4	ZZC 70 F 1 to 4 then ZZC F 1 to 4	ZZC 11101 to 11104	XC 11101 to 11104
Midi then PO-Midi	8	ZZtj 23601 to 23608 then ZZEt 23601 to 23608	ZZC 11001 to 11008	XC 11001 to 11008

=== Description and features ===
Paulines types 2 and 2 bis - the former being test prototypes of the latter, ordered by the AL and PLMA - differ from the later Paulines type 1 N in three respects in particular: running, motorization and fitting.

They were the first Paulines to feature profiled sides, a departure from the prototype, a shape subsequently adopted on other series. The body is 14.8 m long.

The body rests on four independent paired axles. Suspension is provided by leaf springs attached to the axleboxes and fitted with shock absorbers, as well as by suspension rods with rubber buffers connecting the body to the leaf springs.

The absence of a bogie means less comfort for passengers, but reduces weight by several tons. Two carriages, made up of light-alloy longitudinal members in which SKF rollerboxes rest, nevertheless form semblances of fixed bogies in relation to the body. Curves of up to 100 m radius are ensured by the large axial play of the two carrying axles. Wheels are 750 mm in diameter. Charlestop braking is provided by brake shoes whose linings rub on the drums mounted on the wheels. Four different hydraulic circuits brake the eight wheels, all controlled by a single hand lever.

The special architecture of the Paulines 2 and 2 bis running gear was reused in the late 1940s for the SNCF's U150 railcars (X 5500 and X 5800).

As with the Pauline type 1, traction is provided by a CLM type 85 LC 3 engine delivering 80 hp at 1,500 rpm. It's linked to a five-speed Minerva gearbox, including an overdrive ratio (1.24) enabling a top speed of around 90 km/h. Reversing the direction of travel is not performed by the gearbox, but by a helical toothed reverser inserted between the clutch flange on the flywheel and the gearbox. Two separate controls in the driver's cabs use a linkage to operate the gearbox and the shuttle. Finally, two cardan shafts at the gearbox output drive the inner axles of each carriage via drive axles with helical-toothed pinions.

In addition, the exhaust silencer is roof-mounted and the cooling radiators are located under the body at both ends of the machine. Highly vulnerable to impact, these radiators were moved to the roofs of machines still in SNCF inventories in 1945.

Six type 2 bis railcars (ZZC 11001, 11003, 11004, 11101, 11102 and 11103) were re-engined towards the end of the war with twelve-cylinder Hispano-Suiza type 68 petrols salvaged from Michelines type 16. They developed only half their rated 140 hp, due to the use of lean gas produced by a Panhard gasifier running on mineral coal. Deemed disappointing after tests carried out by EIC in 1946, these engines were finally replaced by the original CLM diesel engines.

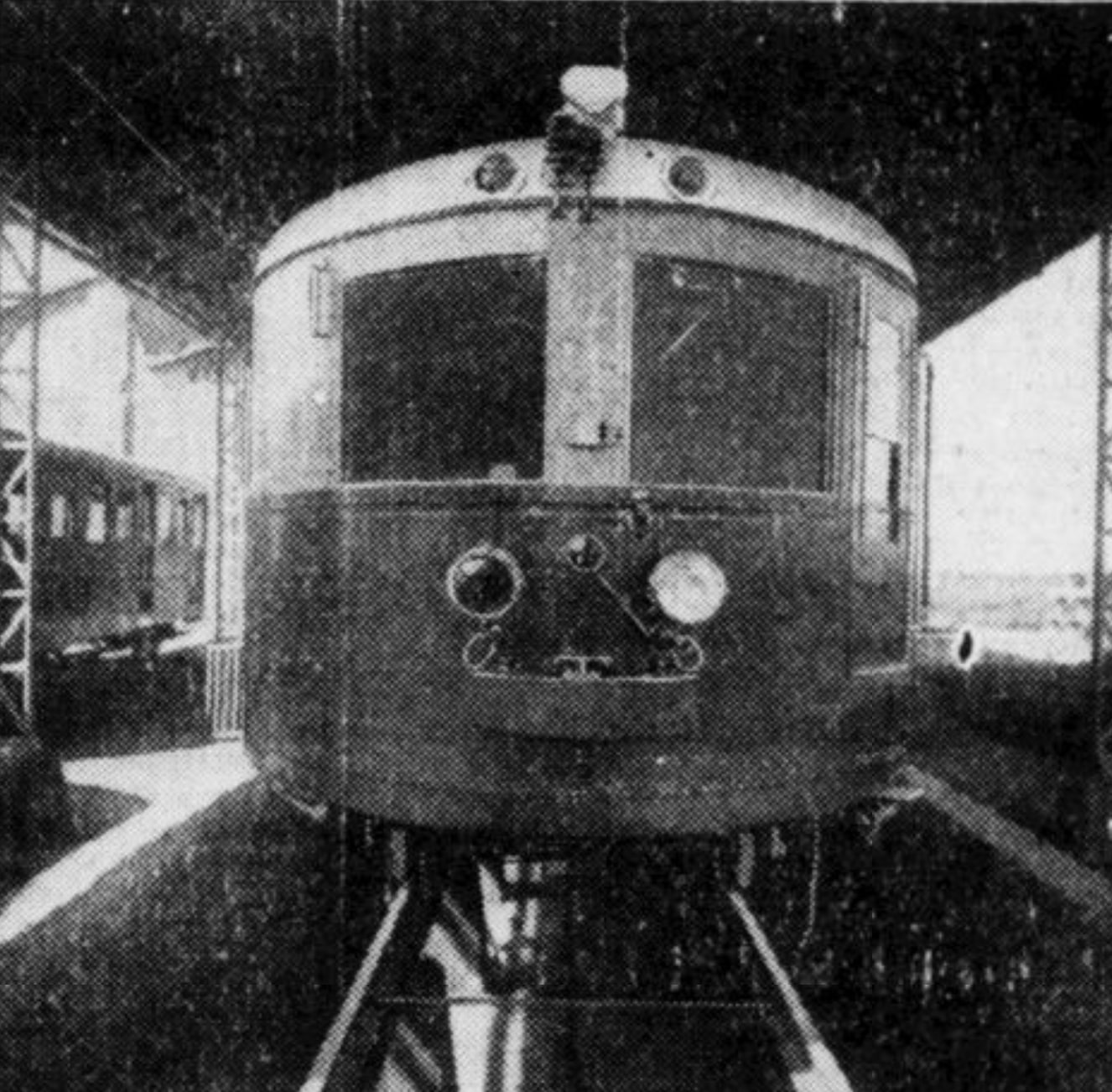
Front panel of a Pauline Midi.

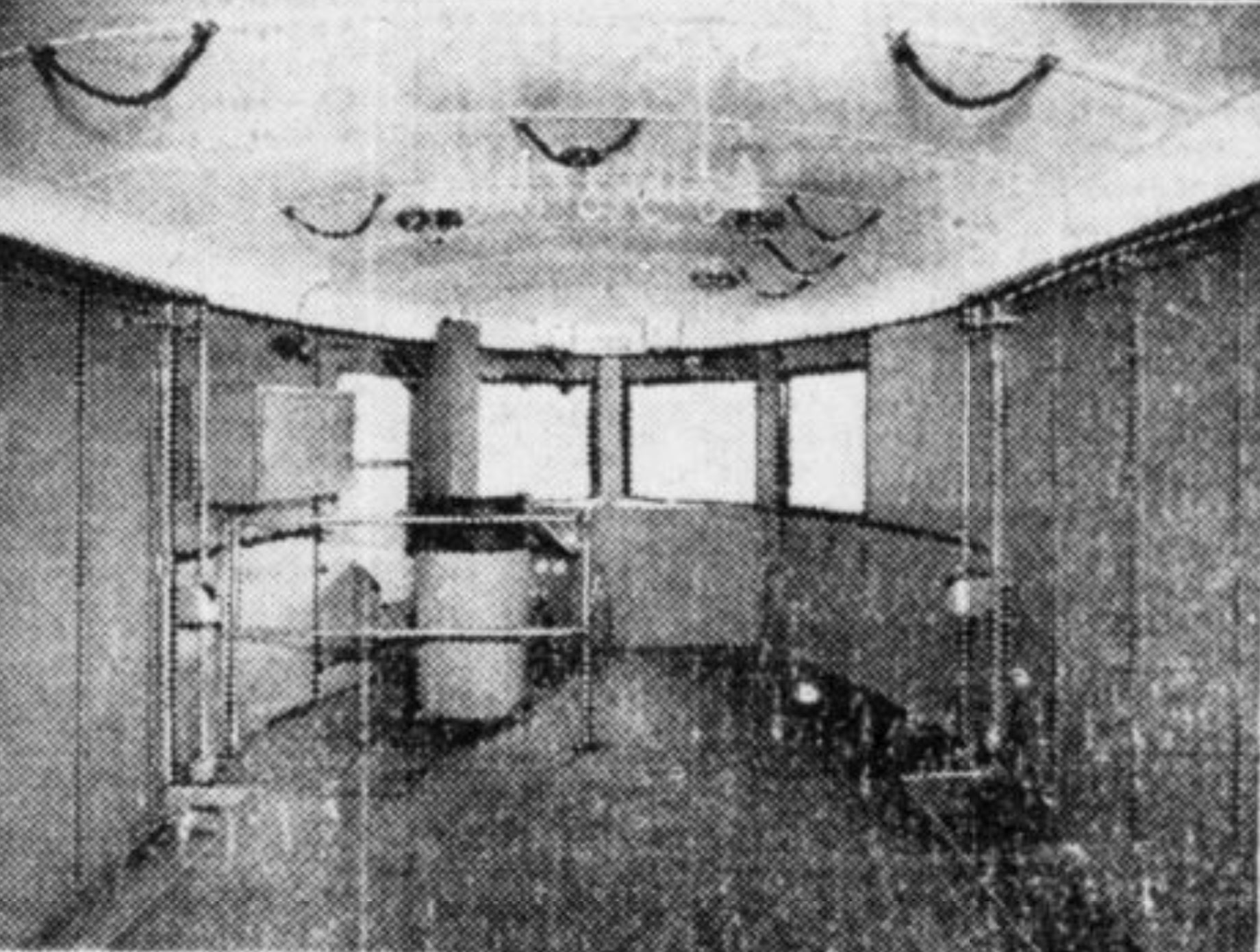
Pauline 2 bis driver's cab.

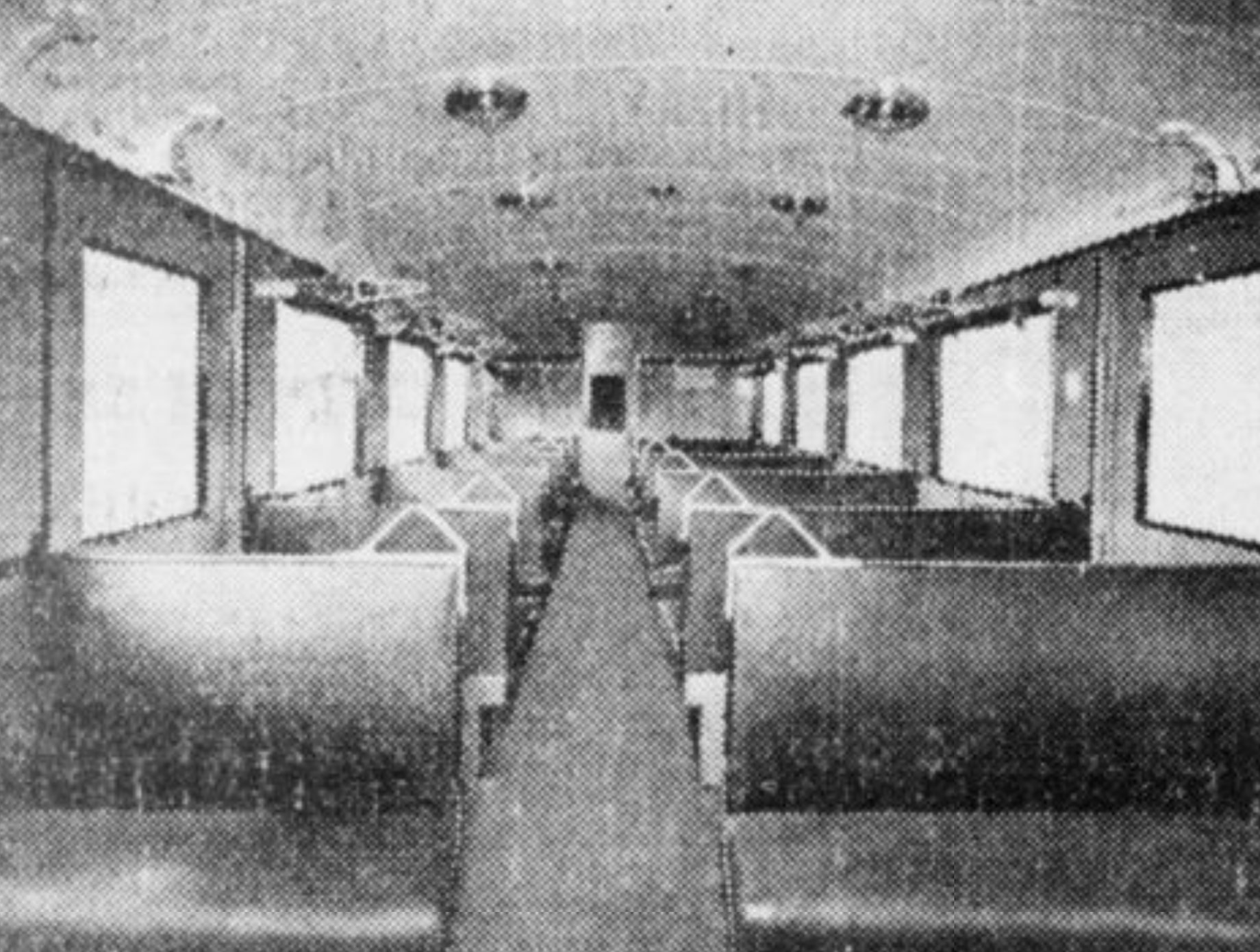
Interior design of a Pauline 2 bis.

The main difference between Paulines type 2 and 2 bis lies in their interior layout. Paulines type 2 offer sixty seats and a baggage compartment of around 6 m^{2}, while Paulines type 2 bis have fifty seats and a compartment of 9.5 m^{2}. The upholstered seats are covered in imitation leather, and folding seats are available in the luggage compartment in case of overcrowding. Despite a design in aluminum alloys, reputedly resistant to corrosion, the Paulines suffered from oxidation of certain parts. Extensive corrosion of the passenger compartment access doors, as well as the luggage compartment doors and floor, was discovered when a unit was sent back to the manufacturer in Aytré for repair after a collision with a steam locomotive. The corrosion was caused by the salt water flowing from the tidal packages frequently transported, and by the lime and calcium phosphate glue used to fix the wooden door panels, although it is particularly aggressive to metals. The repairs carried out by EIC consisted in removing the wooden door panels and waterproofing the van floor with pitch.

Pauline type 2 railcar liveries from former companies.

AL network railcar in livery.

Railcar in PLM livery.
Pauline type 2 bis railcars from former companies.

State network railcar in livery.

Railcar in PLM livery.

Compagnie du Midi railcar in livery.

Motorcar in PO-Midi livery.

The single Pauline AL adopts the same livery as the Renault and De Dietrich railcars of the network29, namely emerald green for the underbody and dove gray for the upper body and roof. (Note: A Journal journalist describes the livery of the De Dietrich railcar as follows: “green and light bistre separated by a daffodil border.)

PLM's Paulines are painted in the same livery as the company's railcars, with sky-blue underbody and gray upper body.

State railcars feature a ruby-red livery, complemented by green skirts and a white roof. A later two-tone ruby-red and pearl-gray livery also exists, forerunner of the first unified SNCF railcar livery.

Paulines du Midi are painted in a livery inspired by that of the Toulouse tramways, itself derived from the livery of Société des transports en commun de la région parisienne equipment: dark green lower body, cream upper body and white roof. The lettering is yellow.

Finally, the Paulines of the PO-Midi have a deep blue lower body and gray upper body with a white roof.

=== Services performed ===
==== Alsace-Lorraine ====
As early as October 1933, the AL considered the possibility of operating the section between Sainte-Marie-aux-Mines and Sélestat on the Sélestat to Lesseux - Frapelle line with railcars. The administration is considering Renault, Lorraine-Dietrich, Charentaise or Bugatti47 railcars for this service.

The only Pauline delivered to the AL was assigned to the Strasbourg depot. It alternates with a Renault VH on services to Niederbronn via Haguenau and to Sélestat via Molsheim. It was sold back to PLM on September 6, 1937.

==== État ====
The Paulines de l'État are assigned to the Alençon rail center and run omnibus services on the Mortagne-sur-Sèvre star.: For the 1936-1937 winter service, they run the following three-day shifts

- from Le Mans to L'Aigle via Alençon, Mamers, Mortagne and La Hutte - Coulombiers;
- from L'Aigle to Nogent-le-Rotrou via Mortagne and Condé-sur-Huisne;
- from Nogent-le-Rotrou to La Hutte - Coulombiers via Mortagne and Alençon, then from Surdon to Le Mans via Alençon.

==== PLM ====
Les Paulines du PLM are managed by the Alès autorails center. As soon as they arrived in 1933, they were put in charge of omnibus services between Alès and Montpellier via Quissac and Sommières, and to Saint-Jean-du-Gard. From 1934, they also operated services to La Levade. Finally, from 1936, they operated services between Alès and Nîmes and between Montpellier and Tarascon via Nîmes

Thanks to the methodical upkeep and maintenance carried out and praised by the PLM company, only one breakdown affected the railcars at the Alès center during the first six months of 1936.

==== Midi then PO-Midi ====
The Paulines du Midi are grouped together at the Mont-de-Marsan rail center, and serve the star around the town in rotation with the Pauline type 1 and the four Paulines type 1 N. These railcars provide services from Mont-de-Marsan to Marmande, Dax, Nérac and Morcenx on the one hand, and omnibus services between Saint-Sever and Hagetmau and between Marmande and Eymet on the other.

==== SNCF ====
Due to the drop in traffic on the Mortagne and Mont-de-Marsan stars in 1939 - some rail connections were transferred to road and some lines were gradually closed - and the lack of fuel, twelve Paulines 2 and 2 bis were grouped together in the West region at the Versailles-Matelots depot. These were ZZC 11001 to 11008 ex-PO-Midi, ZZC 11201 to 11203 ex-État and ZZC 11113 ex-PLM. ZZC 11204 is assigned to Le Mans.

Some units receive the unified SNCF railcar livery (ruby red and pearl grey, later vermilion red and cream), while other railcars retain their original livery until they are written off.

Pauline railcars delivered to SNCF.

Railcar in ruby red and pearl gray livery.

XC 11006 demotorized in red and cream livery.

At the end of the war, only Paulines types 2 and 2 bis and Paulines 1 N returned to service, with the exception of ZZC units 11113, 11202 and 11204, which had been reformed. Railcars ZZC 11002, 11005, 11006, 11007, 11008 (ex-PO-Midi) and 11203 (ex-État) are assigned to the West region, and ZZCs 11111, 11112, 11103 and 11104 (ex-PLM) to the South-East.

All remaining railcars were finally grouped together at the Laroche-Migennes depot from 1949 for services to Avallon and Clamecy via Auxerre, and to Troyes. However, the SNCF's Division des études d'autorails (DEA) noted that Charlestop brake systems were difficult to maintain, despite their limited efficiency, and criticized CLM engines for their complexity and fragility, requiring more frequent maintenance than Renault or Saurer engines of the period. The reform of the Paulines ended in 1952.

The XC 11006 was spared reinforcement for a time, as it was used as a companion railcar for the Castan no. 2 mobile probing device, used to probe and measure tunnels during inspection. After a career lasting some twenty years, this last example of the series was finally destroyed in 1979 at the Château-du-Loir depot.

== Type 3 N ==
=== Controls ===
Pauline type 3 N
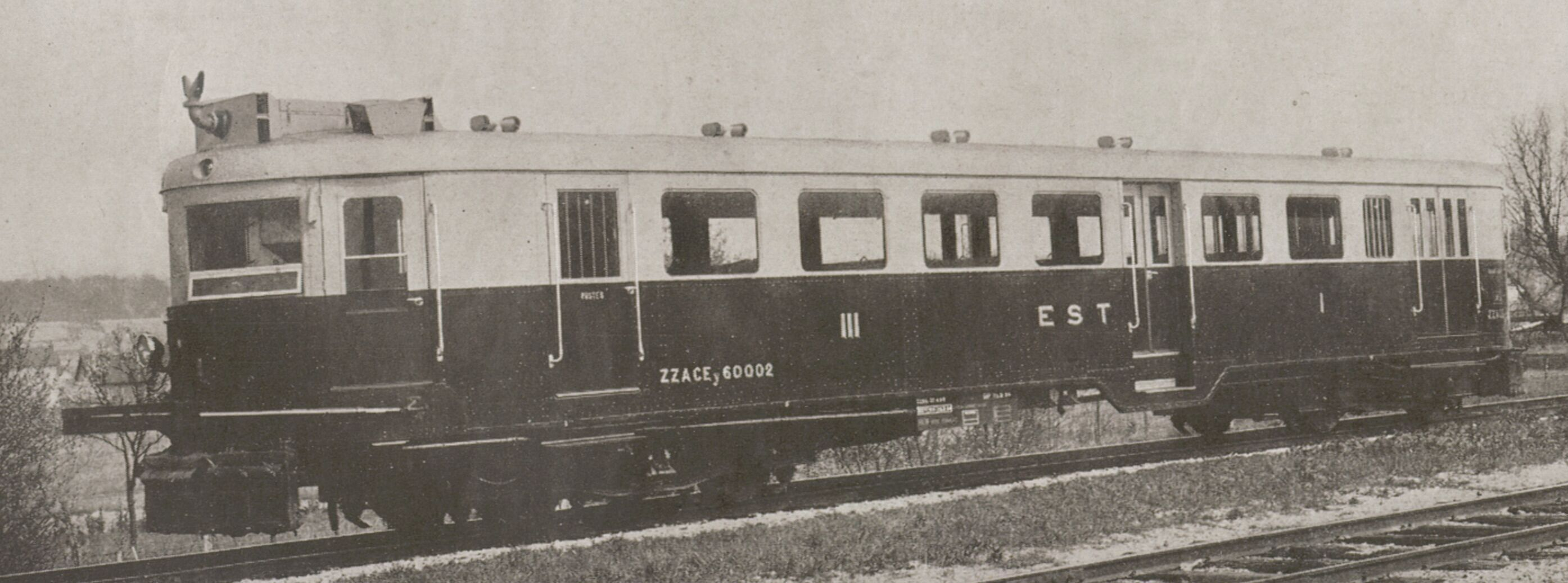
- Stock type: ZZ 60001 and 60002 (East) ZZC 1001 and 1002 (SNCF)
- In service: 1934
- Constructed: 1934
- Entered service: 1934
- Operator: East then SNCF

Specifications
- Car length: 18.064 metres (59.27 ft)
- Axle load: 1,435 mm
- Traction motors: 1 diesel engine and gasifier (ZZ 60002)
- Power output: 120 hp at 1,100 rpm

Only the compagnie de l'Est placed an order with EIC for two Charentaise type 3 N railcars. They were delivered to the company in 1934, at a price of 590,000 francs each.

They were numbered ZZACE 60001 and 60002, then given the SNCF registrations ZZC 1001 and 1002.

Both railcars were féraillés in 1940, whereas ZZC 1002 had been badly damaged in 1939 by a fire in the baggage compartment caused by its gasifierLT 3,.

=== Description and features ===
Charentaises type 3 N are longer than Paulines types 2 and 2 bis, measuring 18.064 m in length. The body construction once again uses duralium.

These were the first Charentaise railcars to be built on two bogies. They are of simple design, made of stainless steel with nickel-chromium alloy. They have a wheelbase of 2.25 m and 850 mm wheels in Timken roller boxes.

Braking once again uses the Charlestop system.

The railcar is equipped with two driver's cabs, as well as a separate room for a mobile PTTAdF 20 agent. It also has a large 10 m2 luggage compartment with a load capacity of 1,500 kg. On the other hand, the 3 N railcars are the only Charentaises not to be equipped with toilets.

Power is provided by a German MAN engine manufactured under license by Société Générale de Constructions Mécaniques (SGCM). This is a six-cylinder in-line diesel engine, delivering 120 hp at 1,100 rpm and a maximum output of 150 hp. It weighs almost twice as much as the CLM 85 LC 3 engines used on previous series.

The motor is coupled to a Minerva gearbox, similar to that used on Type 1 Nrailcars. The five-speed gearbox is connected upstream to the clutch by a two-piece shaft, and transmits power to the motor bogie via a transmission and cardan shaft.

In 1936, the Compagnie de l'Est, inspired by the trials carried out by the State network on its SOMUA or De Dietrich railcars, decided to equip the Charentaise ZZ 60002 with a gasifier. The original MAN engine - modified by SGCM to run on lean gas - is retained. The heavy oil tanks are replaced by a charcoal gasifier. This charcoal is produced in a special furnace from old reformed sleepers. Impregnated with creosote, these sleepers give the charcoal a high calorific value, resulting in a power output 5% higher than that of diesel.

An engine cooling radiator is mounted under the body at each end. The machines have no end buffers or hitches, but are fitted with hooks for towing in the event of breakdown, and bumper bars braced by two lateral spring-loaded shock absorbers.

=== Services performed ===
The two Charentaises 3 N from the East are assigned to the Langres depot. They provide star connections around the town to Chaumont, Merrey and Is-sur-Tille. In summer, they operate between Vitrey-Vernois and Bourbonne-les-Bains, replacing Michelines. Finally, they operate between Dijon-Ville and Langres.

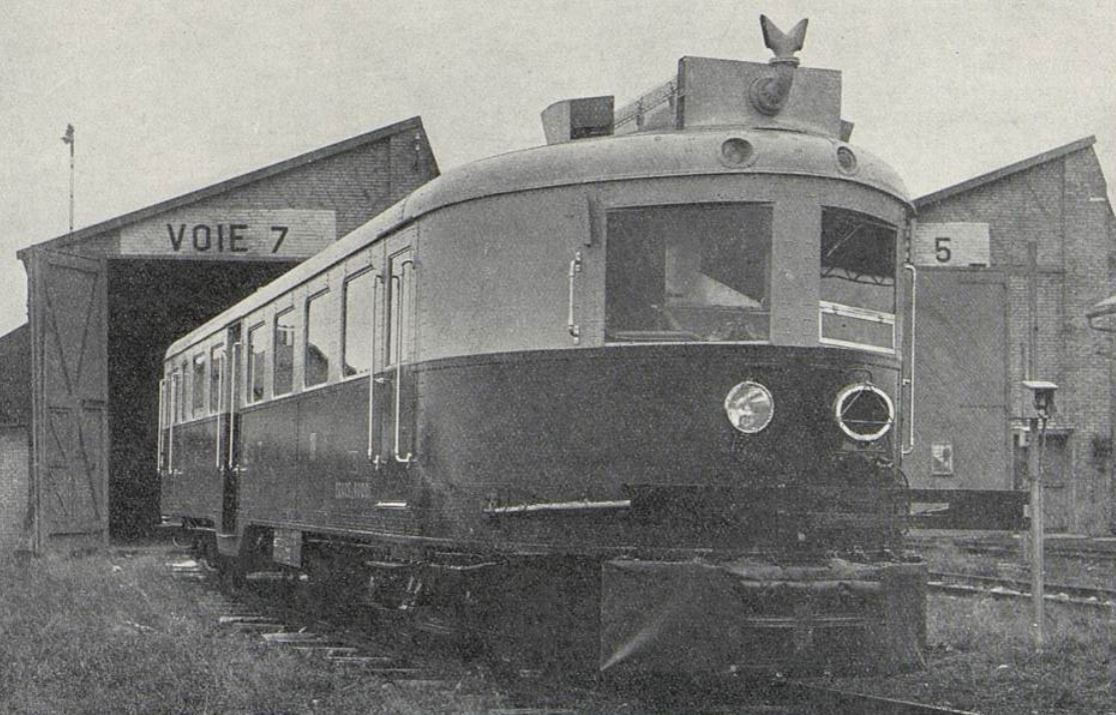
Pauline 3 N in Aytré.

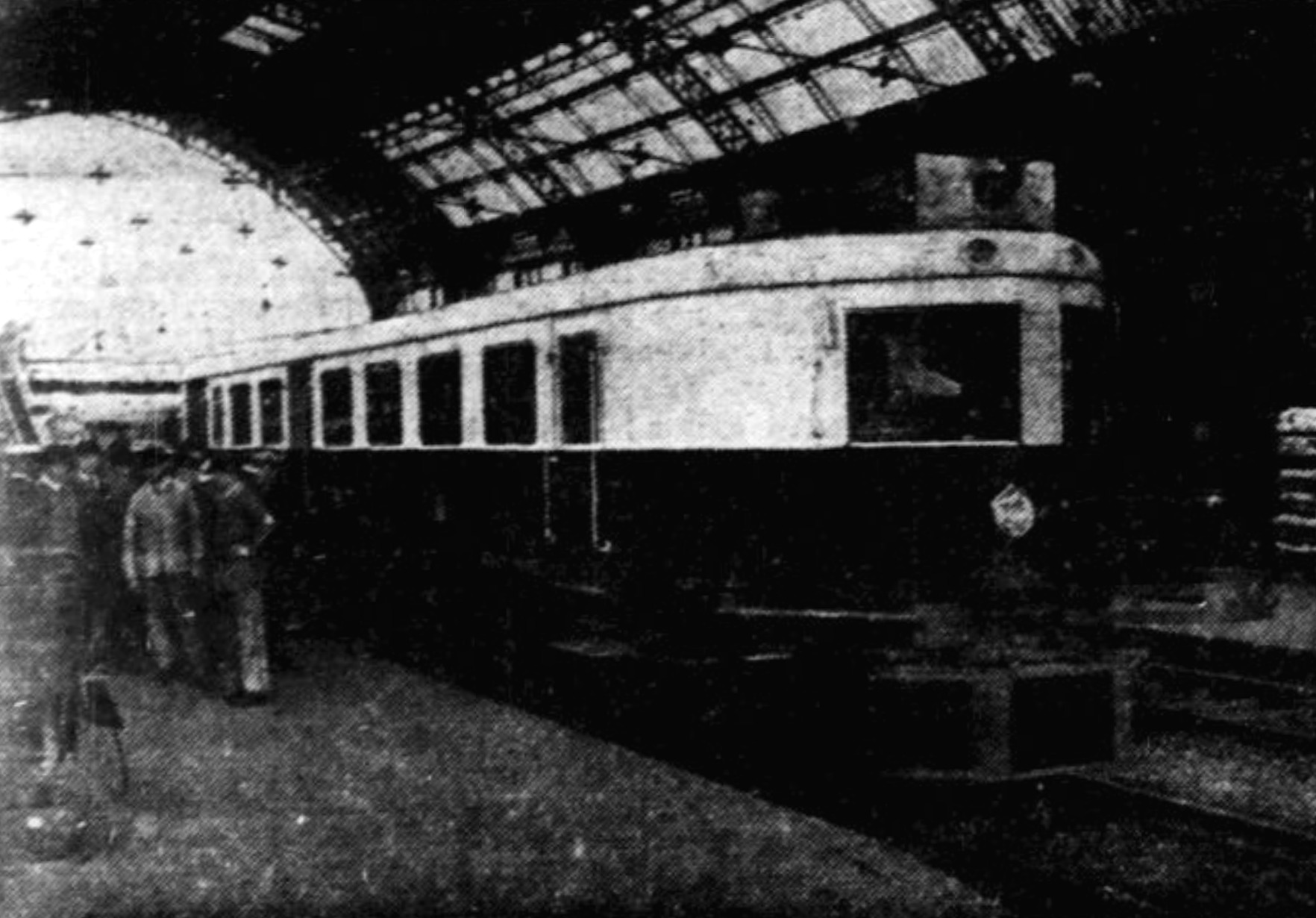
Pauline 3 N at Dijon station providing service to Langres

In 1937, the State network and the Compagnie de l'Est set up a traveling exhibition on board several railcars to present the economic interests of French forests and their achievements in exploiting these resources; photographs of the gas-powered ZZ 60002 were part of this exhibition, which took in Verdun, Bar-le-Duc and Épinal. In 1938, the ZZ 60002 was transported to Bordeaux for the Exposition des carburants forestiers. For the occasion, the journey between Juvisy and Bordeaux was made at an average speed of 80 km/h and a top speed of 100 km/h, consuming an average of 50 kg of coal per 100 km.

== Type 4 N ==
=== Controls ===
Pauline type 4 N
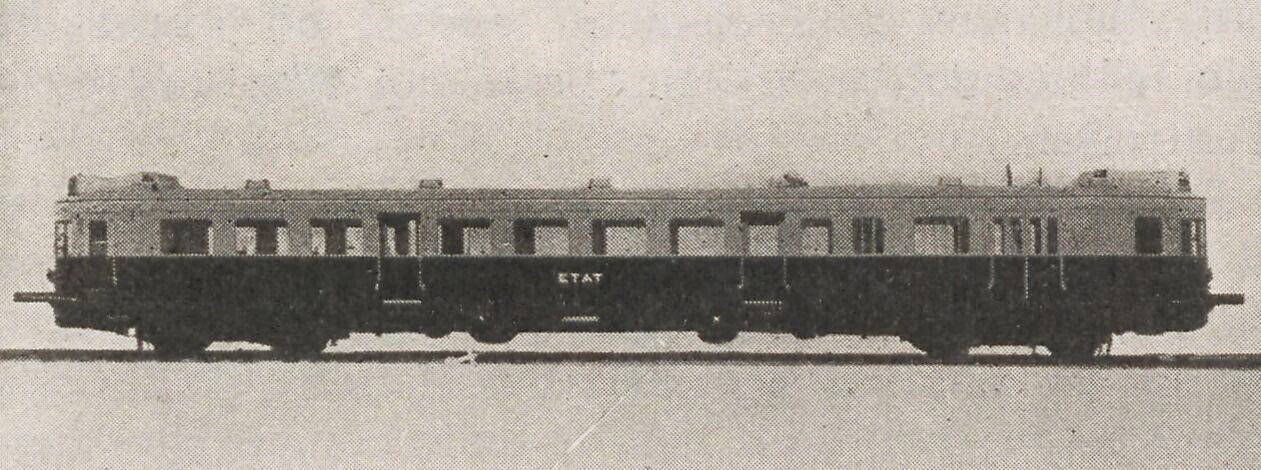
- Pauline type 4 N from the State.
- Stock type: ZZy 24311 à 24314 (État) ZZC 1101 à 1104 (SNCF)
- In service: 1935
- Manufacturer: Entreprises industrielles charentaises
- Constructed: 1935
- Capacity: 75 seats
- Operator: État then SNCF

Specifications
- Car length: 23.07 metres (75.7 ft)
- Maximum speed: 115 km/h
- Weight: 31.6 t
- Power output: 280 ch at 1,500 tr/min

In 1933, the Board of Directors of the State network, which already owned four Paulines type 2 bis, decided to further expand its fleet of railcars, while continuing to compare the various manufacturers (including Renault, Bugatti and Michelin). The network orders two new Charentaise railcars from EIC. Called type 4 N, they are the longest railcars in the range.

Two further railcars of the same type were ordered in 1934, bringing the total fleet to four units. The first units were purchased for 815,000 francs each, the last two for 795,000 francs. The four railcars were delivered and put into service between 1935 and 1937.

At the State, the four railcars are numbered ZZy 24311 to 24314, then the SNCF assigns them registrations ZZC 1101 to 1104.

=== Description and features ===
The Charentaises type 4 N are based on the main design features of previous railcars in the range: the duralium body is mounted on two two-axle bogies, and the railcar is reversible.

They have a length excluding buffers of 23.07 m and a total weight of 31.6 t unladen and 40.5 t laden.

The luggage compartment, with an authorized load of 1,500 kg and a surface area of 11 m^{2}, houses a space reserved for a PTT travelling agent, and the toilets. Separated from this compartment by a partition, a passenger access platform leads to a first compartment with fortyseats. A second access platform leads to another compartment with thirty seats. All in all, and counting the places available in the van and on the platforms in case of overcrowding, the railcar offers a capacity of seventy-five seats, thirteen folding seats and twenty-five standing places.

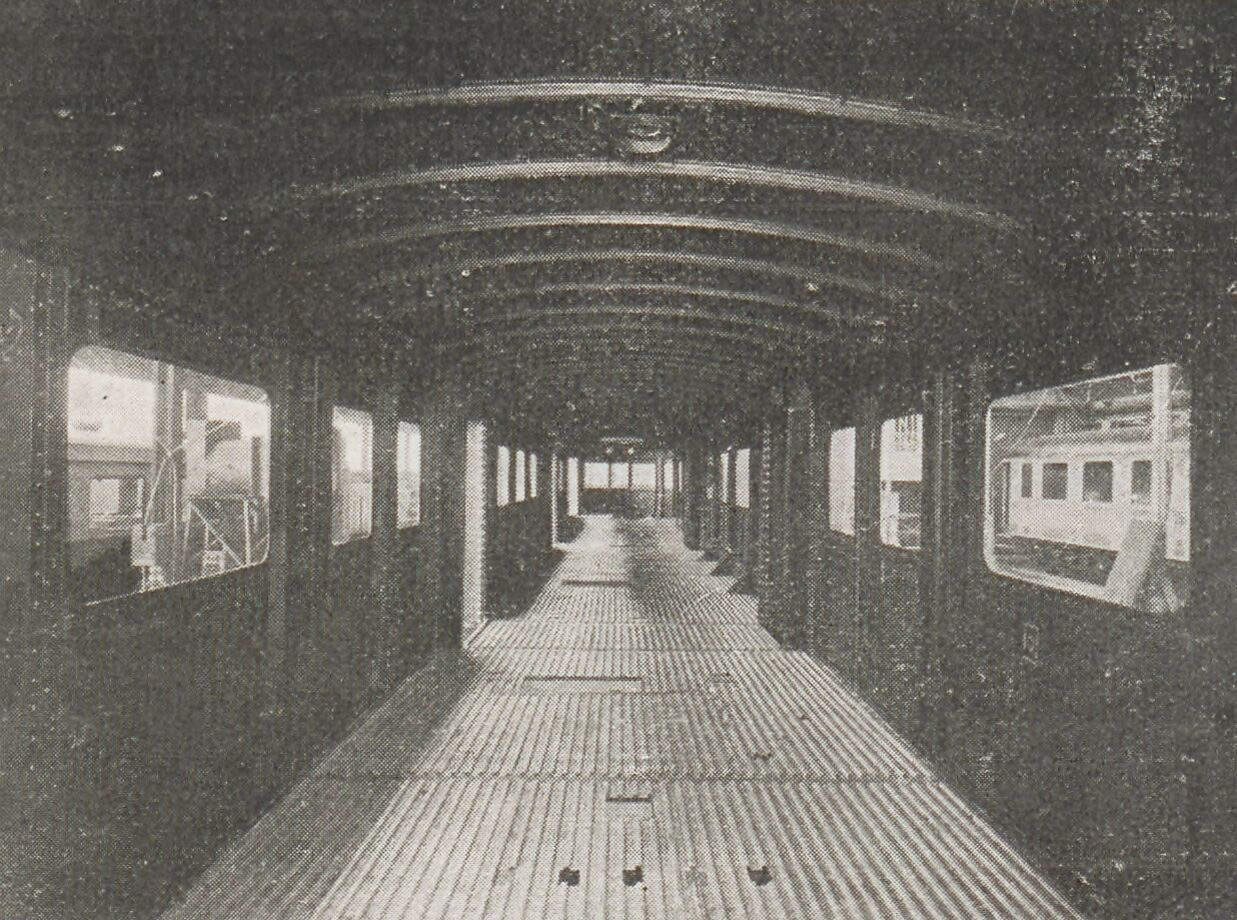
Body structure.

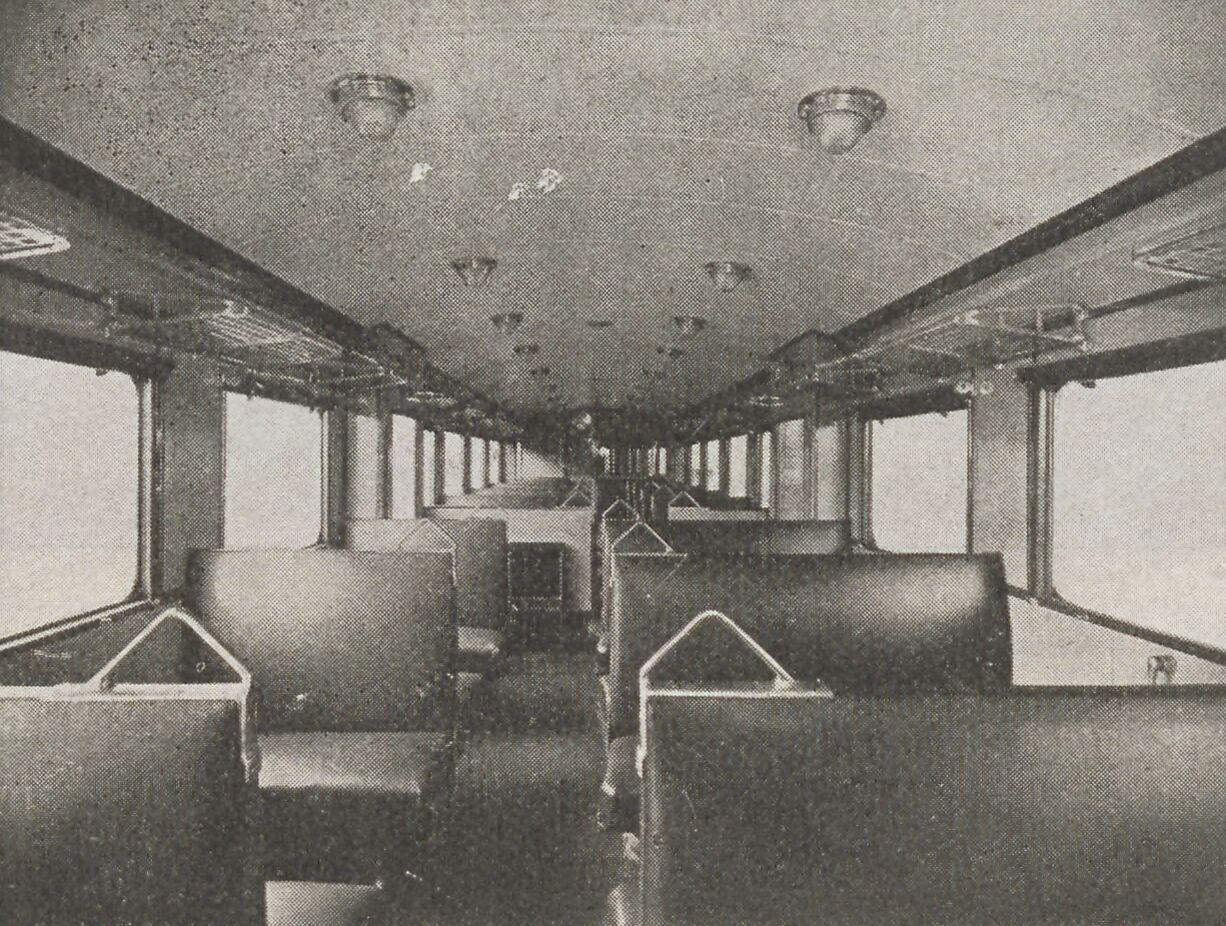
Aménagement intérieur.

For the powerplant, EIC selected two independent units, each comprising a Saurer BXD in-line six-cylinder engine delivering 140 hp at 1,500 rpm. The engines are arranged at each end of the railcar, delivering a total output of 280 hp for a maximum operating speed of 115 km/h.

These motors are each coupled to a Minerva six-speed gearbox, pneumatically and mechanically controlled, linked to the inner axles of each bogie by a Glaenzer cardan drive shaft. Cooling radiators are located on the roof. The railcar is fitted with Messier brakes, which, like the Charlestop brake, are hydraulic.

All four railcars are painted in the state railcar livery, ruby red for the underbody and pearl gray for the top.

=== Services performed ===
The four Charentaises are assigned to their delivery at the Niort depot. In service, they run omnibus services between Château-du-Loir and Bordeaux-Saint-Jean, via Saintes.

During the World War II, the railcars were stationed in the Paris region at Versailles-Matelots and Montrouge.

In 1946, they were demotorized and transformed into railcar trailers at the Rennes workshops. These trailers are registered XR 4131 to 4134. During these operations, the original bogies are replaced by carrier bogies recovered from war-damaged Renault ABVs, with the same wheelbase as the previous ones. The trailers were also fitted with bumper crossbars, enabling them to be coupled to VH, ABJ or ADP trains.

Lightened by their engines, the trailers weigh between 22 and 23 t empty. Seating capacity was increased to 88 third-class seats, while baggage space was reduced to 7 m^{2}, with the PTT compartment eliminated. Heating is provided by an independent boiler. Maximum operating speed increased to 90 km/h.

The trailers, assigned to the SNCF's Western region, are used for services around Rennes. In 1960, a unit is presented by the SNCF in Strasbourg as part of an exhibition organized by the Centre international de développement de l'aluminium, promoting the use of light alloys in railway construction. The Charentaise trailer is exhibited alongside a État double-decker and a Saucisson car, both built by EIC. All four trailers were reformed before 1962.

== Preservation ==
No examples of the first French diesel-powered railcars have survived.

A Pauline 2 bis body of unknown origin and registration was used in the 1950s to house a restaurant near the Saint-Même circus in Saint-Pierre-d'Entremont. The railcar has been repainted white. The fate of this body is unknown, but it no longer exists.

The presence of XC 11006 at the Château-du-Loir depot was reported by Luc Fournier - in charge of technical heritage at the French Ministry of Culture - to the Musée français du Chemin de fer in Mulhouse, with a view to its preservation, but to no avail, as the railcar was destroyed in 1979.

== Modelling ==
The Pauline type 1 was reproduced in HO in a static version by Editions Atlas as part of the Michelines et autorails collection.

The XC 11000 was reproduced in HO by the craftsman Interfer in kit form, and its static reproduction was also included in the Michelines et autorails collection. The complete railcar was published in two parts in Loco Revue in 1988.

== See also ==
- Railcar
- Micheline (railcar)

== Bibliography ==
- Broncard, Yves (2007). Autorails de France. Les Éditions La Vie du rail. ISBN 978-2-915034-68-4.
- Constant, Olivier (2023). "SOMUA - Berliet - Lorraine - Charentaises, Betschdorf, Le Train". Les Archives Autorails. ISSN 1296-5537.
