= Micheline (railcar) =

Rubber-tyred trains developed in France in the 1930s

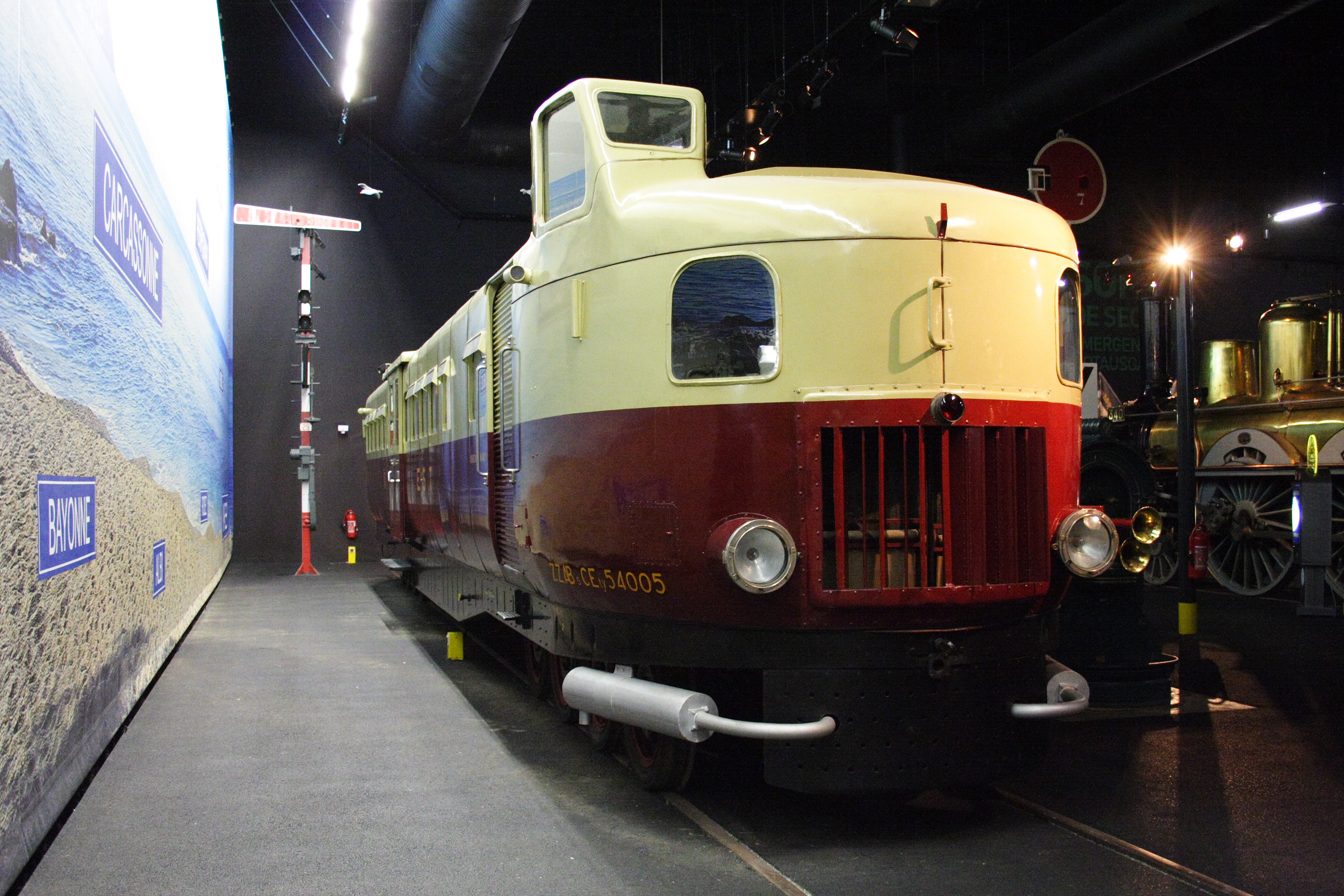
Micheline train at the Cité du train museum in Mulhouse, France

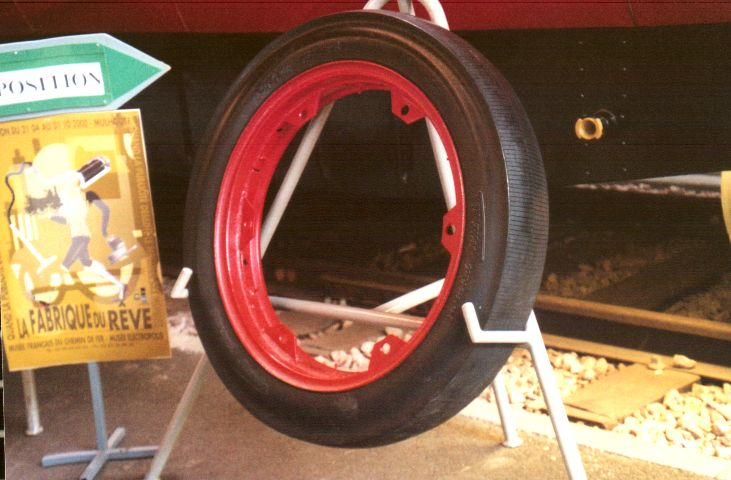
Micheline tyre and rim

Michelines were a series of rubber-tyred trains developed in France in the 1930s by various rail companies and rubber-tyre manufacturer Michelin. Some Michelines were built in the United States by the Budd Company.

Most Michelines were self-propelled, but a number of locomotive-hauled trainsets were also produced.

Michelines offered unprecedented ride smoothness, but they soon proved to be problematic because the low load that the wheels could bear limited railcar sizes and demanded a high number of tyres (up to 20) per car. Furthermore, they were subject to flat tyres, unlike cars with steel wheels.

Eventually, the Michelines gave way to rubber-tyred metros, pioneered by the RATP (Paris transit authority) which introduced them for their superior acceleration characteristics, in order to increase the capacity of their subway lines.

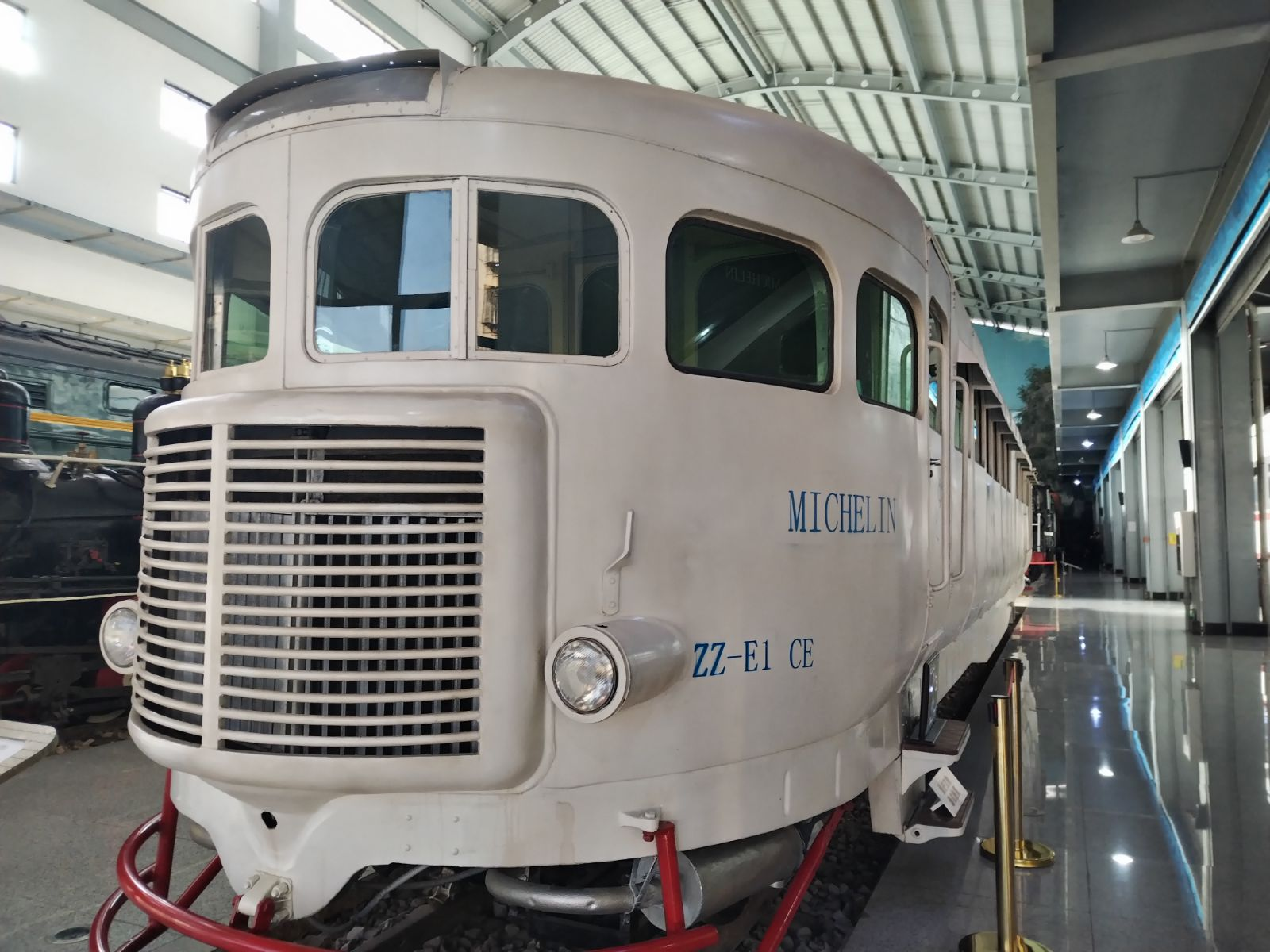
Michelin Railcar type 52 No. ZZ-E1 CE at Yunnan Railway Museum

However, as time went by, the extra complexity of rubber-tyred rolling stock meant that they were superseded by conventional steel-wheel rolling stock.

== See also ==
- Pauline (railcar)
