= Budd–Michelin rubber-tired rail cars =

Rubber-tired rail cars

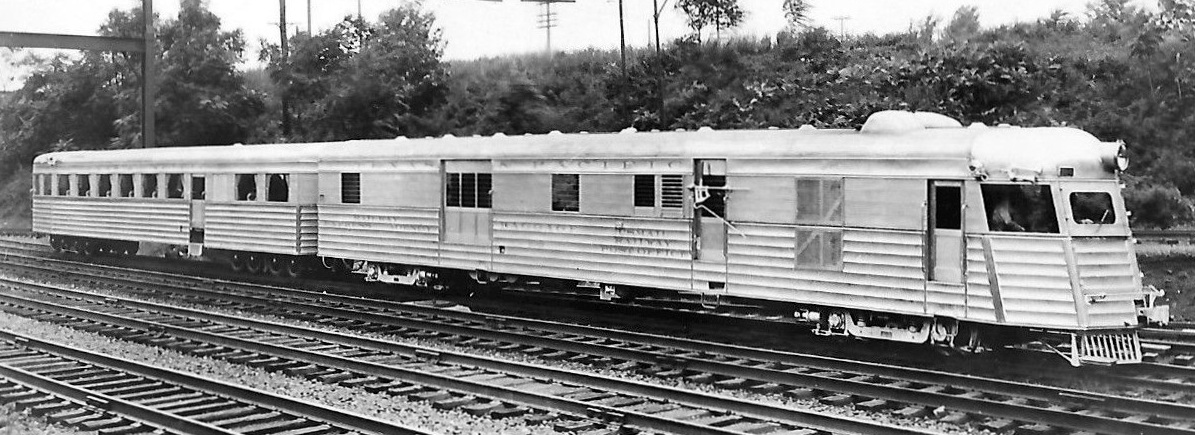
Budd's fluted stainless-steel, rubber-tired railcar, the Silver Slipper, in 1933; it is sometimes credited as the first streamlined passenger train

The Budd–Michelin rubber-tired rail cars were built by the Budd Company in the United States between 1931 and 1933 using French firm Michelin's "Micheline" rail car design. Michelin built its first rail car in 1929, and by 1932 had built a fleet of nine cars that all featured innovative and distinctive pneumatic tires. In September 1931, an agreement signed between the two companies allowed Budd to use the new rubber rail tires on its shot-welded, stainless-steel carbodies, and at the same time allowed Michelin to expand into the American market.

After building two demonstrators in what would become its signature semi-streamlined, fluted stainless-steel style, the Budd Company built four production rubber-tired rail cars for American railroads: one for the Reading Company, two for the Pennsylvania Railroad, and the Silver Slipper for the Texas and Pacific Railway. All were plagued by problems, chief among them their tendency to derail. By 1935, the Silver Slipper had been scrapped, and the Pennsylvania's two cars, the longest surviving of the Budd–Michelin collaborations, met the same fate in 1948.

While generally regarded as a failure, the Silver Slipper is sometimes credited as the "first true streamlined passenger train", although it has remained obscure in comparison with other competitors for the title, such as the Pioneer Zephyr and Union Pacific's M-10000. Rubber-tired rail cars achieved greater success in France, and similar rubber-tired subway cars have been adopted in Canada, Mexico, and on numerous systems in Europe.

== Design ==
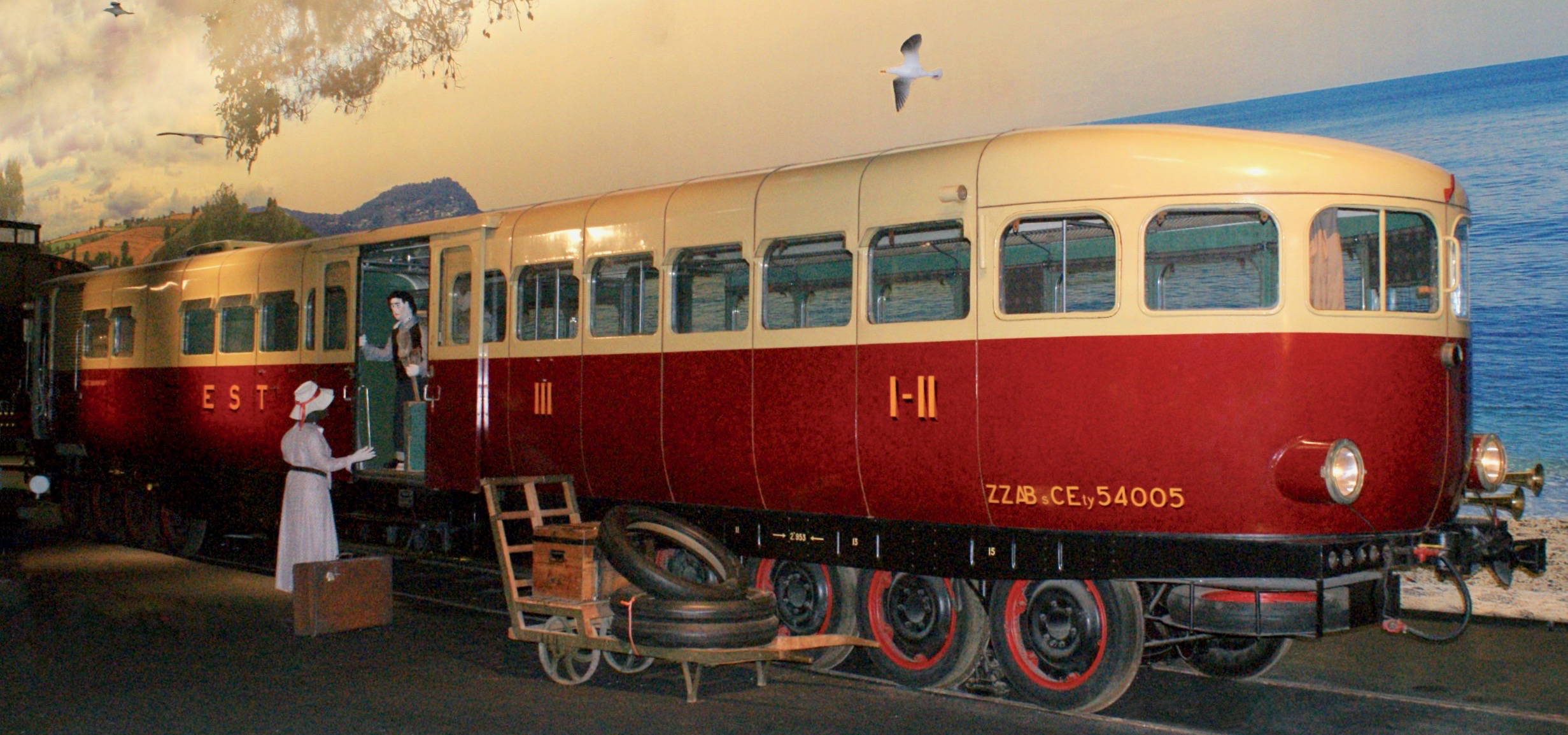
A Micheline Type 22 railcar at Cité du Train in Mulhouse

During the 1920s, the American Budd Company, at the time a relatively obscure auto-frame supplier, developed an extensive working relationship with the French firm Michelin, which was best known for its tires. In 1929, Michelin built its first rail car, and by 1932 nine of its cars were in operating service, all of which featured innovative and distinctive pneumatic tires. The company claimed that its application of tires on its rail cars afforded both a substantially more cushioned ride and increased the cars' traction by 35%. The design of Michelin's tired wheels included an aluminum safety ring and a flange that were only used in the event of a puncture or other type of tire failure; during normal operation, only the rubber tire made contact with the rail.

Inspired by Michelin's success, the Budd Company set its sights on marrying the new rubber rail tires with its shot-welded, stainless-steel carbodies; it had developed the shot welding process and utilized stainless steel to overcome frame failures that plagued the earlier streamlined McKeen cars, which Budd Company founder Edward G. Budd had helped design early in his career. Michelin likewise took interest in a potential collaboration, chiefly due to its desire to expand into the American market. In September 1931, Budd signed an agreement with Michelin that allowed it to develop and sell Michelin's "Micheline" rail car design in the United States.

== Demonstrators ==
Completed in early 1932, the first of the Budd–Michelin collaborations was a 40-passenger, single-car demonstrator nicknamed the "Green Goose", which rode on 12 wheels and was powered by an 85-horsepower (63 kW) Junker diesel engine. A second demonstrator, a smaller, 30-passenger car named La Fayette, was sent to France for testing. The two demonstrators were both built in the semi-streamlined, fluted stainless-steel style that would become the Budd Company's signature design.

== Production rail cars ==
The Budd Company built four production rubber-tired rail cars for American railroads: one for the Reading Company, two for the Pennsylvania Railroad, and the Silver Slipper for the Texas and Pacific Railway. The pneumatic tires for these cars were actually produced by Goodyear under license from Michelin. Beginning in November 1932, the Reading operated its 47-passenger car (which measured 50 ft or 15 m long and weighed 12 short tons or 11 t) on its New Hope branch. However, its numerous shortcomings, ranging from its bouncy ride and tendency to derail to its low top speed (reputed to be near 45 mph or 72 km/h) and steep price tag ($75,000), discouraged the Reading from ordering any more such cars.

In 1933, the Pennsylvania took delivery of two rail cars that operated in car-and-trailer configuration. Largely similar to the car ordered by the Reading, these rail cars were also beset by problems with their rubber-tired wheels, which were later replaced with conventional trucks. After being retrofitted, these cars went on to become the longest surviving of the Budd–Michelin rail cars. They remained with the Pennsylvania until 1943, when they were sold to the Washington and Old Dominion Railroad, a Virginia short line that operated them for only a few months; they were ultimately scrapped in 1948.

=== Silver Slipper ===
Silver Slipper
Type and origin
- Power type: Gasoline-electric
- Builder: Budd Company; Michelin
- Build date: 1933
- Total produced: 1
Specifications
- Gauge: 4 ft 8 1/2 in (1,435 mm) standard gauge
- Length: 140 feet (42.67 m)
- Loco weight: 52 short tons (46 long tons; 47 tonnes)
- Prime mover: Two American LaFrance gasoline engines
- Generator: Westinghouse generators
- Transmission: Electric
Career
- Operators: Texas and Pacific Railway
- Locale: United States
- Disposition: Scrapped

The Silver Slipper was the name bestowed upon the last of the Budd–Michelin rail cars, which was delivered to the Texas and Pacific Railway in October 1933. The two-car train weighted 52 short tons (46 long tons; 47 t) and measured 140 feet (42.7 m) in total length, making it the largest rail vehicle that the Budd Company had built to that point, and substantially heavier than the demonstration and production rubber-tired cars that preceded it.

The first car was the power car, which featured a distinctive "knife-edge" nose, baggage and mail compartments, and conventional steel-wheeled trucks. Powered by two 240-horsepower (180 kW) American LaFrance gasoline engines mated to Westinghouse generators, the lead car weighed 40 short tons (35.7 long tons; 36.3 t) in all. The second car was the trailing passenger car, which had 16 rubber-tired wheels as well as seating for 76 passengers in an air-conditioned compartment that included a segregated "Jim Crow" section. The second car weighed just 12 short tons (10.7 long tons; 10.9 t) in total.

The Texas and Pacific intended to enter the Silver Slipper into operational service between Fort Worth, Texas, and Texarkana, Arkansas. However, it derailed during a test run, and while the trailing coach was outfitted with new trucks, the power car also demonstrated reliability issues. By 1935, the Silver Slipper had been scrapped.

== Legacy ==
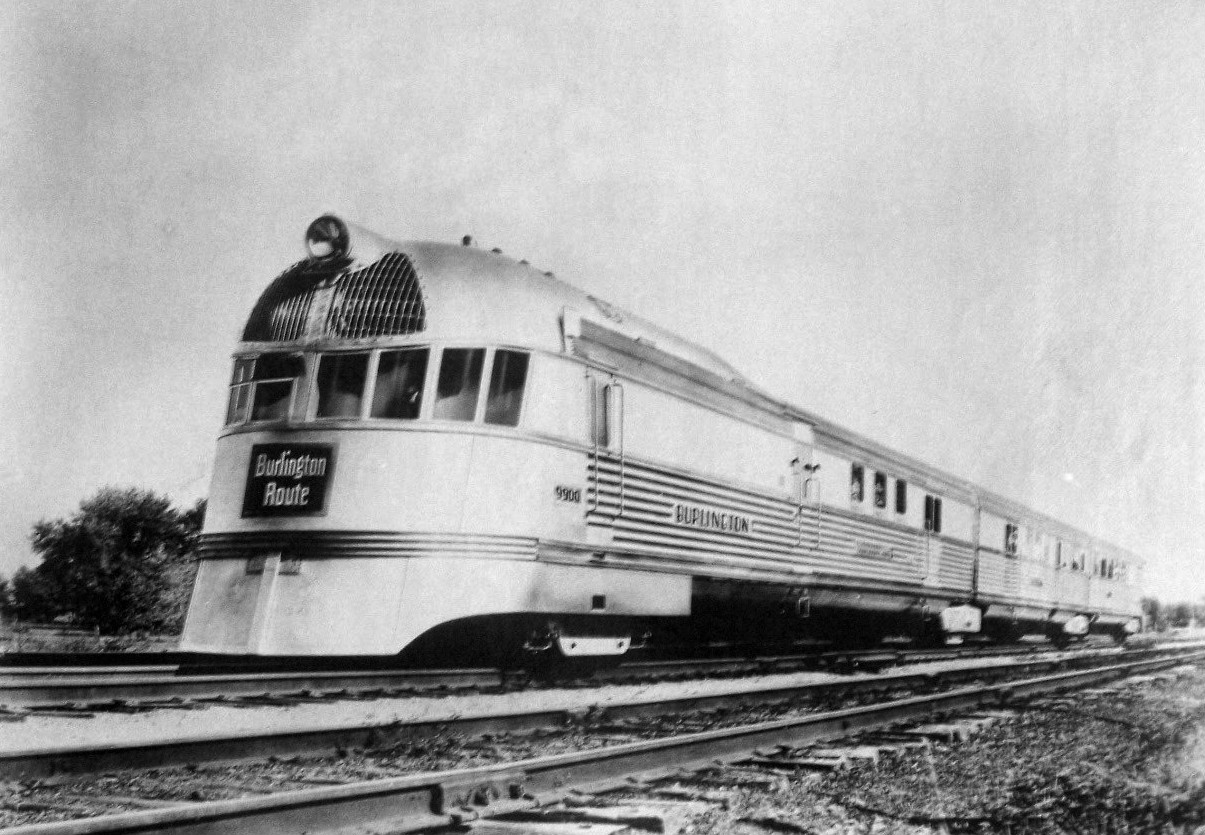
The Pioneer Zephyr in 1935

According to John H. White, the Silver Slipper was a "costly failure" that was "extremely embarrassing" to the Budd Company and ultimately forced the company to abandon its ambitious rubber-tired rail car program altogether. However, Budd did not give up on building lightweight, stainless-steel trains: its very next project was the highly successful Pioneer Zephyr.

Rubber-tired rail cars achieved greater success in France, as Michelin built 30 for the Eastern Railway of France in 1937. Furthermore, similar rubber-tired subway cars have been adopted in Canada and Mexico as well as on numerous systems in Europe.

Brian Solomon notes that the Silver Slipper is "sometimes cited as the first true streamlined passenger train", although "it remained relatively obscure and never received the national media attention enjoyed by later streamlined trains". Karl Zimmermann concurs, observing that while "the Zephyr and Union Pacific's M-10000 typically vie for the title of 'first streamliner'", the Silver Slipper is deserving of consideration for the honor.

== See also ==
- Rubber-tyred metro
- Rubber-tyred trams
