= McKeen railmotor =

Locomotive

McKeen Railmotor
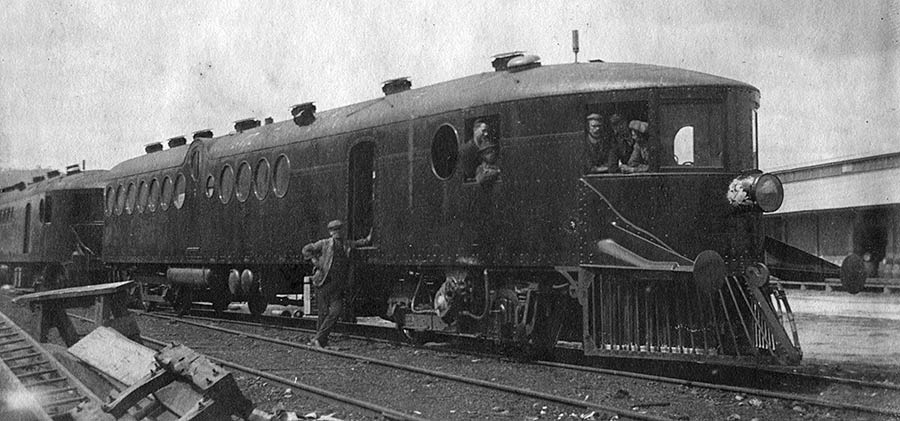
- McKeen railmotor in Wodonga, Australia, 1911.
- Manufacturers: McKeen Company of Omaha, Nebraska, U.S.A.
- Designer: McKeen Company
- Constructed: 1914
- Number built: 152

Specifications
- Car length: 55 ft (16.76 m) and 70 ft (21.34 m)
- Prime mover: Gasoline
- Engine type: Distillate fueled engine
- Cylinder count: 6
- Power output: 100 hp (75 kW)
- Track gauge: 3 ft 6 in (1,067 mm), 4 ft 8 1/2 in (1,435 mm) and 5 ft 3 in (1,600 mm)

The McKeen Railmotor was a 6-cylinder self-propelled railcar or railmotor. When McKeen Company of Omaha, Nebraska, U.S.A., first unveiled the car in 1905, the McKeen was among the first engines with a distillate-fueled motor. Revisions to the McKeen car led to the modern self-propelled gasoline rail-motor vehicle, and the "contours of the porthole windows, the front-mounted gasoline engines, and other features anticipated the streamline concept."

== Design ==
William R. McKeen was the superintendent of motive power and machinery at Union Pacific Railroad in 1904 when Edward H. Harriman, the head of UP, began encouraging him to develop the machine. The result of his experiments that year was a "knife-nosed" or "windsplitter" unit that slightly resembled a submarine on wheels, having a distinctive pointed nose, a rounded rear end, center-entry doors and porthole windows.

Two lengths were offered, 55 and 70 feet (17 and 21 m), and both could be configured with either a large mail and express area ahead of the center doors, a smaller mail and express area, or fully fitted with seats, which provided a maximum passenger capacity of 64 or 105 respectively. Cheaper and more powerful than battery-powered vehicles, the McKeen was more flexible than steam locomotives and could operate at competitive speeds.

== In service ==
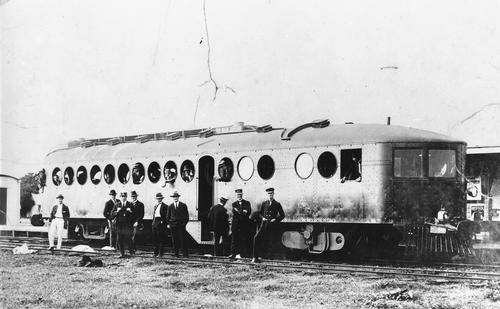
Queensland Railways McKeen car, c. 1913

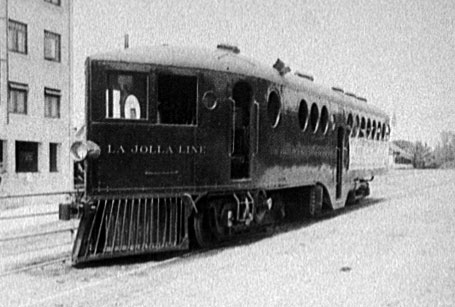
A McKeen car belonging to the Los Angeles and San Diego Beach Railway, the "La Jolla Line".

=== Canada ===
Two McKeen cars were operated by the Alberta and Great Waterways Railway between Edmonton and Lac La Biche.

=== United States ===
The McKeen was popular from 1915 through the 1930s throughout the United States, and the cars were featured on the Union Pacific and the Southern Pacific.

=== Victoria, Australia ===
ABCL cars
- Manufacturer: Victorian Railways

Specifications
- Car body construction: Steel
- Car length: 66 ft (20.12 m) over body 69 ft 5 1/8 in (21.16 m) over coupling points
- Width: 9 ft 6 in (2.90 m)
- Height: 11 ft 9 3/16 in (3.59 m)
- Weight: 24 LT 16 cwt 3 qtr (25.24 t)
- Bogies: 40 ft 2 in (12.24 m) centres 9 ft 5 in (2.9 m) former engineroom end bogie 9 ft (2.7 m) former passenger-end bogie 44 ft 7 in (13.59 m) total wheelbase.
- Track gauge: 5 ft 3 in (1,600 mm)

Two McKeen railmotors were purchased by the Victorian Railways, and delivered in 1911. They were used to run the Ballarat to Maryborough and Hamilton to Warrnambool services, and briefly, between March and April 1913, the Maryborough to St Arnaud service.

The railmotors proved to be very unreliable, and only lasted for about three years as self-propelled vehicles. They were de-engined in 1919, and converted to passenger cars numbered as 1 & 2 ABCL, for use on the Altona line. They were scrapped in August 1926.

=== Queensland, Australia ===
In June 1911, Queensland Railways ordered five railcars from the McKeen Motor Co. at a cost of £4500 per unit. They were delivered in May 1913 and went into service with the running numbers one to five. The original seating capacity was 75, but that was later reduced to 69: 55 in the main section and 14 in the "smoker". The mechanical transmission proved to be unreliable and they were expensive to run, costing almost twice as much per mile as a steam-hauled passenger train.

By 1920, Car No 1 was out of commission. Cars No 2 and 5 were modified as Tourist or Day Inspection Cars, which included luxury appointments and seating for 32 passengers. All five units were written-off between 1929 and 1931, and were broken up soon after at the Ipswich workshops.

== Withdrawal ==
The Nevada State Railroad Museum completed the restoration of McKeen car, #22 of the Virginia and Truckee Railroad, a 70-foot (21.34 m) car by 9 May 2010. The original powerplant did not survive, but it was replaced with a modern engine and drive system to allow the car to transport visitors to the museum around its short track.

== See also ==
- Lakeside and Marblehead Railroad
- Railroads in Omaha
- Victorian Railways
- Weitzer railmotor, Europe's first railmotor produced in considerable numbers, at the same time as the McKeen Railmotor.
