= Electric transmission =

Electric transmission may refer to:

- Electric power transmission, the bulk movement of electrical energy from a generating site
  - Diesel–electric transmission, a transmission system for vehicles powered by diesel engines
  - Petrol–electric transmission, a transmission system for vehicles powered by petrol engines
  - Turbo-electric transmission, a transmission system for vehicles powered by steam turbine engines
  - Turbine–electric transmission, a transmission system for vehicles powered by gas turbine engines
