= Holt gas–electric tank =

First prototype military tank built in the United States

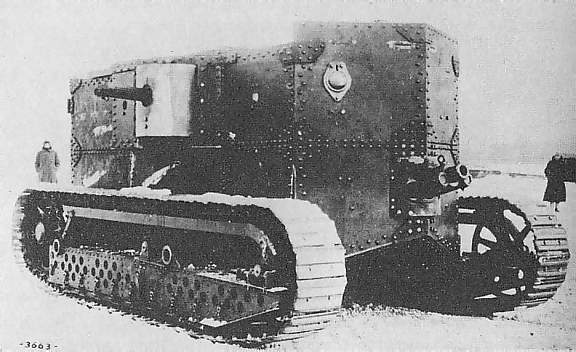
- Place of origin: United States

Production history
- Manufacturer: Holt Manufacturing Company and General Electric Company
- Produced: 1917-1918

Specifications
- Mass: 25.4 t (25.0 long tons; 28.0 short tons)
- Length: 5.03 m (16 ft 6 in)
- Width: 2.76 m (9 ft 1 in)
- Height: 2.37 m (7 ft 9 in)
- Crew: 6
- Armor: 6–15 mm
- Main armament: Vickers 75 mm mountain howitzer
- Secondary armament: two 7.62 mm (0.300 in) M1917 Browning machine guns
- Engine: 4-cylinder Holt gasoline 90 hp (67 kW)
- Power/weight: 3.5 hp/tonne
- Transmission: G.E.C. generator powering one electric motor per track
- Suspension: vertical coil springs
- Operational range: 50 km (31 mi)
- Maximum speed: 10 km/h (6.2 mph)

The Holt gas–electric tank was the first prototype tank built in the United States in a collaboration between the Holt Manufacturing Company (Note: Holt Manufacturing merged with the rival C. L. Best company for form Caterpillar Tractor Company in 1925) and the General Electric Company. The transmission was petrol-electric with gasoline engine coupled to generator driving electric motors connected to the tracks. Only a single example was built during 1917–1918, as testing proved it lacked the agility and maneuverability required. The crew number is often given as six, on the assumption there would be two machine gunners, a gunner and loader for the main gun, a driver and a commander.

== Construction ==
The tank was based on a lengthened and modified version of the suspension of the Holt Model 75, with pivoting track frames. There were ten road wheels at each side. The tank was 7 feet 9.5 inches (2.375 m) tall, 16 feet 6 inches (5.03 m) long, and 9 feet 1 inch (2.77 m) wide. The vehicle had a Holt 90 horsepower (67 kW), 4-cylinder engine fitted with a General Electric generator driving an electric motor for each track; a comparable petro-electric system had earlier been used for the French Saint-Chamond that also was fitted with a lengthened Holt suspension. To prevent overheating the transmission—a constant problem with electrical types—a complicated water-cooling system had been installed..

== Armament ==
Like the French tank, the Holt gas–electric had a British designed 75 mm mountain gun placed low in the V-shaped nose; two removable 7.62mm Browning machine guns in sponsons one each side. The engine and transmission were in the rear, next to a corridor leading to the only door. Only one was built as tests showed its climbing performance was unsatisfactory, and it was much heavier than planned at about 25 short tons (23 t).

== Evaluation ==
The Holt proved to be a disappointing design, crawling along at a top speed of 6 mph and a range of only 31 miles. The cooling system added to the already too-heavy weight of the tank, which meant that it really struggled to climb even mild slopes. The project was abandoned after the one prototype had been completed and underwent trials.

== See also ==
- Gas–electric transmission
