= Woodstock and Sycamore Traction Company =

Overview
- Status: Defunct
- Termini: Sycamore, Illinois; Marengo, Illinois

Service
- Type: Interurban

History
- Opened: 1911
- Closed: 1918

Technical
- Track gauge: 4 ft 8 1/2 in (1,435 mm) standard gauge

The Woodstock and Sycamore Traction Company was a short-lived interurban railroad that operated from 1911 to 1918 between the cities of Sycamore and Marengo, Illinois; it never reached its intended destination of Woodstock. Its headquarters and repair shop were in the city of Genoa, midway on the route. The 26.5-mile (42.6 km) track was never electrified, due to lack of funds, so gasoline-powered cars were used. Three 55-foot (16.8 m) McKeen cars were purchased, but the large cars proved unsatisfactory; they were replaced by two smaller Fairbanks-Morse cars.
