= Union Pacific Railroad Omaha Shops Facility =

Former shop for trains in Omaha, Nebraska, U.S.

Coordinates: 41°15′49″N 95°55′40″W

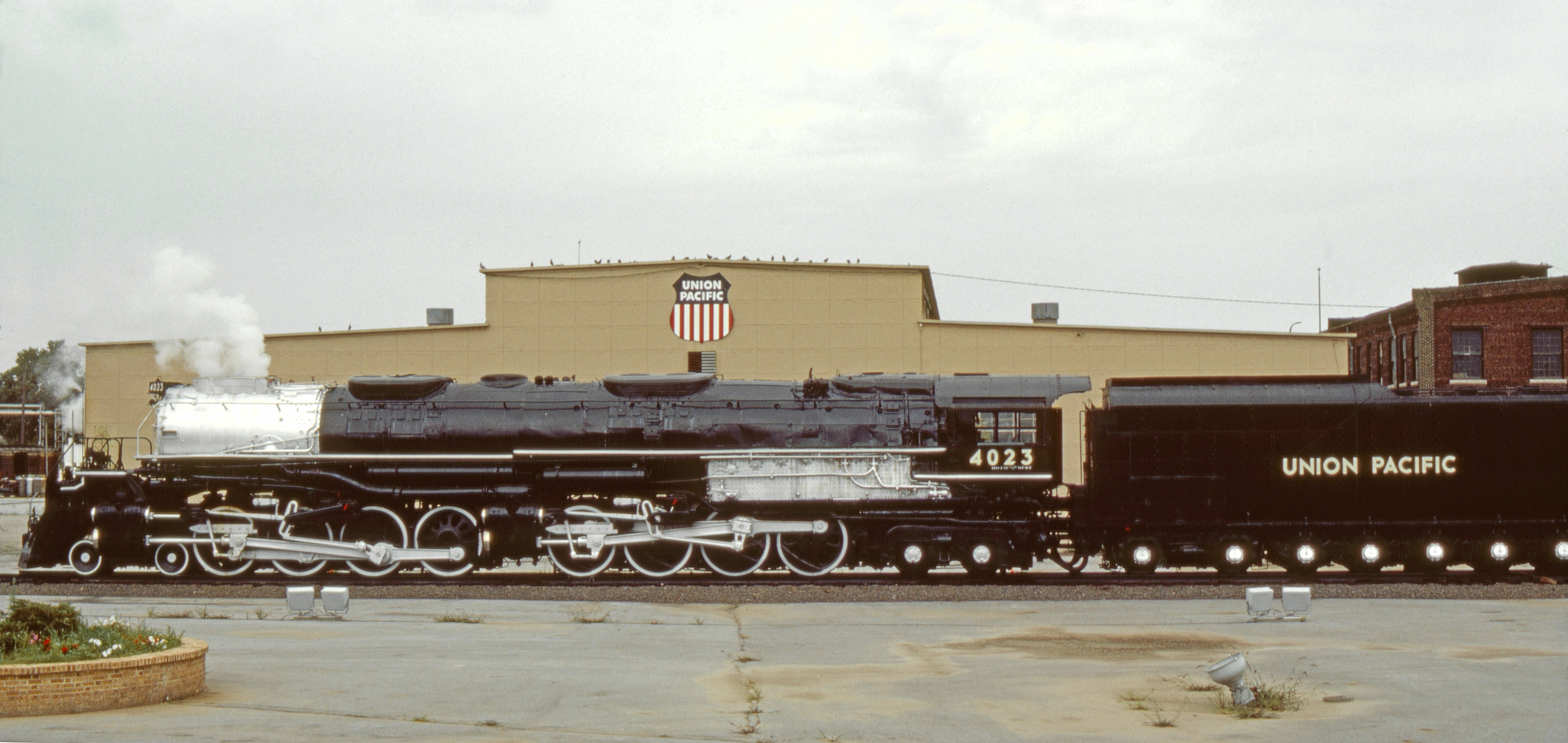
Union Pacific 4023 outside of the Omaha Shops in August 1976

The Union Pacific Railroad Omaha Shops Facility was a 100-acre (0.40 km^{2}) shop for the trains of the Union Pacific located at North 9th and Webster in Downtown Omaha. With the first locomotives arriving in 1865, it took until the 1950s for the facility to become the major overhaul and maintenance facility for the railroad. This lasted until 1988 when UP moved most of the operations out-of-state. Demolition began soon afterwards.

== About ==
The shops were equipped for the complete overhaul and repair of all railroad equipment. The General Sherman, also known as Engine Number 1, arrived from St. Louis, Missouri in 1865. The Great Flood of 1881 covered the entire facility with dirt, and later sand pumped from the Missouri River bed. In 1905 William R. McKeen, Jr. invented the track motorcar there, later forming the McKeen Motor Car Company on the site at the insistence of UP head E. H. Harriman.

== Closure ==
In 1994 the City of Omaha asked the Union Pacific and several other properties on the Omaha Riverfront about voluntarily cleaning up their properties, as part of a greater riverfront revitalization effort. The Environmental Protection Agency issued an Administrative Order on Consent to the UP in 2000, which required the railroad to investigate and clean up releases of hazardous wastes on the site. The Union Pacific facility then entered the Nebraska Voluntary Cleanup Program, effectively closing the facility forever.

Since 2003, the site has been the location of CenturyLink Center.

== See also ==
- History of Omaha
