= William R. McKeen Jr. =

Inventor of track motorcar (1869 - 1946)

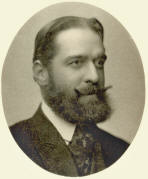
William Riley McKeen

William R. McKeen Jr. (2 October 1869 – 19 October 1946) was the inventor of the track motorcar. While serving as the superintendent of motive power and machinery for the Union Pacific he developed the McKeen railmotor, later launching the McKeen Motor Car Company at the insistence of UP head E.H. Harriman. His company was located at the Union Pacific Railroad Omaha Shops Facility in Omaha, Nebraska.

He was the son of prominent Terre Haute banker William Riley McKeen Sr. (1829–1913).

== See also ==
- History of Omaha
