= Weitzer railmotor =

Historic European internal combustion railcar

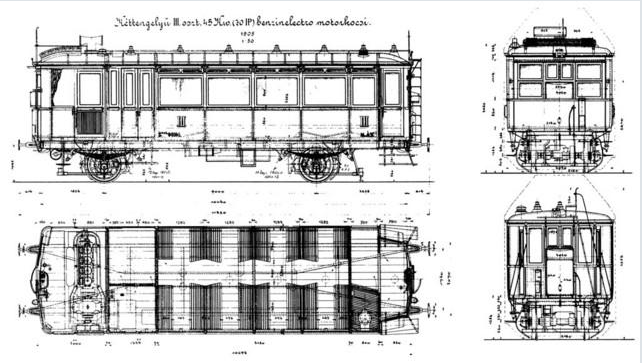
Plan of a prototype

The railmotors of J. Weitzer Engine- & Waggon-Building & Iron Casting Joint-stock Company (Hu.: Weitzer János Gép,- Waggongyár és Vasöntöde Részvénytársaság) were Europe's first self-propelled railcars with internal combustion engine built in considerable numbers. The principle of their petrol–electric transmission and the four-cylinder petrol engines came from De Dion-Bouton in France. The electric engines were produced Siemens-Schuckert in Germany.

The first cars were constructed in 1903, the series since 1906. Reports of their use can be added to a total of 65 sold railmotors and 40 trailers. Most of these railmotors were built for 1,435 mm (4 ft 8 1/2 in) standard gauge, 11 for metre gauge and 11 for 760 mm (2 ft 5 15/16 in) Bosnian gauge. The last ones ran on petrol-electric traction till 1960.

== History ==
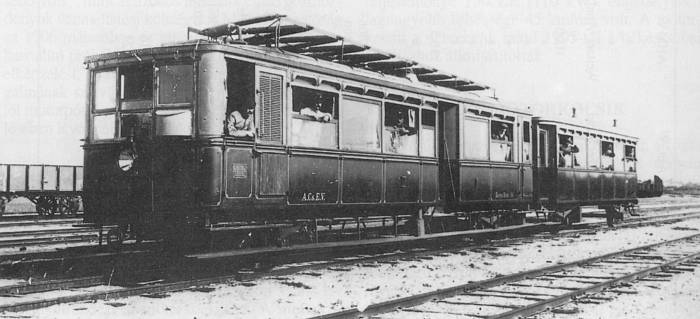
One of the first serially produced railmotors for ACsEV

The Hungarian minister of trade, Lajos Láng, started a campaign for the development of self-propelled railcars in order to economize passenger transport on secondary railroads. The producers involved were Ganz & Cie., Weitzer Janos Rt., and Daimler-Benz, which fell out of competition. At first, two railcars with petrol engine and mechanical transmission were built, but they did not fit the demands.

Ganz & Cie., though very inventive on other subjects, choose a conventional solution, and in 1904 installed a steam engine instead of the petrol motor. This type of self-propelled railcars became class CmotVIIIa and CmotVIIIb of Hungarian State Railways (MÁV).

Weitzer's Company was more innovative (Johann Weitzer himself had died in 1902). They used the electric transmission, which De Dion-Bouton company had constructed for a small motor car of Pieper Company in Liège, Belgium. In that car De Dion Bouton even had installed a rechargeable electrochemical cell, so that this was the first car with hybrid traction.

== Technology ==
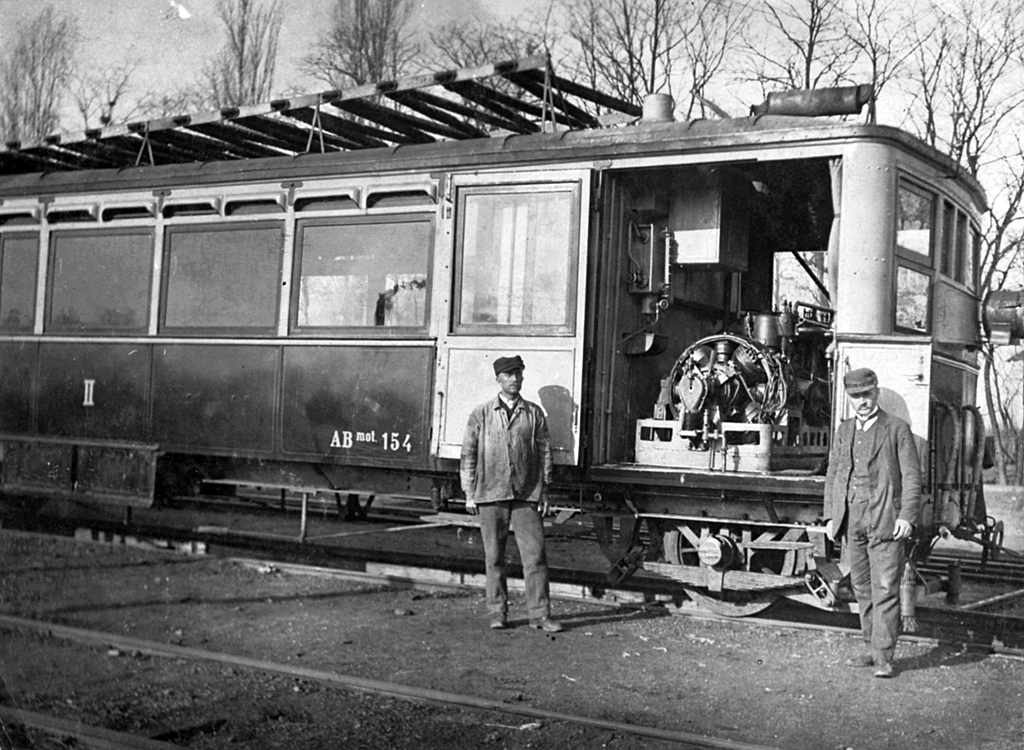
Engine

Weitzer Rt. in 1903 transferred the electric transmission to a larger scale, and ordered four-cylinder petrol engines of 50 and of 70 horsepower from De Dion-Bouton. Such a motor was placed in the engine compartment of each railcar, behind the driver's place. By a common axle, it empowered an electric generator. The electricity fed the driving motors of 30 hp each, which were placed underfloor, one at each of the two axles of the car. All of the electric equipment was produced by Siemens-Schuckert.

A battery of electrochemical accumulators (which would have supplied enough energy to move the car) was not installed. But the electric voltage had a level that permitted to feed the propelling motors from a catenary. One of the railways using the cars later took that chance.

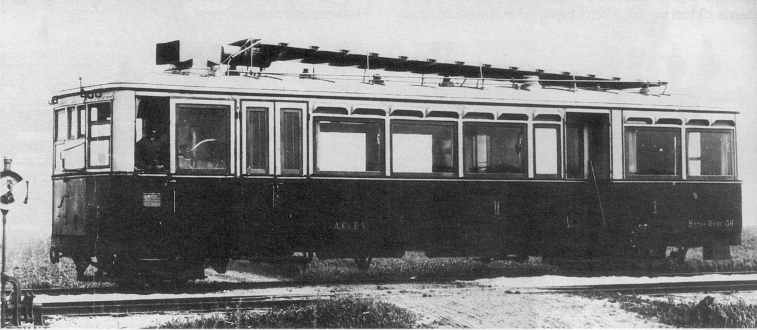
Another serially produced ACsEV railmotor

Differing from the original plan, all photos of those railmotors in service show some installations above the roofs; on the Hungarian cars there were radiators, on the Romanian cars long exhaust tubes.

The top speed of these railmotors was about 60 to 70 km/h. All had conventional couplers on both ends, the standard gauge cars with couples of buffers, the narrow gauge cars with single buffers. Thus they could haul up to two lightweight trailers.

== Types and usage ==
The greatest number was bought by the ACsEV (Aradi és Csanádi Egyesült Vasutak / Arad & Csanad United Railways) that operated a huge standard gauge network around Arad. In 1910, they had 41 railmotors and 37 trailers. The prototype railmotors had only one closed platform on the rear, a weight of 15 tons and 40 third class passenger seats. The later models were a bit longer, had a central platform, and two classes of seats.

The two railcars bought by Căile Ferate Române (Romanian National Railways) in 1907 had one platform in the end as access for the third class section and a central platform as access for the 1st class compartment.

The metric AHMV (Arad-Hegyaljai Motorosított Vasút / Arad hillfoots motor railway, better known as Arad-Podgoria Local Railway) was opened in 1906 with eleven petrol-electric railmotors from Weitzer. As early as 1911–1913 it was electrified and in 1913 the internal combustion cars were converted to passenger trailers with a luggage compartment.

The AEGV (Alföldi Első Gazdasági Vasút / Alföld's First Rural Railway), working on 152 km of 760 mm (2 ft 5 15/16 in) gauge, in 1906/1907 bought four cars directly from Weitzer factory, and in 1916, two ones second hand from Gyulavidéki Vasút (Gyulaland railway). The railcars for 760 mm (2 ft 5 15/16 in) gauge were a bit smaller than those for standard gauge, but they had the same structure of rooms.

The NyVKV (Nyíregyházavidéki Kisvasutak / Nyíregyháza Outskirts Narrow-gauge Railways), opened in 1905 also on 760 mm (2 ft 5 15/16 in) gauge, bought four Weitzer railmotors in 1906 and one more in 1907. When in 1911 the section inside Nyíregyháza was converted into an electric tramline, the petrol-electric railcars were equipped with bow collectors, so that in town all trains could run without emissions. At the same time, the company bought electric railcars and one additional petrol-electric railmotor from Ganz & Cie.

== Residuals ==
In 1945, those Weitzer railmotors that still existed in Hungary, became property of Hungarian State Railway MÁV. Six of them were transferred to BHÉV (Budapesti Helyiérdekű Vasút / Budapest Commuter Railway) in 1960. It updated two of these railcars, exchanging the petrol engines for diesel engines, and hiding the radiators on the roofs by parapets. Another car was given to a museum. Short after 2000, one of the updated railmotors was refreshed once more, to the state of 1960/1961, but with the actual colours of the company.

== General aspects ==
Produced almost at the same time as the McKeen railmotors, the Weitzer railmotors were an equivalent step in railway development. Some of them ran for more than fifty years with their original engines and transmissions, which is a compliment for their constructors. Their construction was a work of international co-operation. Just therefore they might have been almost forgotten, as their history was lacking of heroic inventors and inappropriate for national monuments.

== Literature ==
- Arnold Heller: Der Automobilmotor im Eisenbahnbetriebe, Leipzig 1906, reprinted by Salzwasserverlag 2011, ISBN 978-3-86444-240-7
