= Great Flood of 1881 =

Missouri River flood

The Great Flood of 1881 was along the Missouri River between April 1, 1881, and April 27, 1881. The flood began around Pierre, South Dakota and struck areas down river in Yankton, South Dakota, Omaha, Nebraska, Council Bluffs, Iowa, Nebraska City, Nebraska, Kansas City, Missouri, and farther south. This was the first detailed reporting of Missouri River flooding, and caused millions of dollars in damage.

== History ==
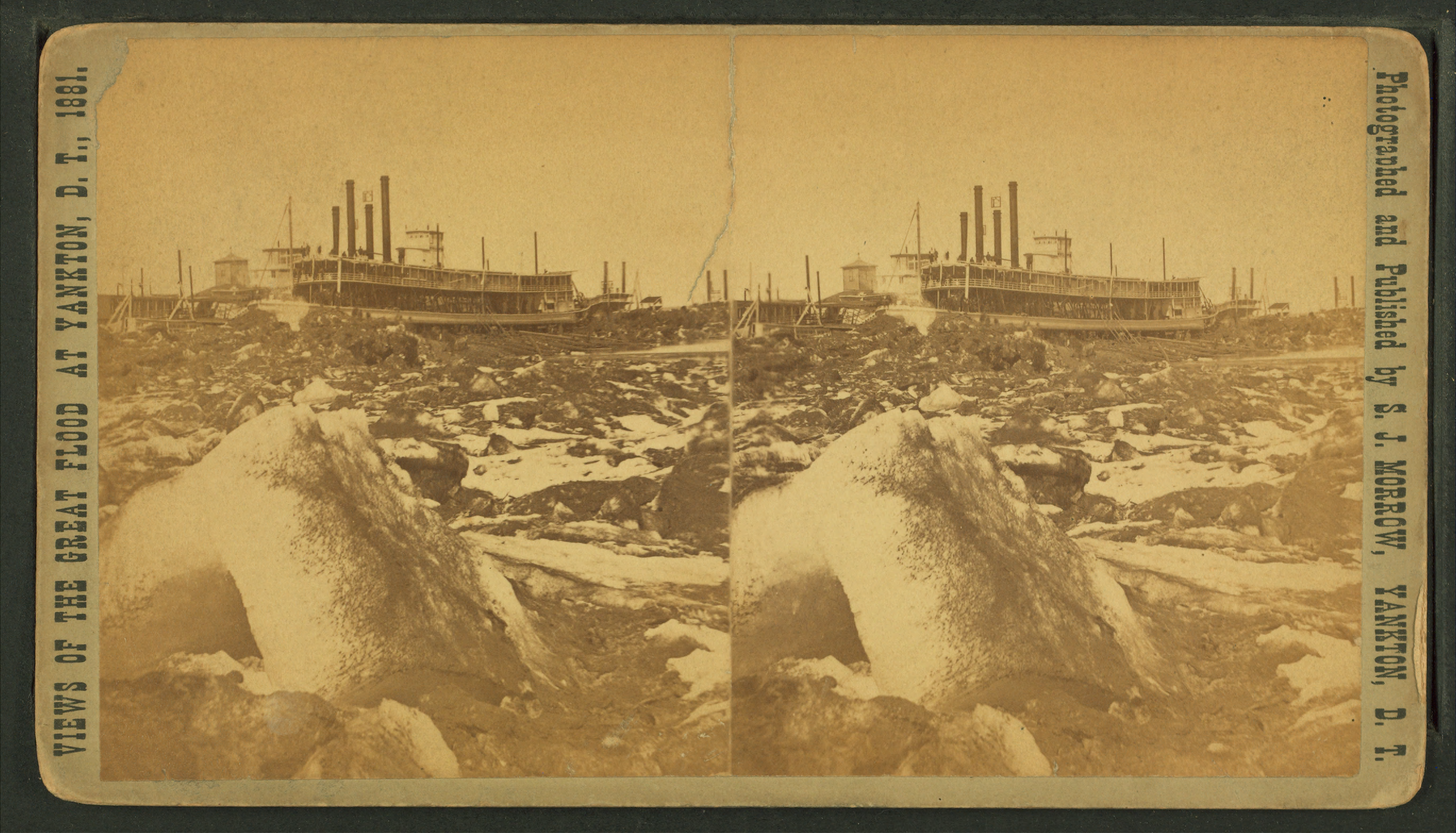
Yankton's riverfront was flooded in March 1881.

Snowfall in the winter of 1880–1881 was unusually heavy, and March 1881 remained extraordinarily cold until its last week. Melting snow in the Dakotas, north of Nebraska, poured water into the Missouri River.

John Hilger, an early resident of Pierre, South Dakota said, "When the snow started to disappear, it left in a hurry. The river rose very rapidly, the ice gorged a short distance below town, turning the water into the bottoms and flooded the town with from four to six feet of water. Those who were not so fortunate as to possess two story houses were obliged to retreat to higher ground. My dugout was filled with women and children and I was obliged to seek quarters elsewhere because of the lack of room."

=== Omaha and Council Bluffs ===
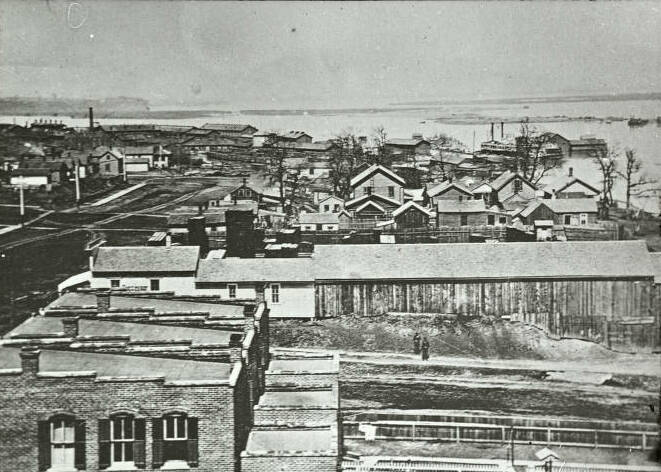
Omaha was flooded in April 1881.

Downtown Omaha was flooded up to 9th Street, and Council Bluffs was flooded the same. The river remained at a high level for several weeks and during the height of flooding was reported to have been 5 miles (8.0 km) wide. Omaha's entire shipping industry was damaged, with industrial, trade, and docking buildings severely damaged or destroyed. Losses were said to be "in the millions".

Omaha had only two deaths during the flood. A small one-man skiff was used by three Union Pacific workers who attempted to cross a break in a temporary dam when the river's current pushed it into the main channel. Two men jumped from the boat and drowned immediately.

The Omaha Bee covered the flood each day from April 2 through April 13.

=== Lake Manawa ===
After the flood in the area south of Council Bluffs, the Missouri River had looped itself in a hairpin bend, leaving an old channel filled with quiet water. The body of water left stranded by the river's change, covering about 400 acres (160 ha), later became Lake Manawa, a popular recreation area in the Omaha-Council Bluffs metropolitan area.

=== Nebraska City and Eastport ===
As the river rose, people attempted to save the lowlands of Iowa along the Missouri River. By April 9, the steamboat ferry Lizzie Campbell had difficulty in landing passengers at Nebraska City in deep water. Passengers were unloaded only by cart.

By April 11, all of the Iowan lowlands were under water.

By the middle of May, the river had risen to the highest point in the history of Nebraska City and Fremont County, Iowa and its course was changed considerably when the waters finally fell to normal.

== Timeline ==
On the morning of April 1, word was received from Yankton, South Dakota that the Missouri River rose thirty-five feet, killing several people and destroying the lowlands in that area. The railroads received warnings from points north and advised people in the area to leave the river bottoms. They moved their rolling stock and equipment to higher lands throughout the area.

In the afternoon of April 6, a temporary dam around riverfront businesses in Omaha burst. During this period the Omaha Smelting Works and Union Pacific Shops almost completely submerged. The following morning floodwaters crested at 23.5 feet (7.2 m), which was two feet higher than ever recorded on the river. The Missouri had also reached a width of 5 miles (8.0 km), effectively covering all the lowlands around Omaha and Council Bluffs.

On the morning of April 9, the North Western Railroad levee bounding Council Bluffs against the river broke and water spread over the west and south sections of the city. An anonymous man rode a horse through the south part of the city to warn residents when the levee gave way. Rescue shelters were placed throughout the area, with "any building that was suitable was thrown open to the refugees."

After that event, from Ninth Street in Council Bluffs west to Omaha and from Carter Lake south beyond the Union Pacific Shops looked like "a sea" dotted with houses and outbuildings like islands. Boats and large sections of wooden sidewalks were pressed into service, with the operators earning from $15 to $20 (equivalent to about $670 in 2025) per day.

On April 12, water started receding, with railroads clearing up and repairing tracks immediately. Families returned to their homes to begin cleaning out water. However, on April 22, the river stage increased at one foot per hour, causing people again to move to higher land. This time when the river broke its banks, the water spread to Eighth Street and Broadway in Council Bluffs. Houses, trees, and livestock floated downriver.

By April 25, the Union Pacific Shops remained flooded as the river rose another two inches. A riverfront packinghouse and the Willow Springs Distilling Company were flooded, along with many smaller riverside businesses. 1,600 workers were unemployed at this point. In Council Bluffs 600 people were homeless, with more than a half of the city inundated with water. During the previous several weeks, the Elkhorn River valley was flooded, with the entire town of Waterloo, Nebraska abandoned due to flooding.

On April 27, the river began to recede and families returned to their homes. General Grenville M. Dodge, the chief engineer in charge of the construction of the Union Pacific, had employees ride through the flooded areas to rescue cattle. The river dropped 10 inches (250 mm) on the 27th.

== See also ==
- Geography of Omaha
- The Long Winter (novel) describes the events of the 1880–1881 winter that caused the Great Flood in the spring of 1881
- Severe winter of 1880–1881
