= ACsEV =

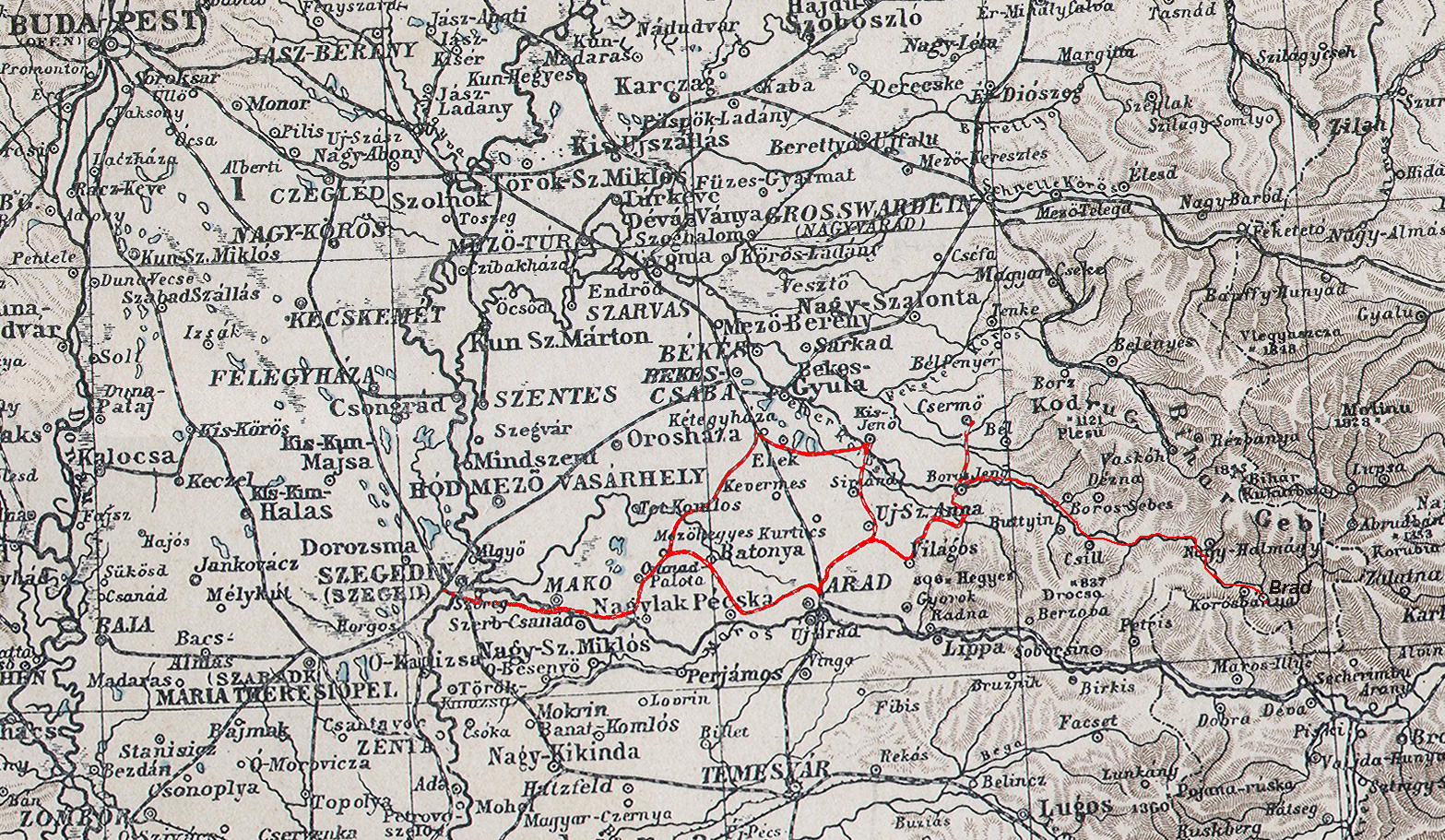
Rail network of ACsEV in 1910, marked in a map from 1890

The ACsEV (Aradi és Csanádi Egyesült Vasutak, En.: Arad & Csanad United Railways) were a Hungarian joint-stock railway company. Till 1920, the network had a length of 391 km. Since 1903, the company bought more than forty petrol-electric self-propelled rail cars, and thus for some years performed one of the most advanced passenger transports in the world. Due to changes of the borders, in 1920 more than half of the company's network was taken over by the Romanian Railways (CFR).

== Predecessors ==
The Arad–Körösvölgyi Vasút (Arad – Körös-Valley Railway was founded in 1873. From 1 February 1877 to 25 September 1881, it built its line from Arad northeastward to Boressebes (Ro.: Sebiș) in the Fehér-Körös (Crişul Alb) valley.

The Arad–Csanádi Vasút (Arad–Csanád Railway), licensed in 1881, built its Y-shaped network between Arad and Szeged in the short space of time from 5 November 1882 to 20 May 1883.

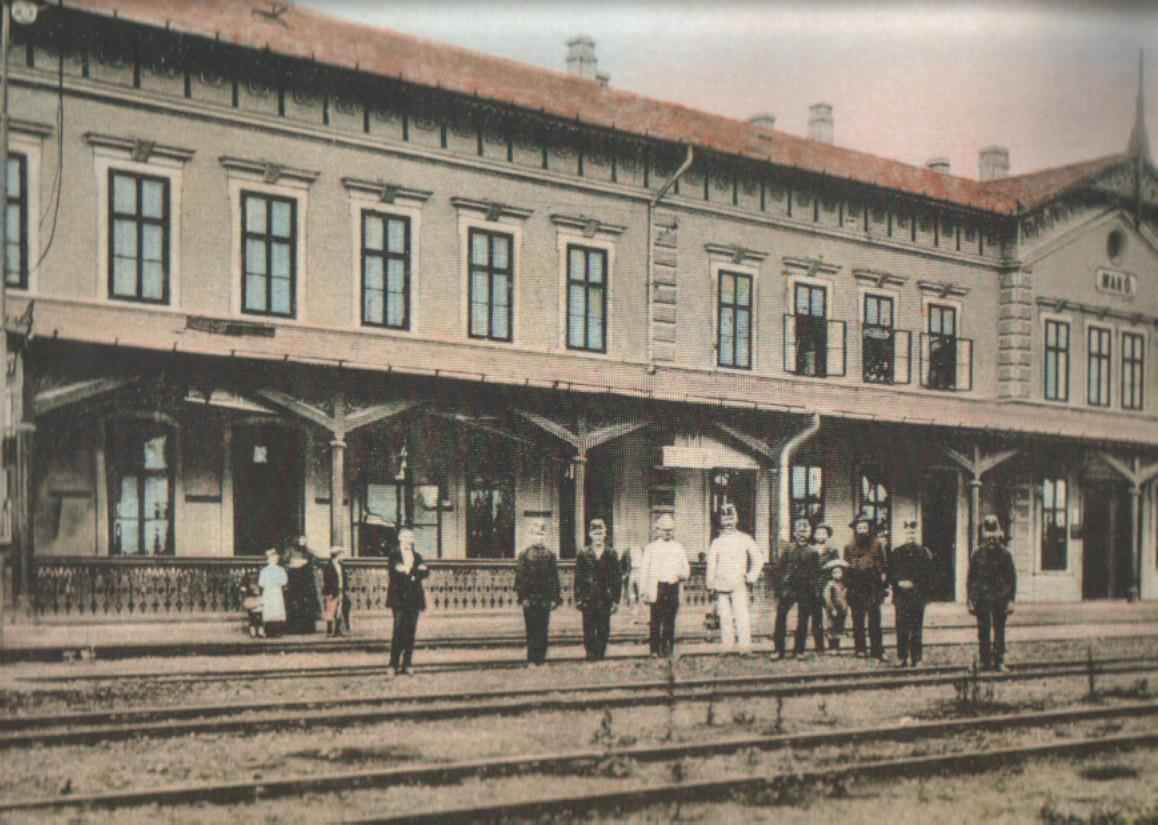
Makó station in 1900

In 1886, both companies merged to form Aradi és Csanádi Egyesült Vasutak. Soon the railway to Kisjenő was built. In 1889 the branch to Csermő was opened, and in 1889–1896, the line in Crişul Alb valley was prolonged to Brad.

=== Tracks ===
The network consisted of two main lines, connecting Arad in opposite directions, and three side lines, two of which forming a circle.

- Arad** = Uj-Szent-Anna (Sântana) – Pankota (Pâncota) – Borosjenő (Ineu) – Borossebes (Sebiș) – Brád (Brad) (167 km)
  - Uj-Szent-Anna (Sântana) = Kisjenő (Chișineu-Criș) ≠ Kétegyháza** (49 km, due to a 120°-turn in Kisjenö almost two lines)
  - Borosjenő – Csermő (Cermei) (14 km)
- Arad** ≠ Mezőhegyes – Nagylak (Nădlac) – Apátfalva – Makó* – Kiszombor – Szőreg* ▬ Szeged* (121 km)
  - Mezőhegyes – Kovácsháza° – Kétegyháza** (40 km)

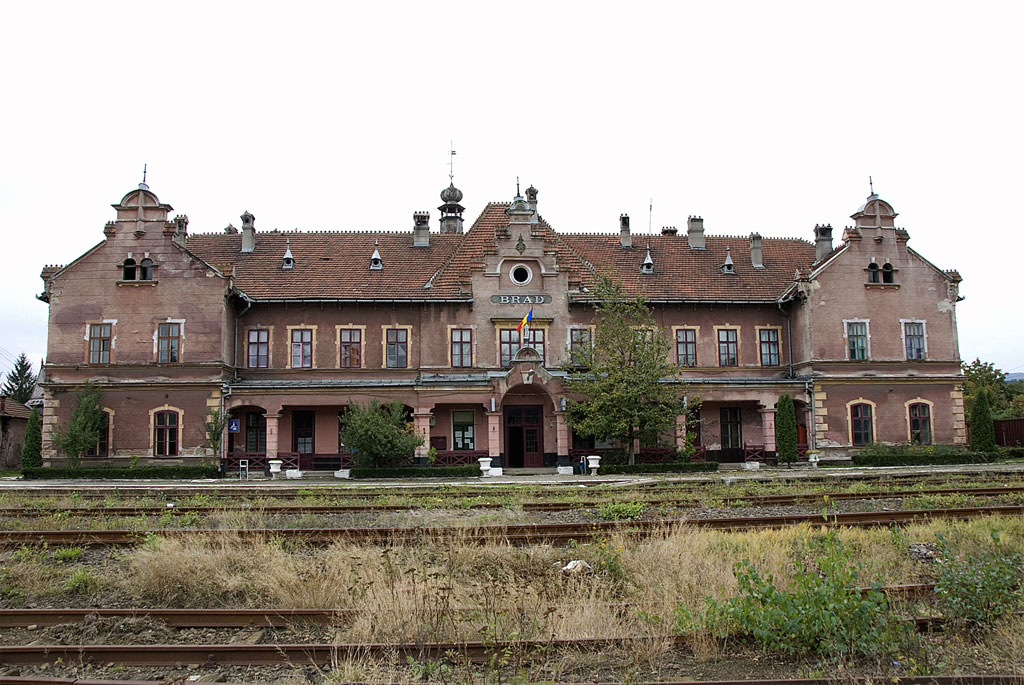
Brad station in 2008

Explanation:

1910 – 1918:

** connection to Hungarian State Railways' (MÁV)-line Szolnok – Arad – Temesvár (Timișoara)
* connection to other MÁV-lines
▬ joint use of a MÁV-line
° connection to narrow gauge AEGV (Alföldi Első Gazdasági Vasút, En.: Alföld First Rural Railway)
Actuel situation:
= today part of C.F.R.-line 310 Arad – Oradea
≠ today interrupted
(in brackets: Romanian names)

=== Rolling stock ===
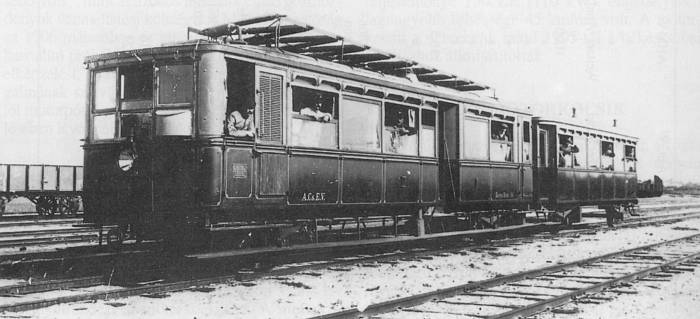
Weitzer railmotor of the ACsEV

End of 1910 the company owned 41 petrol–electric Weitzer railmotors and 37 adequate trailers, furthermore 38 steam engines, 41 conventional passenger cars, 30 luggage cars, 30 luggage cars with a conductors' compartment, 9 mailcars, and 2069 freightcars.

The railmotors allowed quite a dense frequency of trains for local commuter traffic as well as for longer distances. They ran as ordinary trains, as express trains, and as mail trains.

== Szeged–Csanádi Vasút ==
As a result of the treaty of Trianon, the network of ACsEV was divided in 1920. More than half of it came to Romania and was taken over by Căile Ferate Române (C.F.R.): since 1923 was operated by CFR, and in 1927 the whole company was bought by the Romanian state. The Hungarian rest was operated by Győr-Sopron-Ebenfurti Vasút (GySEV) and in 1927 it was renamed to Szeged–Csanádi Vasút (Szeged–Csanádi Railway). In 1945 it was taken over by Ungarian State Railway MÁV.
