= Geography of Omaha =

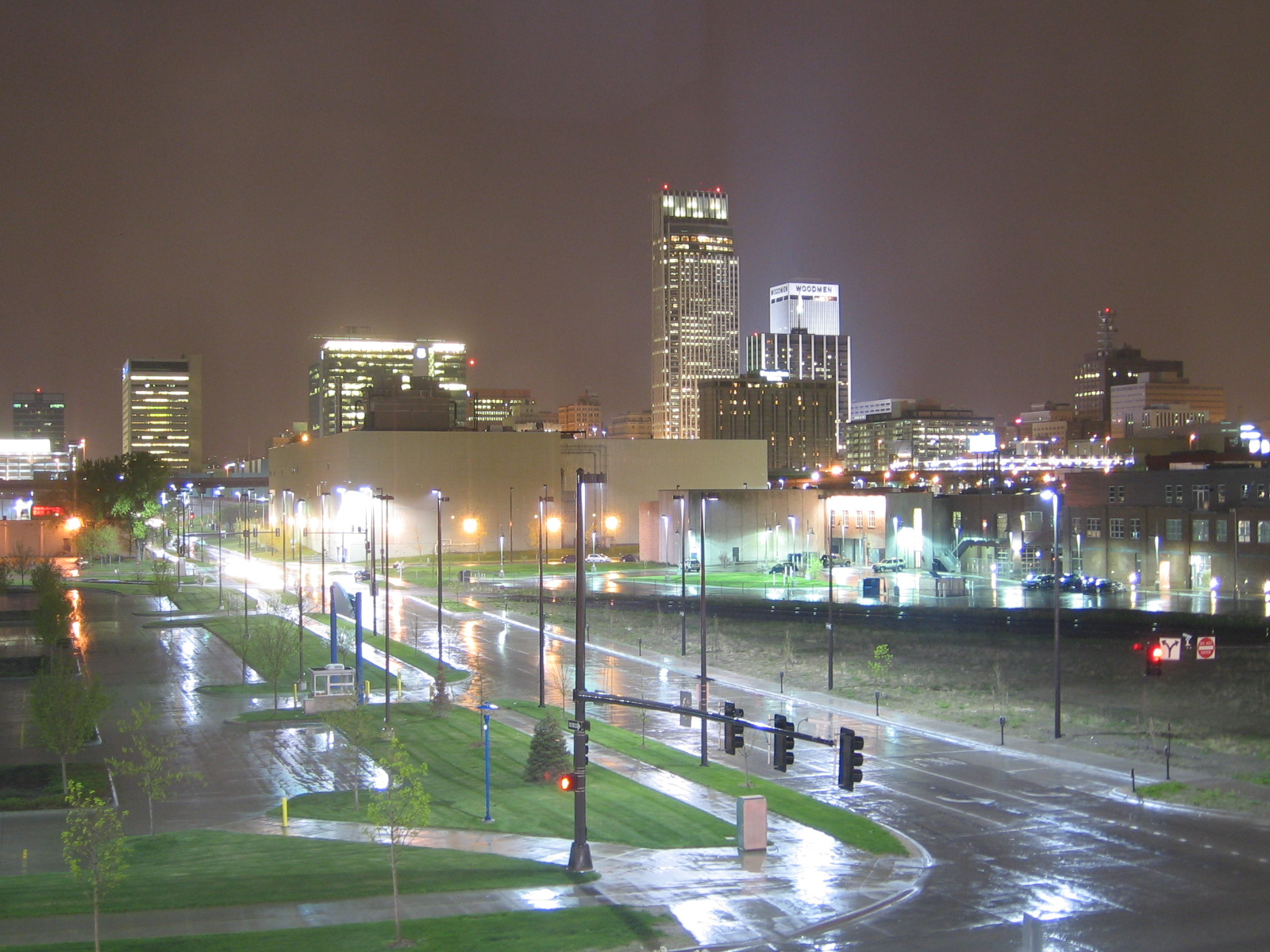
Downtown Omaha's skyline during rainy night.

The geography of Omaha, Nebraska is characterized by its riverfront position alongside the Missouri River. The city's geography, with its proximity to the river was a factor in making Omaha the "Gateway of the West" from which thousands of settlers traveled into the American West during the 19th century. Environmental issues include more than one hundred years of industrial smelting along the riverfront along with the continuous impact of suburban sprawl on the city's west side. The city's climate is temperate.

== Geography ==
Omaha is located at 41°15′38″N 96°0′47″W. According to the United States Census Bureau, the city has a total area of 118.9 square miles (307.9 km^{2}).

Situated in the Midwestern United States on the shore of the Missouri River in eastern Nebraska, the Port of Omaha helped the city grow in significance as a trading city. Much of Omaha is built in the Missouri River Valley. Other significant bodies of water in the Omaha-Council Bluffs metropolitan area include Lake Manawa, Papillion Creek, Carter Lake, Platte River and the Glenn Cunningham Lake.

The city's land has been altered considerably by human intervention, with substantial regrading throughout Downtown Omaha and scattered across the city. Minor land reclamation efforts, along with dams further upstream, have brought dozens of acres along the Missouri into usage. Many of the natural variations in topography have been evened out.

East Omaha sits on a flood plain west of the Missouri River. The area is the location of Carter Lake, an oxbow lake. The lake was once the site of East Omaha Island. In the crux of Carter Drive is an unnamed sulphur spring, and located south of there is Hardwood Creek. East Omaha was once the location of Florence Lake, which dried up at some point in the 1920s.

== Cityscape ==
Similar to many other Western U.S. cities, Omaha was developed on a grid plan with the city center at the Missouri River and Dodge Street. This intersection was initially near the Lone Tree Ferry, Omaha's impetus for founding; today the city's downtown surrounds the area.

=== Neighborhoods ===
An expansive city covering a substantial area, Omaha has many different neighborhoods. Dozens of small neighborhoods spread across several distinct areas in the city's core areas of Downtown Omaha, Midtown Omaha, South Omaha and North Omaha. West Omaha, Northwest Omaha, Southwest Omaha and several Sarpy County cities and towns surround the city.

== Climate ==
Omaha

Climate chart (precipitation, max. and min. temperature)
J	F	M	A	M	J	J	A	S	O	N	D
0.8 32 12	0.8 38 18	2.1 50 28	2.9 63 40	4.4 74 51	4 84 61	3.9 87 66	3.2 85 64	3.2 77 54	2.2 65 41	1.8 48 28	0.9 35 16
- █ Average max. and min. temperatures in °F
- █ Precipitation totals in inches
- Source: NOAA
Metric conversion
J	F	M	A	M	J	J	A	S	O	N	D
20 0 −11	20 3 −8	54 10 −2	75 17 4	113 23 10	100 29 16	98 31 19	82 30 18	81 25 12	56 18 5	46 9 −2	23 2 −9
- █ Average max. and min. temperatures in °C
- █ Precipitation totals in mm

Though located at approximately the same latitude as Rome, Italy, Omaha, by virtue of its location near the center of North America far from large bodies of water or mountain ranges, has a humid continental climate (Köppen climate classification Dfa), with hot summers and cold winters. Average July maximum and minimum temperatures are 87.4 °F (30.8 °C) and 65.9 °F (18.8 °C) respectively, with moderate humidity and relatively frequent thunderstorms, usually rather violent and capable of spawning severe weather or tornadoes; the January counterparts are 31.7 °F (−0.2 °C) and 11.6 °F (−11.3 °C), though temperatures may easily fall below 0 °F (−18 °C) or rise above 50 °F (10 °C). The maximum temperature recorded in the city is 114 °F (46 °C), the minimum −32 °F (−36 °C). Average yearly precipitation is 30.2 inches (767 mm), falling mostly in the warmer months, as winter precipitation is more often in the form of lower-moisture-content snowfall, averaging 26.8 inches (68 cm) per season.

Omaha has had its share of natural disasters by water and wind. The city's Carter Lake was formed by a massive flood which altered the course of the Missouri River. The Great Flood of 1881 filled Omaha and Council Bluffs with water for almost a month, causing two fatalities and millions of dollars in damage. As many as 1,000 people were displaced by a flood in 1943, which sent the Missouri River, Carter Lake, and the old Florence Lake into homes and businesses throughout East Omaha. The flood of April 13, 1952, led to 40,000 people being evacuated from East Omaha and Carter Lake. President Harry S. Truman personally visited the scene of the flooding in Omaha and officially declared it a disaster area.

Several neighborhoods in Midtown and North Omaha were severely damaged by the Easter Sunday tornado of 1913, which destroyed many businesses and neighborhoods. More than 200 people died during the event. The Omaha Tornado of 1975 cut through 10 miles of streets and residences, crossing the city's busiest intersection at 72nd and Dodge. Three people were killed and 133 were reported injured.

Climate data for Omaha (Eppley Airfield), 1991–2020 normals (Note: Mean monthly maxima and minima (i.e. the expected highest and lowest temperature readings at any point during the year or given month) calculated based on data at said location from 1991 to 2020.), extremes 1871–present (Note: Official records for Omaha kept at the Weather Bureau Office from January 1871 to May 1935 and at Eppley Airfield since June 1935 except for June 1977 thru December 1993 when the official station was Omaha WSFO.)
Month	Jan	Feb	Mar	Apr	May	Jun	Jul	Aug	Sep	Oct	Nov	Dec	Year
Record high °F (°C)	69 (21)	80 (27)	96 (36)	96 (36)	103 (39)	107 (42)	114 (46)	111 (44)	104 (40)	96 (36)	83 (28)	74 (23)	114 (46)
Mean maximum °F (°C)	56.2 (13.4)	61.6 (16.4)	77.3 (25.2)	86.3 (30.2)	91.3 (32.9)	95.9 (35.5)	98.4 (36.9)	96.8 (36.0)	93.0 (33.9)	85.3 (29.6)	71.2 (21.8)	58.3 (14.6)	99.8 (37.7)
Mean daily maximum °F (°C)	33.6 (0.9)	38.6 (3.7)	52.1 (11.2)	64.1 (17.8)	74.6 (23.7)	84.4 (29.1)	88.1 (31.2)	85.8 (29.9)	79.1 (26.2)	65.5 (18.6)	50.3 (10.2)	37.7 (3.2)	62.8 (17.1)
Daily mean °F (°C)	24.4 (−4.2)	28.9 (−1.7)	41.0 (5.0)	52.6 (11.4)	63.6 (17.6)	73.9 (23.3)	78.1 (25.6)	75.7 (24.3)	67.6 (19.8)	54.4 (12.4)	40.2 (4.6)	28.7 (−1.8)	52.4 (11.3)
Mean daily minimum °F (°C)	15.2 (−9.3)	19.3 (−7.1)	30.0 (−1.1)	41.1 (5.1)	52.7 (11.5)	63.4 (17.4)	68.0 (20.0)	65.6 (18.7)	56.1 (13.4)	43.2 (6.2)	30.2 (−1.0)	19.8 (−6.8)	42.1 (5.6)
Mean minimum °F (°C)	−7.0 (−21.7)	−2.1 (−18.9)	8.8 (−12.9)	24.1 (−4.4)	37.1 (2.8)	49.8 (9.9)	55.8 (13.2)	53.6 (12.0)	39.4 (4.1)	25.7 (−3.5)	12.9 (−10.6)	−0.8 (−18.2)	−10.6 (−23.7)
Record low °F (°C)	−32 (−36)	−26 (−32)	−16 (−27)	5 (−15)	25 (−4)	39 (4)	44 (7)	43 (6)	28 (−2)	8 (−13)	−14 (−26)	−25 (−32)	−32 (−36)
Average precipitation inches (mm)	0.75 (19)	0.95 (24)	1.79 (45)	3.17 (81)	4.66 (118)	4.44 (113)	3.55 (90)	4.60 (117)	2.96 (75)	2.32 (59)	1.45 (37)	1.22 (31)	31.86 (809)
Average snowfall inches (cm)	7.2 (18)	7.8 (20)	3.0 (7.6)	1.0 (2.5)	0.1 (0.25)	0.0 (0.0)	0.0 (0.0)	0.0 (0.0)	0.0 (0.0)	0.5 (1.3)	1.7 (4.3)	5.8 (15)	27.1 (69)
Average extreme snow depth inches (cm)	5.5 (14)	6.2 (16)	3.2 (8.1)	0.6 (1.5)	0.1 (0.25)	0.0 (0.0)	0.0 (0.0)	0.0 (0.0)	0.0 (0.0)	0.4 (1.0)	0.8 (2.0)	3.6 (9.1)	9.1 (23)
Average precipitation days (≥ 0.01 in)	6.9	7.3	8.0	10.5	12.8	11.0	9.9	8.9	7.8	7.2	6.0	6.8	103.1
Average snowy days (≥ 0.1 in)	5.6	5.7	2.4	0.9	0.1	0.0	0.0	0.0	0.0	0.4	1.8	4.8	21.7
Average relative humidity (%)	71.1	71.1	66.3	60.6	63.8	65.8	68.3	70.9	71.8	67.4	71.1	73.8	68.5
Average dew point °F (°C)	12.7 (−10.7)	17.8 (−7.9)	26.8 (−2.9)	37.0 (2.8)	48.7 (9.3)	59.2 (15.1)	64.8 (18.2)	63.0 (17.2)	54.3 (12.4)	41.4 (5.2)	29.5 (−1.4)	17.6 (−8.0)	39.4 (4.1)
Mean monthly sunshine hours	167.8	157.6	206.4	230.1	277.1	314.0	332.5	296.3	245.5	217.5	148.0	134.1	2,726.9
Percentage possible sunshine	56	53	56	58	62	69	72	69	66	63	50	47	61
Average ultraviolet index	2	2	4	6	8	9	9	8	6	4	2	1	5
Source: NOAA (relative humidity 1961–1990 at Eppley Airfield, sun 1961–1990 at former Omaha NWS weather forecast office at 41.3536°N 96.0233°W)

== Environmental concerns ==
A 2004 report named northeast Omaha "one of the most dangerous toxic waste sites in the nation" after the United States Environmental Protection Agency (EPA) showed that more than 2,600 children in the area have lead poisoning. In early 2003, a large section of East Omaha was declared a Superfund site after thousands of yards tested positive for high levels of lead contamination resulting from a nearby lead smelter plant that operated for more than a century. The EPA partnered with the state, county and city to remediate the Omaha Lead Superfund site; however, a 2026 investigation by ProPublica showed that many residential properties in Omaha still contained high levels of lead.

== Natural disasters ==
In 1877 Omaha's Carter Lake was formed by a massive flood which altered the course of the Missouri River. The Great Flood of 1881 filled the Omaha and Council Bluffs with water for almost a month, causing two fatalities and millions of dollars in damage. As many as 1,000 people were displaced by a flood in 1943, which sent the Missouri River, Carter Lake, and the old Florence Lake into peoples' homes and businesses throughout East Omaha. The flood of April 13, 1952, led to 40,000 people being evacuated from East Omaha and Carter Lake. President Harry S. Truman personally visited the scene of the flooding in Omaha and officially declared it a disaster area.

Several neighborhoods in central Omaha and North Omaha were severely damaged by the Easter Sunday tornado of 1913, which destroyed many businesses and neighborhoods. More than 200 people died during the event. The Omaha Tornado of 1975 moved across 10 miles (16 km) of streets and residences, crossing the city's busiest intersection at 72nd & Dodge. Three people were killed and 133 reported injured. Over 4,000 buildings were damaged and 287 were destroyed. In terms of damage, it was the costliest tornado in American history to that date, with insurance costs estimated at up to $1.1 billion (in 1975 dollars).
