= Petrol–electric transmission =

Vehicle transmission system

Petrol–electric transmission (UK English), or gasoline–electric transmission or gas–electric transmission (US English), is a transmission system for vehicles powered by petrol engines. Petrol–electric transmission was used for a variety of applications in road, rail, and marine transport in the early 20th century. After World War I, it was largely superseded by diesel–electric transmission, a similar transmission system used for diesel engines; but petrol–electric has become popular again in modern hybrid electric vehicles.

Petrol–electric transmission was used in certain niche markets in the early 20th century, such as in the petrol–electric railway locomotives produced in Britain for use on the War Department Light Railways during World War I or for privately owned Arad & Csanad United Railways. In France, the Crochat petrol–electric transmission system was used for standard-gauge locomotives (up to 240 kW of electrical power).

== Description ==
Petrol–electric vehicles follow a series hybrid architecture. A spark-ignition internal-combustion (IC) engine acts as the prime mover, powering a generator which converts the rotational energy into electrical energy. The generator charges a battery pack and drives a traction motor that provides tractive effort for the vehicle to move.

A schematic representation of the power train of a series-hybrid vehicle

The engine is usually smaller than what would be required for powering a conventional petrol vehicle of the same size. Internal-combustion engines vary greatly in efficiency at various speeds and power outputs, and in this context can run more often nearer their optimal speeds and power outputs, powering the generator. When extra power is needed for acceleration or for climbing gradients, both the engine and the battery pack power the motor. When the engine produces more power than is required at the road wheels, the surplus is used to charge the battery.

Petrol–electric vehicles typically don't require any stepping up or transmission as electric traction motors can operate at a wide rpm range at peak efficiency. The Engine generator pair is a compact unit that isn't connected mechanically to the road wheels. The connection is purely electrical.

== Advantages ==
- Electric traction motors are more efficient than IC engines in stop-and-go driving, typically the case in urban and suburban routes.
- The IC engine can be made smaller than what is usually required to move a similar sized pure gas-powered vehicle. IC engines are their own air pumps and have poor efficiency at low speeds. So IC engines have to be made larger than what is required for conventional gas-powered vehicles. This is not the case for petrol-hybrid vehicles where an electric motor provides traction. Electric motors can deliver peak torque at a wide range of rpms. Small engines result in a compact design and more space.
- IC engines can operate at their peak rpm range throughout and improve mileage. IC engines operate at peak efficiency at higher rpms, In petrol–electric vehicles, the engine can keep running at these speeds as the motor is the one delivering traction. This results in lesser fuel usage and harmful emissions. This isn't the case with conventional vehicles where the engine has to slow down when the vehicle brakes.
- Petrol–electric vehicles have an idle-stop function where the engine can be shut off during idling or during long deceleration.
- Regenerative braking is possible with petrol–electric vehicles. When the brakes are applied, the traction motor can be switched to act as a generator and charge the battery pack. A magnetic resistance force acts on the wheels to slow them, while the battery is charged. Conventional brakes use frictional braking force only, which dissipate and waste rotational energy as heat. Regenerative braking saves energy, they are used in combination with friction brakes for anti lock braking (ABS).
- Petrol–electric vehicles can deliver additional power when it is demanded by the driver, like during hard acceleration or climbing a gradient. They also have automatic transmission and can deliver step-less power.

== Disadvantages ==
- Petrol–electric vehicles have many energy-conversion steps, which can result in reduced efficiency due to energy loss at each stage of the transition.
- Petrol–electric vehicles, and typically most series hybrid vehicles need two electric machines, a generator coupled to the engine and a motor–generator coupled to the wheels.
- They need larger electric traction motors.
- Having two types of motor adds weight and complexity

== Historical applications ==
=== Road ===
Examples of road vehicles using petrol–electric transmission include the Tilling-Stevens bus (UK) and the Owen Magnetic touring car (United States).

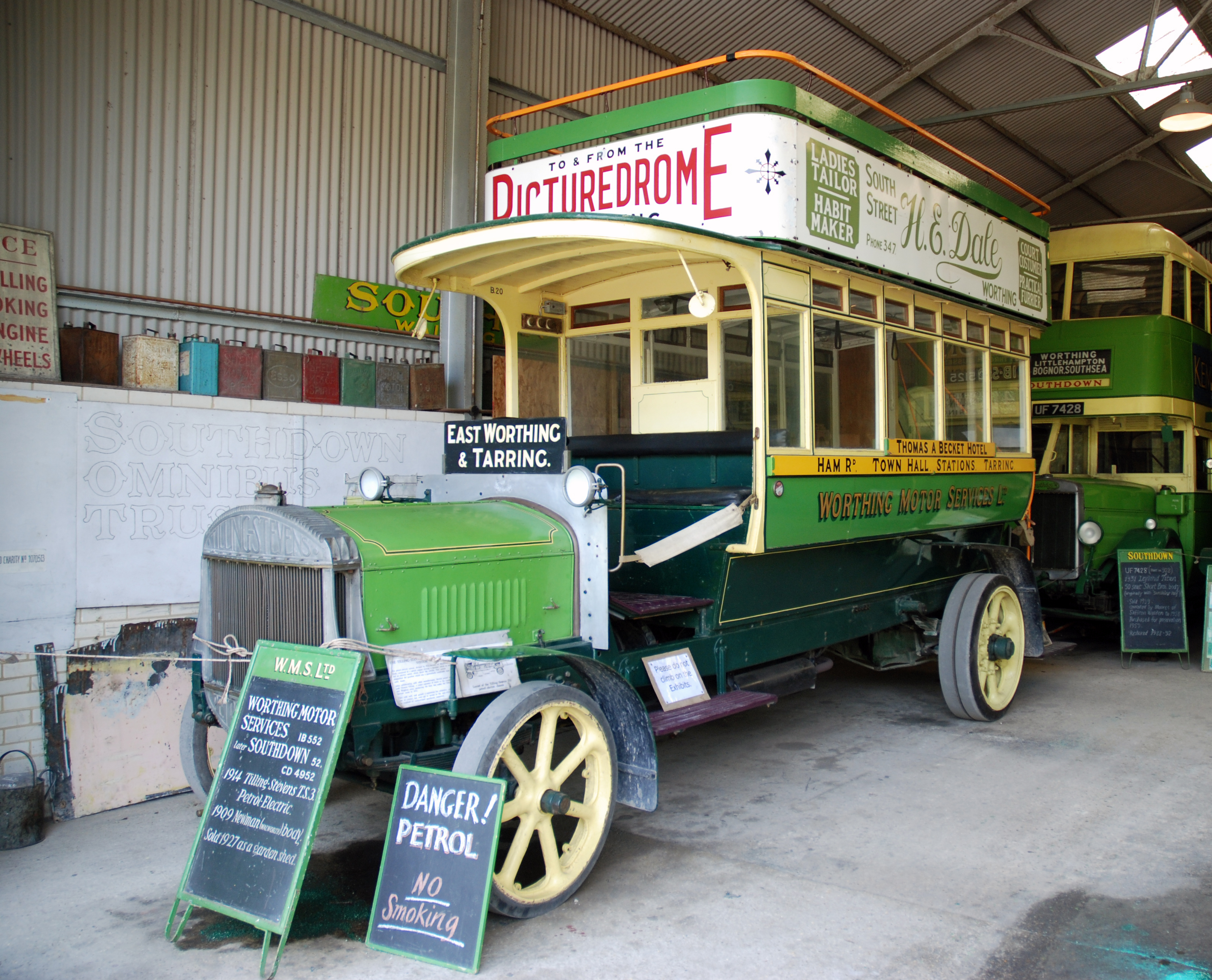
Tilling-Stevens petrol–electric bus

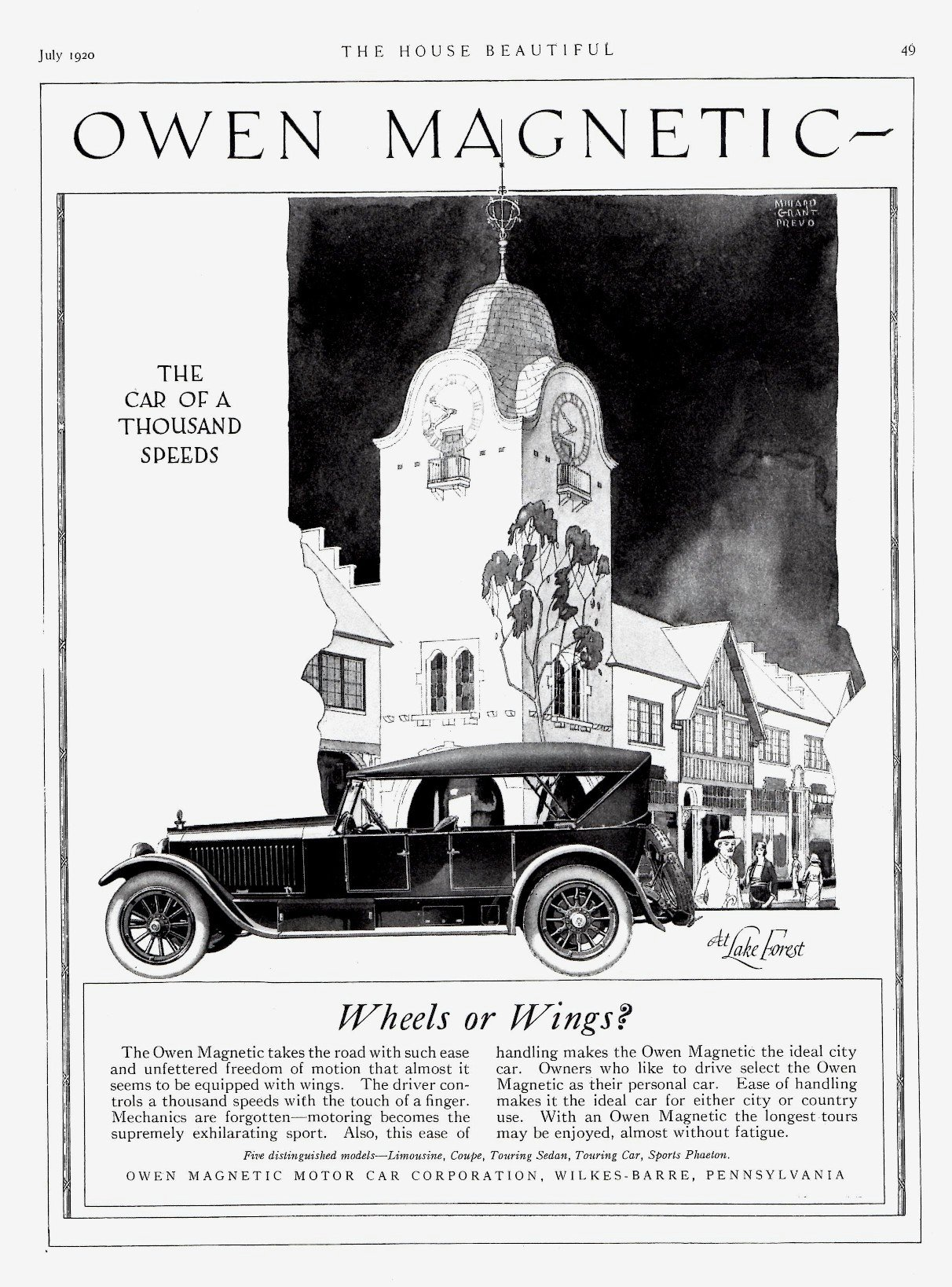
Owen Magnetic touring car 1920 advertisement

=== Rail ===
Examples of petrol–electric rail vehicles include the North Eastern Railway 1903 Petrol Electric Autocar, Doodlebug (rail car), GE 57-ton gas–electric boxcab, Weitzer railmotor and the petrol–electric locomotives built for the War Department Light Railways by Dick, Kerr & Co. and British Westinghouse. In France, the Crochat-Colardeau system of Henry Crochat and Emmanuel Colardeau was used in some petrol–electric railcars.

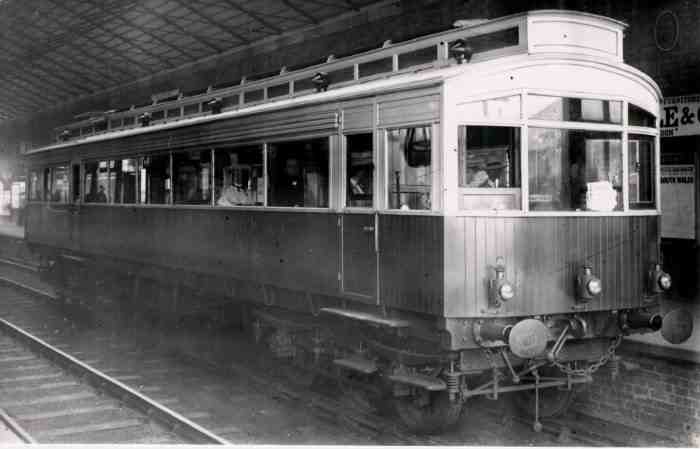
North Eastern Railway Autocar at Filey Station

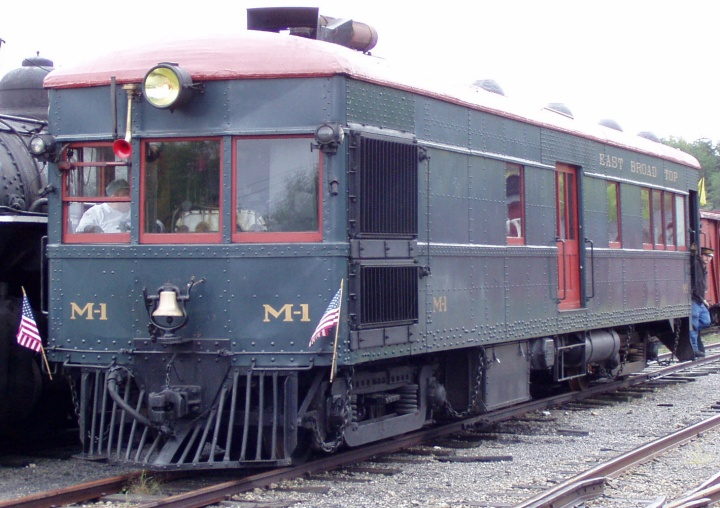
Gas–electric "Doodlebug" railcar

Dick, Kerr & Co. petrol–electric locomotive under construction

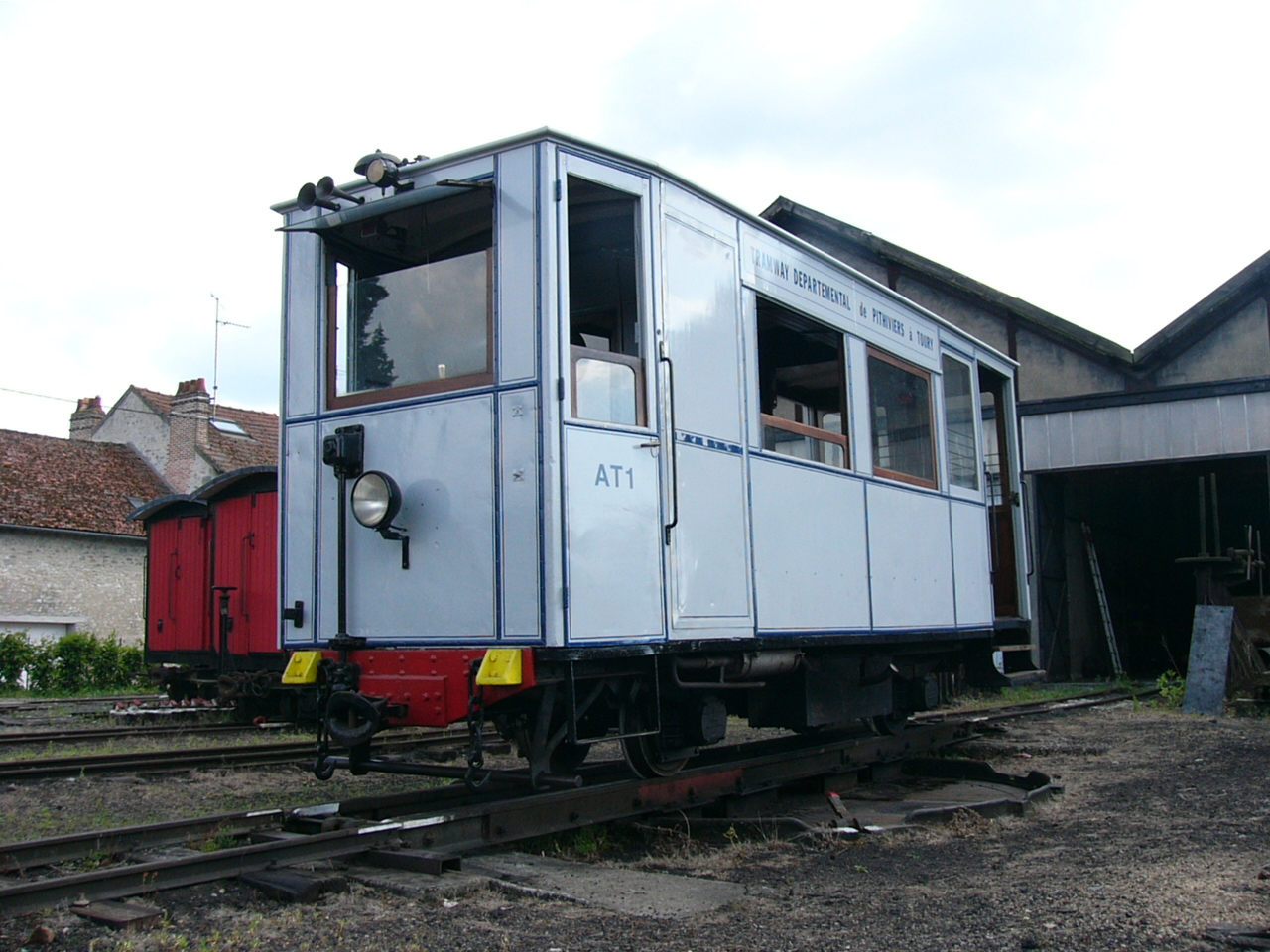
Crochat petrol–electric railcar preserved at Pithiviers

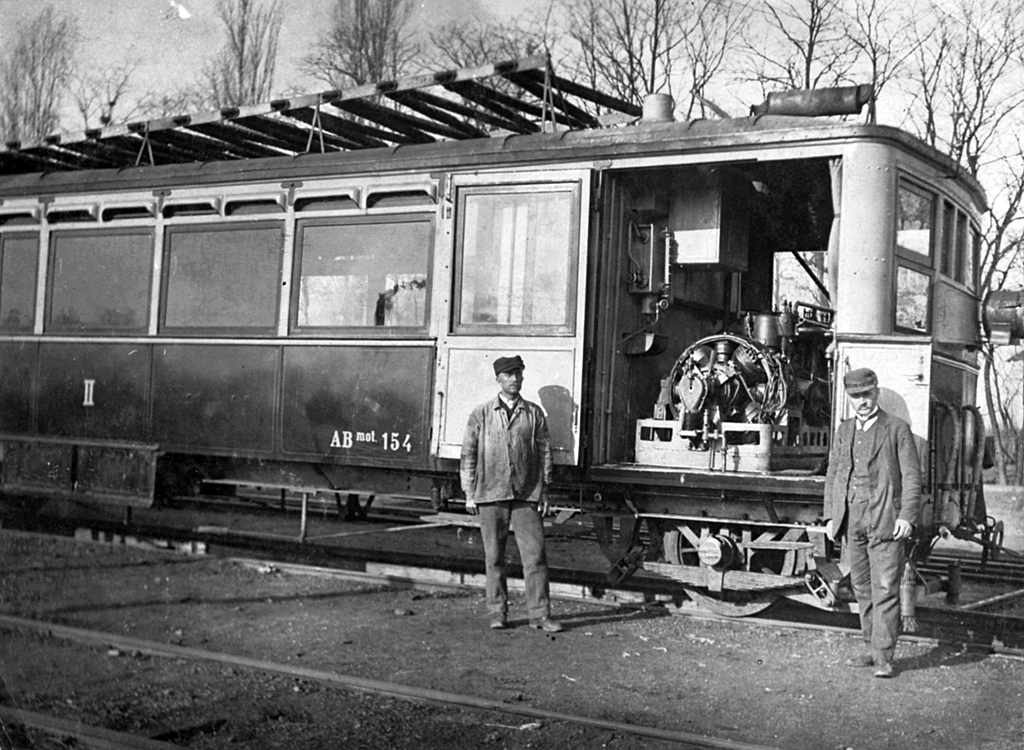
Weitzer railmotor produced for ACsEV

=== Marine ===
Most submarines that served in World War I were diesel–electric. However, some petrol–electric submarines had been built before the war. Examples include: Plunger-class submarine (USA), A-class submarine (1903) (UK), SM U-1 (Austria-Hungary), Russian submarine Krab (1912).

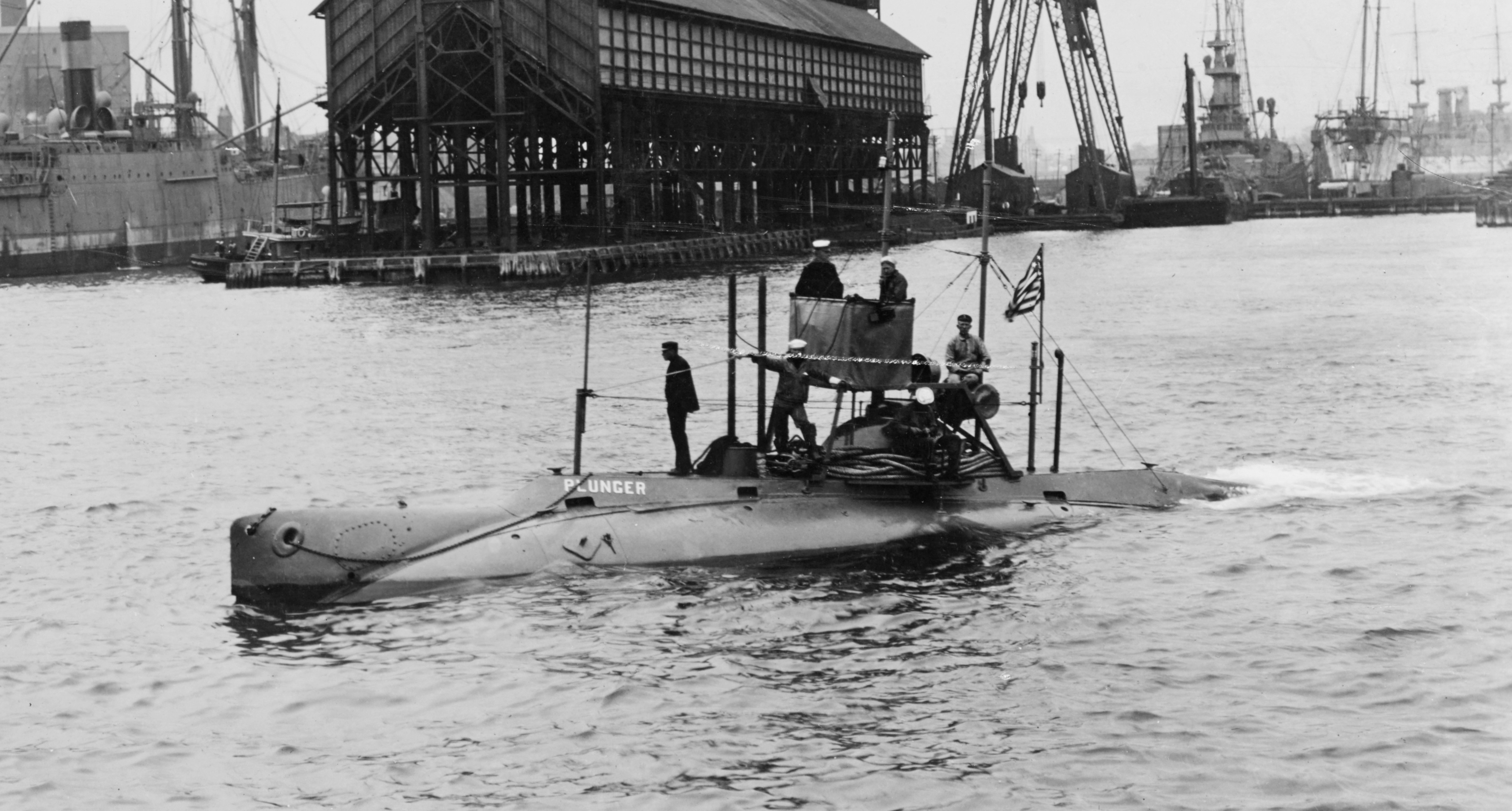
USS Plunger S2-1

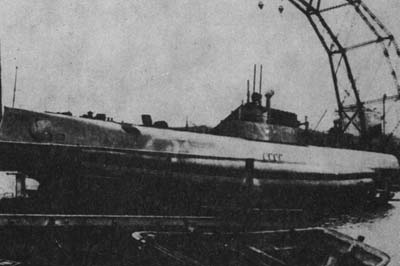
Russian submarine Krab

=== Military vehicles ===
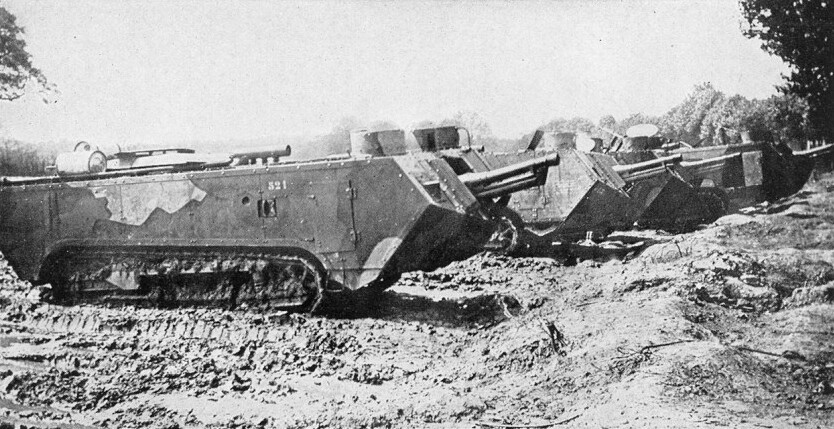
St. Chamond tank

Petrol–electric systems were tested on the British Mark II tank, American Holt gas–electric tank and French Saint Chamont in 1917. The latter used the Crochat-Colardeau system of Henry Crochat and Emmanuel Colardeau. This allowed the left and right traction motors to run at different speeds for steering and is detailed in patent US1416611. The 1936 prototype Char G1P was also designed with a petrol–electric drive.

Ferdinand Porsche was the main developer of these drive trains for military vehicles in Nazi Germany. He created the VK 3001 (P) prototype and VK 4501, of which 91 units were produced as the Porsche Tiger. They were later converted into Ferdinand, and subsequently Elefant, tank destroyers. Another noteworthy design was the 188-tonne Porsche type 205 prototypes, commonly known as the Maus super-heavy tank.

== Modern applications ==
Petrol–electric transmission is used in hybrid electric vehicles. Hybrid-electric powertrains include series, parallel, and power-split configurations, which combine an internal combustion engine with electric machines and energy storage.

== See also ==
- Diesel–electric transmission
- Turbine–electric transmission
