= Virginia and Truckee Railway Motor Car 22 =

Preserved gasoline-powered railcar

Coordinates: 39°8′54.3″N 119°46′6.05″W

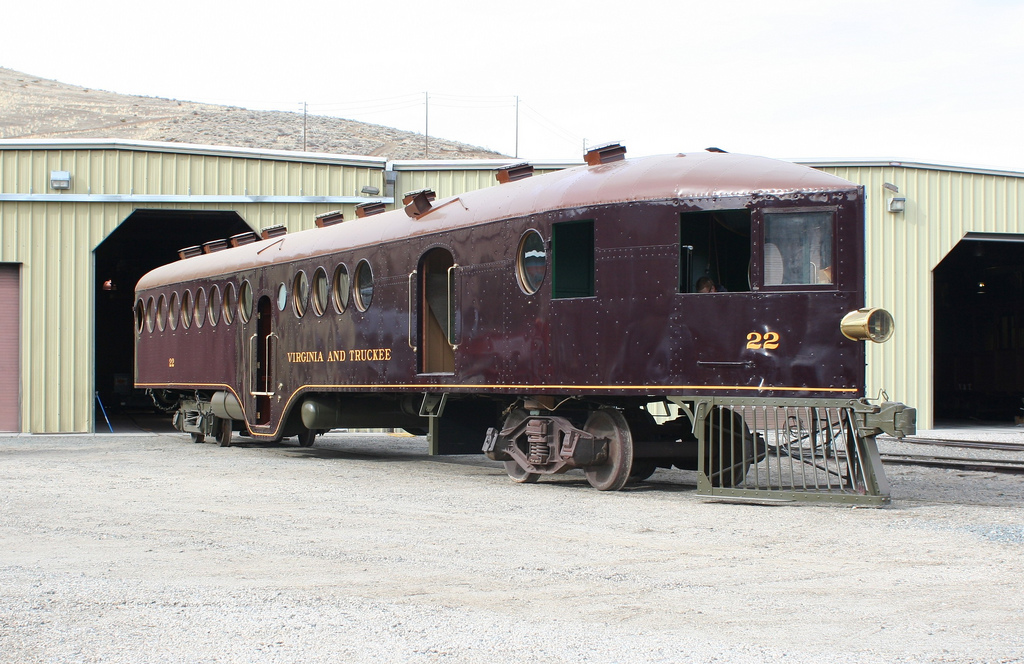
- Motor Car 22 after exterior restoration in 2009
Type and origin
- Power type: Gasoline (1910); Diesel (2010)
- Builder: McKeen Motor Car Company
- Build date: 1909–1910
Specifications
- Configuration
  - AAR: A1-2
  - UIC: (A1)2'
- Gauge: 4 ft 8 1/2 in (1,435 mm)
- Driver dia.: 42 in (1,067 mm)
- Wheel diameter: 33 in (838 mm)
- Wheelbase: 52 ft 7 in (16.03 m)
- Length: 72 ft 9 3/4 in (22.19 m)
- Width: 10 ft 2 3/4 in (3.12 m)
- Height: 11 ft 9 3/16 in (3.59 m)
- Loco weight: 68,000 lb (30,844 kg)
- Fuel capacity: 120 US gal (450 L)
- Transmission: 1910: Morse chain drive 2010: Hydraulic drive
Performance figures
- Maximum speed: 32 1/2 mph (52.3 km/h)
- Power output: 200 hp (150 kW)
Career
- Operators: Virginia and Truckee Railroad
- Delivered: May 9, 1910
- First run: June 2, 1910
- Retired: October 31, 1945
- Restored: May 9, 2010
- Current owner: Nevada State Railroad Museum
- Disposition: Operational
U.S. National Register of Historic Places
- Official name: McKeen Motor Car #70
- Designated: September 6, 2005
- Reference no.: 05000968
U.S. National Historic Landmark
- Designated: October 16, 2012

Virginia and Truckee Railway Motor Car 22, also called McKeen Motor Car 70, is a gasoline-powered railcar at the Nevada State Railroad Museum in Carson City in the U.S. state of Nevada. It was built for the Virginia and Truckee Railroad in 1910 by the McKeen Motor Car Company. Motor Car 22 was operated by the Virginia and Truckee until 1945, when it was sold off and became a diner until 1955. It eventually became the office and storage space for a plumbing business before it was donated to the Nevada State Railroad Museum in 1995. After a thorough study, the Museum undertook a restoration of the McKeen car in 1997. The restored motor car was unveiled in 2010, a century after it was originally delivered to the Virginia and Truckee. Motor Car 22 was listed on the National Register of Historic Places in 2005, and designated a National Historic Landmark in 2012. It is one of a few surviving McKeen railcars, and the only one that is operational.

== Design ==
Virginia and Truckee Railway Motor Car 22 has a total length of 72 feet 9 3/4 inches (22.19 m), a width of 10 feet 2 3/4 inches (3.12 m) and a height of 11 feet 9 3/16 inches (3.59 m). It was one of the largest railcars produced by the McKeen Motor Car Company. The car body was mounted onto a chassis on top of a pair of non-pivoting two-axle trucks; each of the unpowered axles has a set of 33-inch (838 mm) wheels. Motor Car 22 was powered by a 200-horsepower (150 kW), gasoline internal combustion engine that was modeled after a marine engine. The engine was connected to the motor car's 42 inches (1,067 mm) driving wheels via a Morse "silent" chain drive. After the restoration of Motor Car 22, the engine was replaced with a modern Caterpillar diesel engine because no original McKeen engine was available. The original chain drive was also replaced with a hydraulic drive.

The car body was constructed from steel using a monocoque design and given an aerodynamic shape. The body consisted of a curved roof, rounded rear end, and its distinctive knife-edge "wind-splitter" front end. Also a characteristic of the McKeen railcars was the frequent use of porthole windows; a total of 33 were used on Motor Car 22. The interior of Motor Car 22 was divided into the engine compartment inside the pointed front end of the motor car, the passenger compartment at the rear of the car, and the baggage compartment in the middle. When built, it had a seating capacity of 84 passengers.

== History ==
In 1906, the Virginia and Truckee Railroad opened a branch line from Carson City to Minden, Nevada. The profitability of the line led the Virginia and Truckee to start additional passenger service using self-propelled motor cars, which were less expensive to operate than a train pulled by a steam locomotive. An order was placed on October 6, 1909, with the McKeen Motor Car Company for a 70-foot (20 m) railcar costing $22,000. Motor Car 22 was delivered to the Virginia and Truckee on May 9, 1910, and entered into regular service June 6, 1910. Declining profits forced the railroad to suspend usage of the McKeen car in 1929. It was converted into a railway post office and handler for the Railway Express Agency in 1932, and placed back into service. Motor Car 22 was retired after 539,800 miles (868,700 km) and 35 years of service on October 31, 1945.

The engine and trucks were removed from the McKeen car, and the body was sold in 1946 by the Virginia and Truckee. It was used as a diner in Carson City until it was sold in 1955 to a plumbing business for use as offices and storage. The remains of Motor Car 22 were eventually donated to the Nevada State Railroad Museum in 1995.

=== Restoration ===
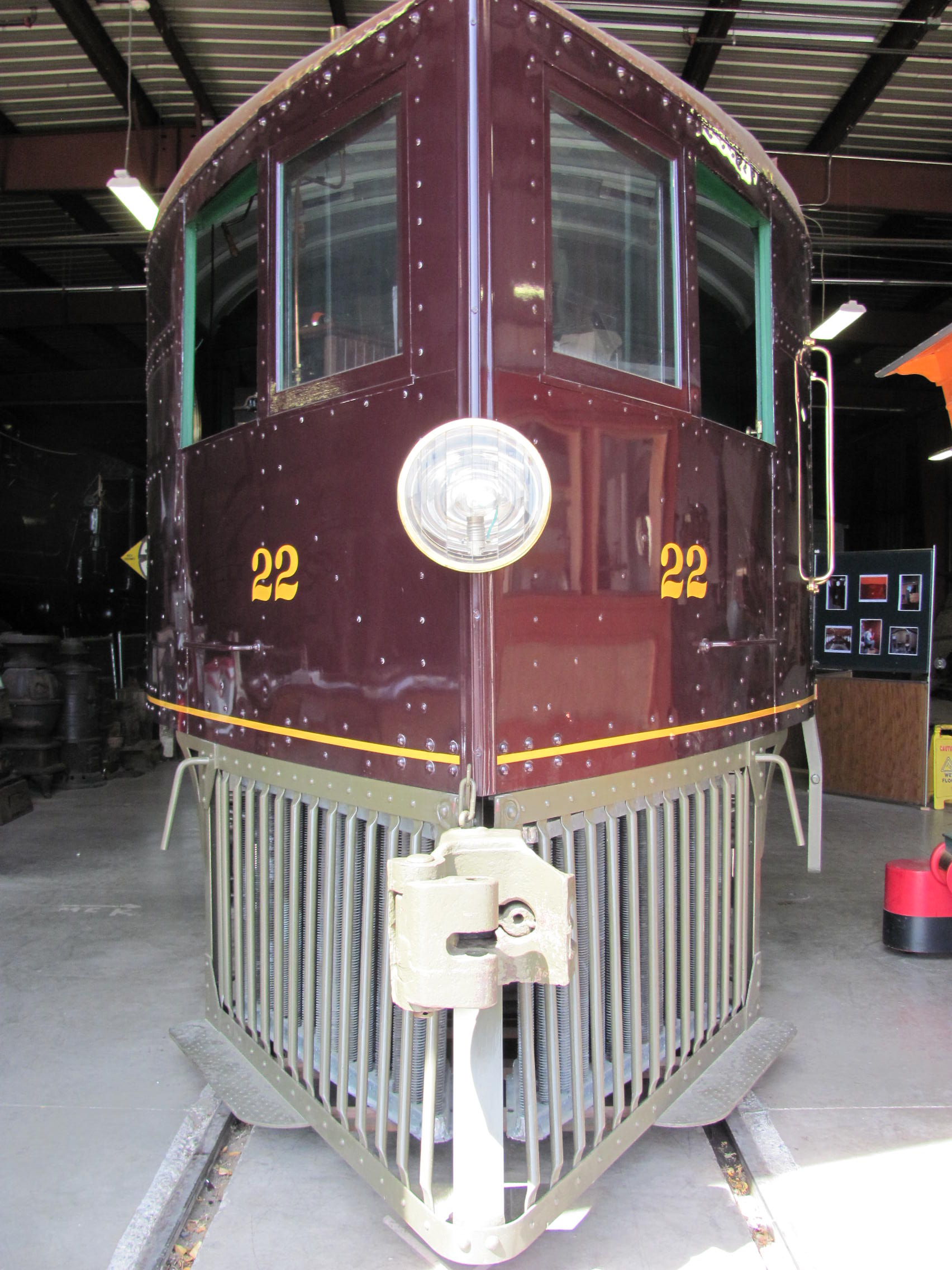
The distinctive "wind-splitter" nose of Motor Car 22

From 1995 to August 1997, the Nevada State Railroad Museum conducted a feasibility study of whether the McKeen could be restored to working order. The study found that most of the historic material needed could be salvaged or replicated, with the exception of the engine, transmission and acetylene lighting. Motor Car 22 was listed on the National Register of Historic Places on September 6, 2005. The study also determined that there are four surviving McKeen motor cars, only two of them being 70-foot (20 m) models. None of them could "display the current state of high integrity and preservation" seen in Motor Car 22: one was converted into a passenger rail car in Anchorage, Alaska, one was cut in half and used as a shed in Price, Utah, while another was converted into a diesel-electric switcher.

The motor car was rededicated after the formal completion of the restoration on the centennial of its delivery to the Virginia and Truckee—May 9, 2010. The McKeen car was designated a National Historic Landmark on October 16, 2012. The car is operated annually by the Nevada State Railroad Museum for Nevada Day, Independence Day, Father's Day and National Train Day.

== See also ==
- List of National Historic Landmarks in Nevada
- National Register of Historic Places listings in Carson City, Nevada

== Sources ==
- Barton, Peter D. (Summer 2010). "Virginia & Truckee Railway McKeen Car No. 22 Returns to Service on the Centennial of its Delivery" (PDF). Sagebrush Headlight. Vol. 31, no. 2. Nevada State Railroad Museum. Archived from the original (PDF) on May 2, 2013.
- Bedeau, Michael (August 11, 2011). "McKeen Motor Car #70" (PDF). National Historic Landmark Nomination Form. National Park Service.
- DeWitt, Cliff (Fall 2003). "McKeen Car Power Plant Selected". Sagebrush Headlight. Vol. 24, no. 2. Nevada State Railroad Museum. pp. 1, 3, 5.
- Drew, Stephen E. (Winter 2010). "Self-Propelled Passenger Cars in Nevada: Part I" (PDF). Sagebrush Headlight. Vol. 31, no. 2. Nevada State Railroad Museum. pp. 1, 4–6. Archived from the original (PDF) on May 2, 2013.
