= McKeen Motor Car Company =

Early 1900s self-propelled railcar manufacturer

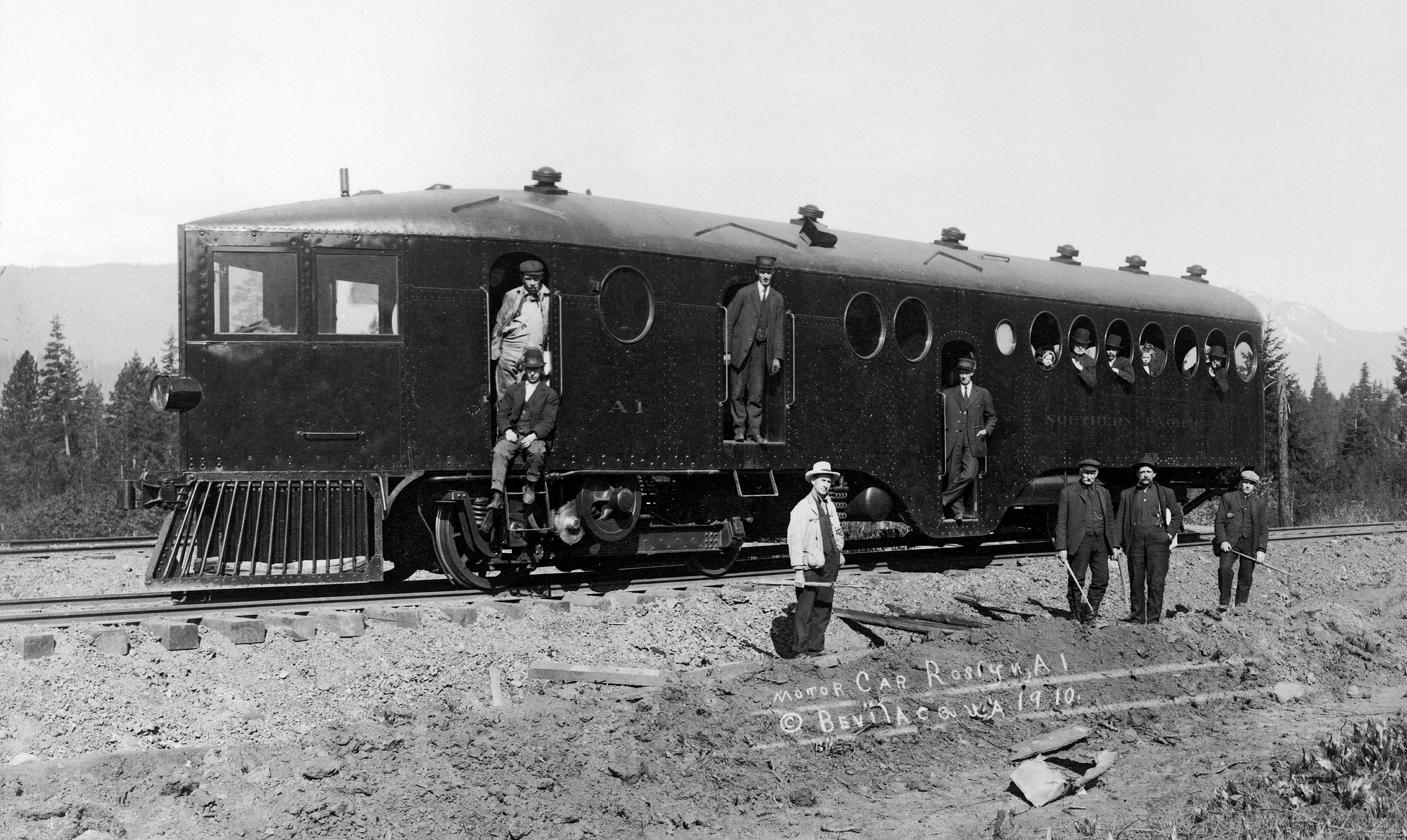
McKeen car Roslyn of the Northern Pacific Railroad.

The McKeen Motor Car Company of Omaha, Nebraska, was a builder of internal combustion-engined railroad motor cars (railcars), constructing 152 between 1905 and 1917. Founded by William McKeen, the Union Pacific Railroad's Superintendent of Motive Power and Machinery, the company was essentially an offshoot of the Union Pacific and the first cars were constructed by the UP before McKeen leased shop space in the UP's Omaha Shops in Omaha, Nebraska. The UP had asked him to develop a way of running small passenger trains more economically and McKeen produced a design that was ahead of its time. However internal combustion engine technology was not, and the McKeen cars never found a truly reliable powerplant.

The vast majority of the cars produced were for E. H. Harriman's empire of lines (Union Pacific, Southern Pacific and others). Harriman's death in 1909 lost the company its major sponsor and investor and Harriman's successors were less enthusiastic about the McKeen cars.

Many McKeen cars ended up being re-engined with a variety of drive mechanisms — gasoline-mechanical, gasoline-electric, diesel-electric or even steam power.

Most, although not all, McKeen cars had the distinctive "wind-splitter" pointed aerodynamic front end and rounded tail. The porthole windows were also a McKeen trademark, adopted allegedly for strength after the 7th production car. A dropped central door, as pictured, was also present on the majority of the cars. Two lengths, 55 and 70 feet, were offered; either could be fitted out with a large mail and express area ahead of the center doors, a smaller mail/express area, or the car could be all seats for a maximum capacity of 64 or 105 respectively.

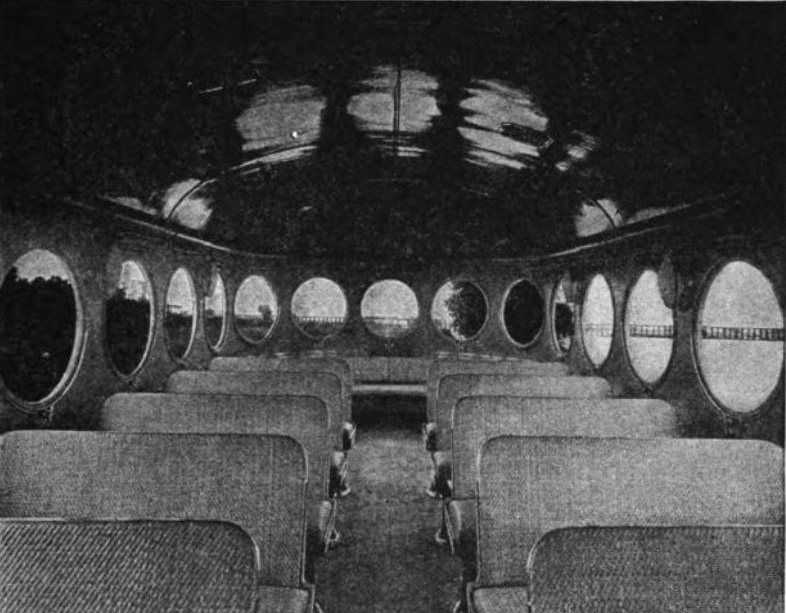
Interior of a McKeen car.

== Anatomy of a McKeen car ==
=== Carbody ===
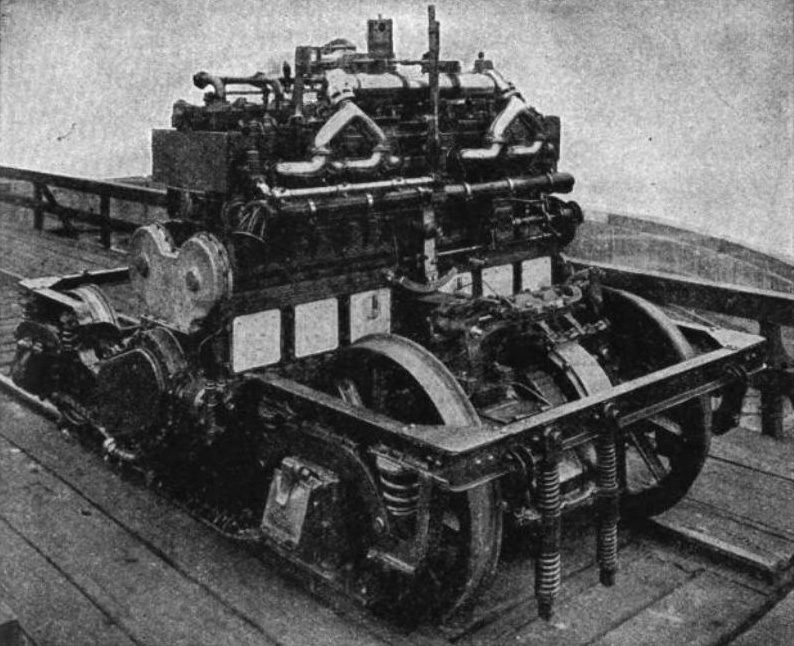
Motor truck with engine

=== Engine ===
Originally, McKeen cars used engines from the Standard Motor Works of Jersey City, New Jersey, but switched to an engine of their own design from the eighth car produced, M8 on the Union Pacific. All engines were straight-6 in configuration, of power ratings between 100 horsepower (75 kW) on the first car (M1) and a maximum of 300 horsepower (220 kW) on the most powerful later cars. The cylinders were vertical and the engine mounted transversely across the car in all McKeen cars and locomotives produced. The majority of McKeen motors were distillate fueled.

All engines were equipped to be run in either direction, as is not uncommon with marine engines; there was no reverse gear. To run in reverse, the engine had to be stopped, the camshaft shifted by the motorman to the reverse cam set and the engine restarted in reverse. A flywheel located on the left side of the lead truck spun in the direction the engine was operating, whether or not the car was in motion. The flywheel aided in the engine momentum and operated the electric generator for lighting.

Starting was by compressed air.

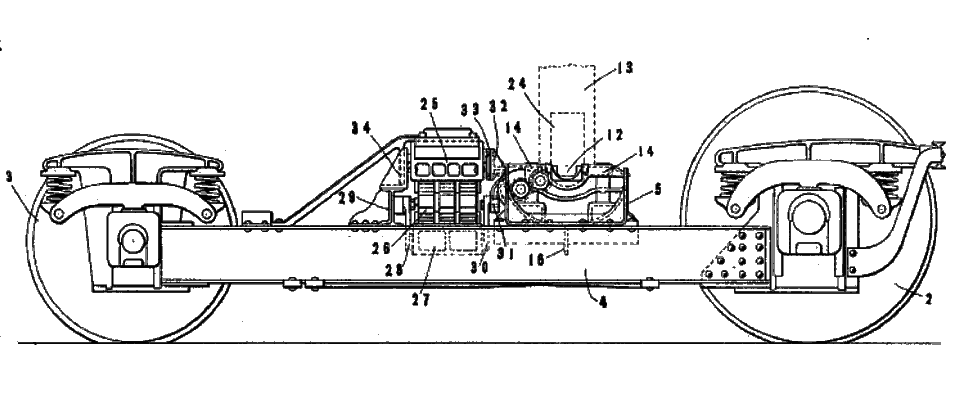
Side elevation of motor truck; larger wheel on right is the front.

=== Trucks ===
The lead truck of the car was the powered truck; the engine was rigidly mounted above it. Only the front axle was powered (via a chain drive), which contributed to the car's poor adhesion. The front wheels were 42 in (1.1 m) in diameter, while the remainder were 33 in (0.84 m). None of the two trucks pivoted.

=== Interior ===
McKeen cars were generally wood-panelled on the interior and fitted with transverse bench seats with a central aisle. The rounded rear was fitted with a semi-circular bench seat. Lighting was originally acetylene.

== Problems with McKeen cars ==
Most of the problems experienced with McKeen cars involved the powerplant and drivetrain. As with many other attempts to bring marine engine technology to the rails, engines that were reliable on the stable platform of a ship when attended to by experienced technicians and operators proved less so when exposed to the vibration, indifferent maintenance and less careful handling they found on the railroad.

Starting the engine was a problem on the early cars; with no independently powered compressor, the compressed-air starting relied on the limited reserves of the car's reservoirs. There were many reports of cars being started by being pushed or towed by locomotives or even horses, after the compressed air ran out. Later cars, with an independent gasoline-driven compressor which could be hand-started, did not suffer from these problems.

The lack of a reverse gear also caused problems. The engine had to be stopped, the camshaft shifted to a set of reverse cams and then started in the opposite direction. This was acceptable shipboard, perhaps, but deeply disliked by railroad operators. Accounts exist of engineers' elaborate schemes for avoiding the necessity to reverse.

The transmission was a common problem; a clutch did not seem to exist which combined the ability to withstand 200 horsepower (150 kW) on a regular basis with the ability to give a smooth start. Clutch failures were commonplace. Competitor GE's cars used an electric transmission and that or a hydraulic torque converter have been used on the vast majority of successful internal combustion-engined rail vehicles since.

Many operators found the McKeen car to be lacking in power and traction, the latter unsurprising since only one of four axles was powered.

Since the trucks did not pivot, the cars were bad at turning on curves.

== Unusual McKeen products ==
The vast majority of McKeen products followed the pattern set out above, but some unusual ones were also rolled out.

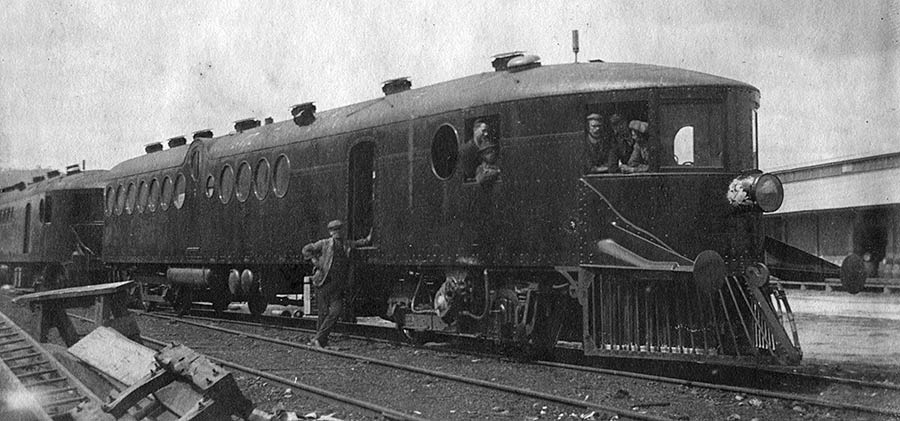
McKeen car of the Victorian Railways at Wodonga, c.1912.

=== Victorian Railways cars ===
The Victorian Railways, the government-run system of the state of Victoria in Australia, ordered two McKeen cars in 1911, these being delivered in 1912. These were the only broad-gauge cars, built to the VR gauge of 5 ft 3 in (1,600 mm). They were fitted with buffers and hook and chain couplers, and were built with the rounded-nose body type, rather than knife-nosed. Since VR stations uniformly had car-level platforms, the usual dropped entranceway was instead raised into the roof.

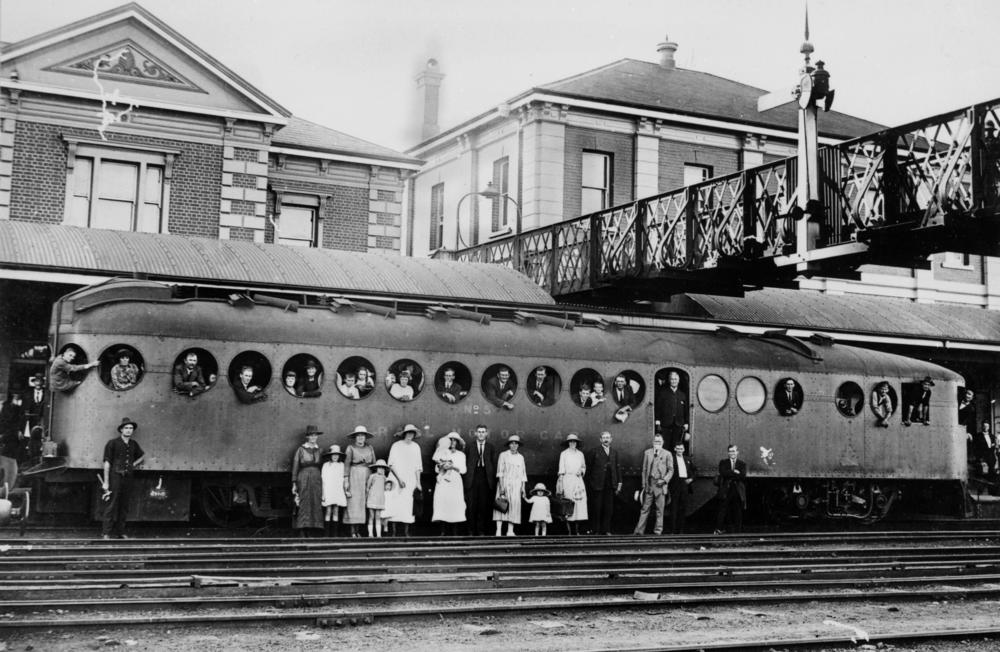
McKeen car of the Queensland Railways.

=== Queensland Railways cars ===
In 1911, the Queensland Railways of the state of Queensland, Australia, ordered five McKeen cars which were delivered in May 1913. These were to the QR gauge of 3 ft 6 in (1,067 mm), and were the only narrow gauge McKeen cars. They were issued running numbers 1 through 5.

Like the Victorian Railways cars, the cars were fitted with the more rounded nose and with buffers; however, the typical McKeen dropped center door was retained to permit easy passenger access without a raised platform. The cars, unlike most, had the same size of wheels on both axles of the lead truck and a chain drive linking them, making all 4 wheels driven.

These cars were approximately 19 metres (62 ft 4 in) long and originally seated 75; this was soon reduced to 69 by dividing the car into a non-smoking section (seating 55) and a smoking section (seating 14). The five cars were based at Woolloongabba for most of their lives, and handled services to the Brisbane suburbs of Corinda and Sunnybank as well as between Manly and Cleveland.

The cars proved no more reliable in Queensland than elsewhere; by 1920 car No.1 was out of service and cars Nos. 2 and 5 were modified as Tourist and Day Inspection cars, with luxury accommodations for 32 passengers. They were still expensive to run, at an estimated double the running costs of a steam-hauled train; the Great Depression finished them off, and the five cars were withdrawn between 1929 and 1931 and scrapped at QR's Ipswich shops.

=== Southern Utah Railroad #100 ===
The Southern Utah Railroad took possession in 1916 of the most powerful McKeen motor car ever produced, with a six-wheel leading truck. Two of the three axles in that truck were powered, connected by side rods; the engine developed 300 horsepower (220 kW). Unlike most McKeen cars, it had a rounded front end instead of the knife-edge prow normally favored; it also featured roof-mounted radiators in addition to those in the normal location behind the pilot.

Despite the extra power, this was only a 55-foot-0-inch (16.76 m) car with a capacity of 48 passengers. The additional power was needed for the severe grades (max. 4.92%) and curvature of the line between Price and Hiawatha for which it was intended.

The car was apparently not a success and did not last long in service, being withdrawn from service in June 1917 and dismantled, the engine and power truck being sold. The carbody was used as a shop employee locker room for Utah Railway (successor to Southern Utah Railroad) at Martin until it was dismantled in 1990. In the mid '90s the dismantled #100 was then purchased by a Utah Railway employee who also had a farm near Helper. To move the car, he cut it in half at the vestibule and used the rail car as two separate storage units. In 2015, the two halves were then traded for two sea containers by Bently enterprises LLC. It was then moved to Minden, Nevada and is undergoing restoration.

=== Locomotives ===
The company produced at least one gasoline-engined locomotive. A locomotive was produced in about 1913 and worked around the company shops in Omaha; A locomotive (probably the same one) was tested in the UP's Aspen Tunnel. A locomotive, numbered 5 but possibly again the same one, was documented in the contemporary trade press, photos of which are below.

It is described as being of B-1 wheel arrangement, with the engine mounted across the car as normal and driving the rearmost driving axle in the normal McKeen fashion. Siderods transferred the drive to the other pair of driven wheels. The arrangement was largely identical to the three-axle lead truck on the unique Southern Utah Railway McKeen car.

Zeitler documents this locomotive as having a tractive effort of 12,000 lbf (53 kN). The frame was cast steel, and the superstructure constructed of steel, with sufficient solidity to add structural strength; the horizontal cast steel engine bed was also described as a structural member. The straight-6 engine had an 11-inch (279 mm) bore and 15-inch (381 mm) stroke, for a total displacement of 8,553 cubic inches (140.16 L); it developed 300 horsepower (220 kW).

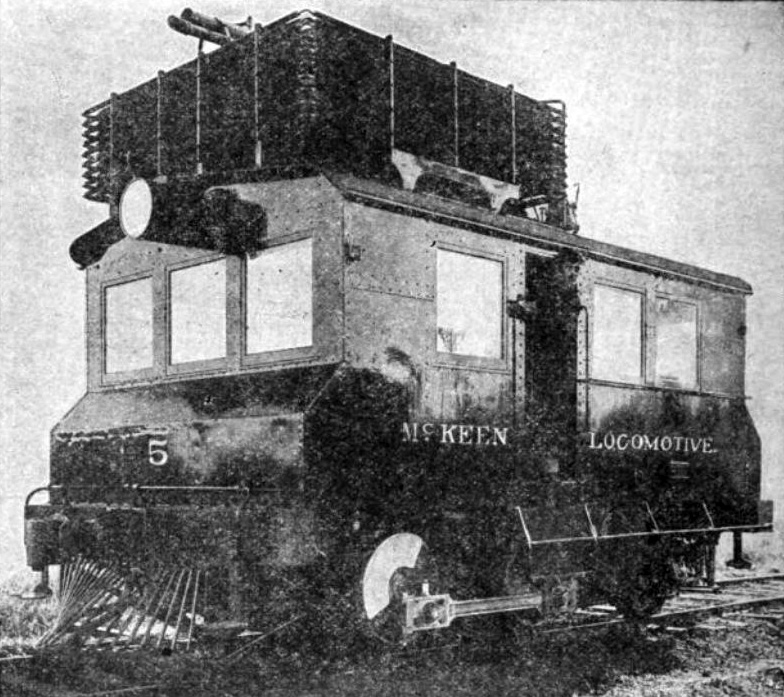
Locomotive, lettered for "McKeen Locomotive" and numbered "5".

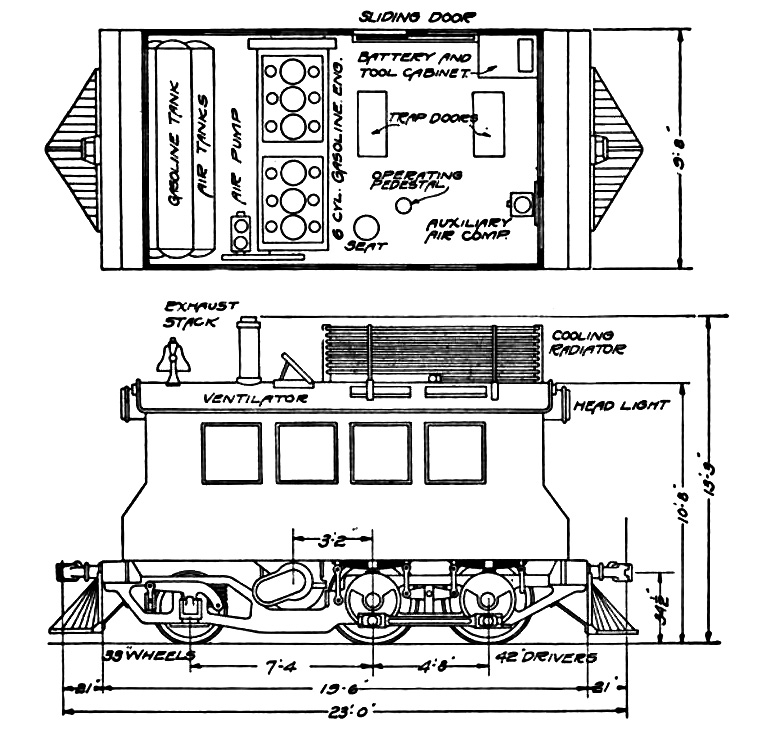
General arrangement drawing

Schopp documents that a locomotive was sold to the Motley County Railroad in 1915, and speculates that this may also have been the same single locomotive. In the same article, he recounts a locomotive reported as being stored at the Omaha shops in 1917 that may have been the same locomotive once more.

Another McKeen locomotive was created by the Charles City Western Railway of Iowa by building a wooden boxcab superstructure atop a McKeen power truck.

== Surviving McKeen products ==
The Nevada State Railroad Museum has restored a full McKeen car, Virginia and Truckee Railway Motor Car 22, a 1910-built 70 foot car. This was one of the last McKeen cars to be still running with its original motor. It made its last run in September 1945 and its body was sold in 1946 for service as a roadside diner, later to be used for a plumbing supply store in Carson City, Nevada. Donated to the Museum in 1996, its first run was on May 9, 2010, the car's hundredth anniversary of construction. The original powerplant did not survive and no other McKeen engines could be located. Consequently, a modern diesel engine was fitted to allow the car to operate up to the original maximum speed. The fully restored McKeen motorcar was put back into operation on May 9, 2010, right on schedule for its 100th anniversary of its construction. The motorcar is now being used at the Nevada State Railroad Museum In Carson City Nevada for special occasions such as Independence Day and Nevada Day

The NSRM also owns the remains of a second McKeen car which was converted into a diesel-electric switching locomotive.

Another McKeen body, construction number 83/103, survives in Ramona, California. It originally belonged to the San Diego Cuyamaca & Eastern Railroad then was later sold to the Yuma Valley Railroad before arriving in Alaska around 1921, being re-engined and round-nosed in 1924, converted to an unpowered trailer in 1935 and finally retired in the late 1940s after serving in the 714th Railway Battalion during WWII. The car, originally named the "Cuyamaca", is now undergoing restoration by Madison Kirkman of the McKeen Motor Car Company Historical Society.

Two unpowered McKeen trailers survive; Union Pacific T8 is preserved at the Illinois Railway Museum. Southern Pacific T-16 is stored at the McKeen Motor Car Company Historical Society after formerly being used as a storage shed in St. Helena, California.

== Owning railroads ==
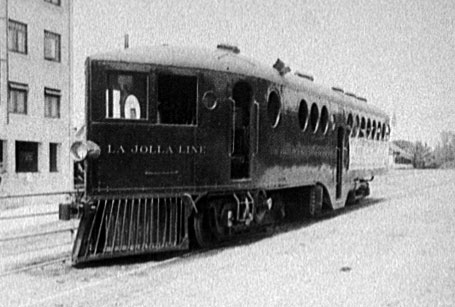
McKeen car of the Los Angeles and San Diego Beach Railway, the "La Jolla Line".

=== U.S. customers ===
- Ann Arbor Railroad – 5 cars
- Arizona Eastern Railroad – 2 cars; to Southern Pacific
- Atchison, Topeka and Santa Fe Railway – 4 cars
- Bellingham Bay and British Columbia Railroad – 1 car; to Bellingham Northern; to Milwaukee Road
- Bessemer and Lake Erie Railroad – 1 car
- Buffalo, Rochester and Pittsburgh Railway – 1 car
- Central New York Southern Railroad – 2 cars
- Charles City Western Railway – 1 car
- Chicago and North Western Railway – 1 car
- Chicago Great Western Railway – 4 cars
- Chicago, Rock Island and Pacific Railroad – 5 cars
- Denver, Laramie & Northwestern Railroad – 2 cars, Greeley & Denver to Great Western RR
- Erie Railroad – 3 cars
- Galveston, Harrisburg and San Antonio Railway – 2 cars; to Texas and New Orleans Railroad
- Hocking-Sunday Creek Traction Company – 1 car
- Houston and Texas Central Railroad – 1 car
- Illinois Central Railroad – 1 car
- Lakeside and Marblehead Railroad – 1 x 55-ft car, #5, built 1916)
- Maryland and Pennsylvania Railroad 1 car as a trial, returned to manufacturer
- Maricopa and Phoenix Railroad – 2 cars; to Arizona Eastern; to Southern Pacific
- Morgan's Lake Railroad – 2 cars; to Texas and New Orleans Railroad
- Minneapolis, Anoka and Cuyuna Range Railroad – 2 cars; to Union Pacific
- Minneapolis & Northern Railway – 2 cars to Minneapolis, Anoka and Cuyuna Range Railroad to Union Pacific
- Norfolk Southern Railroad – 1 car
- North Coast Railroad – 2 cars; to Oregon-Washington Railway and Navigation
- Northern Pacific Railway – 1 car
- Oregon and California Rail Road – 2 cars; to Southern Pacific
- Oregon-Washington Railroad and Navigation Company – 3 cars
- Oregon Railroad and Navigation Company – 3 cars; to Oregon-Washington Railroad and Navigation Company
- Oregon Short Line Railroad – 6 cars; 3 to Union Pacific Railroad
- Pennsylvania Railroad – 1 car
- People's Electric Railroad, Muskogee, Oklahoma – 2 cars
- Riviera Beach Railway received a McKeen Car from Sand Springs Railway
- Salem, Falls City and Western Railway – 1 car
- San Diego, Pacific Beach and La Jolla Railway (later Los Angeles and San Diego Beach Railway)
- Sand Springs Railway – 2 cars
- Silver Peak Railroad
- Southern Pacific Company – 31 cars
- Tonopah and Goldfield Railroad
- Union Pacific Railroad – 20 cars
- Virginia and Truckee Railroad – 1 car
- Woodstock and Sycamore Traction Company – 3 cars

=== Export customers ===
- Ferrocarril Norte de Cuba – 1 car
- Ferrocarril del Sonora, Mexico – 1 car
- Queensland Railways, Australia – 5 x 3 ft 6 in (1,067 mm) gauge cars (the only narrow-gauge McKeen cars)
- Victorian Railways, Australia – 2 x 5 ft 3 in (1,600 mm) gauge cars

== See also ==
- Railcar
- Diesel multiple unit
- Doodlebug, a common term for self-propelled railcars in the USA
