= X16 =

X16 may refer to:

- X16 (New York City bus)
- Bell X-16, an American reconnaissance jet
- Matsunaga Station, in Hiroshima Prefecture, Japan
- SJ X16, a Swedish electric railcar
- Commander X16, a retrocomputing project
- X-16 engine, a sixteen-cylinder X engine
