= Autorail =

French passenger railcar class

The French word Autorail describes a single powered railcar capable of carrying passengers. While the concept faded for a while, it has been introduced with a new range of vehicles for both standard and metre gauge lines.

Many autorails from the 1950s and 1960s form the basic transport of many French preserved railways, of Chemin de Fer Touristique (sometimes Historique). They can be used at times of year when steam locomotives might cause fires. They have quick availability and do not require the specialized infrastructure needs of steam locomotives. Many lines have both steam and diesel traction, but steam is often reserved for peak periods and weekends. The power of these machines allows them to pull a small number of trailers if passenger loads necessitate.

== X4200 Panoramique ==
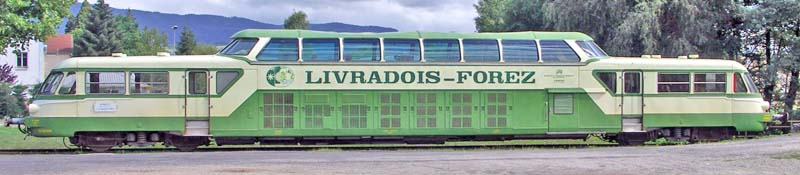
The Panoramique at Ambert in the Auvergne region of France. It runs on the Agrivap tourist line.

One of the more sophisticated Autorails built was the Panoramique from Renault. The raised centre section was attractive to tourists in scenic areas.

=== Specification ===
- Passengers: 88
- Freight: 1,500 kg (3,300 lb)
- Engine: 1 MGO V122 SH
- Power: 600 kW (800 hp; 820 PS) (820 PS = 820 cv)
- Transmission: Electric
- Mass: 55,450 kg (122,250 lb)
- Overall Length: 27.770 m (91 ft 1.3 in)
- Max Speed: 36 m/s (120 ft/s) (130 km/h or 81 mph)

== Other Renault autorail models ==
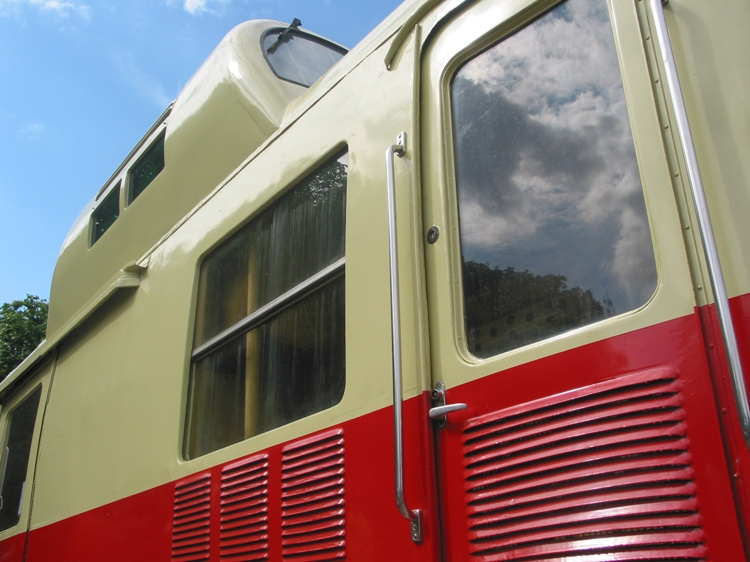
Renault Picasso driver's cab

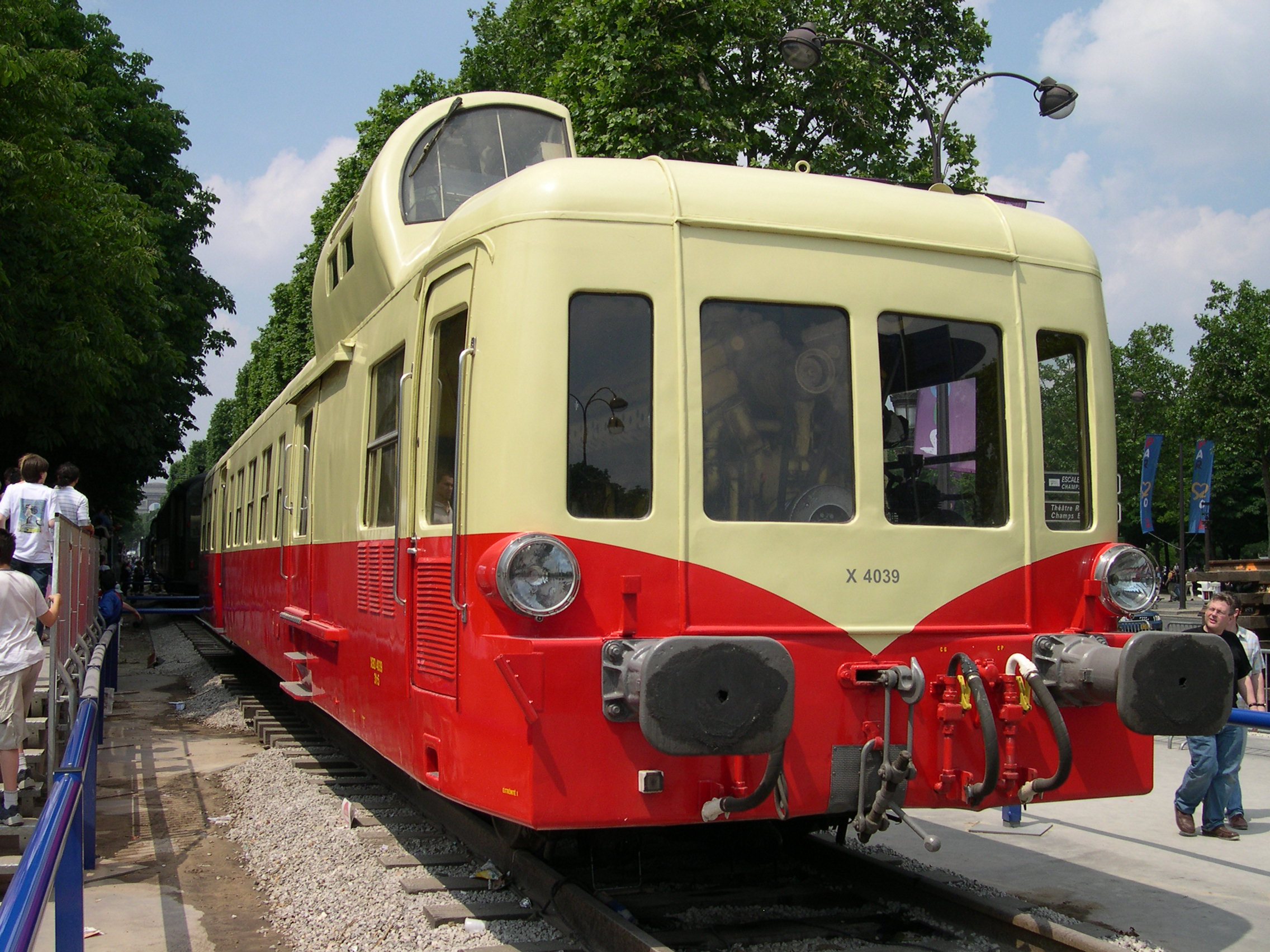
Renault Picasso

- Renault ABH1, from 1935
- Renault ABH5, from 1942
- Renault ABH8, from the 1940s
- Renault X 2800 from 1957
- Renault X 3800 Picasso, from 1955 and features a distinctive drivers cab
- Renault X 5500 from 1950
- Renault X 5800 from 1953

== See also ==
- Autorail Bugatti
- Budd Rail Diesel Car
- Budd SPV-2000
- Micheline (railcar)
- Railbus
- Railcar
- Railmotor
- Motor coach (rail)
