= SJ X16 =

Series of electric railcars

X16/X17
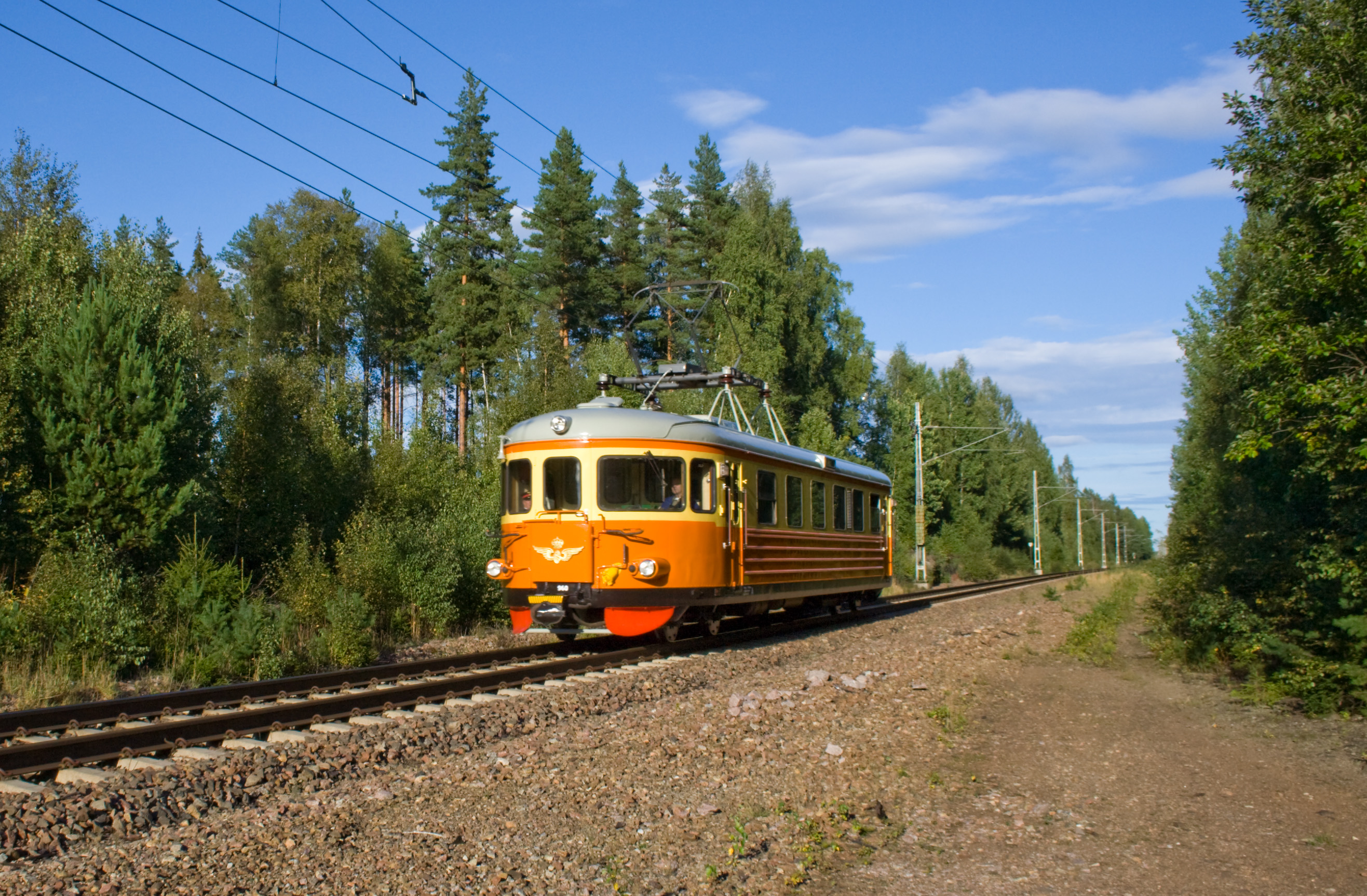
- In service: 1955 - 1980s
- Manufacturers: Svenska Järnvägsverkstäderna; ASEA
- Constructed: 1955-1956
- Number built: 18 (X16); 12 (X17)
- Fleet numbers: 958-975 (X16); 976-987 (X17)
- Capacity: 55 (X16); 49 (X17)
- Operator: Statens Järnvägar

Specifications
- Car length: 17,550 mm (57 ft 6.9 in)
- Maximum speed: 110 km/h (68 mph)
- Weight: 21 tonnes (20.7 long tons; 23.1 short tons)
- Power output: 170 kW (230 hp)
- Electric system: 15 kV 16.7 Hz AC catenary
- Current collection: Pantograph
- Track gauge: 1,435 mm (4 ft 8 1/2 in)

X16 and X17 were a series of electric railcars operated by Statens Järnvägar (SJ) of Sweden. They were built by Svenska Järnvägsverkstäderna and ASEA in 1955-1956 and delivered as 30 units. They are the electrical counterpart of Y6 and Y7 railcars. The units were mostly in service in Svealand, and later around Gävle and in Värmland in the 1980s. The X17 differed in having four-a-breast seating, instead of five.
